= Trevor Banks =

English motorcycle racer

Trevor Charles Banks
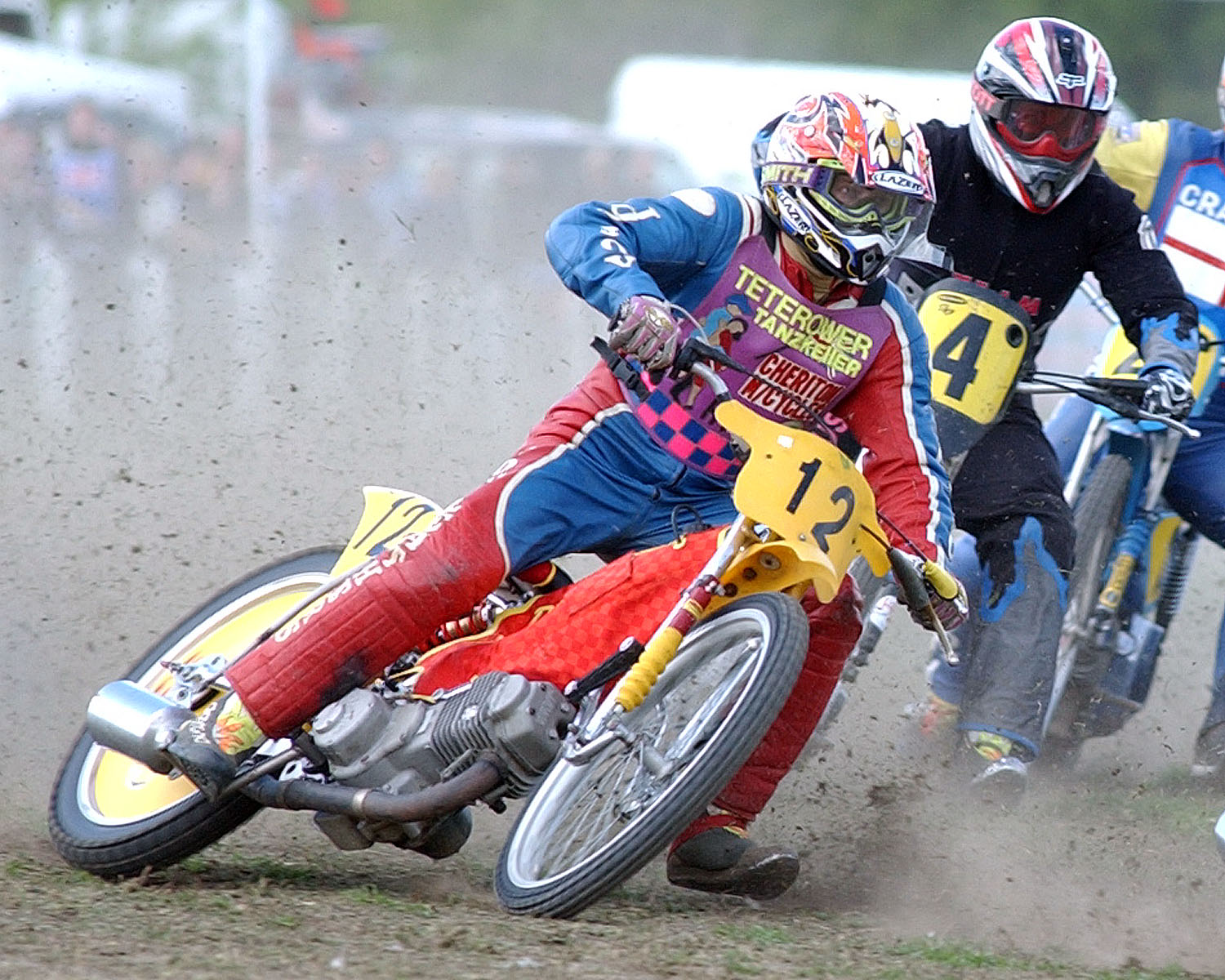
- Banks competing in grasstrack during 2003
- Born: 4 October 1955 (age 71); Folkestone, England
- Nationality: British (English)

Career history
- 1982–1983: Crayford Kestrels
- 1984–1985, 1987: Hackney Kestrels
- 1984: Wolverhampton Wolves
- 1986–1990: Milton Keynes Knights
- 2005: Sittingbourne Crusaders

Team honours
- 1984: National League KO Cup Winner

Trevor Charles Banks (born 4 October 1955) is a former motorcycle racer from England, who competed in grasstrack and longtrack.

== Career ==
Banks was an established grasstrack and longtrack rider by the time that he started his British speedway leagues career for Crayford Kestrels during the 1982 National League season. He would then go on to ride for Hackney Kestrels and Milton Keynes Knights.

After the 1990 speedway season, Banks concentrated on grasstrack and would not return to speedway until 2005, when he rode for the Sittingbourne Crusaders.

Banks was twice the 500cc British grasstrack champion in 1979 and 1980.

== Family ==
Banks is the son of Monty Banks who was a notable Grasstrack competitor in the South East of England. His brother Graham rode for Canterbury Crusaders but was killed in a grasstrack event in 1978.

== World Longtrack Championship ==
- 1981 - Semi-final
- 1982 - Semi-final
- 1983 - Semi-final
- 1984 - Semi-final
- 1985 - Qualifying Round
- 1986 - (Germany) Pfarrkirchen (17th) 3pts
- 1987 - (Germany) Mühldorf (13th) 5pts
- 1988 - Qualifying Round
- 1989 - Qualifying Round

== European Grasstrack Championship ==
=== Finals ===
- 1978 (England) Hereford (5th) 19pts
- 1980 (Germany) Bad Waldsee (4th) 18pts
- 1990 (Netherlands) Uithuizen (6th) 13pts
- 1991 (Germany) Werlte (Third) 17pts
- 1992 (Belgium) Alken (7th) 13pts
- 1998 (Germany) Schwarme (5th) 15pts
- 2000 (France) St. Colomb de Lauzun (10th) 9pts
- 2002 (Germany) Berghaupten (13th) 6pts
- 2003 (France) La Reole (17) 5pts

== British Grasstrack Championship ==
=== Masters Finals ===
- 1982 (England) Exeter (Top Ten)
- 1983 (England) Evesham (Top Ten)
- 1984 (England) Yarm (Second)
- 1985 (England) Abingdon (Third)
- 1986 (England) Exeter (Third)
- 1987 (England) Andover (Second)
- 1988 (England) Abingdon (Second)
- 1989 (England) Andover (Top Ten)
- 1990 (England) Chetton Finalist
- 1991 (England) Tonbridge (Top Ten)
- 1992 (England) Abingdon (Top Ten)
- 1993 (England) Wimborne (Second)
- 1994 (England) Tonbridge (Top Ten)
- 1995 (England) Monkhopton Finalist
- 1996 (England) Dalton Barracks Finalist
- 1997 (England) Andover (Third)
- 1999 (England) Dalton Barracks (Top Ten)
- 2000 (England) Folkestone (Top Ten)
- 2001 (England) Dalton Barracks (Top Ten)
- 2002 (England) Thorpe St Peter Finalist
- 2003 (England) Folkestone Finalist

=== 500cc Finals ===
- 1979 (England) Braintree (Champion)
- 1980 (England) Clyst St. Mary (Champion)
- 1981 (England) Uckington (Second)

=== 350cc Finals ===
- 1973 (England) Bocking (Third)
- 1975 (England) Spilsby (Second)
