= 1992 Individual Long Track World Championship =

Long track motorcycle racing event

The 1992 Individual Long Track World Championship was the 22nd edition of the FIM speedway Individual Long Track World Championship. The event was held on 13 September 1992 in Pfarrkirchen, Germany.

The world title was won by Marcel Gerhard of Switzerland.

== Final Classification ==
Pos	Rider	Heat Pts	Heat Pts	Heat Pts	Heat Pts	Heat Pts	Total Pts
1	(Switzerland) Marcel Gerhard	5	3	5	5	5	23
2	(New Zealand) Mitch Shirra	4	4	5	4	4	21
3	(Germany) Karl Maier	5	5	4	4	2	20
4	(Germany) Gerd Riss	5	5	2	5	1	18
5	(England) Mark Loram	4	4	4	3	3	18
6	(Czechoslovakia) Aleš Dryml Sr.	2	5	3	3	0	13
7	(Sweden) Henrik Gustafsson	3	3	3	2	E	11
8	(Germany) Klaus Lausch	3	1	5	1	E	10
9	(Germany) Uwe Gessner	4	4	1	ef	E	9
10	(Sweden) Stefan Dannö	1	2	4	2	E	9
11	(Germany) Egon Müller	2	2	2	ef	E	6
12	(England) Andy Smith	2	3	0	f	E	5
13	(Czechoslovakia) Borivoj Hadek	3	2	0	E	E	5
14	(England) Marvyn Cox	1	1	3	E	E	5
15	(England) Steve Schofield	0	1	1	E	E	2
16	(Germany) Bernd Diener	0	0	2	E	E	2
17	(Australia) Shane Parker	0	0	1	E	E	1
18	(Argentina) Luis Vallejos	1	-	-	E	E	1
19	(England) Simon Wigg	x	0	ef	E	E	0

- E = eliminated (no further ride)
- f = fell
- ef = engine failure
- x = excluded
