= Egon Müller =

Motorcycle speedway rider from Germany

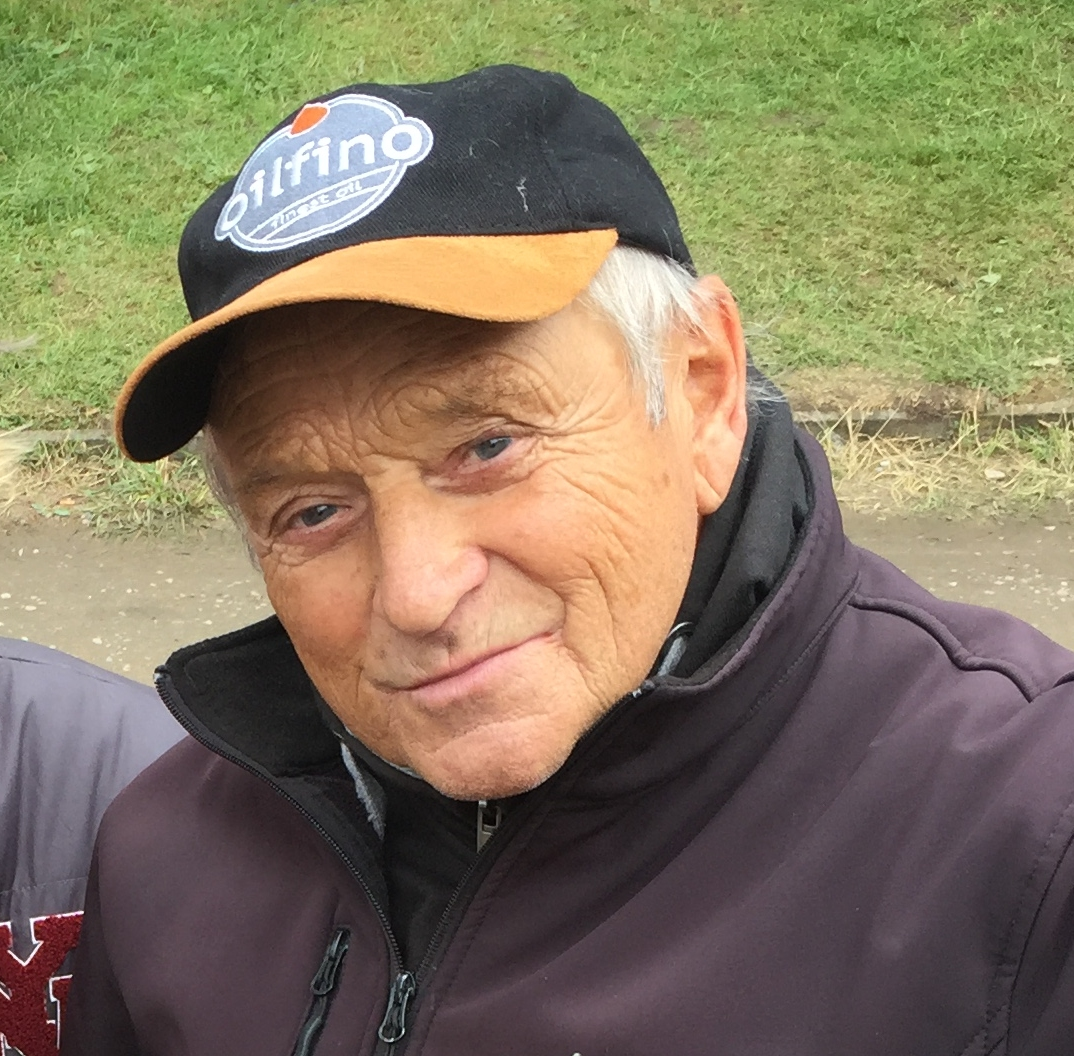
- Egon Müller in 2018
- Born: 26 November 1948 (age 77); Kiel, Germany
- Nationality: German

Career history

Germany
- 1973–1976: Neumünster
- 1977–1983: Brokstedt
- 1984–1987: Diedenbergen

Great Britain
- 1973: Coatbridge Tigers
- 1976: Hull Vikings

Individual honours
- 1983: World Champion
- 1974, 1975, 1978: Long Track World Champion
- 1975, 1977, 1979, 1981, 1983, 1984, 1985: German Champion
- 1976, 1981, 1984, 1985: Continental Champion
- 1973, 1975, 1977, 1982, 1984, 1985: West German Longtrack Champion
- 1978: German Longtrack Golden Helmet Champion
- 1976, 1979.: German Longtrack Silver Helmet Champion

Egon Müller (born 26 November 1948) is a German former motorcycle speedway rider. He won the Speedway World Championship in 1983, winning the title in his homeland with a maximum score of 15 points. He earned 44 international caps for the West German national speedway team.

== Early life ==
Müller was born on 26 November 1948 in Kiel, Germany.

== Career ==
=== Motorcycle speedway ===
Müller won the German Champion seven times (1975, 1977, 1979, 1981, 1983, 1984 and 1985). He rode briefly in the United Kingdom in 1973 for the Coatbridge Tigers (Scotland), and in 1976 for the Hull Vikings. Despite him only appearing for a handful of meetings in 1976, Hull were granted a 'Egon Muller (Rider Replacement)' facility for the entire 1977 season.

Müller won the Long Track World Championship in 1974, 1975 and 1978. He finished second in 1980 and 1984, and finished third in 1976 and 1982. He also represented West Germany in the Speedway World Pairs Championship, finishing a best of 3rd in 1977 at Hyde Road in Manchester, England paired with Hans Wassermann. Müller also competed in the Speedway World Team Cup where he led the West Germans to a third-place finish in both 1981 at the Olching Speedwaybahn in Olching, and again in 1982 at the White City Stadium in London, England. He was also a four-time winner of the Continental Final which was the last World Final qualifying round for European-based riders. Müller won the Continental Final in 1976, 1981, 1984 and 1985.

As of the 2025 Speedway Grand Prix series, Müller is the only German rider to have won the Speedway World Championship when he took out the title with a 15-point maximum at the Motodrom Halbemond in Norden in 1983 from Australian Billy Sanders and 1980 champion Michael Lee. At a time when the Speedway World Championship Final was a single meeting that could throw up a surprise winner on the day, Müller was generally seen as a 'one hit wonder' in the same way that Poland's 1973 World Champion Jerzy Szczakiel was. However, Müller was a perennial championship contender having made four previous World Final appearances (1976, 1977, 1980 and 1981) as well as being a triple Long track World Champion, and an eight time German Champion.

Following the 1983 World Final, rumours surfaced that West German officials had given Müller extra practice time on the 400 metres (440 yards) Norden track that the other riders were not given. Other rumours also surfaced that many of the riders believed that the track had been prepared more like a long track in order to give Müller an advantage, with the track actually receiving a grade by the tractor after each race. In commentary for British television, 1976 World Champion Peter Collins noted that the Motodrom that day was more like a Grass track than a regular speedway which definitely suited the West German.

Just two weeks after his 1983 World Championship win, Müller was reportedly involved in a motor accident on the Autobahn where he wrote off his Porsche. The accident saw him spend a couple of days in hospital with minor leg injuries. Just one week following this, he competed in the 1983 World Long Track final in Czechoslovakia. Müller went on to ride in the 1984 and 1985 World Finals but could not replicate his 1983 win, finishing in 14th place with just three points from his five rides on each occasion.

In 1987, while crossing the road in Amsterdam, Müller was hit by a car and broke his kneecap. This affected his career and he concentrated on longtrack afterwards.

=== Music/actor ===
Outside of his sport career, Muller was a pop singer under the stage name Amadeus Liszt (with some hits like "La Donna" in 1986, "Win The Race" in 1987 and "The Devil Wins" in 1989), a moderator at trade fairs, shows and charity events, an actor and a television personality.

== World Final appearances ==
=== Individual World Championship ===
- 1976 - (Poland) Chorzów, Silesian Stadium - 8th - 8pts
- 1977 - (Sweden) Gothenburg, Ullevi - 7th - 8pts
- 1980 - (Sweden) Gothenburg, Ullevi - 14th - 4pts
- 1981 - (England) London, Wembley Stadium - 7th - 9pts
- 1983 - (West Germany) Norden, Motodrom Halbemond - Winner - 15pts
- 1984 - (Sweden) Gothenburg, Ullevi - 14th - 3pts
- 1985 - (England) Bradford, Odsal Stadium - 12th - 5pts

=== World Pairs Championship ===
- 1977 - (England) Manchester, Hyde Road (with Hans Wassermann) - 3rd - 18pts (11)
- 1981 - (Poland) Chorzów, Silesian Stadium (with Georg Gilgenreiner) - 7th - 3pts (2)
- 1983 - (Sweden) Gothenburg, Ullevi (with Karl Maier) - 6th - 12pts (6)

=== World Team Cup ===
- 1981 - (West Germany) Olching, Olching Speedwaybahn (with Karl Maier / Georg Hack / Georg Gilgenreiner) - 3rd - 28pts (10)
- 1982 - (England) London, White City Stadium (with Georg Hack / Karl Maier / Alois Wiesböck / Georg Gilgenreiner) - 3rd - 18pts (5)

== World Longtrack Championship ==
- 1973 – (Norway) Oslo (9th) 10pts
- 1974 – (West Germany) Scheeßel (Champion) 30pts
- 1975 – (Socialist Federal Republic of Yugoslavia) Gornja Radgona (Champion) 27pts
- 1976 – (Czechoslovakia) Mariánské Lázně (Third) 21pts
- 1977 – (Denmark) Aalborg (18th) 0pts
- 1978 – (West Germany) Mühldorf (Champion) 26pts
- 1979 – (Czechoslovakia) Mariánské Lázně (7th) 12pts
- 1980 – (West Germany) Scheeßel (Second) 18pts
- 1981 – (Socialist Federal Republic of Yugoslavia) Gornja Radgona (5th) 16pts
- 1982 – (Denmark) Esbjerg (Third) 21pts
- 1983 – (Czechoslovakia) Mariánské Lázně (8th) 11pts
- 1984 – (West Germany) Herxheim (Second) 19 pts
- 1985 – (Denmark) Esbjerg (5th) 17pts
- 1986 Semi-final
- 1987 – (West Germany) Mühldorf (5th) 15pts
- 1988 – (West Germany) Scheeßel (9th) 15pts
- 1989 – (Czechoslovakia) Mariánské Lázně (5th) 22pts
- 1990 Semi-final
- 1991 Semi-final
- 1992 – (Germany) Pfarrkirchen (11th) 6pts
- 1993 – (Germany) Mühldorf (7th) 11
- 1994 – (Czech Republic) Mariánské Lázně (4th) 17pts
- 1995 Semi-final
- 1996 – (Germany) Herxheim (13th) 5pts

Grand-Prix

- 1997 5 app (6th) 66pts

Best Grand-Prix Results

- (Germany) Cloppenburg – Third 1997
- (Germany) Pfarrkirchen – Second 1997

== West German Longtrack Champion ==
1973, 1975, 1977, 1982, 1984, 1985.
