= 1996 Individual Long Track World Championship =

Long track motorcycle racing event

The 1996 Individual Long Track World Championship was the 26th edition of the FIM speedway Individual Long Track World Championship. The event was held on 8 September 1996 in Herxheim in Germany.

The world title was won by Gerd Riss of Germany for the second time. It was the last individual championship with the final being held as a one off meeting. As from 1997 it would be contested under a Grand Prix system (a series of races).

== Final Classification ==
Pos	Rider	Heat Pts	Heat Pts	Heat Pts	Heat Pts	Heat Pts	Total Pts
1	(Germany) Gerd Riss	5	5	5	5	5	25
2	(Germany) Bernd Diener	5	4	5	5	4	23
3	(Germany) Robert Barth	4	4	4	4	2	18
4	(Switzerland) Marcel Gerhard	4	3	5	4	1	17
5	(England) Kelvin Tatum	5	5	ef	3	3	16
6	(Germany) Karl Maier	4	n.f	4	3	0	11
7	(England) Simon Wigg	3	4	2	2	E	11
8	(England) Steve Schofield	0	5	1	2	E	8
9	(Australia) Jason Crump	1	3	3	1	E	8
10	(Australia) Shane Parker	1	1	4	1	E	7
11	(France) Philippe Bergé	3	0	3	0	E	6
12	(Czechoslovakia) Václav Milík Sr.	2	2	2	0	E	6
13	(Germany) Egon Muller	3	1	1	E	E	5
14	(Czechoslovakia) Bohumil Brhel	2	2	1	E	E	5
15	(Czechoslovakia) Aleš Dryml Sr.	ef	1	3	E	E	4
16	(Netherlands) Anne van der Helm	2	0	2	E	E	4
17	(Norway) Lars Gunnestad	ef	3	0	E	E	3
18	(England) Paul Hurry	1	2	0	E	E	3

- E = eliminated (no further ride)
- ef = engine failure
