= Gerd Riss =

German speedway rider

- Born: 17 March 1965 (age 61); Bad Wurzach, West Germany
- Nationality: German

Career history

Germany
- 1983–1984: Krumbach
- 1987: Pocking
- 1988–1992: Landshut
- 1995–2004: Diedenbergen

Great Britain
- 1984: Poole Pirates
- 1985: Wolverhampton Wolves
- 1988: Ipswich Witches

Poland
- 1999: Bydgoszcz

Individual honours
- 1991, 1996, 1999, 2001, 2004, 2007, 2008, 2009: Long Track World champion
- 1987, 1990: Continental champion
- 1986: West German champion
- 1992, 1994, 1996: German champion
- 1988: West German Longtrack champion
- 1991, 1995, 1996, 1997, 1998, 2002, 2004, 2007, 2009: German Longtrack champion

Team honours
- 2007, 2008, 2009: Team Long Track World Championship
- 1998, 2001: German Championship

Gerd Riss (born 17 March 1965) is a German former speedway rider. He competed in motorcycle speedway and longtrack racing. He is an eight-time World longtrack champion. He also earned 22 international caps for the West German national speedway team and 12 international caps for the German national speedway team.

== Career ==
Riss reached his first world longtrack final in 1984, finishing a creditable sixth behind Erik Gundersen, at the Sandbahn Rennen Herxheim in Herxheim bei Landau/Pfalz, Germany. He rode for MC Krumbach in 1983 and 1984 and started for the first time in the British leagues when he joined Poole Pirates for the 1984 British League season. Riss joined Wolverhampton Wolves in 1985 but left mid-way through the season.

Riss consistently reached the World longtrack final every year from 1984 until 1997 and in 1987 also appeared in the 1987 Individual Speedway World Championship final at the Olympic Stadium in Amsterdam.

Riss represented his country in four consecutive Speedway World Pairs Championship finals from 1988 until 1991 and was a member of German national team at the 2001 Speedway World Cup.

Riss cemented his place as being arguably the second best longtrack rider in the world behind Simon Wigg by winning the crown in 1991 and 1996. When the world championships of both the conventional oval and longtrack switched to a Grand Prix series, riders found it virtually impossible to compete in both. Riss decided to concentrate on longtrack and the decision paid dividends because he dominated longtrack speedway, winning six more world titles in 1999, 2001, 2004, 2007, 2008 and 2009, to set a record of eight championship wins. Only Robert Barth prevented him from claiming more during the period.

In 2014, Riss was named an FIM Legend for his motorcycling achievements.

== Results ==
=== World final appearances ===
==== Individual World Championship/Grand Prix ====
- 1987 - (Netherlands) Amsterdam, Olympic Stadium - 10th - 12pts
- 1989 - (Germany) Munich, Olympic Stadium - 9th - 5pts
- 1991 - (Sweden) Gothenburg, Ullevi - 16th - 1pt
- 1993 - (Germany) Pocking, Rottalstadion - 11th - 6pts
- 1995 - series - 17th - 16pts
- 1996 - series - 19th - 12pts
- 1998 - series - 25th - 6pts

==== World Pairs Championship ====
- 1988 - (England) Bradford, Odsal Stadium (with Tommy Dunker) - 8th - 21pts (17)
- 1989 - (Poland) Leszno, Alfred Smoczyk Stadium (with Karl Maier) - 4th - 36pts (14)
- 1990 - (West Germany) Landshut, Ellermühle Stadium (with Klaus Lausch) - 9th - 15pts (0)
- 1991 - (Poland) Poznań, Olimpia Poznań Stadium (with Klaus Lausch - 4th - 18pts (9)

==== World Under-21 Championship ====
- 1985 - (Germany) Abensberg, Abensberg Motorstadion - 5th - 9pts
- 1986 - (Soviet Union) Rivne, Rivne Speedway Stadium - 13th - 4pts

==== World Longtrack Championship ====
- 1984 (West Germany) Herxheim bei Landau/Pfalz (6th) 13pts
- 1985 (Denmark) Esbjerg (8th) 15pts
- 1986 (West Germany) Pfarrkirchen (4th) 17pts
- 1987 (West Germany) Mühldorf (9th) 9pts
- 1988 (West Germany) Scheeßel (5th) 26pts
- 1989 (Czechoslovakia) Mariánské Lázně (11th) 12pts
- 1990 (Germany) Herxheim bei Landau/Pfalz (14th) 9pts
- 1991 (Czech Republic) Mariánské Lázně (Champion) 24pts
- 1992 (Germany) Pfarrkirchen (4th) 18pts
- 1993 (Germany) Mühldorf (16th) 5pts
- 1994 (Czech Republic) Mariánské Lázně (Third) 17pts
- 1995 (Germany) Scheeßel (Did not ride)
- 1996 (Germany) Herxheim bei Landau/Pfalz (Champion) 25pts
- 1998 4 app (4th) 59pts
- 1999 5 app (Champion) 115pts
- 2000 1 app (18th) 17pts
- 2001 4 app (Champion) 95pts
- 2002 5 app (Third) 89pts
- 2003 6 app (Third) 98pts
- 2004 5 app (Champion) 103pts
- 2005 4 app (Second) 75pts
- 2006 3 app (Third) 50pts
- 2007 3 app (Champion) 53pts
- 2008 4 app (Champion) 79pts
- 2009 5 app (Champion) 126pts
- 2010 3 app (13th) 53pts

==== Best Grand-Prix results ====
- (Germany) Berghaupten First 1999
- (Germany) Bielefeld First 2004, Second 2002, Third 2003
- (England) Collier Street First 2001, Third 2003
- (Netherlands) Eenrum Second 1999
- (Germany) Harsewinkel Third 2000
- (Germany) Herxheim bei Landau/Pfalz First 2001, 2009
- (Germany) Jübek First 1999
- (Czech Republic) Mariánské Lázně First 2009, Second 2008
- (France) Marmande First 2009, Second 1999, 2007, Third 2006
- (France) Morizès First 2008, Second 2001, 2004
- (Germany) Mühldorf First 1998, 1999, 2005, Third 2003
- (New Zealand) New Plymouth First 2004, Second 2003
- (Germany) Parchim First 2001, 2002, 2005
- (Germany) Pfarrkirchen Second 2004, 2007
- (Germany) Scheeßel Second 1998
- (France) Saint-Macaire Second 2010, Third 2008
- (Germany) Vechta First 2009

=== Other results ===
West Germany Longtrack Championship

- 1985 (Germany) Pfarrkirchen (6th)
- 1986 (Germany) Jübek (4th)
- 1987 (Germany) Herxheim bei Landau/Pfalz (5th)
- 1988 (Germany) Pfarrkirchen (Champion)
- 1989 (Germany) Harsewinkel (4th)

German Championship

- 1991 (Germany) Mühldorf (Champion)
- 1992 (Germany) Scheeßel (Third)
- 1993 (Germany) Jübek (Second)
- 1994 (Germany) Vilshofen (Second)
- 1995 (Germany) Pfarrkirchen (Champion)
- 1996 (Germany) Scheeßel (Champion)
- 1997 (Germany) Lüdinghausen (Champion)
- 1998 (Germany) Pfarrkirchen (Champion)
- 1999 (Germany) Herxheim bei Landau/Pfalz (Second)
- 2001 (Germany) Berghaupten (Second)
- 2002 (Germany) Harsewinkel (Champion)
- 2003 (Germany) Lüdinghausen (Second)
- 2004 (Germany) Mühldorf (Champion)
- 2006 (Germany) Berghaupten (4th)
- 2007 (Germany) Mulmshorn (Champion)
- 2008 (Germany) Pfarrkirchen (Second)
- 2009 (Germany) Mühldorf (Champion)

Grasstrack European Championship

- 2003 (France) La Réole (Champion) 21pts
- 2004 (Netherlands) Eenrum (Second) 16ps
- 2005 (Germany) Schwarme (15th) 5pts

== Family ==
Both of his sons Erik Riss and Mark Riss ride at the highest level.
