= 1993 Individual Long Track World Championship =

Long track motorcycle racing event

The 1993 Individual Long Track World Championship was the 23rd edition of the FIM speedway Individual Long Track World Championship. The event was held on 26 September 1993 in Mühldorf, Germany.

The world title was won by Simon Wigg of England for the fourth time.

== Final Classification ==
Pos	Rider	Heat Pts	Heat Pts	Heat Pts	Heat Pts	Heat Pts	Total Pts
1	(England) Simon Wigg	4	4	5	4	5	22
2	(Germany) Karl Maier	4	5	5	5	1	20
3	(Switzerland) Marcel Gerhard	5	4	4	1	2	16
4	(Hungary) Antal Kocso	3	5	1	3	4	16
5	(England) Steve Schofield	5	3	2	1	3	14
6	(Czech Republic) Aleš Dryml Sr.	5	3	0	5	ef	13
7	(Germany) Egon Müller	4	0	3	4	E	11
8	(New Zealand) Mitch Shirra	3	1	4	2	E	10
9	(Sweden) Henrik Gustafsson	3	1	5	ef	E	9
10	(Sweden) Stefan Dannö	2	1	3	3	E	9
11	(England) Joe Screen	1	3	3	2	E	9
12	(New Zealand) Tony Briggs	1	4	1	0	E	6
13	(Germany) Bernd Diener	0	2	4	E	E	6
14	(England) Mark Loram	2	2	1	E	E	5
15	(England) Paul Fry	1	2	2	E	E	5
16	(Germany) Gerd Riss	ef	5	ef	E	E	5
17	(Sweden) Erik Stenlund	2	0	ef	E	E	2
18	(France) Philippe Bergé	0	0	2	E	E	2

- E = eliminated (no further ride)
- f = fell
- ef = engine failure
- x = excluded
