= 1990 Individual Long Track World Championship =

Long track motorcycle racing event

The 1990 Individual Long Track World Championship was the 20th edition of the FIM speedway Individual Long Track World Championship. The event was held on 19 August 1990 at Herxheim in Germany which was West Germany at the time.

The world title was won by Simon Wigg of England for the third time.

== Final Classification ==
Pos	Rider	Heat Pts	Heat Pts	Heat Pts	Heat Pts	Sf Pts	Final Pts	Total Pts
1	(England) Simon Wigg	6	5	7	5	7	7	37
2	(West Germany) Karl Maier	5	7	7	7	ef	4	30
3	(West Germany) Hans Otto Pingel	6	4	6	7	7	0	30
4	(Switzerland) Marcel Gerhard	7	7	4	ef	4	6	28
5	(West Germany) Klaus Lausch	7	5	5	6	ef	5	28
6	(England) Marvyn Cox	4	6	2	4	6	1	23
7	(Sweden) Erik Stenlund	5	3	5	6	ex	2	21
8	(Czechoslovakia) Borivoj Hadek	4	ef	2	5	5	3	19
9	(West Germany) Georg Limbrunner	f	1	6	3	5	E	15
10	(England) Mark Loram	3	0	3	3	6	E	15
11	(Czechoslovakia) Petr Vandirek	2	2	3	4	3	E	14
12	(Czechoslovakia) Aleš Dryml Sr.	2	2	4	2	ef	E	10
13	(England) Steve Schofield	0	4	1	1	3	E	9
14	(Czechoslovakia) Gerd Riss	3	6	f	-	-	E	9
15	(Czechoslovakia) Pavel Karnas	1	1	0	2	4	E	8
16	(West Germany) Mario Trupkovic	1	3	f	-	-	E	4
17	(Denmark) Jens Henry Nielsen	-	-	-	1	2	E	3
18	(Denmark) Finn Rune Jensen	-	-	-	0	2	E	2

- E = eliminated (no further ride)
- f = fell
- ef = engine failure
- x = excluded
