= Martin Hagon =

English speedway rider

- Born: 25 December 1961 (age 64); Hackney, England
- Nationality: British (English)

Career history
- 1981–1983: Hackney Hawks
- 1981: Rye House Rockets
- 1984–1986: Sheffield Tigers
- 1987: Ipswich Witches

Individual honours
- 1984: European Grasstrack Champion
- 1984, 1987: British Masters Grasstrack champion

Martin Peter Hagon (born 25 December 1961 in Hackney, England is a former motorcycle speedway, grasstrack and longtrack rider.

== Career ==
Hagon raced for Hackney Hawks during the 1982 British League season. After another season with them, he joined Sheffield Tigers for the 1984 British League season and would spend three seasons with them.

Peter Adams, the Wolverhampton Wolves promoter made inquiries towards Hagon at the beginning of the 1986 season but Hagon chose to join Ipswich Witches, where he spent his final season riding in league speedway.

Away from standard speedway, Hagon excelled in Longtrack and grasstrack and reached two Individual Speedway Long Track World Championship finals in 1985 and 1987. His last season was with Ipswich Witches in 1987.

== Personal life ==
Hagon is the son of Alf Hagon and his son is Sam Hagon (both speedway riders).

== World Longtrack Championship Record ==
- 1985 – (Denmark) Esbjerg 12pts (7th)
- 1987 – (Germany) Mühldorf 19pts (4th)
- 1988 – Qualifying Round
- 1989 – Semi-final
- 1990 – Semi-final
- 1991 – Semi-final

== European Grasstrack Championship ==
- 1982 – (Belgium) Damme 10pts (8th)
- 1983 – (West Germany) Nandlastadt 14pts (6th)
- 1984 – (Netherlands) Eenrum 24pts (Champion)

== British Masters Grasstrack Championship ==
- 1982 – (England) Exeter Finalist
- 1983 – (England) Long Marston Airfield Finalist
- 1984 – (England) Yarm (Champion)
- 1985 – (England) Andover Finalist
- 1986 – (England) Exeter (2nd)
- 1987 – (England) Andover (Champion)
- 1988 – (England) Abingdon Finalist
- 1989 – (England) Andover Finalist
- 1990 – (England) Bridgnorth (2nd)
- 1991 – (England) Tonbridge Finalist

== After racing ==
After his racing career, Hagon went into the business his father set up called 'Hagon Shocks'. Today, he runs the business and supplies many of the racing fraternity.
