= 1987 Individual Long Track World Championship =

Long track motorcycle racing event

The 1987 Individual Long Track World Championship was the 17th edition of the FIM speedway Individual Long Track World Championship. The event was held on 20 September 1987 in Mühldorf, Germany, which was West Germany at the time.

The world title was won by Karl Maier of West Germany for the third time.

== Final Classification ==
Pos	Rider	Heat Pts	Heat Pts	Heat Pts	Heat Pts	Heat Pts	Total Pts
1	(West Germany) Karl Maier	5	5	3	5	4	22
2	(England) Simon Wigg	1	5	5	5	5	21
3	(United States) Shawn Moran	5	4	4	3	3	19
4	(England) Martin Hagon	5	4	5	4	1	19
5	(West Germany) Egon Müller	4	3	5	3	0	15
6	(West Germany) Heinz Huber	3	3	4	2	2	14
7	(Denmark) Erik Gundersen	4	1	1	4	E	10
8	(Australia) Steve Baker	4	2	3	1	E	10
9	(West Germany) Gerd Riss	2	3	2	2	E	9
10	(Czechoslovakia) Lubomír Jedek	3	2	2	1	E	8
11	(West Germany) Alois Wiesböck	1	1	4	0	E	6
12	(Denmark) Finn Rune Jensen	1	5	0	ef	E	6
13	(England) Trevor Banks	0	2	3	E	E	5
14	(West Germany) Klaus Lausch	0	4	-	E	E	4
15	(Sweden) Erik Stenlund	2	f	1	E	E	3
16	(Finland) Kai Niemi	3	0	0	E	E	3
17	(England) Chris Morton	ef	1	1	E	E	2
18	(Czechoslovakia) Pavel Karnas	2	0	0	E	E	2
19	(England) Simon Cross	-	-	2	E	E	2

- E = eliminated (no further ride)
- f = fell
- ef = engine failure
- x = excluded
