= 1989 Individual Long Track World Championship =

Long track motorcycle racing event

The 1989 Individual Long Track World Championship was the 19th edition of the FIM speedway Individual Long Track World Championship. The event was held on 20 August 1989 at Mariánské Lázně in the Czech Republic which was Czechoslovakia at the time.

The world title was won by Simon Wigg of England for the second time.

== Final Classification ==
Pos	Rider	Heat Pts	Heat Pts	Heat Pts	Heat Pts	Sf Pts	Final Pts	Total Pts
1	(England) Simon Wigg	6	6	7	7	7	5	38
2	(Czechoslovakia) Aleš Dryml Sr.	5	7	7	5	6	7	37
3	(West Germany) Karl Maier	7	5	5	3	7	6	33
4	(Sweden) Erik Stenlund	5	x	6	7	6	4	28
5	(West Germany) Egon Müller	ef	3	5	6	5	3	22
6	(Denmark) Hans Nielsen	3	4	6	4	2	1	20
7	(West Germany) Andre Pollehn	f	6	2	6	3	2	19
8	(West Germany) Mario Trupkovic	7	7	2	2	1	ef	19
9	(Switzerland) Marcel Gerhard	4	4	4	2	3	E	17
10	(England) Marvyn Cox	4	5	3	x	4	E	16
11	(West Germany) Gerd Riss	6	ef	ef	1	5	E	12
12	(England) Steve Schofield	2	1	ef	5	4	E	12
13	(Czechoslovakia) Borivoj Hadek	2	3	3	4	0	E	12
14	(Czechoslovakia) Petr Vandirek	f	2	4	3	ef	E	9
15	(England) Chris Morton	3	2	1	1	1	E	8
16	(Czechoslovakia) Antonín Kasper Jr.	-	-	1	0	2	E	3
17	(West Germany) Klaus Lausch	ef	1	-	-	-	E	1

- E = eliminated (no further ride)
- f = fell
- ef = engine failure
- x = excluded
