= 1982 British Speedway Championship =

Seasons
- ← 1981 1983 →

The 1982 British Speedway Championship was the 22nd edition of the British Speedway Championship. The Final took place on 2 June at Brandon in Coventry, England. The Championship was won by Andy Grahame, who edged out his brother Alan Grahame in second and Kenny Carter in third.

== British Final ==
- 2 June 1982
- (England) Brandon Stadium, Coventry

Placing	Rider	Total	1	2	3	4	5	6	7	8	9	10	11	12	13	14	15	16	17	18	19	20	Pts	Pos	21
1	(England) (7) Andy Grahame	14		3					3					3	3					2			14	1	
2	(England) (9) Alan Grahame	13			3		2						2					3		3			13	2	
3	(England) (14) Kenny Carter	12				2		3					3		2							2	12	3	
4	(England) (12) Phil Collins	11			2					3		2			1						3		11	4	
5	(England) (16) Chris Morton	10				3				1	3						2			1			10	5	
6	(England) (5) Peter Collins	10		2			3					3					1					1	10	6	
7	(England) (4) Les Collins	9	0							2				2				2				3	9	7	
8	(England) (10) Dave Jessup	8			E			2						0			3		3				8	8	
9	(England) (2) Michael Lee	7	3					1				1				2				0			7	9	
10	(England) (1) Paul Woods	6	2				1				1				0				2				6	10	
11	(Zimbabwe) (6) Mike Ferreira	6		1				0			2							1			2		6	11	
12	(England) (13) John Davis	5				0	0							1		3					1		5	12	
13	(England) (15) Simon Wigg	4				1			2			0						0	1				4	13	
14	(England) (11) Malcolm Holloway	3			1				1		0					1						0	3	14	
15	(England) (3) Kevin Jolly	2	1						0				1				0				0		2	15	
16	(England) (8) John Louis	0		0						0			0			E			E				0	16	
R1	(England) (R1) Gordon Kennett	0																					0	R1	
R2	(England) (R2) Melvyn Taylor	0																					0	R2	
Placing	Rider	Total	1	2	3	4	5	6	7	8	9	10	11	12	13	14	15	16	17	18	19	20	Pts	Pos	21

m - exclusion for exceeding two minute time allowance • t - exclusion for touching the tapes • x - other exclusion • e - retired or mechanical failure • f - fell • ns - non-starter • nc - non-classify

gate A - inside	gate B	gate C	gate D - outside

== British Under 21 final ==
Peter Carr won the British Speedway Under 21 Championship. The final was held at Kingsmead Stadium on 31 July.

Pos.	Rider	Points
1	Peter Carr	12+3
2	Martin Hagon	12+2
3	Simon Cross	12+1
4	Neil Evitts	11
5	Paul Stead	11
6	Carl Baldwin	10
7	Martin Hewlett	8
8	Nigel Sparshott	8
9	Glenn Parrott	6
10	Rob Woffinden	6
11	Paul Price	6
12	Kenny McKinna	5
13	Paul Bosley	4
14	Keith Millard	3
15	Rob Tilbury	3
16	Paul Evitts	1
17	Kevin Howland (res)	1
18	Dave Mullett (res)	0

== See also ==
- British Speedway Championship
- 1982 Individual Speedway World Championship
