= 1991 Individual Long Track World Championship =

Long track motorcycle racing event

The 1991 Individual Long Track World Championship was the 21st edition of the FIM speedway Individual Long Track World Championship. The event was held on 28 July 1991 at Mariánské Lázně in the Czech Republic, which was Czechoslovakia at the time.

The Championship format returned to the 18 rider field format with 6 riders in each heat.

The world title was won by Gerd Riss of Germany.

== Final Classification ==
| Pos | Rider | Heat Pts | Heat Pts | Heat Pts | Heat Pts | Heat Pts | Total Pts |
|---|---|---|---|---|---|---|---|
| 1 | (Germany) Gerd Riss | 5 | 5 | 4 | 5 | 5 | 24 |
| 2 | (Czechoslovakia) Aleš Dryml Sr. | 5 | 4 | 5 | 3 | 4 | 21 |
| 3 | (Denmark) Jan O. Pedersen | 4 | 4 | 5 | 5 | 3 | 21 |
| 4 | (Switzerland) Marcel Gerhard | 5 | 4 | 4 | 4 | 1 | 18 |
| 5 | (New Zealand) Mitch Shirra | 4 | 5 | 5 | 1 | 2 | 17 |
| 6 | (Sweden) Stefan Dannö | 3 | 5 | 0 | 4 | ef | 12 |
| 7 | (Germany) Karl Maier | 4 | 3 | 3 | ef | E | 10 |
| 8 | (England) Andy Smith | 2 | 2 | 4 | 2 | E | 10 |
| 9 | (England) Simon Wigg | 2 | 2 | 3 | 3 | E | 10 |
| 10 | (England) Mark Loram | 1 | 3 | 2 | 2 | E | 8 |
| 11 | (Germany) Klaus Lausch | 3 | 3 | 1 | 0 | E | 7 |
| 12 | (England) Marvyn Cox | 2 | 2 | 2 | 1 | E | 7 |
| 13 | (England) Steve Schofield | 3 | 1 | 1 | E | E | 5 |
| 14 | (Sweden) Erik Stenlund | 1 | 0 | 3 | E | E | 4 |
| 15 | (Germany) Hans Otto Pingel | 0 | 1 | 2 | E | E | 3 |
| 16 | (Germany) Walter Scherwitzki | ef | ef | 1 | E | E | 1 |
| 17 | (Czechoslovakia) Jan Holub | 1 | 0 | ef | E | E | 1 |
| 18 | (Czechoslovakia) Borivoj Hadek | ef | 1 | 0 | E | E | 1 |

- E = eliminated (no further ride)
- f = fell
- ef = engine failure
- x = excluded
