= 1997 FIM Long Track World Championship =

World longtrack motorcycle speedway event

1997 Individual Long Track World Championship

The 1997 Individual Long Track/Grasstrack World Championship was the 27th edition of the FIM speedway Individual Long Track World Championship. For the first time the Championship was decided on a Grand Prix system (a series of races) and also contained races on grasstrack.

The new system combined with the relatively new Speedway World Championship Grand Prix which started in 1995, effectively resulted in a separation of speedway riders. The leading speedway riders (with the exception of several Long Track specialists) could not commit to the Longtrack/Grasstrack schedule and therefore competed in the Speedway World Championship. The days of a speedway world champion in both normal track and Long Track speedway were gone.

The world title was won by Tommy Dunker of Germany.

== Venues ==
Round	Date	Venue
1	12 Jul	(Netherlands) Aduard
2	20 Jul	(Germany) Cloppenburg
3	17 Aug	(Germany) Pfarrkirchen
4	6 Sep	(France) Marmande
5	28 Sep	(Czech Republic) Mariánské Lázně

== Final Classification ==
Pos	Rider	Round 1	Round 2	Round 3	Round 4	Round 5	Total Pts
1	(Germany) Tommy Dunker	20	10	25	16	18	89
2	(England) Steve Schofield	11	25	11	13	25	85
3	(England) Glenn Cunningham	25	16	16	8	11	76
4	(Italy) Massimo Mora	13	13	8	18	16	68
5	(Germany) Egon Müller	5	18	20	9	14	66
6	(Czech Republic) Zdenek Schneiderwind	18	11	12	14	10	65
7	(France) Philippe Bergé	12	9	18	12	13	64
8	(Germany) Matthias Kröger	9	20	14	7	12	62
9	(Australia) Steve Johnston	16	8	9	20	5	58
10	(England) Jeremy Doncaster	14	14	13	4	9	54
11	(England) Paul Hurry	6	12	1	25	7	51
12	(Czech Republic) Bohumil Brhel	8	7	7	1	20	43
13	(Czech Republic) Pavel Ondrašík	7	2	10	10	6	35
14	(France) Christophe Dubernard	10	3	6	11	2	32
15	(Ukraine) Vladimir Trofimov	4	x	5	2	8	19
16	(Germany) Herbert Rudolph	3	4	3	3	4	17
17	(Germany) Thorsten Kerl	2	5	2	x	1	10
18	(Czech Republic) Václav Milík Sr.	x	x	4	x	3	7
19	(Poland) Adam Labedzki	x	x	x	6	x	6
20	(Australia) Shane Parker	x	6	x	x	x	6
21	(Russia) Oleg Kurguskin	x	x	x	5	x	5
22	(Germany) Walter Scherwitzki	1	x	x	x	x	1
23	(Australia) Mark Lemon	x	1	x	x	x	1
