= 1984 Individual Long Track World Championship =

Speedway event

The 1984 Individual Long Track World Championship was the 14th edition of the FIM speedway Individual Long Track World Championship. The event was held on 16 September 1984 at the Sandbahn Rennen Herxheim in Herxheim, Germany, which was West Germany at the time.

The world title was won by Erik Gundersen of Denmark.

== Final Classification ==
Pos	Rider	Heat Pts	Heat Pts	Heat Pts	Heat Pts	Heat Pts	Total Pts
1	(Denmark) Erik Gundersen	5	5	4	5	4	23
2	(West Germany) Egon Müller	4	4	3	3	5	19
3	(West Germany) Karl Maier	5	4	5	x	3	17
4	(England) Peter Collins	5	5	4	2	x	16
5	(Denmark) Finn Rune Jensen	4	5	1	4	2	16
6	(West Germany) Gerd Riss	3	1	4	4	1	13
7	(Czechoslovakia) Aleš Dryml Sr.	0	0	5	5	E	10
8	(Czechoslovakia) Jiří Štancl	3	3	ef	3	E	9
9	(Switzerland) Marcel Gerhard	4	2	1	2	E	9
10	(Australia) John Titman	0	3	5	ef	E	8
11	(England) Jeremy Doncaster	2	2	3	ef	E	7
12	(Denmark) Hans Nielsen	2	4	ef	1	E	7
13	(New Zealand) Ivan Mauger	1	3	1	E	E	5
14	(West Germany) Josef Aigner	1	2	2	E	E	5
15	(West Germany) Hans Otto Pingel	3	1	ef	E	E	4
16	(Finland) Kai Niemi	2	0	2	E	E	4
17	(England) Les Collins	1	1	2	E	E	4
18	(United States) Shawn Moran	ef	0	3	E	E	3

- E = eliminated (no further ride)
- f = fell
- ef = engine failure
- x = excluded
