= Marcel Gerhard =

- Born: 25 August 1955 (age 71); Frauenfeld, Switzerland
- Nationality: Swiss

Current club information
- Career status: Retired

Individual honours
- 1992: Long Track World Champion
- 1997: Argentinian Champion
- 1992: German Longtrack Silver Helmet Winner
- 1991: German Grasstrack Silver Helmet Winner

Marcel Gerhard (born 25 August 1955) is a Swiss former speedway rider.

== Career ==
Gerhard competed in speedway, Longtrack and Grasstrack racing. He reached twelve World Longtrack world championship finals and took the top honours in 1992.

In 1997, Gerhard won the Argentine Championship.

== World Longtrack Championship ==
=== Finals ===
- 1982 (Denmark) Esbjerg (12th) 6pts
- 1983 (Czech Republic) Mariánské Lázně (16th) 3pts
- 1984 (Germany) Herxheim (9th) 9pts
- 1985 (Denmark) Esbjerg (19th) 0pts
- 1986 (Germany) Herxheim (Third) 18pts
- 1989 (Czech Republic) Mariánské Lázně (9th) 17pts
- 1990 (Germany) Herxheim (4th) 28pts
- 1991 (Czech Republic) Mariánské Lázně (4th) 18pts
- 1992 (Germany) Pfarrkirchen (Champion) 23pts
- 1993 (Germany) Mühldorf (Third) 16pts, after run-off
- 1994 (Czech Republic) Mariánské Lázně (7th) 11pts
- 1996 (Germany) Herxheim (4th) 18pts

=== Semi-finals ===
- 1987 (Czech Republic) Mariánské Lázně (15th) 3pts
- 1988 (Germany) Jubeck (11th) 12pts
- 1995 (Germany) Harsewinkel (Did not start)
