= 1988 Individual Long Track World Championship =

Long track motorcycle racing event

The 1988 Individual Long Track World Championship was the 18th edition of the FIM speedway Individual Long Track World Championship. The event was held on 18 September 1988 at Scheeßel in Germany, which was West Germany at the time.

The Championship format was altered with 16 rider fields and 8 riders in each heat. The top 8 scorers qualified for the semi-final heats with (points carried forward).

The world title was won by Karl Maier of West Germany for the fourth time.

== Final Classification ==
Pos	Rider	Heat Pts	Heat Pts	Heat Pts	Heat Pts	Heat Pts	Heat Pts	Total Pts
1	(West Germany) Karl Maier	7	7	7	7	7	7	42
2	(West Germany) Klaus Lausch	7	6	7	6	6	ef	32
3	(England) Chris Morton	2	7	6	7	3	6	31
4	(Denmark) Hans Nielsen	4	6	6	ef	7	4	27
5	(West Germany) Gerd Riss	5	4	4	4	4	5	26
6	(West Germany) Heinrich Diener	6	3	5	5	5	2	26
7	(Sweden) Roland Dannö	6	5	ef	6	6	1	24
8	(England) Simon Wigg	3	2	4	5	4	3	21
9	(West Germany) Egon Müller	3	4	5	3	ef	E	15
10	(Denmark) Jens Henry Nielsen	5	5	1	2	2	E	15
11	(United States) Sam Ermolenko	4	x	ef	4	5	E	13
12	(Finland) Kai Niemi	2	1	3	1	2	E	9
13	(Czechoslovakia) Petr Vandirek	0	0	3	3	3	E	9
14	(England) Steve Schofield	0	1	2	2	1	E	6
15	(Czechoslovakia) Antonín Kasper Jr.	1	3	f	-	-	E	4
16	(England) Simon Cross	1	2	ef	ef	-	E	3
17	(Australia) Steve Baker	-	-	-	1	1	E	2
18	(Finland) Ari Koponen	-	-	2	-	0	E	2

- E = eliminated (no further ride)
- f = fell
- ef = engine failure
- x = excluded
