= 1985 Individual Long Track World Championship =

Long track motorcycle racing event

The 1985 Individual Long Track World Championship was the 15th edition of the FIM speedway Individual Long Track World Championship. The event was held on 15 September 1985 at the Korskro Motor Centre in Esbjerg in Denmark.

The world title was won by Simon Wigg of England.

== Final Classification ==
Pos	Rider	Heat Pts	Heat Pts	Heat Pts	Heat Pts	Heat Pts	Total Pts
1	(England) Simon Wigg	3	4	5	5	5	22
2	(Czechoslovakia) Jiří Štancl	4	5	4	2	4	19
3	(England) Peter Collins	5	4	3	3	3	18
4	(United States) Shawn Moran	2	5	5	5	ef	17
5	(West Germany) Egon Müller	5	5	4	1	2	17
6	(United States) Bobby Schwartz	4	3	5	3	ef	15
7	(England) Martin Hagon	5	0	3	4	E	12
8	(West Germany) Gerd Riss	ef	3	4	4	E	11
9	(England) Jeremy Doncaster	3	4	ef	2	E	9
10	(West Germany) Georg Hack	2	3	2	0	E	7
11	(West Germany) Klaus Lausch	4	0	1	1	E	6
12	(Denmark) Finn Rune Jensen	1	1	3	0	E	5
13	(Czechoslovakia) Václav Verner	2	2	1	E	E	5
14	(Czechoslovakia) Aleš Dryml Sr.	1	1	2	E	E	4
15	(New Zealand) Ivan Mauger	3	1	0	E	E	4
16	(Czechoslovakia) Petr Ondrašík	1	2	1	E	E	4
17	(West Germany) Heinrich Diener	0	0	2	E	E	2
18	(Denmark) Brian Jacobsen	-	2	-	E	E	2
19	(Switzerland) Marcel Gerhard	f	-	-	E	E	0
20	(England) Chris Morton	-	-	ef	E	E	0

- E = eliminated (no further ride)
- f = fell
- ef = engine failure
- x = excluded
