= 1994 Individual Long Track World Championship =

Long track motorcycle racing event

The 1994 Individual Long Track World Championship was the 24th edition of the FIM speedway Individual Long Track World Championship. The event was held on 25 September 1994 at the Mariánské Lázně in the Czech Republic.

The world title was won by Simon Wigg of England for the fifth time.

== Final Classification ==
Pos	Rider	Heat Pts	Heat Pts	Heat Pts	Heat Pts	Heat Pts	Total Pts
1	(England) Simon Wigg	5	5	5	5	5	25
2	(Germany) Andre Pollehn	3	5	5	5	2	20
3	(Germany) Gerd Riss	4	5	5	3	ef	17
4	(Germany) Egon Müller	4	3	4	3	3	17
5	(Czech Republic) Aleš Dryml Sr.	3	2	3	4	4	16
6	(Germany) Bernd Diener	3	4	3	4	1	15
7	(Switzerland) Marcel Gerhard	5	2	2	2 E	E	11
8	(Czech Republic) Bohumil Brhel	2	4	1	2	E	9
9	(Sweden) Henrik Gustafsson	5	ef	4	0	E	9
10	(England) Mark Loram	2	3	3	1	E	9
11	(England) Kelvin Tatum	ef	4	4	1	E	9
12	(England) Joe Screen	4	2	2	0	E	8
13	(Australia) Jason Crump	1	3	1	E	E	5
14	(Germany) Robert Barth	2	f	2	E	E	4
15	(Italy) Massimo Mora	1	1	0	E	E	2
16	(Argentina) Luis Vallejos	1	1	ef	E	E	2
17	(Russia) Oleg Kurguskin	0	1	0	E	E	1
18	(England) Marvyn Cox	f	ef	ef	E	E	0

- E = eliminated (no further ride)
- f = fell
- ef = engine failure
- x = excluded
