= 1995 Individual Long Track World Championship =

Long track motorcycle racing event

The 1995 Individual Long Track World Championship was the 25th edition of the FIM speedway Individual Long Track World Championship. The event was held on 17 September 1995 at the Eichenring motorcycle speedway arena in Scheeßel, Germany.

The world title was won by Kelvin Tatum of England after he defeated five times champion Simon Wigg in a run off for the gold medal.

== Final Classification ==
Pos	Rider	Heat Pts	Heat Pts	Heat Pts	Heat Pts	Heat Pts	Total Pts
1	(England) Kelvin Tatum	5	5	ef	5	5	20
2	(England) Simon Wigg	5	4	5	3	3	20
3	(Germany) Walter Scherwitzki	5	4	3	5	1	18
4	(England) Marvyn Cox	3	4	4	2	4	17
5	(Czech Republic) Bohumil Brhel	4	5	4	2	2	17
6	(Germany) Karl Maier	ef	5	5	4	ef	14
7	(Australia) Jason Crump	4	2	4	3	E	13
8	(Czech Republic) Aleš Dryml Sr.	3	x	5	4	E	12
9	(England) Simon Cross	4	3	3	1	E	11
10	(Germany) Andre Pollehn	1	3	2	0	E	6
11	(England) Jeremy Doncaster	2	0	3	1	E	6
12	(France) Philippe Bergé	2	2	1	ef	E	5
13	(Germany) Robert Barth	2	2	ef	E	E	4
14	(Netherlands) Anne van der Helm	1	1	2	E	E	4
15	(Germany) Bernd Diener	3	ef	ef	E	E	3
16	(Sweden) Stefan Dannö	ef	3	ef	E	E	3
17	(Czech Republic) Zdenek Schneiderwind	1	0	2	E	E	3
18	(England) Steve Bishop	0	1	0	E	E	1
19	(England) Steve Schofield	-	1	-	E	E	1

- E = eliminated (no further ride)
- f = fell
- ef = engine failure
- x = excluded

== Gold Medal ==
- Run-off Tatum beat Wigg
