= 1983 Individual Long Track World Championship =

Long track motorcycle racing event

The 1983 Individual Long Track World Championship was the 13th edition of the FIM speedway Individual Long Track World Championship. The event was held on 18 September 1983 in Mariánské Lázně, Czechoslovakia (present-day Czech Republic). The world title was won by Shawn Moran of the United States.

== Final classification ==
Pos	Rider	Heat Pts	Heat Pts	Heat Pts	Heat Pts	Heat Pts	Total Pts
1	(United States) Shawn Moran	5	4	5	5	3	22
2	(Czechoslovakia) Jiří Štancl	5	4	4	2	5	20
3	(West Germany) Karl Maier	5	2	5	2	4	18
4	(West Germany) Alois Wiesböck	4	5	5	1	1	16
5	(Denmark) Finn Rune Jensen	2	5	4	5	0	16
6	(Czechoslovakia) Aleš Dryml Sr.	3	3	3	3	2	14
7	(England) Simon Wigg	4	5	2	0	E	11
8	(West Germany) Egon Müller	3	3	1	4	E	11
9	(New Zealand) Ivan Mauger	3	1	3	4	E	11
10	(West Germany) Georg Hack	4	4	1	0	E	9
11	(Australia) John Titman	1	3	2	3	E	9
12	(Denmark) Hans Nielsen	2	ef	4	1	E	7
13	(United States) Bobby Schwartz	ef	2	2	E	E	4
14	(Denmark) Ole Olsen	1	1	1	E	E	3
15	(England) Les Collins	0	0	3	E	E	3
16	(Switzerland) Marcel Gerhard	1	2	f	E	E	3
17	(West Germany) Hans Otto Pingel	2	0	0	E	E	2
18	(West Germany) Heinrich Diener	ef	1	0	E	E	1

- E = eliminated (no further ride)
- f = fell
- ef = engine failure
- x = excluded
