= 1983 British Speedway Championship =

23rd edition of the British Speedway Championship

Seasons
- ← 1982 1984 →

The 1983 British Speedway Championship was the 23rd edition of the British Speedway Championship. The Final took place on 1 June at Brandon in Coventry, England. The Championship was won by Chris Morton, with Michael Lee second and Andy Grahame, who was the champion in the previous edition, winning a run-off against Kenny Carter, Peter Collins and John Davis for third.

== British Final ==
- 1 June 1983
- (England) Brandon Stadium, Coventry

Placing	Rider	Total	1	2	3	4	5	6	7	8	9	10	11	12	13	14	15	16	17	18	19	20	Pts	Pos	21
1	(England) (4) Chris Morton	12	2							2				3				2				3	12	1	
2	(England) (12) Michael Lee	11			0					3		2			3						3		11	2	
3	(England) (9) Andy Grahame	10			2		0						2					3		3			10	3	3
4	(England) (5) Kenny Carter	10		2			3					0					3					2	10	4	2
5	(England) (1) Peter Collins	10	1				1				3				2				3				10	5	1
6	(England) (13) John Davis	10				2	2							2		2					2		10	6	0
7	(England) (2) Phil Collins	9	0					3				1				3				2			9	7	
8	(England) (15) Les Collins	8				0			2			3						1	2				8	8	
9	(England) (3) Paul Woods	7	3						1				1				1				1		7	9	
10	(England) (11) Dave Jessup	6			3				3		F					M						M	6	10	
11	(England) (14) Simon Wigg	6				3		0					3		0							E	6	11	
12	(England) (6) Gordon Kennett	6		3				1			2							0			0		6	12	
13	(England) (16) Colin Richardson	6				1				1	1						2			1			6	13	
14	(England) (10) Malcolm Simmons	5			1			2						1			0		1				5	14	
15	(England) (7) Sean Willmott	2		1					0					0	1					0			2	15	
16	(England) (8) Neil Collins	1		0						0			E			1			0				1	16	
R1	(England) (R1) Kevin Hawkins	1														0						1	1	R1	
Placing	Rider	Total	1	2	3	4	5	6	7	8	9	10	11	12	13	14	15	16	17	18	19	20	Pts	Pos	21

m - exclusion for exceeding two minute time allowance • t - exclusion for touching the tapes • x - other exclusion • e - retired or mechanical failure • f - fell • ns - non-starter • nc - non-classify

gate A - inside	gate B	gate C	gate D - outside

== British Under 21 final ==
Keith Millard won the British Speedway Under 21 Championship. The final was held at Kingsmead Stadium on 30 July.

Pos.	Rider	Points
1	Keith Millard	13+3
2	Simon Cross	13+2
3	Kenny McKinna	12
4	Paul Stead	11
5	Marvyn Cox	9
6	Kelvin Tatum	9
7	Paul Clarke	7
8	Alun Rossiter	7
9	Jamie Luckhurst	7
10	Kevin Price	7
11	Carl Baldwin	6
12	Carl Blackbird	6
13	Andy Smith	5
14	Julian Parr	3
15	Jeremy Luckhurst (res)	3
16	John Frankland	0
17	Gary O'Hare	0
18	Jay Pleece (res)	0

== See also ==
- British Speedway Championship
- 1983 Individual Speedway World Championship
