= Grasstrack =

Motorcycle racing format

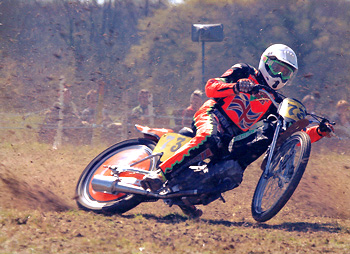
- 500 cc grasstrack bike

Presence
- Olympic: No
- Paralympic: No

Motorcycle grasstrack is a form of track racing which typically, in its current form, takes place on a flat track consisting of two straights and two bends usually constructed in a field. It is one of the oldest types of motorcycle sports in the UK with the first meetings having taken place in the 1920s.

== History ==
In the United Kingdom, kidney-shaped circuits were sometimes used to include a right hand bend, and undulating hillsides were also used to increase the challenge for riders. The events traditionally occurred after haymaking and before harvesting season on newly-cut fields. Postwar grasstrack circuits included "permanent" venues such as Brands Hatch and Mallory Park which were not simple oval shapes, although solo motorcycle races were run in an anti-clockwise direction. Later, these were converted into tarmac circuits with races using the more common clockwise direction associated with modern roadracing.

In the modern era, it is generally similar to Speedway with races usually taking place over 4 laps from a standing start. Unlike speedway, which has 4 riders per race, Grasstrack racing can have many riders in each heat and the circuit is normally longer allowing higher speeds. Grasstrack has three solo classes, 250 cc, 350 cc and 500 cc together with three sidecar classes; left-handed 500 cc and 1000 cc (turning left) and right-handed 1000 cc (turning right).

The British grasstrack season usually starts in early spring around the Easter holidays and runs through the summer/autumn months. More interesting racing takes place at larger roped tracks including the Poacher and ASTRA Champion of Champions and Grand Slam meetings in Kent and in particular at the famous Rhodes Minnis circuit.

The pinnacle of the domestic grasstrack season is the British Masters Championships. This official ACU championship is where the British champion is crowned in the mainstream 500 cc solo and 1000 cc right hand sidecar classes. Many famous speedway riders such as 1976 world champion Peter Collins started their racing careers in grasstrack. Some speedway riders continue to take part in national grasstrack meetings when their schedule permits. Grand Prix road racers John Surtees and Gary Hocking also began their racing careers in grass track competitions. Other competitors from the postwar era included now-famous names such as Bernie Ecclestone and Murray Walker.

In Europe the same sport is often called long track racing. This is exactly the same setup as British grasstrack which has tracks normally around 600–800 meters in length, but is held on the continent with tracks up to 1000–1200 meters in length and with speeds reaching 90 mph – 100 mph. The machinery used is the same as are the riders.

== Grasstrack motorcycles ==
Grasstrack racing motorcycles look quite similar to speedway machines but there are different engine capacity limits for each class. In the UK there are classes for 250 cc (normally 2-stroke engines), 350 cc and 500 cc bikes (usually 4-stroke engines). Unlike speedway bikes which have no gears, grasstrack bikes usually have a 2 speed gearbox. Both speedway and grasstrack bike have no brakes. The only other main difference is that speedway bikes have no rear suspension and are shorter in length, usually by around 10–12 inches.

Also there is a class called Pre-75. These are bikes that have been made before 1975. The three classes in Pre-75, are 250, 350 and 500 cc.

As well as solo racing, sidecar racing is also quite popular and often very spectacular. There are mainly three recognised classes, 500 cc (using solo 4-stroke engines) and two 1000 cc classes (using stock road bike engines). Again, they all run on methanol, and the 500 cc class and the 1000 cc lefthand sidecar class run anti-clockwise around the oval track, and the 1000 cc class clockwise. The reason behind the difference in direction is often asked, the main reason being the origin of each class. The 500 cc sidecars having been developed in mainland Europe, where drivers drive on the right of the road. The 1000 cc sidecar has been developed in the UK where road users drive on the left. Therefore, the sidecar wheel is always found on the nearside of the vehicle.

The fastest recorded oval lap record is held by UK's Kelvin Tatum MBE at Rastede (1000 m grass/sand surface) in Germany at an average speed of 144.31 km/h.

== Junior grasstrack ==
Riders can start in grasstrack racing at a young age (6 years old in the UK). Junior grasstrack clubs cater for riders with motocross bikes as well as grasstrack machines.

The ACU hold a national Youth Championship each season.

Current ACU British Youth Champions

Class	Champion
Autos	Jacob Penfold
Cadets	Leo Sturgeon
Juniors	Cooper Rushen
Intermediates	Cameron Taylor

== Organisation ==
Whilst there are several grasstrack racing clubs in the UK, the sport is regulated by the governing body of British motorcycle sport, the Auto Cycle Union (ACU) who organise an annual British championship.

== British Championships ==
The British Grasstrack Championships take place at two separate events. The 250 cc and 350 cc solo, 500 cc sidecar and 1000 cc left hand sidecar championships take place at the ACU British National Championships. The 500 cc Solos and 1000 cc right hand sidecar champions are decided at the ACU British Masters Championships. Qualification for the National Championships are by way of a National Gradings List. There is a British Masters Qualifying event held to determine qualification for the British Masters Final event.

The British Championships are important events, particularly for 500 cc solo and 500 cc sidecar riders. The results of the championships determine who is to represent the nation on an international level for the FIM World Longtrack Championships and the UEM European Sidecar Championships. More recently a world championship has emerged for 1000 cc right hand sidecars. Qualification is determined on results from both the British Masters event and the British Sidecar Speedway Championships. Many 500 cc solo riders race grasstrack for their profession, therefore a good result in the British Masters is essential.

=== British Masters Championship ===
500cc Solo

Year	First	Second	Third
1982	(United Kingdom) Simon Wigg	(United Kingdom) Steve Schofield	(United Kingdom) Sean Wilmott
1983	(United Kingdom) Simon Wigg	(United Kingdom) Simon Cross	(United Kingdom) Steve Schofield
1984	(United Kingdom) Martin Hagon	(United Kingdom) Trevor Banks	(United Kingdom) Simon Cross
1985	(United Kingdom) Simon Wigg	(United Kingdom) Peter Carr	(United Kingdom) Trevor Banks
1986	(United Kingdom) Simon Cross	(United Kingdom) Martin Hagon	(United Kingdom) Trevor Banks
1987	(United Kingdom) Martin Hagon	(United Kingdom) Trevor Banks	(United Kingdom) Nigel Da'Ath
1988	(United Kingdom) Steve Schofield	(United Kingdom) Trevor Banks	(United Kingdom) Jeremy Doncaster
1989	(United Kingdom) Simon Wigg	(United Kingdom) Clayton Williams	(United Kingdom) Paul Fry
1990	(United Kingdom) Simon Wigg	(United Kingdom) Martin Hagon	(United Kingdom) Paul Fry
1991	(United Kingdom) Mark Loram	(United Kingdom) Jeremy Doncaster	(United Kingdom) Simon Wigg
1992	(United Kingdom) Joe Screen	(United Kingdom) Steve Schofield	(United Kingdom) Jeremy Doncaster
1993	(United Kingdom) Mark Loram	(United Kingdom) Trevor Banks	(United Kingdom) Kelvin Tatum
1994	(United Kingdom) Simon Cross	(United Kingdom) Steve Schofield	(United Kingdom) Kelvin Tatum
1995	(United Kingdom) Joe Screen	(United Kingdom) Kelvin Tatum	(United Kingdom) Simon Cross
1996	(United Kingdom) Kelvin Tatum	(United Kingdom) Steve Schofield	(United Kingdom) Jeremy Doncaster
1997	(United Kingdom) Paul Hurry	(United Kingdom) Kelvin Tatum	(United Kingdom) Trevor Banks
1998	cancelled due to Weather		
1999	(United Kingdom) Kelvin Tatum	(United Kingdom) Joe Screen	(United Kingdom) Scott Nicholls
2000	(United Kingdom) Kelvin Tatum	(United Kingdom) Paul Hurry	(United Kingdom) Glenn Cunningham
2001	(United Kingdom) Kelvin Tatum/Glenn Cunningham		(United Kingdom) Paul Hurry
2002	(United Kingdom) Paul Hurry	(United Kingdom) Joe Screen	(United Kingdom) Andrew Appleton
2003	(United Kingdom) Joe Screen	(United Kingdom) Matt Read	(United Kingdom) Kelvin Tatum
2004	(United Kingdom) Paul Hurry	(United Kingdom) Andrew Appleton	(United Kingdom) Jason Handley
2005	(United Kingdom) Paul Hurry	(United Kingdom) Jason Handley	(United Kingdom) David Howe
2006	(United Kingdom) Andrew Appleton	(United Kingdom) Richard Smith	(United Kingdom) Jamie Rodgers
2007	(United Kingdom) Glen Phillips	(United Kingdom) Paul Hurry	(United Kingdom) Joe Screen
2008	(United Kingdom) Jason Handley	(United Kingdom) Paul Cooper	(United Kingdom) Glen Phillips
2009	(United Kingdom) Lewis Denham	(United Kingdom) Jamie Rodgers	(United Kingdom) Andrew Appleton
2010	(United Kingdom) Andrew Appleton	(United Kingdom) Jamie Rodgers	(United Kingdom) Tim Nobes
2011	(United Kingdom) Andrew Appleton	(United Kingdom) Glen Phillips	(United Kingdom) Tom Perry
2012	(Australia) Cameron Woodward	(United Kingdom) Tom Perry	(United Kingdom) Glen Phillips
2013	(Australia) Cameron Woodward	(United Kingdom) Andrew Appleton	(United Kingdom) Paul Cooper
2014	(United Kingdom) Andrew Appleton	(United Kingdom) David Howe	(United Kingdom) Paul Cooper
2015	(United Kingdom) James Shanes	(United Kingdom) Andrew Appleton	(United Kingdom) James Wright
2016	(United Kingdom) James Shanes	(United Kingdom) Edward Kennett	(United Kingdom) Paul Hurry
2017	(United Kingdom) James Shanes	(United Kingdom) Paul Hurry	(United Kingdom) Edward Kennett
2018	(United Kingdom) Zach Wajtknecht	(United Kingdom) James Shanes	(United Kingdom) Andrew Appleton
2019	(United Kingdom) James Shanes	(United Kingdom) Zach Wajtknecht	(United Kingdom) Paul Hurry
2020	cancelled due to COVID		
2021	(United Kingdom) Chris Harris	(United Kingdom) James Shanes	(United Kingdom) Mitch Godden

1000cc Sidecar

Year	First	Second	Third
1982	(United Kingdom) Dave Manning & Peter Blanke	(United Kingdom) Pete Brown & John Morron	(United Kingdom) Steve Smith & Trevor Pye
1983	(United Kingdom) Steve Smith & Trevor Pye	(United Kingdom) Roger Measor & Jeff Measor	(United Kingdom) Ted Tucker & Dave Ward
1984	(United Kingdom) Alan Blewitt & Barry Metcalfe	(United Kingdom) Steve Dewison & Chris Brown	(United Kingdom) Ted Tucker & Dave Ward
1985	(United Kingdom) Roger Measor & Dave Harris	(United Kingdom) Pete Brown & Craig Cheetam	(United Kingdom) Steve Dewison & Chris Brown
1986	(United Kingdom) Roger Measor & Dave Harris	(United Kingdom) Ken Lane & Paul Urycz	(United Kingdom) Steve Dewison & Dave Ward
1987	(United Kingdom) Steve Dewison & Dave Ward	(United Kingdom) Roger Measor & Dave Harris	(United Kingdom) Dave Manning & Peter Blanke
1988	(United Kingdom) Steve Dewison & Dave Ward	(United Kingdom) Roger Measor & Dave Harris	(United Kingdom) Richard Piggott & Tony Angelico
1989	(United Kingdom) Steve Dewison & Dave Ward	(United Kingdom) Richard Piggott & Tony Angelico	(United Kingdom) Alan Blewitt & John Blewitt
1990	(United Kingdom) Steve Smith & Keith Wall	(United Kingdom) Roger Measor & Steve Bailey	(United Kingdom) Alan Blewitt & John Blewitt
1991	(United Kingdom) Richard Piggott & Martin Bailey	(United Kingdom) Roger Measor & Steve Bailey	(United Kingdom) Russel Ing & Paul Urycz
1992	(United Kingdom) Ken Lane & Mark Edwards	(United Kingdom) Russel Ing & Paul Urycz	(United Kingdom) Gary Jackson & Kevin Williams
1993	(United Kingdom) Ivor Matthews & Peter Jones	(United Kingdom) Russel Ing & Paul Urycz	(United Kingdom) Ken Lane & Mark Edwards
1994	(United Kingdom) Roger Measor & Shane Lapham	(United Kingdom) Ivor Matthews & Peter Jones	(United Kingdom) Gary Jackson & Kevin Williams
1995	(United Kingdom) Roger Measor & Shane Lapham	(United Kingdom) Mark Edwards & Nick Walters	(United Kingdom) Gary Jackson & Mick Stace
1996	(United Kingdom) Gary Jackson & Mick Stace	(United Kingdom) Mark Edwards & Nick Walters	(United Kingdom) Roger Measor & Shane Lapham
1997	(United Kingdom) Gary Jackson & Mick Stace	(United Kingdom) Rob Wilson & Tony Miles	(United Kingdom) John Halsey & Jason Glenie
1998	cancelled due to Weather		
1999	(United Kingdom) John Halsey & Jason Glenie	(United Kingdom) Gary Jackson & Carl Pugh	(United Kingdom) Rob Wilson & Tony Miles
2000	(United Kingdom) Rob Wilson & Tony Miles	(United Kingdom) Colin Blackbourn & Martin Bailey	(United Kingdom) Ivor Matthews & Symon Wall
2001	(United Kingdom) Rob Bradley & Tris Winterburn/Gary Jackson & Carl Pugh		(United Kingdom) John Halsey & Jason Glenie
2002	(United Kingdom) John Halsey & Jason Glenie	(United Kingdom) Gary Jackson & Carl Pugh	(United Kingdom) Ivor Matthews & Tony Miles
2003	(United Kingdom) Rob Bradley & Tris Winterburn	(United Kingdom) John Halsey & Jason Glenie	(United Kingdom) Rob Wilson & Ian Whale
2004	(United Kingdom) Paul Whitelam & Kevin Jones	(United Kingdom) Rob Bradley & Jason Gill	(United Kingdom) Matt Fumarola & Andi Wilson
2005	(United Kingdom) Rob Wilson & Ian Whale	(United Kingdom) John Halsey & Jason Glenie	(United Kingdom) Paul Whitelam & Terry Saunters
2006	(United Kingdom) Rob Bradley & Shaun Simpson	(United Kingdom) Rob Wilson & Nicky Owen	(United Kingdom) Duncan Tolhurst & (Australia) Rob Patterson
2007	(United Kingdom) Colin Blackbourn & Paul Whitelam Jr	(United Kingdom) Steve Smith & Carl Pugh	(United Kingdom) Ivor Matthews & Tony Miles
2008	(United Kingdom) Rob Bradley & Shaun Simpson	(United Kingdom) Paul Whitelam & Alan Elliott	(United Kingdom) Rob Wilson & Terry Saunters
2009	(United Kingdom) Mark Cossar & Tom Cossar	(United Kingdom) Colin Blackbourn & Martyn Smith	(United Kingdom) Rod Winterburn & Liam Brown
2010	(United Kingdom) Mark Cossar & Carl Blyth	(United Kingdom) Rob Bradley & Shaun Simpson	(United Kingdom) Paul Whitelam & Alan Elliott
2011	(United Kingdom) Rod Winterburn & Liam Brown	(United Kingdom) Mark Cossar & Carl Blyth	(United Kingdom) Rob Bradley & Shaun Simpson
2012	(United Kingdom) Mark Cossar & Carl Blyth	(United Kingdom) Rob Bradley & Shaun Simpson	(United Kingdom) Paul Whitelam & Alan Elliott
2013	(United Kingdom) Mark Cossar & Carl Blyth	(United Kingdom) Rob Wilson & Terry Saunters	(United Kingdom) Rob Bradley & Shaun Simpson
2014	(United Kingdom) Rod Winterburn & Liam Brown	(United Kingdom) Mark Cossar & Carl Blyth	(United Kingdom) Gareth Winterburn & Billy Winterburn
2015	(United Kingdom) Colin Blackbourn & Carl Pugh	(United Kingdom) Mark Cossar & Carl Blyth	(United Kingdom) Gareth Winterburn & Billy Winterburn
2016	(United Kingdom) Rod Winterburn & Billy Winterburn	(United Kingdom) Mark Cossar & Carl Blyth	(United Kingdom) Gareth Winterburn & Liam Brown
2017	(United Kingdom) Mark Cossar & Carl Blyth	(United Kingdom) Rod Winterburn & Billy Winterburn	(United Kingdom) Gareth Winterburn & Liam Brown
2018	(United Kingdom) Gareth Winterburn & Liam Brown	(United Kingdom) Mark Cossar & Carl Blyth	(United Kingdom) Rod Winterburn & Billy Winterburn
2019	(United Kingdom) Gareth Winterburn & Liam Brown	(United Kingdom) Mark Cossar & Carl Blyth	(United Kingdom) Colin Blackbourn & Carl Pugh
2020	cancelled due to COVID		
2021	(United Kingdom) Mark Cossar & Gareth Williams	(United Kingdom) Gareth Winterburn & Liam Brown	(United Kingdom) Tom Cossar & Wayne Rickards

=== British Grasstrack Championship ===
Current ACU British Grasstrack Champions

Class	Champion
250cc Solo	Jake Mulford
350cc Solo	Paul Cooper
500cc Sidecar	Mitch Godden & Paul Smith
1000cc LH Sidecar	Alex Balman/Mark Hopkins
Pre75 250cc Solo	Phil Ranson
Pre75 350cc Solo	Chris Mackett
Pre75 500cc Solo	Ricky Scarboro
Upright 250cc Solo	Chris Mackett
Upright 350cc Solo	Luke Harris
Upright 500cc Solo	Tony Atkin

== World Championships ==
The FIM, the World's motorcycle racing authority run a World Longtrack series as well as a World Team Cup. Although both events are named 'Longtrack', they often are competed for on Grass. The World Longtrack series competitors must either qualify by finishing high enough up the standings the previous year, be selected by the FIM for a 'Wild Card', or compete in a series of qualifiers and the 'Challenge' meeting, held annually.

The World Team Cup involves each team consisting of 3 riders racing each other for points. The top team at the end is the winner.

The 1000cc Right Hand Sidecars also have their own World Championship, previously known as the 'Sidecar World Cup' and 'Sidecar Gold Cup'. The event usually takes place on speedway circuits, with Sidecar Speedway machines being mostly used.

=== World Sidecar Championship ===
Year	Venue	Winners	Second	Third
2005	(Germany) Werlte	abandoned due to weather		
2006	(United Kingdom) Isle of Wight	(Australia) Scott Christopher & Trent Koppe	(United Kingdom) Gary Jackson & Carl Blyth	(United Kingdom) Rob Wilson & Nicky Owen
2007	(Australia) Wayville	(Australia) Mick Headland & Paul Waters	(Australia) Gary Moon & Duane Dennis	(Australia) Mark Plaisted & Sam Harrison
2008	(United Kingdom) Kings Lynn	(Australia) Darrin Treloar & Justin Plaisted	(Australia) Rick House & Adam Commons	(Australia) David Bottrell & Ben Pitt
2009	(France) La Réole	(Australia) Mick Headland & Paul Waters	(Australia) Gary Moon & Josh Sinnott	(United Kingdom) Rob Wilson & Terry Saunters
2010	(United Kingdom) Coventry	(Australia) Mick Headland & Jesse Headland	(United Kingdom) Gary Jackson & Henry Rogers	(United Kingdom) Richard Moore & Rick McAuley
2011	(Australia) Murray Bridge	(Australia) Darrin Treloar & Jesse Headland	(Australia) Glenn O'Brien & Aaron Maynard	(Australia) Grant Bond & Glenn Cox
2016	(Australia) Gillman	(Australia) Darrin Treloar & Blake Cox	(Australia) Trent Headland & (United Kingdom) Daz Whetstone	(Australia) Mick Headland & Jesse Headland
2017	(Australia) Gillman	(Australia) Warren Monson & Andrew Summerhayes	(Australia) Darrin Treloar & Blake Cox	(New Zealand) Andrew Buchanan & (Australia) Denny Cox
2018	(Australia) Gillman	(Australia) Darrin Treloar & Jesse Headland	(Australia) Mark Mitchell & Tony Carter	(New Zealand) Andrew Buchanan & (Australia) Denny Cox
2019	(Australia) Gillman	(Australia) Warren Monson & Andrew Summerhayes	(Australia) Mark Plaisted & Ben Pitt	(Australia) Darrin Treloar & Blake Cox
2020	cancelled due to COVID-19 pandemic			
2021	cancelled due to COVID-19 pandemic			

== European Championships ==
FIM Europe hold European Championships for both the 500cc Solos and 500cc Sidecar classes. Qualification for both events is through one of the semi-finals, before a One Day Final, where the winner of the 'A' Final at the end of the event is crowned European Champion.

=== European Solo Championship ===
Year	Venue	First	Second	Third
1978	(United Kingdom) Hereford	(United Kingdom) Chris Baybutt	(Germany) Franz Kolbeck	(United Kingdom) Don Godden
1979	(Netherlands) Assen	(United Kingdom) Gerald Short	(Germany) Gunther Brackland	(Netherlands) Tjalle Reitsma
1980	(Germany) Bad Waldsee	(Germany) Willi Stauch	(United Kingdom) Gerald Short	(Sweden) Sture Lindblom
1981	(France) Artigues de Lussac	(United Kingdom) Neil Farnish	(United Kingdom) Bernie Leigh	(Denmark) Skjold Larsen
1982	(Belgium) Damme	(United Kingdom) Jeremy Doncaster	(United Kingdom) Mike Beaumont	(Germany) Josef Maucher
1983	(Germany) Nandlstadt	(Germany) Christian Brandt	(Germany) Eric Schafferer	(United Kingdom) Gerald Short
1984	(Netherlands) Eenrum	(United Kingdom) Martin Hagon	(Czech Republic) Vaclav Verner	(Denmark) Kent Noer
1985	(France) La Réole	(United Kingdom) Clayton Williams	(Netherlands) Harm Horstede	(Denmark) Tommy Brock
1986	(Netherlands) Eenrum	(United Kingdom) Simon Cross	(United Kingdom) Steve Schofield	(Germany) Joachim Reitzel
1987	(Germany) Nandlstadt	(Czech Republic) Roman Matoušek	(Germany) Joachim Reitzel	(United Kingdom) Bob Dolman
1988	(Netherlands) Joure	(Germany) Frank Kehlenbeck	(United Kingdom) Will James	(Denmark) Kent Noer
1989	(France) La Réole	(Germany) Robert Barth	(Denmark) Kent Noer	(United Kingdom) John Bostin
1990	(Netherlands) Uithuizen	(Germany) Robert Barth	(Denmark) Kent Noer	(Netherlands) Henk Snijder
1991	(Germany) Werlte	(Russia) Rif Saigareev	(Germany) Thomas Diehr	(United Kingdom) Trever Banks
1992	(Belgium) Alken	(Netherlands) Anne van der Helm	(Czech Republic) Vaclav Milik	(Netherlands) Paulus Ellens
1993	(Netherlands) Eenrum	(United Kingdom) Richard Musson	(Netherlands) Paulus Ellens	(Italy) Armando Dal Chiele
1994	(Germany) Cloppenburg	(Germany) Robert Barth	(Netherlands) Anne van der Helm	(United Kingdom) Steve Schofield
1995	(Netherlands) Joure	(United Kingdom) Kelvin Tatum	(Germany) Bernd Diener	(Netherlands) Anne van der Helm
1996	(France) Saint-Colomb-de-Lauzun	(Australia) Steve Johnston	(United Kingdom) Steve Schofield	(Czech Republic) Zdeněk Schneiderwind
1997	No Championship			
1998	(Germany) Schwarme	(Czech Republic) Zdeněk Schneiderwind	(Russia) Oleg Kurguskin	(Italy) Massimo Mora
1999	(Germany) Werlte	(Germany) Bernd Diener	(Czech Republic) Zdeněk Schneiderwind	(Ukraine) Vladimir Trofimov
2000	(France) Saint-Colomb-de-Lauzun	(Czech Republic) Zdeněk Schneiderwind	(Netherlands) Uppie Bos	(Germany) Enrico Janoschka
2001	(Netherlands) Noordwolde	(Netherlands) Maik Groen	(Czech Republic) Zdeněk Schneiderwind	(Netherlands) Uppie Bos
2002	(Germany) Berghaupten	(Germany) Sirg Schutzbach	(Czech Republic) Zdeněk Schneiderwind	(Netherlands) Uppie Bos
2003	(France) La Réole	(Germany) Gerd Riss	(Germany) Herbert Rudolph	(Germany) Matthias Kroger
2004	(Netherlands) Eenrum	(Netherlands) Theo Pijper	(Germany) Gerd Riss	(Germany) Bernd Diener
2005	(Germany) Schwarme	(United Kingdom) Paul Hurry	(Netherlands) Dirk Fabriek	(United Kingdom) Andrew Appleton
2006	(France) La Réole	(Germany) Stephan Katt	(Netherlands) Theo Pijper	(Netherlands) Dirk Fabriek
2007	(United Kingdom) Folkestone	(Netherlands) Theo Pijper	(Germany) Stephan Katt	(United Kingdom) Andrew Appleton
2008	(Netherlands) Siddeburen	(France) Stephane Tresarrieu	(Germany) Richard Speiser	(Finland) Rene Lehtinen
2009	(Germany) Berghaupten	(Germany) Stephan Katt	(France) Stephane Tresarrieu	(United Kingdom) Glen Phillips
2010	(France) La Réole	(United Kingdom) Andrew Appleton	(Netherlands) Theo Pijper	(Germany) Martin Smolinski
2011	(United Kingdom) Wainfleet	(Germany) Martin Smolinski	(Netherlands) Jannick de Jong	(United Kingdom) Andrew Appleton
2012	(Netherlands) Eenrum	(Germany) Stephan Katt	(Netherlands) Dirk Fabriek	(Netherlands) Jannick de Jong
2013	(Germany) Bielefeld	(Netherlands) Jannick de Jong	(Netherlands) Dirk Fabriek	(Germany) Richard Speiser
2014	(France) Saint-Macaire	(Netherlands) Jannick de Jong	(United Kingdom) David Howe	(Germany) Enrico Janoschka
2015	(Netherlands) Staphorst	(Netherlands) Jannick de Jong	(United Kingdom) James Shanes	(Germany) Stephan Katt
2016	(United Kingdom) Folkestone	(United Kingdom) James Shanes	(France) Mathieu Tresarrieu	(United Kingdom) Andrew Appleton
2017	(Germany) Hertingen	(United Kingdom) James Shanes	(United Kingdom) Andrew Appleton	(United Kingdom) Edward Kennett
2018	(France) Tayac	(France) Dimitri Berge	(Czech Republic) Josef Franc	(United Kingdom) Zach Wajtknecht
2019	(Germany) Bad Hersfeld	(United Kingdom) Zach Wajtknecht	(United Kingdom) Paul Hurry	(Denmark) Kenneth Hansen
2020	(France) Tayac	(France) Mathieu Tresarrieu	(Netherlands) Romano Hummel	(Netherlands) Dave Meijerink
2021	(United Kingdom) Leamington Spa	cancelled due to COVID-19 pandemic		
2022	(United Kingdom) Leamington Spa	due to take place on 7 August 2022		

=== European Sidecar Championship ===
Year	Venue	First	Second	Third
1980	(Germany) Melsungen	(Germany) Otto Bauer & Peter Stiegelbrunner	(Germany) Egon Waller & Edgar Starke	(Germany) Michael Datzmann & Rosamunde Datzmann
1981	(Netherlands) Assen	(Germany) Michael Datzmann & Rosamunde Datzmann	(Germany) Heinz Pagel & Hans Werner Kempa	(Germany) Otto Bauer & Peter Stiegelbrunner
1982	(Germany) Schwarme	(Germany) Michael Datzmann & Rosamunde Datzmann	(Germany) Heinz Pagel & Jurgen Zaddach	(Germany) Rudolf Meyer & Diter Held
1983	(Netherlands) Assen	(Germany) Michael Datzmann & Rosamunde Datzmann	(Germany) Michael Lippmann & Willi Ganss	(Germany) Heinz Pagel & Jurgen Zaddach
1984	(Germany) Berghaupten	(Germany) Michael Datzmann & Rosamunde Datzmann	(Germany) Heinz Pagel & Jurgen Zaddach	(Germany) Ulrich Wehrle & Stefan Rufat
1985	(Netherlands) Kuinre	(Germany) Heinz Pagel & Jurgen Zaddach	(Germany) Ewald Heim & Robert Heim	(Germany) Karl Keil & Joachim Reeg
1986	(Germany) Bad Waldsee	(Germany) Josef Onderka & Franz Onderka	(Germany) Karl Keil & Reiner Ganster	(Germany) Heinz Pagel & Herbert Bucker
1987	(France) Valence	(Germany) Josef Onderka & Franz Onderka	(Switzerland) Hans Bolliger & Bernhard Gloor	(Germany) Karl Keil & Reiner Ganster
1988	(Germany) Celle	(Germany) Karl Keil & Joachim Reeg	(Germany) Josef Onderka & Franz Onderka	(Netherlands) Marco Glorie & Erik van Dijk
1989	(Germany) Berghaupten	(Germany) Josef Onderka & Josef Feigl	(Switzerland) Hans Bolliger & Bernhard Gloor	(Germany) Karl Keil & Joachim Reeg
1990	(Germany) Haunstetten	(Germany) Josef Onderka & Robert Wolf	(Germany) Karl Keil & Joachim Reeg	(Germany) Bernd Soger & Heinz Brandt
1991	(Netherlands) Eenrum	(Germany) Josef Onderka & Robert Wolf	(Germany) Karl Keil & Joachim Reeg	(Germany) Eward Heim & Robert Heim
1992	(Germany) Berghaupten	(Germany) Josef Onderka & Walter Huber	(Germany) Thomas Kunert & Josef Feigl	(France) Laurent Sambarrey & Lionel Sambarrey
1993	(Germany) Harsewinkel	(Germany) Karl Keil & Joachim Reeg	(Germany) Josef Onderka & Josef Feigl	(Netherlands) Marco Glorie & Harry Drenth
1994	(Netherlands) Lattrop	(Netherlands) Marco Glorie & Harry Drenth	(Germany) Karl Keil & Joachim Reeg	(Germany) Eward Heim & Robert Heim
1995	(Germany) Melsungen	(Germany) Thomas Kunert & Wolfgang Maier	(Germany) Peter Murmann & Stefan Muller	(Netherlands) Marco Glorie & Harry Drenth
1996	(Netherlands) Eenrum	(Germany) Thomas Kunert & Marco Hundsrucker	(Germany) Josef Onderka & Uwe Kuhberger	(France) Jacues Leduc & Michel Gorget
1997	(Germany) Melsungen	(Germany) Josef Onderka & Uwe Kuhberger	(Germany) Thomas Kunert & Marco Hundsrucker	(Germany) Oswald Bischoff & Mario Siebert
1998	(France) Morizès	(Germany) Josef Onderka & Uwe Kuhberger	(Germany) Thomas Kunert & Hermann Bacher	(Germany) Oswald Bischoff & Mario Siebert
1999	(Germany) Vechta	(Germany) Thomas Kunert & Hermann Bacher	(Germany) Josef Onderka & Uwe Kuhberger	(Germany) Oswald Bischoff & Mario Siebert
2000	(Netherlands) Lattrop	(Germany) Josef Onderka & Martin Wamprechtshammer	(Germany) Thomas Kunert & Hermann Bacher	(Netherlands) Marco Glorie & Harry Drenth
2001	(Germany) Melsungen	(Germany) Thomas Kunert & Marco Hundsrucker	(Germany) Oswald Bischoff & Mario Siebert	(Netherlands) Marco Glorie & Harry Drenth
2002	(Netherlands) Siddeburen	(Germany) Josef Onderka & Martin Wamprechtshammer	(Netherlands) William Matthijsen & Erwin Boers	(Germany) Thomas Kunert & Markus Eibl
2003	(Germany) Angenrod	(Germany) Thomas Kunert & Hermann Bacher	(Germany) Oswald Bischoff & Rainer Falter	(Netherlands) William Matthijsen & Erwin Boers
2004	(United Kingdom) High Easter	(Germany) Thomas Kunert & Bernd Kreuzer	(Netherlands) Tjeerd Hoekstra & Henk Auwema	(Netherlands) William Matthijsen & Nathalie Matthijssen
2005	(Netherlands) Siddeburen	(Netherlands) Sven Holstein & Desiree Daubert	(Netherlands) William Matthijsen & Nathalie Matthijssen	(Netherlands) Mark Detz & Gerald Eelding
2006	(Germany) Melsungen	(Germany) Thomas Kunert & Bernd Kreuzer	(Germany) Markus Brandhofer & Helmut Beller	(Germany) Karl Keil & Berit Tralau
2007	(Netherlands) Eenrum	(Netherlands) William Matthijsen & Nathalie Matthijssen	(Germany) Markus Venus & Florian Niedermeier	(Netherlands) Sven Holstein & Desiree Daubert
2008	(Germany) Bielefeld	(Germany) Thomas Kunert & Markus Eibl	(Netherlands) William Matthijsen & Nathalie Matthijssen	(Germany) Stefan Brandhofer & Marco Hundsrucker
2009	(United Kingdom) Wimborne	(Netherlands) William Matthijsen & Nathalie Matthijssen	(Germany) Thomas Kunert & Markus Eibl	(Netherlands) Markus Brandhofer & Corinna Gunthor
2010	(Germany) Uithuizen	(Germany) Thomas Kunert & Markus Eibl	(Netherlands) William Matthijssen & Sandra Mollema	(Netherlands) Sven Holstein & (United Kingdom) Anthony Goodwin
2011	(Netherlands) Noordwolde	(Netherlands) William Matthijssen & Nathalie Matthijssen	(Netherlands) Mark Detz & Bonita van Dijk	(Germany) Stefan Brandhofer & Daniel Eibl
2012	(Germany) Werlte	(Germany) Thomas Kunert & Markus Eibl	(Germany) Markus Venus & Markus Heiss	(Germany) Stefan Brandhofer & Daniel Eibl
2013	(Netherlands) Loppersum	(Germany) Thomas Kunert & Markus Eibl	(Netherlands) William Matthijssen & Nathalie Stellingwerf	(France) Christophe Grenier & (Netherlands) Gerben Sanders
2014	(United Kingdom) High Easter	(United Kingdom) Josh Goodwin & Liam Brown	(United Kingdom) Nick Radley & Abi Radley	(Germany) Markus Venus & Markus Heiss
2015	(Germany) Hertingen	cancelled due to accident during practice		
2016	(Netherlands) Vries	(Netherlands) William Matthijssen & Sandra Mollema	(Germany) Markus Venus & Markus Heiss	(Germany) Markus Brandhofer & Michael Zapf
2017	(France) Tayac	(Netherlands) William Matthijssen & Sandra Mollema	(Germany) Markus Brandhofer & Tim Scheunemann	(Germany) Markus Venus & Markus Heiss
2018	(Germany) Wertle	(Netherlands) William Matthijssen & Sandra Mollema	(England) Mitch Godden & Paul Smith	(Germany) Markus Venus & Markus Heiss
2019	(Netherlands) Eenrum	(Netherlands) William Matthijssen & Sandra Mollema	(Germany) Markus Venus & Markus Heis	(England) Mitch Godden & Paul Smith
2020	cancelled due to COVID-19 pandemic			
2021	cancelled due to COVID-19 pandemic			

== National Championships ==
A number of countries, where the sport of Grasstrack, and Longtrack, are popular, hold National Championships for a number of different classes. In Great Britain, the 500cc Solos and 1000cc Sidecars have their own Championship, whereas the 250cc, 350cc Solos and 500cc & 1000cc Left-Handed Sidecar champions are decided in a separate event. Other classes, such as Youth and Vintage machines also have their own championships.

Some of the more prestigious National Championships include:

(France) French Grasstrack Championship
(United Kingdom) British Masters
(United Kingdom) British Grasstrack Championships
(Netherlands) Dutch Grasstrack Solo Championship
(Netherlands) Dutch Grasstrack Sidecar Championship

A number of these countries also hold a National Longtrack Championship

== See also ==
- Longtrack
- Sidecar speedway
- Speedway
