= Philippe Bergé =

French motorcycle racer

- Born: 20 June 1971 (age 55); Brive-la-Gaillarde, France
- Nationality: French

Career history
- 1996–1997: Oxford Cheetahs
- 1998–2000: Isle of Wight Islanders
- 1998: Peterborough Panthers
- 1998: Swindon Robins

Individual honours
- 1996: French Champion

Team honours
- 1998: tier 2 league champions
- 1998: Premier League Four-Team Championship

Philippe Bergé (born 20 June 1971 in Brive-la-Gaillarde) is a French former motorcycle speedway rider, who competed in Grasstrack, Longtrack and Speedway. He is a former champion of France and earned three caps for the France national speedway team.

== Speedway career ==
Bergé came to prominence when he reached the final of the 1993 Individual Long Track World Championship, he then reached a second longtrack final the following year. He began his British league career riding for Oxford Cheetahs during the 1996 Premier League speedway season, he was signed midway through the season but still rode 14 times for the club.

In 1996, Bergé became the champion of France and competed in his third world longtrack final at the 1996 Individual Long Track World Championship and showed enough good form during 1996 to be retained by the Cheetahs for the 1997 Premier League speedway season, where he rode 35 times and averaged above 8 and recorded a maximum score in the second leg of the Premier League Knockout Cup final. He also finished in seventh place during the 1997 Individual Long Track World Championship.

Bergé left Oxford for the Isle of Wight Islanders following Oxford's move to the Elite League and also rode a few matches for Swindon Robins before switching to Peterborough Panthers, who he helped win the league and reach the Knockout Cup final. He was also part of the Peterborough four that won the Premier League Four-Team Championship, which was held on 30 August 1998, at the East of England Arena.

Bergé competed in the 1998 Individual Long Track World Championship and reached his third European Grasstrack final in 1999.

== Major results ==
=== World Individual Longtrack Championship ===
- 1993 Individual Long Track World Championship 18th, 2pts
- 1995 Individual Long Track World Championship 12th, 5pts
- 1996 Individual Long Track World Championship 11th, 6pts
- 1997 Individual Long Track World Championship 7th, 64pts
- 1998 Individual Long Track World Championship 21st, 11pts

== Family ==
His son Dimitri Bergé is also an international speedway rider.
