= 1984 British Speedway Championship =

Seasons
- ← 1983 1985 →

The 1984 British Speedway Championship was the 24th edition of the British Speedway Championship. The Final took place on 20 June at Brandon in Coventry, England. The Championship was won by Kenny Carter, with Andy Grahame edging out Dave Jessup for second place.

== Final ==
- 20 June 1984
- (England) Brandon Stadium, Coventry

Placing	Rider	Total	1	2	3	4	5	6	7	8	9	10	11	12	13	14	15	16	17	18	19	20	Pts	Pos	21
1	(England) (5) Kenny Carter	13		3			3					1					3					3	13	1	
2	(England) (10) Andy Grahame	12			3			2						3			1		3				12	2	
3	(England) (15) Dave Jessup	11				2			3			2						2	2				11	3	
4	(England) (4) Les Collins	10	2							3				1				3				1	10	4	
5	(England) (2) Martin Yeates	10	1					3				3				1				2			10	5	
6	(England) (1) Alan Grahame	9	3				3				0				3				T				9	6	
7	(England) (3) Simon Wigg	8	E						0				3				2				3		8	7	
8	(England) (7) Jeremy Doncaster	8		0					2					2	1					3			8	8	
9	(England) (14) Peter Collins	7				1		1					1		2							2	7	9	3
10	(England) (16) Neil Evitts	7				3				2	2						0			0			7	10	2
11	(England) (11) Gordon Kennett	6			2				1		1					2						0	6	11	
12	(England) (9) Chris Morton	5			E		1						2					1		1			5	12	
13	(England) (13) John Louis	4				X	2							0		0					2		4	13	
14	(England) (8) Phil Collins	3		X						0			E			3			E				3	14	
15	(England) (12) John Davis	3			1					1		0			0						1		3	15	
16	(England) (6) Mark Courtney	2		2				0			0							0			0		2	16	
R1	(England) (R1) Kevin Hawkins	1																	1				1	R1	
Placing	Rider	Total	1	2	3	4	5	6	7	8	9	10	11	12	13	14	15	16	17	18	19	20	Pts	Pos	21

m - exclusion for exceeding two minute time allowance • t - exclusion for touching the tapes • x - other exclusion • e - retired or mechanical failure • f - fell • ns - non-starter • nc - non-classify

gate A - inside	gate B	gate C	gate D - outside

== British Under 21 final ==
Marvyn Cox won the British Speedway Under 21 Championship. The final was held at Kingsmead Stadium on 2 June.

Pos.	Rider	Points
1	Marvyn Cox	13+3
2	Simon Cross	13+2
3	Andy Smith	12+3
4	Alun Rossiter	12+2
5	Kelvin Smart	11
6	Steve Bishop	9
7	Dave Mullett	9
8	Carl Blackbird	7
9	Paul Clarke	6
10	David Smart	6
11	Jamie Luckhurst	5
12	Carl Baldwin	5
13	Guy Wilson	4
14	Andy Galvin	3
15	Julian Parr	2
16	Paul Price	2

== See also ==
- British Speedway Championship
- 1984 Individual Speedway World Championship
