= 1986 Individual Long Track World Championship =

Long track motorcycle racing event

The 1986 Individual Long Track World Championship was the 16th edition of the FIM speedway Individual Long Track World Championship. The event was held on 14 September 1986 in Pfarrkirchen, Germany, which was West Germany at the time.

The world title was won by Erik Gundersen of Denmark for the second time.

== Final Classification ==
Pos	Rider	Heat Pts	Heat Pts	Heat Pts	Heat Pts	Heat Pts	Total Pts
1	(Denmark) Erik Gundersen	5	5	5	5	5	25
2	(England) Peter Collins	4	4	3	3	4	18
3	(Switzerland) Marcel Gerhard	2	5	5	3	3	18
4	(West Germany) Gerd Riss	4	4	4	5	ef	17
5	(Denmark) Hans Nielsen	5	x	5	4	ef	14
6	(West Germany) Karl Maier	4	3	4	ef	ef	11
7	(West Germany) Bernd Diener	ef	5	1	4	E	10
8	(Finland) Kai Niemi	1	4	3	2	E	10
9	(Czechoslovakia) Petr Vandirek	3	2	3	1	E	9
10	(United States) Shawn Moran	5	3	ef	ef	E	8
11	(West Germany) Hans Otto Pingel	1	3	2	2	E	8
12	(Czechoslovakia) Emil Sova	3	2	2	1	E	8
13	(England) Phil Collins	2	2	1	E	E	5
14	(Czechoslovakia) Pavel Karnas	3	1	0	E	E	4
15	(Sweden) Roland Dannö	0	0	4	E	E	4
16	(West Germany) Heinrich Diener	2	1	1	E	E	4
17	(England) Trevor Banks	1	0	2	E	E	3
18	(West Germany) Alois Wiesböck	0	ef	ef	E	E	0

- E = eliminated (no further ride)
- f = fell
- ef = engine failure
- x = excluded
