= Nandlstadt =

- Municipality
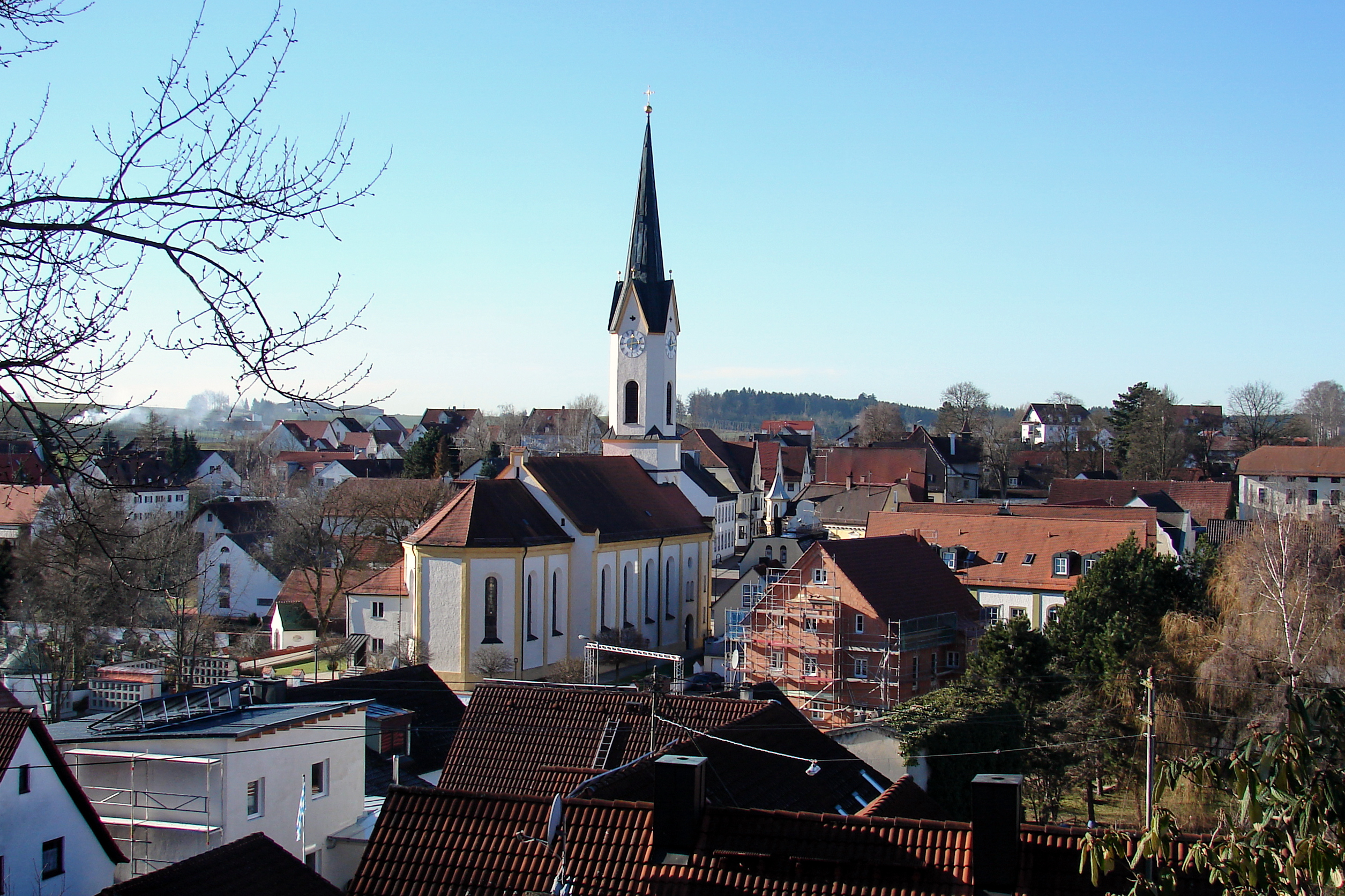
- Church of Saint Martin

- Coat of arms

- Location of Nandlstadt within Freising district
- Interactive map of Nandlstadt
- Location within Germany Location within Bavaria
- Coordinates: 48°32′N 11°48′E
- Country: Germany
- State: Bavaria
- Admin. region: Oberbayern
- District: Freising

Government
  - Mayor (2020–26): Gerhard Betz

Area
  - Total: 34.3 km^{2} (13.2 sq mi)
- Elevation: 465 m (1,526 ft)

Population (2025-12-31)
  - Total: 5,617
  - Density: 164/km^{2} (424/sq mi)
- Time zone: UTC+01:00 (CET)
  - Summer (DST): UTC+02:00 (CEST)
- Postal codes: 85405
- Dialling codes: 08756
- Vehicle registration: FS
- Website: www.markt-nandlstadt.de

Nandlstadt (German pronunciation: [ˈnandl̩ˌʃtat]) is a municipality in the district of Freising in Bavaria in Germany. Nandlstadt is said to be the oldest hop-growing area in the world, having grown them since the year 860. The town lies in a triangle between Freising, Moosburg and Mainburg.
