= Sandbahn Rennen Herxheim =

Speedway stadium in Herxheim bei Landau/Pfalz, Germany

- Interactive map of Sandbahn Rennen Herxheim
- Location: St.-Christophorus-Straße 14, 76863 Herxheim bei Landau/Pfalz, Germany
- Coordinates: 49°08′06″N 8°13′16″E

Sandbahn Rennen Herxheim or Waldstadion is a Longtrack and motorcycle speedway stadium in Herxheim bei Landau/Pfalz, Germany. The stadium is located south of the municipality, on the St.-Christophorus-Straße 14, in a forested area. The Motorsportvereinigung Herxheim use the facility.

== History ==
The site is best known for longtrack and has been a major venue for the longer form of speedway. It hosted the final of the Individual Speedway Long Track World Championship in 1984, 1990 and 1996. Since the introduction of the Grand Prix series in 1997, the track has been selected multiple times to hold a round of the series. The most recent being 2024.

The track occasionally holds conventional speedway and was chosen to hold the qualifying round of the 2012 Speedway World Cup.

The speedway team MSV Herxheim (nicknamed the Drifters) also raced conventional speedway, participating in the German Team Speedway Championship during 2012.

In 2024, the venue will hold the European Under-19 Individual Speedway Championship final.
