= Schwarme =

- Municipality
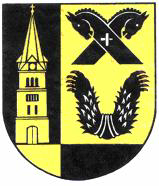
- Coat of arms

- Location of Schwarme within Diepholz district
- Interactive map of Schwarme
- Location within Germany Location within Lower Saxony
- Coordinates: 52°54′N 9°1′E
- Country: Germany
- State: Lower Saxony
- District: Diepholz
- Municipal assoc.: Bruchhausen-Vilsen

Government
  - Mayor: Johann-Dieter Oldenburg

Area
  - Total: 24.31 km^{2} (9.39 sq mi)
- Elevation: 11 m (36 ft)

Population (2025-12-31)
  - Total: 2,663
  - Density: 109.5/km^{2} (283.7/sq mi)
- Time zone: UTC+01:00 (CET)
  - Summer (DST): UTC+02:00 (CEST)
- Postal codes: 27327
- Dialling codes: 04258
- Vehicle registration: DH
- Website: www.schwarme.de

Schwarme (German pronunciation: [ˈʃvaʁmə]; Low German: Swarm) is a municipality in the district of Diepholz, in Lower Saxony, Germany. The municipality Schwarme is located in the Mittelweserregion around 30 km south of Bremen. The towns Achim, Verden and Bruchhausen-Vilsen are about 15 km from Schwarme.
