= Klaus Lausch =

German speedway rider

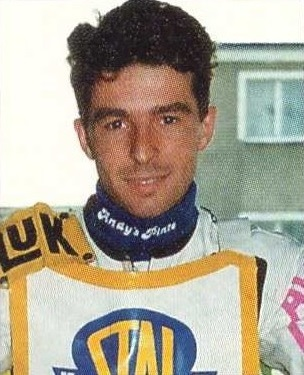
- Klaus Lausch in Stal Gorzów colours, 1992
- Born: 19 February 1964 (age 62); Wasserburg, West Germany
- Nationality: German

Career history

Germany
- 1982–1984, 1986: Landshut
- 1988, 1990–1992: Diedenbergen

Great Britain
- 1984–1985: Oxford Cheetahs

Poland
- 1991: Gorzów

Individual honours
- 1988: World longtrack silver medal
- 1988, 1989, 1990: German Individual Championship
- 1986: West German Longtrack champion

Team honours
- 1982, 1984, 1986: West German team title
- 1985: British League champion
- 1985: Knockout Cup
- 1985: Midland Cup

Klaus Lausch (born 19 February 1964) is a German former motorcycle rider. He competed in speedway and longtrack racing. He reached seven World Longtrack world championship finals and earned 27 international caps for the West German national speedway team and two caps for the German national speedway team.

== Career ==
Lausch began his career at AC Landshut and reached the final of the 1982 European U21 Championship. Lausch helped Landshut win two West German Team Championships in 1982 and 1984 respectively.

Oxford Cheetahs had returned to the British League in 1984 and had signed Hans Nielsen for a record £30,000, Simon Wigg for £25,000, Marvyn Cox, Melvyn Taylor and Jens Rasmussen. Following an injury to Taylor, the Cheetahs moved to sign Lausch as a replacement and his career took off afterwards. The following season in 1985, he was part of the Oxford team that won the treble of league, Knockout Cup and Midland Cup despite breaking his collarbone during the season.

After returning to Germany in 1986, Lausch won another West German title and surprisingly made the decision not to return to British speedway, despite a demand from British clubs existing. He won his first German Individual Championship in 1988.

Lausch secured three consecutive German titles by winning both the 1989 and 1990 editions of the championship. He joined MSC Diedenbergen in 1990 and had a season in Poland riding for Stal Gorzów Wielkopolski in 1991.

Alongside conventional speedway, Lausch was successful in longtrack and would reach seven world finals, including winning a silver medal in 1988. Additionally, he won the 1986 West German Longtrack Championship.

== World Longtrack Championship ==
=== Final ===
- 1985 (Denmark) Esbjerg (11th) 6pts
- 1987 (Czechoslovakia) Mühldorf (14th) 5pts
- 1988 (West Germany) Scheeßel (2nd) 32pts
- 1989 (Czechoslovakia) Mariánské Lázně (17th) 1pt
- 1990 (Germany) Herxheim (5th) 28pts
- 1991 (Czech Republic) Mariánské Lázně (11th) 7pts
- 1992 (Germany) Pfarrkirchen (8th) 10pts

== World Final appearances ==
=== World Pairs Championship ===
- 1986 - (West Germany) Pocking, Rottalstadion (with Karl Maier) - 6th - 27pts (5)
- 1990 - (West Germany) Landshut, Ellermühle Stadium (with Gerd Riss) - 9th - 15pts (15)
- 1991 - (Poland) Poznań, Olimpia Poznań Stadium (with Gerd Riss - 4th - 18pts (9)

== German Individual Speedway Championship ==
- 1988 (Germany) Brokstedt (Champion) 14pts (After run off with Tommy Dunker).
- 1989 (Germany) Norden (Champion) 15pts
- 1990 (Germany) Neustadt (Champion) 15pts
