= Steve Schofield (speedway rider) =

British motorcycle speedway rider

- Born: 27 February 1958 (age 68); Carshalton, England
- Nationality: British (English)

Career history

Great Britain
- 1980–1983: Weymouth Wildcats
- 1982–1983: Reading Racers
- 1984–1985: Wolverhampton Wolves
- 1986–1988, 1991–1997: Poole Wildcats/Pirates
- 1986: Coventry Bees
- 1989–1990: Hackney Kestrels
- 1998: Oxford Cheetahs

Poland
- 1992–1996: Gdańsk

Individual honours
- 1997: Long Track World Championship silver
- 1998: Long Track World Championship bronze
- 1990: Southern Riders' Champion
- 1988: British Masters (Grasstrack)

Team honours
- 1994: League champion (tier 1)
- 1994: Fours winner (tier 1)
- 1986: National League Riders' runner-up (tier 2)
- 1990: Pairs champion (tier 2)

Steven Schofield (born 27 February 1958) is a British former motorcycle speedway rider. He competed in speedway, longtrack and grasstrack Racing. He earned 12 international caps for the England national speedway team.

== Career ==
=== Longtrack and grasstrack ===
Schofield reached eight World Longtrack world championship finals and won the silver medal in 1997 and the bronze medal in 1998. He also reached seven European Grasstrack Champion finals and was the British Masters 500cc grasstrack champion in 1988, following seven consecutive 350cc titles from 1980 to 1986.

=== Speedway ===
Schofield began his British leagues career riding for Weymouth Wildcats in 1980 but it was not until the 1981 National League season that he became a first team regular. He enjoyed two more seasons of consistent riding at Weymouth recording an average of 8.97 in 1983.

Schofield spent two seasons at Wolverhampton Wolves from 1984 to 1985 before joining Poole Wildcats in 1986. In his first season at Poole he finished runner-up in the National League Riders' Championship and averaged 10.36. He topped the Poole averages for the next two years in 1987 and 1988.

For the 1989 National League season, SchofieldÀ joined Hackney Kestrels and topped the league averages for the London club. The following season, the success continued as he topped the league averages for a second consecutive season and won the National League Pairs, partnering Andy Galvin for Hackney, during the 1990 National League season. In 1990, he won the Southern Riders' Championship.

After two very successful seasons with Hackney, Schofield re-joined the Poole Pirates, where he would spend seven more seasons. With Poole, he won the 1994 league title and fours championship. His final season was the 1998 Elite League speedway season, with Oxford Cheetahs.

Schofield retired through injury having been involved in a bad crash with Jason Crump and Joe Screen at the Bonfire Burn-up.

== Major results ==
=== World Longtrack Championship ===
- 1987 Semi-final
- 1988 (West Germany) Scheeßel (14th) 6pts
- 1989 (Czechoslovakia) Mariánské Lázně (12th) 12pts
- 1990 (Germany) Herxheim bei Landau/Pfalz (13th) 9pts
- 1991 (Czechoslovakia) Mariánské Lázně (13th) 5pts
- 1992 (Germany) Pfarrkirchen (15th) 2pts
- 1993 (Germany) Mühldorf (5th) 14pts
- 1994 Semi-final
- 1995 (Germany) Scheeßel (19th) 1pt
- 1996 (Germany) Herxheim bei Landau/Pfalz (8th) 8pts
- 1997 5 app (Second) 85pts
- 1998 5 app (Third) 85pts
- 1999 5 app (Fourth) 76pts

=== Best Grand-Prix Results ===
- (England) Abingdon-on-Thames - third 1998
- (Germany) Cloppenburg - first 1997
- (Germany) Jübek - third 1999
- (Czech Republic) Mariánské Lázně - first 1997
- (France) Marmande - second 1998, third 1999
- (Germany) Mühldorf - third 1998 & 1999

=== European Grasstrack Championship ===
- 1981 Semi-final
- 1982 (Belgium) Damme (5th) 15pts
- 1985 (France) La Réole (7th) 11pts
- 1986 (Netherlands) Eenrum (second) 21pts
- 1994 (Germany) Cloppenburg (third) 19pts
- 1995 (Netherlands) Joure (8th) 11pts
- 1996 (France) Saint-Colomb-de-Lauzun (second) 21pts

=== British Grasstrack Championship ===
500cc Finals

- 1982 second
- 1983 third
- 1988 first
- 1992 second
- 1994 second
- 1996 second
