= Herxheim bei Landau/Pfalz =

- Municipality
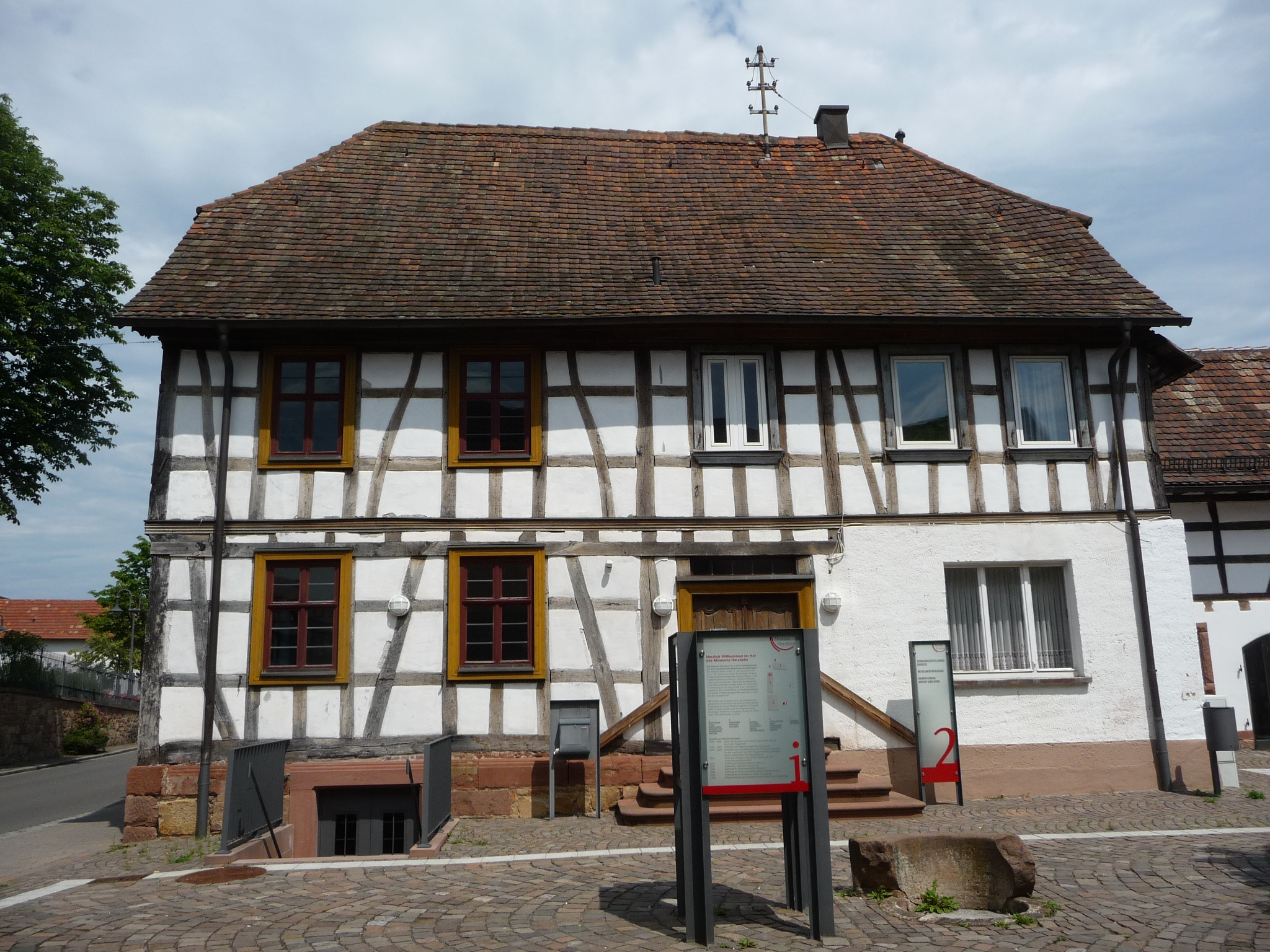
- Museum Herxheim

- Coat of arms

- Location of Herxheim bei Landau/Pfalz within Südliche Weinstraße district
- Interactive map of Herxheim bei Landau/Pfalz
- Location within Germany Location within Rhineland-Palatinate
- Coordinates: 49°08′49″N 8°13′12″E
- Country: Germany
- State: Rhineland-Palatinate
- District: Südliche Weinstraße
- Municipal assoc.: Herxheim

Government
  - Mayor (2019–24): Hedi Braun (Ind.)

Area
  - Total: 29.13 km^{2} (11.25 sq mi)
- Elevation: 129 m (423 ft)

Population (2025-12-31)
  - Total: 11,041
  - Density: 379.0/km^{2} (981.7/sq mi)
- Time zone: UTC+01:00 (CET)
  - Summer (DST): UTC+02:00 (CEST)
- Postal codes: 76863
- Dialling codes: 07276
- Vehicle registration: SÜW
- Website: www.herxheim-pfalz.de

Herxheim bei Landau/Pfalz (lit. 'Herxheim near Landau/Pfalz'), commonly known as Herxheim (German pronunciation: [ˈhɛʁksˌhaɪm]), is a municipality in the Südliche Weinstraße district, in Rhineland-Palatinate, Germany. It is situated approximately 10 km (6.2 mi) south-east of Landau. Herxheim is the seat of the Verbandsgemeinde ("collective municipality") Herxheim.

== History ==
The first European farmers cleared the forests in the present-day Herxheim region around 7,000 years ago during the Neolithic and established a settlement. The settlement was originally enclosed by a double ring of elongated pits. Archaeological excavations have uncovered evidence of large-scale ritual violence and cannibalism involving more than a thousand individuals.

The Alemanni first settled the area in the third century followed by Franconian settlers in the sixth century. The Franks often named their new home after their leader so it is assumed a Franconian leader name Hari or Heri who settled here with his clan. In 773, a document found in the Weißenburg monastery refers to the location as "Harieschaim."

In 1057, the Holy Roman Emperor Henry IV donated the land so that Herxheim would come under the rule of the Speyer Monastery.

After the Treaties of Nijmegen in 1678/79, Herxheim and all the communities south of the Queich fell to the Sun King Louis XIV of France. Thus Herxheim was part of the French state of Bas-Rhin until 1815.

After Napoleon's second defeat in 1815, the Second Treaty of Paris reassigned the areas north of the Lauter to the Kingdom of Bavaria.

After World War II, Herxheim became part of the newly formed state of Rhineland-Palatinate within the French occupation zone, thus ending the Bavarian era.

Herxheim was included in a new district known as Landau-Bad Bergzabern which was formed in 1969 by merging the districts Landau and Bergzabern. In 1978, Landau-Bad Bergzabern was renamed to Südliche Weinstraße. The district is named after the first touristic route built in Germany in the 1930s, the German Wine Route (Deutsche Weinstraße).

== Festivities ==
=== Laurentiusbrotweihe (Day of St Lawrence Bread Consecration) ===
In 1666, the plague swept through Herxheim and killed many of its residents. Herxheim was quarantined and as a result supplies of food ran out so many residents also died of hunger. Herxheim received unprecedented help from the neighboring communities in the north and north-east, especially from Ottersheim. At the quarantine border in the "Finsterfeld" pit, neighboring residents left baskets full of baked bread and other food where the Herxheimers could pick them up. This charitable act saved the lives of many Herxheimers.

The Herxheimers begged God for salvation from distress and promised to bring the helpful neighbors consecrated bread every year. After the end of the epidemic, the people of Herxheim kept their promise. They brought bread to the neighboring communities every year and called it Laurentiusbrot. This is based on Saint Lawrence who gave bread to the poor in Rome in the 3rd century.

Today, the feast day is still celebrated on the Sunday after the name day of St. Lawrence (10 August). A bread cart is set early in the morning and fills up with donated bread in the course of the morning. The pastor consecrates the Laurentius bread. At 12 o'clock a fully laden carriage, pulled by two horses, starts moving to the sound of the big bell. Pastors, altar boys and hundreds of Herxheimers follow the car out into the "Finsterfeld" pit.

== Coat of arms ==
Herxheim coat of arms

Blazon: A shield divided by silver and blue, a heraldic fleur-de-lis with mixed colors, the upper end accompanied by two gold stars.

Approval: 23 February 1923 by the Bavarian State Ministry of the Interior, Munich (Bayerisches Staatsministerium des Innern, München)

Origin/meaning: The fleur-de-lis and the stars in the arms are symbols of the Virgin Mary. Herxheim became a property of the Monastery of Speyer in 1057. The patron saint of Speyer, as well as Herxheim's town's church, is St. Mary. The fleur-de-lis was also the symbol used on the seals of Herxheim, which are known since the 17th century. The silver and blue colors used were based on the colors of the Speyer cathedral chapter and those of the Holzapfel von Herxheim family who lived in the cathedral. The first document in which the Herxheim court seal with the lily and seven stars or a crown with seven pearls appears dates from 1733.

== Sights ==
=== Waldstadion ===
The Sandbahn Rennen Herxheim or Waldstadion is a multi-purpose facility for horse racing, motorcycle racing and football.

The venue hosts domestic and international motorcycle speedway and has hosted the World Longtrack Championship Final three occasions and in recent years has held a number of rounds of the Grand-Prix series.

=== Museum Herxheim ===
The Herxheim Museum is the first in Germany to have its archaeological department entirely dedicated to the first peasant culture in Central Europe, the linear pottery culture - the ceramics in the oldest part of the Neolithic. The museum also showcases the history of the tobacco industry in Herxheim.

=== Parish church of St. Mary of the Assumption ===
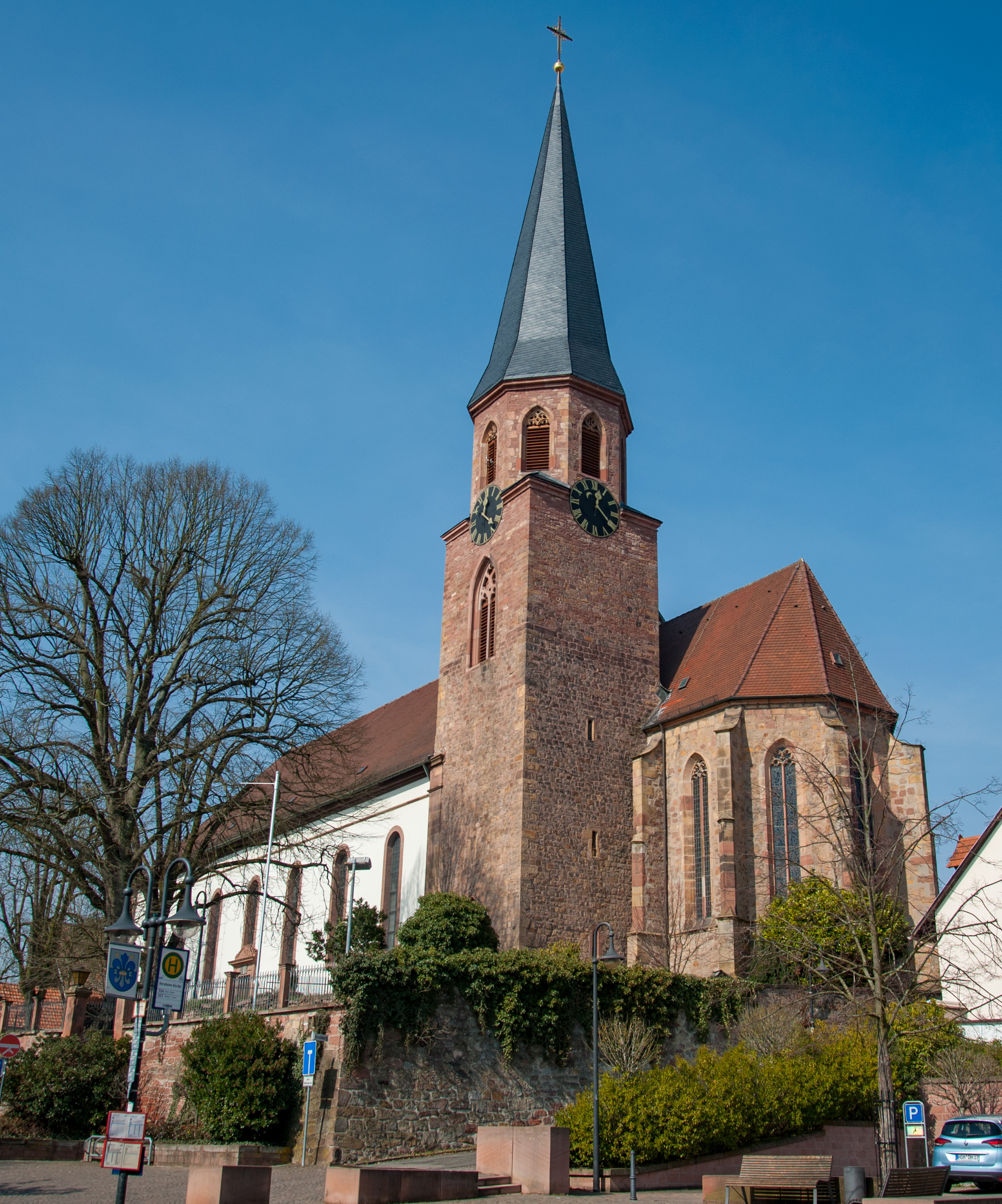
St Maria Himmelfahrt in Herxheim bei Landau/Pfalz

The Catholic parish church of St Mary of the Assumption (German = St. Maria Himmelfahrt) is located in center of Herxheim and has an unmistakable position in the town due to its central and elevated location. The church is consecrated in honor of the Assumption of Mary. The first documented mention of a church in Herxheim came from Conrad III of Scharfenberg in 1213. However, new research suggests there was probably a church in the same place in 773, even before the place came under episcopal rule.

Over the centuries, the church has been redesigned and enlarged several times, so that today it combines several architectural styles. The late Gothic choir, built in 1507, including the church tower from 1585 and the hall-like nave in the late Baroque style are noteworthy.

== International relations ==
Herxheim is twinned with:

- Ilfracombe, England
- St. Apollinaire, France
