= Karl Maier (speedway rider) =

German speedway rider

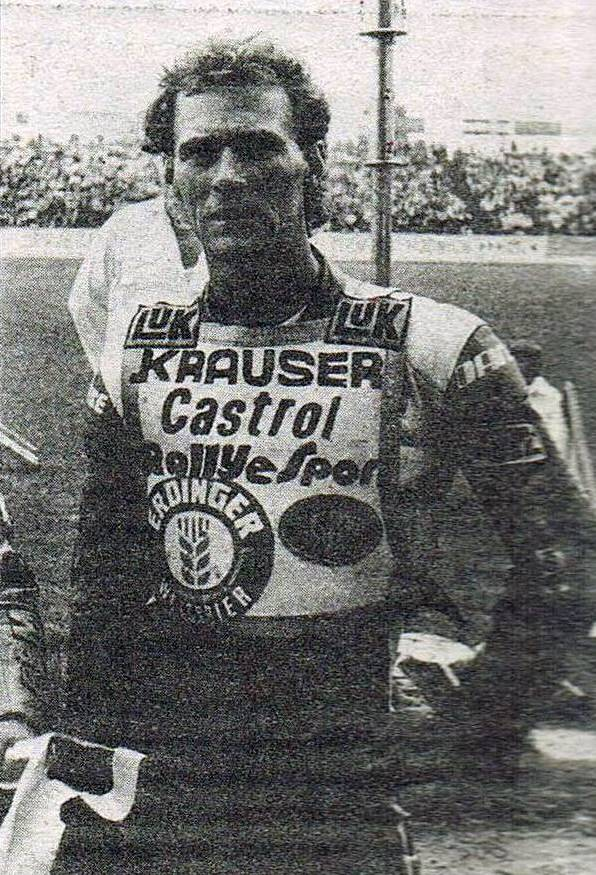
- Karl Maier in 1992
- Born: 24 August 1957 (age 69); Munich, West Germany
- Nationality: German

Career history

West Germany
- 1978: Landshut
- 1980: Olching

Great Britain
- 1979: Belle Vue Aces
- 1982–1983: Birmingham Brummies

Individual honours
- 1980, 1982, 1987, 1988: Long Track World Champion
- 1992, 1993: German Longtrack champion
- 1979, 1980, 1983, 1987, 1989, 1990: West German Longtrack champion

Karl Maier (born 24 August 1957) is a German former speedway rider. He competed in motorcycle speedway and Longtrack racing. He reached seventeen world longtrack championship finals and was world champion four times. He also earned 38 international caps for the West German national speedway team.

== Career ==
Maier began his career in 1975 and soon established himself as one of the world's leading longtrack riders. He was crowned world longtrack champion for the first time after winning the 1980 Individual Long Track World Championship in Scheeßel, defeating Egon Müller into second place and taking Müller's place as Germany's longtrack hero.

Maier would go on to become long track world champion four times, earning further wins in 1982, 1987 and 1988. In addition, he won eight German national longtrack championship titles.

Maier also forged a career in conventional speedway, earning 38 international caps and participating in four consecutive Speedway World Championship finals from 1983 until 1986 and a fifth final in 1989.

Maier rode three seasons in Britain, riding for Belle Vue Aces in 1979 and Birmingham Brummies from 1982 to 1983.

== Personal life ==
Maier is a master mechanic and owner of a BMW motorcycle dealership, as well as was the owner of a Toyota car dealership in Erding. He lives in Neufinsing, is married and has a daughter.

== Results ==
=== World Longtrack Championship ===
==== Finals ====
- 1978 (West Germany) Mühldorf (7th) 17pts
- 1979 (Czechoslovakia) Mariánské Lázně (6th) 13pts
- 1980 (West Germany) Scheeßel (Champion) 23pts
- 1981 (Socialist Federal Republic of Yugoslavia) Radgona (13th) 5pts
- 1982 (Denmark) Esbjerg (Champion) 24pts
- 1983 (Czechoslovakia) Mariánské Lázně (Third) 18pts
- 1984 (West Germany) Herxheim (Third) 17pts
- 1986 (West Germany) Herxheim (6th) 11pts
- 1987 (West Germany) Mühldorf (Champion) 22pts
- 1988 (West Germany) Scheeßel (Champion) 42pts
- 1989 (Czechoslovakia) Mariánské Lázně (Third) 33pts
- 1990 (Germany) Herxheim (Second) 30pts
- 1991 (Czech Republic) Mariánské Lázně (7th) 10pts
- 1992 (Germany) Pfarrkirchen (Third) 20pts
- 1993 (Germany) Mühldorf (Second) 20pts
- 1995 (Germany) Scheeßel (6th) 14pts
- 1996 (Germany) Herxheim (6th) 11pts

=== World Final appearances ===
==== Individual World Championship ====
- 1983 - (West Germany) Norden, Motodrom Halbemond - 9th - 8pts
- 1984 - (Sweden) Gothenburg, Ullevi - 9th - 7pts
- 1985 - (England) Bradford, Odsal Stadium - 16th - 1pt
- 1986 - (Poland) Chorzów, Silesian Stadium - 13th - 3pts
- 1989 - (West Germany) Munich, Olympic Stadium - 11th - 5pts

==== World Pairs Championship ====
- 1983 - (Sweden) Gothenburg, Ullevi (with Egon Müller) - 6th - 12pts (6)
- 1986 - (West Germany) Pocking, Rottalstadion (with Klaus Lausch) - 6th - 27pts (22)
- 1989 - (Poland) Leszno, Alfred Smoczyk Stadium (with Gerd Riss) - 4th - 36pts (22)

==== World Team Cup ====
- 1981 - (West Germany) Olching, Speedway Stadion Olching (with Egon Müller / Georg Hack / Georg Gilgenreiner) - 3rd - 28pts (8)
- 1982 - (England) London, White City Stadium (with Georg Hack / Egon Müller / Alois Wiesböck / Georg Gilgenreiner) - 3rd - 18pts (7)
