= Simon Wigg =

British motorcycle speedway rider

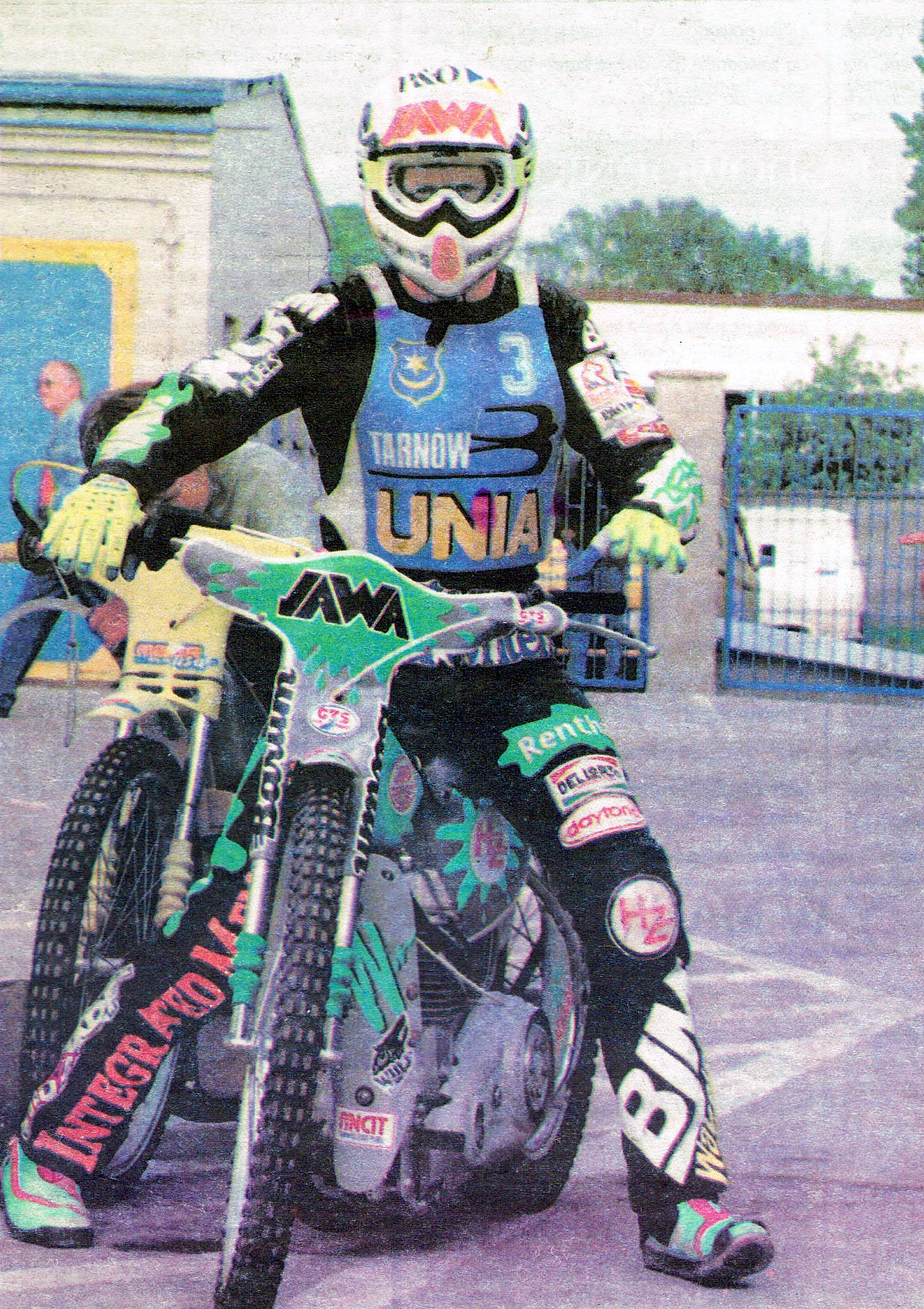
- Born: 15 October 1960; Aylesbury, England
- Died: 15 November 2000 (aged 40)
- Nationality: British (English)

Career history

Great Britain
- 1980–1982: Weymouth Wildcats
- 1981–1983: Cradley Heathens
- 1981: Birmingham Brummies
- 1984–1986, 1988–1990: Oxford Cheetahs
- 1987: Hackney Kestrels
- 1991–1992: Bradford Dukes
- 1993: Coventry Bees
- 1995: Long Eaton Invaders
- 1996: Exeter Falcons
- 1997–1998: King's Lynn Stars

Sweden
- 1990: Indianerna
- 1992-1993, 1995: Vetlanda

Individual honours
- 1985, 1986: Mr Melbourne winner
- 1985, 1989, 1990, 1993, 1994: Long Track World Champion
- 1988, 1989: British Speedway Champion
- 1989: Commonwealth Final winner
- 1990, 1994, 1995: Australian Long track Grand Prix
- 1994: New Zealand Long track Grand Prix
- 1994: Golden Helmet of Pardubice
- 1996: Grand Prix Challenge
- 1981, 1984, 1993: Ace of Aces Grasstrack Champion
- 1981, 1982, 1983, 1985, 1989, 1990: British Masters Grasstrack Champion

Team honours
- 1989: World Team Cup Winner
- 1982: National League Pairs Champion
- 1983, 1985, 1986, 1989: British League Champion
- 1982, 1983, 1985, 1986 (shared), 1991, 1992: British League KO Cup winner
- 1985, 1986: British League Pairs Champion
- 1982, 1986 (shared): British League Cup Winner
- 1990: Swedish Elite League winner
- 1983, 1985, 1986: Midland Cup Winner

Simon Antony Wigg (15 October 1960 – 15 November 2000) was an English speedway, grasstrack and longtrack rider. He won five World Long Track Championships and finished runner-up in the Speedway World Championship in 1989. He earned 57 international caps for the England national speedway team.

== Education ==
After relocating with his family several times as a child, Wigg gained a scholarship to Woodbridge School in Suffolk, where he and his brother began their interest in motorcycle racing, attending Ipswich Witches meetings at Foxhall and riding in grasstrack competitions.

== Career ==
Wigg was born in Aylesbury, Buckinghamshire. In 1980, he joined his first speedway club, Weymouth Wildcats, and in 1982, Wigg won the British League Division Two Pairs Championship with Martin Yeates with the sea-side town club. After joining Cradley Heath in 1983, he won the treble of league, Knockout Cup and Midland Cup.

In 1984, Wigg was signed by Oxford Cheetahs who bought him from Cradley Heath Heathens for £25,000. The Oxford team had returned to the British League and the other signings to start as the top five riders for the season were Hans Nielsen for a record £30,000, Marvyn Cox for £15,000, Melvyn Taylor for £12,000 and Jens Rasmussen, with Ian Clark and Nigel Sparshott at 6 & 7. It was in 1984 that he qualified for his first World Final.

After a mid table finish in 1984, Wigg was part of the Oxford team that won the league and cup double during a 1985 British League season. Also in 1985, he became the second British World Longtrack Champion (Michael Lee was the first in 1981) and went on to win the title a further four times. He was the most successful British grasstrack and longtrack rider ever.

Wigg while riding in Oxford, met his wife to be, Charlie, and after a few years together they had two children. In 1986, Wigg was part of the Oxford team that won a second consecutive league and cup double during the 1986 British League season.

1988 saw Wigg become British Speedway Champion and he retained the title the following year. 1989 also saw him captain the Great Britain speedway team when they won the World Team Cup. In 1989, he won the Commonwealth Final and then finished runner-up to his Cheetahs teammate Hans Nielsen in the World Final at the Olympiastadion in Munich. His team Oxford also won the league title in the 1989 British League season.

Wigg rode in the Polish League for Unia Tarnów in 1992 (10 matches, CMA 9.89), Unia Leszno (1994, 2 matches, 6.80), Stal Rzeszów (1997, 1 match, 11.00) and Falubaz Zielona Góra (1998, 1 match, 6.40). In 1993, he joined Coventry Bees for the season.

In October 1996, during the Speedway Grand Prix Qualification, Wigg won the GP Challenge, which ensured that he claimed a permanent slot for the 1997 Grand Prix.

During his career, Wigg was a frequent visitor to Australia and always enjoyed success on the larger Showground tracks down under such as the Brisbane Exhibition Ground, the 510 metres (560 yd) Wayville Showground in Adelaide, the Claremont Speedway in Perth, and the Melbourne Showgrounds. During his time riding in both Australia and New Zealand, Wigg won the Australian Long track Grand Prix in 1990, 1994 and 1995, as well as the New Zealand Long track Grand Prix in 1994.

Wigg was also famous for his bright green leathers and bikes, being nicknamed "The Lean Green Racing Machine". He rode in 65 meetings for England.

== Death ==
After suffering epileptic seizures in November 1998 and January 1999, which were originally attributed to head trauma from racing crashes, Wigg was diagnosed with a brain tumour, and had surgery to remove it in May 1999. After recovering, he moved with his family to Gold Coast, Queensland, but after falling ill again in February 2000, returned to the UK for further surgery after discovering that the tumour had regrown. Wigg died on 15 November 2000 at the age of 40.

== World Longtrack Championship record ==
Five Times Champion

Final

- 1982 (Denmark) Esbjerg 5pts (13th)
- 1983 (Czechoslovakia) Mariánské Lázně 11pts (7th)
- 1985 (Denmark) Esbjerg 22pts (Champion)
- 1987 (West Germany) Mühldorf 21pts (Second)
- 1988 (Germany) Scheeßel 21pts (8th)
- 1989 (Czech Republic) Mariánské Lázně 38pts (Champion)
- 1990 (Germany) Herxheim 37pts (Champion)
- 1991 (Czech Republic) Mariánské Lázně 10pts (9th)
- 1992 (Germany) Pfarrkirchen 0pts (19th)
- 1993 (Germany) Mühldorf 22pts (Champion)
- 1994 (Czech Republic) Mariánské Lázně 25pts (Champion)
- 1995 (Germany) Scheeßel 20pts (Second) * After run-off with Kelvin Tatum
- 1996 (Germany) Herxheim 11pts (7th)

Grand Years

1998 Four G.P. 40pts (10th)

== World Speedway final appearances ==
=== World Championship ===
- 1984 - (Sweden) Gothenburg, Ullevi - 6th - 9pts
- 1988 - (Denmark) Vojens, Speedway Center - 6th - 9pts
- 1989 - (West Germany) Munich, Olympic Stadium - 2nd - 12pts + 3pts

=== World Pairs Championship ===
- 1986 - (West Germany) Pocking, Rottalstadion (with Jeremy Doncaster) - 7th - 23pts (11)
- 1987 - (Czechoslovakia) Pardubice, Svítkov Stadion (with Kelvin Tatum) - 2nd - 44pts (20)

=== World Team Cup ===
- 1984 - (Poland) Leszno, Alfred Smoczyk Stadium (with Chris Morton / Peter Collins / Phil Collins / Neil Collins) - 2nd - 24pts (9)
- 1986 - (Sweden) Gothenburg, Ullevi, (Denmark) Vojens, Speedway Center and (England) Bradford, Odsal Stadium (with Kelvin Tatum / Neil Evitts / Jeremy Doncaster / Chris Morton / Marvyn Cox) - 3rd - 81pts (24)
- 1987 - (Denmark) Fredericia, Fredericia Speedway, (England) Coventry, Brandon Stadium and (Czechoslovakia) Prague, Marketa Stadium (with Kelvin Tatum / Jeremy Doncaster / Simon Cross / Marvyn Cox) - 2nd - 101pts (29)
- 1988 - (United States) Long Beach, Veterans Memorial Stadium (with Simon Cross / Kelvin Tatum / Chris Morton / Gary Havelock) - 4th - 22pts (0)
- 1989 - (England) Bradford, Odsal Stadium (with Jeremy Doncaster / Kelvin Tatum / Paul Thorp / Simon Cross) - Winner - 48pts (11)
- 1990 - (Czech Republic) Pardubice, Svítkov Stadion (with Kelvin Tatum / Jeremy Doncaster / Marvyn Cox / Gary Havelock) - 2nd - 34pts (8)

== Speedway Grand Prix results ==
Year	Position	Points	Best finish	Notes
1997	17th	13	10th	-

== British Grasstrack Championship Record ==
- 1981 - British 500cc Grasstrack @ Coxwold, Clyst St. Mary & Uckington
- 1982 - British Masters Grasstrack @ Condover & Exeter
- 1983 - British Masters Grasstrack @ Clyst St George & Long Marston
- 1985 - British Masters Grasstrack @ Eaton
- 1989 - British Masters Grasstrack @ Chetton & Winterbourne Gunner
- 1990 - British Masters Grasstrack @ Sturminster Marshall & Chetton
