= List of Speedway Long Track World Championship riders =

This is a complete list of riders who have competed in the a World Longtrack Championship final (1957–1996) and Grand-Prix Series (1997–2019).

== A ==
- (Germany) Fred Aberl
- (Finland) Tommi Ahlgren
- (Germany) Josef Aigner
- (England) Oliver Allen
- (Germany) John Andersen
- (Sweden) Evert Andersson
- (Germany) Josef Angermüller
- (England) Andrew Appleton
- (Wales) Tony Atkin
- (United States) Scott Autrey

== B ==
- (Germany) Daniel Bacher
- (Australia) Steve Baker
- (England) Trevor Banks
- (Germany) Robert Barth
- (Australia) Troy Batchelor
- (Germany) Paul Bauer
- (Germany) Robert Bauman
- (Netherlands) Mark Beishuizen
- (France) David Bellego
- (France) Dimitri Bergé
- (France) Philippe Bergé
- (Germany) Christoph Betzl
- (Germany) Julian Bielmeier
- (Italy) Francesco Biginato
- (England) Steve Bishop
- (Norway) Inge Bjerk
- (Denmark) Hans Peter Boisen
- (Denmark) Preben Bollerup
- (Norway) Kenneth Borgenhaugh
- (Netherlands) Uppie Bos
- (Austria) Andy Bossner
- (Norway) Egil Bratvold
- (Czech Republic) Bohumil Brhel
- (New Zealand) Barry Briggs
- (New Zealand) Tony Briggs
- (Germany) Bernd Broker
- (Germany) Gunther Bunning
- (England) Jason Bunyan
- (Poland) Stanisław Burza
- (Denmark) Alf Busk

== C ==
- (Sweden) Bertil Carlsson
- (France) Julien Cayre
- (Czech Republic) Marek Čejka
- (Czech Republic) Vlastimil Červenka
- (Austria) Josef Chalupa
- (France) Anthony Chauffour
- (Denmark) Preben Moller Christensen
- (England) Les Collins
- (England) Peter Collins
- (England) Phil Collins
- (England) Shane Colvin
- (Germany) Detlaf Conradi
- (England) Paul Cooper
- (England) Marvyn Cox
- (England) Simon Cross
- (Australia) Jason Crump
- (England) Glenn Cunningham

== D ==
- (Germany) Marcel Dachs
- (Germany) Alfred Dannmeyer
- (Sweden) Roland Dannö
- (Sweden) Stefan Dannö
- (England) Tony Dart
- (Netherlands) Jannick de Jong
- (Netherlands) Jackie de Vries
- (Netherlands) Jarno de Vries
- (France) Richard di Biasi
- (France) Theo di Palma
- (Germany) Bernd Diener
- (Germany) Heinrich Diener
- (Germany) Max Dilger
- (Germany) Bernd Dinklage
- (England) Jeremy Doncaster
- (Germany) Kai Dorenkamp
- (Czech Republic) Aleš Dryml Sr.
- (France) Christophe Dubernard
- (France) Gabriel Dubernard
- (France) Jordan Dubernard
- (France) Alexander Dubrana
- (Germany) Wilhelm Duden
- (Germany) Tommy Dunker

== E ==
- (England) Colin Earl
- (Germany) Maik Edensing
- (Norway) Einar Egedius
- (Germany) Markus Eibl
- (Netherlands) Erik Eijbergen
- (United States) Sam Ermolenko
- (Russia) Sergej Eroshin

== F ==
- (Netherlands) Dirk Fabriek
- (Sweden) Sven Fahlén
- (Sweden) Birger Forsberg
- (Czech Republic) Jaroslav Franc
- (Czech Republic) Josef Franc
- (Finland) Leo Frantila
- (Germany) Nadine Frenk
- (England) Paul Fry
- (Sweden) Ove Fundin

== G ==
- (Germany) Klaus Peter Gerdemann
- (Switzerland) Marcel Gerhard
- (Germany) Walter Gernert
- (Germany) Uwe Gessner
- (Germany) Georg Gilgenreiner
- (England) Don Godden
- (England) Mitch Godden
- (France) Steven Goret
- (Netherlands) Emiel Groen
- (Netherlands) Jim Groen
- (Netherlands) Maik Groen
- (Germany) Walter Grubmuller
- (Denmark) Erik Gundersen
- (Norway) Lars Gunnestad
- (Sweden) Henrik Gustafsson

== H ==
- (Germany) Georg Hack
- (Czech Republic) Bořivoj Hádek
- (Czech Republic) Michael Hádek
- (England) Martin Hagon
- (Sweden) Bo Hakansson
- (England) Richard Hall
- (Denmark) Einar Hansen
- (Denmark) Henning Hansen
- (Denmark) Kenneth Kruse Hansen
- (Denmark) Lars B. Hansen
- (Norway) Roger Hansen
- (Norway) Nils Haraldsen
- (Norway) Sverre Harrfeldt
- (England) Chris Harris
- (Germany) Michael Hartel
- (Germany) Roberto Haupt
- (Finland) Aarni Heikkila
- (Hungary) Csaba Hell
- (Norway) Gunnar Hilsen
- (Germany) Josef Hofmeister
- (Germany) Cord Heinrich Hoft
- (Czech Republic) Jan Holub
- (Czech Republic) Zdeněk Holub
- (Norway) Berndt Hornfeldt
- (New Zealand) Strider Horton
- (Norway) Jon Hovind
- (England) David Howe
- (Germany) Heinz Huber
- (Germany) Kai Huckenbeck
- (Germany) Christian Hulshorst
- (Netherlands) Romano Hummel
- (England) Paul Hurry
- (Norway) Basse Hveem

== J ==
- (Denmark) Brian Jacobsen
- (Germany) Enrico Janoschka
- (Sweden) Joel Jansson
- (Czech Republic) Lubomír Jedek
- (Denmark) Bent Nørregaard-Jensen
- (Denmark) Finn Rune Jensen
- (Czech Republic) Jiří Jirout
- (Norway) Svein Johansen
- (Australia) Steve Johnston
- (Sweden) Thomas H. Jonasson
- (Denmark) John Jørgensen
- (Finland) Kauko Jousanen
- (Germany) Rainer Junglin
- (Norway) Kim Rudi Juritzen

== K ==
- (Czech Republic) Karel Kadlec
- (Germany) Joachim Kall
- (Austria) Josef Kamper
- (Denmark) Brian Karger
- (Czech Republic) Pavel Karnas
- (Czech Republic) Antonín Kasper Jr.
- (Germany) Rudolf Kastl
- (Germany) Jan Kater
- (Germany) Stephan Katt
- (Socialist Federal Republic of Yugoslavia) Stefan Kekec
- (Germany) Thorsten Kerl
- (Germany) Horst Kinkelbur
- (Russia) Oleg Kiptev
- (Sweden) Bjorn Knutson
- (Hungary) Antal Kocso
- (Socialist Federal Republic of Yugoslavia) Vlado Kocuvan
- (Netherlands) Fritz Koning
- (Finland) Ari Koponen
- (Finland) Esko Koponen
- (Finland) Reijo Koski
- (Norway) Odvar Kristiansen
- (Netherlands) Tony Kroeze
- (Germany) Matthias Kroger
- (Germany) Toni Kroger
- (Czech Republic) Michaela Krupníková
- (Czech Republic) Stanislav Kubíček
- (Czech Republic) Zdeněk Kudrna
- (Russia) Oleg Kurguskin
- (Finland) Eino Kylmakorpi
- (Finland) Joonas Kylmäkorpi

== L ==
- (Poland) Adam Labedzki
- (Finland) Kalevi Lahtinen
- (Finland) Timo Laine
- (Germany) Otto Lantenhammer
- (Germany) Klaus Lausch
- (Czech Republic) František Ledecký
- (England) Michael Lee
- (Finland) Rene Lehtinen
- (Australia) Mark Lemon
- (France) Jeremy Coste Lescoul
- (France) Jerome Lespinasse
- (Germany) Goerg Limbrunner
- (Sweden) Bert Lindarw
- (Sweden) Sture Lindblom
- (Germany) Ralf Loding
- (Finland) Reima Lohkovuori
- (England) Mark Loram
- (Netherlands) Nick Lourens

== M ==
- (Czech Republic) Jaroslav Machač
- (Germany) Danny Maassen
- (Germany) Karl Maier
- (Czech Republic) Zdeněk Majstr
- (Czech Republic) Martin Málek
- (New Zealand) Brendan Manu
- (Germany) Walter Matl
- (New Zealand) Ivan Mauger
- (France) Maxime Mazeau
- (Netherlands) Mika Meijer
- (Netherlands) Dave Meijerink
- (Norway) Thore Melbye
- (Sweden) Anders Mellgren
- (Finland) Veikko Metsahuone
- (Sweden) Anders Michanek
- (Italy) Alessandro Milanese
- (Czech Republic) Václav Milík Sr.
- (Italy) Massimo Mora
- (United States) Shawn Moran
- (England) Chris Morton
- (Germany) Egon Muller
- (Germany) Hans-Jorg Muller
- (Germany) Heiko Muller
- (Finland) Aki Pekka Mustonen
- (Finland) Jesse Mustonen

== N ==
- (Germany) Otto Niedermeier
- (Denmark) Jan Holm Nielsen
- (Denmark) Hans Nielsen
- (Denmark) Jens-Henry Nielsen
- (Finland) Kai Niemi
- (Denmark) Svend Nissen
- (Denmark) Kent Noer
- (Sweden) Olle Nygren
- (Sweden) Tage Nyholm
- (Sweden) Joel Nyström

== O ==
- (Norway) Jon Ødegaard
- (Finland) Matti Olin
- (Denmark) Ole Olsen
- (Czech Republic) Pavel Ondrašík
- (Czech Republic) Petr Ondrašík
- (Sweden) Ake Ostblom
- (France) Fabrice Ostyn
- (France) Philippe Ostyn

== P ==
- (Finland) Antti Pajari
- (Denmark) Arne Pander
- (Germany) Jan Pape
- (Australia) Shane Parker
- (Denmark) Erik Pedersen
- (Denmark) Jan O. Pedersen
- (United States) Bruce Penhall
- (Sweden) Valter Persson
- (Denmark) Bo Petersen
- (Denmark) Kurt W. Petersen
- (Norway) Lasse Pettersson
- (Germany) David Pfeffer
- (England) Glen Phillips
- (Netherlands) Theo Pijper
- (Germany) Hans Otto Pingel
- (Germany) Andre Pollehn
- (Germany) Manfred Poschenreider
- (Denmark) Kristian Præstbro
- (Sweden) Stig Pramberg
- (Czech Republic) Jaroslav Pták
- (Finland) Simo Pulli
- (Germany) Purzer Georg

== R ==
- (Finland) Mikko Rahko
- (Germany) Daniel Rath
- (England) Matt Read
- (Czech Republic) František Richter
- (Germany) Erik Riss
- (Germany) Gerd Riss
- (Norway) Marius Rokeberg
- (Denmark) Preben Rosenkilde
- (Denmark) Jens Rossig
- (Norway) Ole Rostad
- (Netherlands) Sjoerd Rozenberg
- (Germany) Herbert Rudolph

== S ==
- (Sweden) Conny Samuelsson
- (Germany) Walter Scherwitzki
- (Germany) Werner Schlott
- (Czech Republic) Zdeněk Schneiderwind
- (England) Steve Schofield
- (Germany) Sirg Schutzbach
- (United States) Bobby Schwartz
- (Germany) Gottfried Schwarze
- (England) Joe Screen
- (Germany) Josef Seidl
- (England) James Shanes
- (New Zealand) Mitch Shirra
- (Germany) Hans Siegl
- (Sweden) Sven Sigurd
- (Norway) Erling Simonsen
- (Germany) Josef Sinzinger
- (Poland) Adolf Slabon
- (England) Andy Smith
- (Germany) Martin Smolinski
- (Sweden) Per Olof Söderman
- (Sweden) Rune Sörmander
- (Finland) Heikki Sorri
- (Czech Republic) Emil Sova
- (Germany) Richard Speiser
- (Czech Republic) Milan Špinka
- (Germany) Heinrich Sprenger jnr
- (Germany) Heinrich Sprenger snr
- (Czech Republic) Jiří Štancl
- (Norway) Edgar Stangeland
- (Norway) Roger Steen
- (France) Gaetan Stella
- (Sweden) Agnar Stenlund
- (Sweden) Erik Stenlund
- (Czech Republic) Hynek Štichauer
- (Netherlands) Mark Stiekema
- (Finland) Hakan Storm
- (Sweden) Bertil Strid
- (Czech Republic) Antonín Šváb Jr.
- (Czech Republic) Antonín Šváb Sr.
- (Czech Republic) Jiří Svoboda
- (Netherlands) Pascal Swart

== T ==
- (Finland) Juhani Taipale
- (England) Kelvin Tatum
- (England) Neville Tatum
- (New Zealand) Sam Taylor
- (Germany) Jorg Tebbe
- (Finland) Ilmo Terrace
- (France) Cyril Thomas
- (Sweden) Willihard Thomsson
- (Australia) John Titman
- (Netherlands) Willy Tjissem
- (Czech Republic) Luboš Tomíček Sr.
- (France) Mathieu Trésarrieu
- (France) Sebastien Trésarrieu
- (France) Stéphane Trésarrieu
- (Ukraine) Vladimir Trofimov
- (Norway) Hans Trovik
- (Germany) Mario Trupkovic
- (Finland) Aulis Tuominen
- (Finland) Olavi Turunen

== U ==
- (Germany) Josef Unterholzner
- (Sweden) Hans Utterstrom

== V ==
- (Germany) Louis-Alberto Vallejos
- (Netherlands) Piet van Aartsen
- (Netherlands) Anne van der Helm
- (Netherlands) Steven van der Helm
- (Netherlands) Henry van der Steen
- (Netherlands) Rene van Weele
- (Czech Republic) Petr Vandírek
- (Netherlands) Roy Verbrugge
- (Czech Republic) Jan Verner
- (Czech Republic) Miloslav Verner
- (Czech Republic) Václav Verner
- (Germany) Heinz Viets
- (Germany) Hermann Viets
- (Czech Republic) Jaroslav Volf
- (Germany) Andreas Volker

== W ==
- (Germany) Fabian Wachs
- (England) Zach Wajtknecht
- (Austria) Gunther Walla
- (Germany) Hans Wassermann
- (Australia) Chris Watson
- (Australia) Craig Watson
- (Sweden) Runo Wedin
- (Germany) Otto Weiss
- (Norway) Rolf Westerberg
- (Germany) Alois Wiesböck
- (England) Simon Wigg
- (Denmark) Poul Wissing
- (Czech Republic) Richard Wolff
- (Australia) Cameron Woodward
- (Netherlands) Jeffrey Wortman

== Z ==
- (Netherlands) Lars Zandvliet
- (Germany) Hans Zierk
- (Germany) Manfred Zimmermann
