= 1969 Individual Long Track European Championship =

International motorcycle speedway competition

1969 Long Track European Championship

The 1969 Individual Long Track European Championship was the 13th edition of the Long Track European Championship. The final was held on 3 September 1969 in Oslo, Norway.

The title was won by Don Godden of England.

== Venues ==
- 1st qualifying round - Gornja Radgona, 1 June 1969
- Qualifying Round 2 - Straubing, 1 June 1969
- Scandinavian final - Oslo, 19 June 1969
- semi-final - Scheeßel, 22 June 1969
- Final - Oslo - 3 September 1969

== Final Classification ==
Pos	Rider	Pts
1	(England) Don Godden	14
2	(Norway) Jon Ødegaard	18
3	(Denmark) Kurt W. Petersen	11
4	(Finland) Timo Laine	10
5	(Sweden) Willihard Thomsson	11
6	(Sweden) Runo Wedin	10
7	(Sweden) Sture Lindblom	11
8	(West Germany) Manfred Poschenreider	15
9	(West Germany) Josef Unterholzner	7
10	(Denmark) Jan Holm Nielsen	7
11	(Norway) Jon Hovind	7
12	(Denmark) Preben M Christensen	7
13	(West Germany) Hans Siegl	6
14	(West Germany) Jan Kater	4
15	(West Germany) Fred Aberl	3
16	(Czechoslovakia) Frantisek Ledecky	2
17	(Czechoslovakia) Jaroslav Machač	1
18	(Austria) Gunther Walla	0
