= 1966 Individual Long Track European Championship =

International motorcycle speedway competition

1966 Long Track European Championship

The 1966 Individual Long Track European Championship was the tenth edition of the Long Track European Championship. The final was held on 17 July 1966 in Mühldorf, West Germany.

The title was won by Manfred Poschenreider of Sweden.

== Venues ==
- Qualifying Round 1 - Scheeßel, 5 June 1966
- Qualifying Round 2 - Lahti, 19 June 1966
- Qualifying Round 3 - Skive, 26 June 1966
- Final - Mühldorf, 17 July 1966

== Final Classification ==
Pos	Rider	Pts
1	(West Germany) Manfred Poschenreider	15
2	(Denmark) Kurt W. Petersen	16
3	(Norway) Jon Ødegaard	12
4	(West Germany) Josef Unterholzner	11
5	(England) Don Godden	7
6	(Sweden) Sven Sigurd	8
7	(Sweden) Willihard Thomsson	14
8	(West Germany) Fred Aberl	8
9	(Finland) Timo Laine	7
10	(West Germany) Heinrich Sprenger	6
11	(Finland) Reijo Koski	6
12	(West Germany) Werner Schlott	6
13	(Sweden) Runo Wedin	6
14	(West Germany) Rainer Jungling	5
15	(Finland) Veikko Metsahuone	4
16	(Norway) Svein Johansen	3
17	(Finland) uhani Taipale	2
18	(Denmark) Ole Olsen	0
