= 1962 Individual Long Track European Championship =

Motorcycle racing competition

1962 Long Track European Championship

The 1962 Individual Long Track European Championship was the sixth edition of the Long Track European Championship. The final was held on 22 July 1962 in Mühldorf, West Germany.

The title was won by Bertil Stridh of Sweden.

== Venues ==
- Qualifying Round 1 - Aarhus, 27 May 1962
- Qualifying Round 2 - Hamburg, 17 June 1962
- Qualifying Round 3 - Tampere, 1 July 1962
- Final - Mühldorf, 22 July 1962

== Final Classification ==
Pos	Rider	Pts
1	(Sweden) Bertil Stridh	12
2	(West Germany) Josef Seidl	15
3	(Finland) Timo Laine	13
4	(Norway) Erling Simonsen	9
5	(West Germany) Manfred Poschenreider	12
6	(Sweden) Rune Sörmander	9
7	(Sweden) Ake Ostblom	9
8	(West Germany) Josef Hofmeister	13
9	(West Germany) Josef Unterholzner	8
10	(Norway) Svend Nissen	6
11	(West Germany) Aberl Fred	6
12	(Sweden) Ove Fundin	5
13	(Finland) Olavi Turunen	5
14	(Sweden) Sven Fahlén	4
15	(Denmark) Poul Wissing	4
16	(Norway) Egil Bratvold	2
17	(Finland) Kauko Jousanen	0
18	(Norway) Ole Rostad	0
