= 1967 Individual Long Track European Championship =

International motorcycle speedway competition

1967 Long Track European Championship

The 1967 Individual Long Track European Championship was the 11th edition of the Long Track European Championship. The final was held on 3 September 1967 in Scheeßel, West Germany.

The title was won by Manfred Poschenreider of West Germany for the second successive year.

== Venues ==
- Qualifying Round 1 - Straubing, 1 May 1967
- Qualifying Round 2 - Skive, 28 May 1967
- Qualifying Round 3 - Mühldorf am Inn, 4 June 1967
- Final - Scheeßel - 3 September 1967

== Final Classification ==
Pos	Rider	Pts
1	(West Germany) Manfred Poschenreider	13
2	(England) Don Godden	13
3	(Norway) Jon Ødegaard	11
4	(Denmark) Kurt W. Petersen	10
5	(Finland) Timo Laine	15
6	(West Germany) Rudolf Kastl	15
7	(Finland) Juhani Taipale	9
8	(Sweden) Willihard Thomsson	9
9	(West Germany) Heinrich Sprenger	8
10	(Finland) Matti Olin	8
11	(West Germany) Rainer Jungling	7
12	(West Germany) Gottfried Schwarze	6
13	(West Germany) Fred Aberl	4
14	(West Germany) Josef Unterholzner	3
15	(Norway) Hans Trovik	2
16	(Austria) Gunther Walla	1
17	(West Germany) Josef Sinzinger	0
18	(Finland) Veikko Metsahuone	0
