= 2024 FIM Long Track World Championship =

World motorcycle racing competition

2024 Individual Long Track World Championship
- Start date: 9 May
- End date: 22 September

The 2024 FIM Long Track World Championship was the 54th edition of the FIM Individual Long Track World Championship. It was staged over five rounds, one less than in 2023.

Martin Smolinski was the defending champion having won the title in 2023. He was one of four former champions competing in the 2024 series.

Smolinski successfully defended his title, winning three of the five rounds in the process.

== Venues ==
Final	Date	Venue	Winner
1	9 May	(Germany) Herxheim	(Germany) Martin Smolinski
2	13 July	(France) Marmande	(Germany) Lukas Fienhage
3	18 August	(Germany) Scheessel	(Germany) Martin Smolinski
4	14 September	(Germany) Vechta	(Germany) Martin Smolinski
5	22 September	(Netherlands) Roden	(Germany) Lukas Fienhage

== Intermediate Classification ==
Pos	Rider	Final 1	Final 2	Final 3	Final 4	Final 5	Total
1	(Germany) Martin Smolinski	21	17	21	21	17	97
2	(Germany) Lukas Fienhage	17	21	17	17	21	93
3	(England) Zach Wajtknecht	19	19	15	15	19	87
4	(England) Chris Harris	15	15	19	19	15	83
5	(England) Andrew Appleton	10	2	5	13	9	39
6	(Denmark) Kenneth Kruse Hansen	3	7	8	10	11	39
7	(Netherlands) Mika Meijer	x	11	9	5	13	38
8	(Czech Republic) Hynek Štichauer	1	5	7	11	8	32
9	(Netherlands) Romano Hummel	7	8	11	3	x	29
10	(Denmark) Jakub Bukhave	4	3	4	7	7	25
11	(Netherlands) Dave Meijerink	11	13	x	x	x	24
12	(France) Mathias Trésarrieu	x	10	2	9	2	23
13	(France) Jordan Dubernard	9	4	3	4	3	23
14	(Finland) Henri Ahlbom	5	1	1	2	10	19
15	(Finland) Tero Aarnio	2	x	10	x	4	16
16	(Germany) Erik Riss	13	x	x	x	x	13
	(Germany) Stephan Katt	x	x	13	x	x	13
18	(France) Steven Goret	x	9	x	x	x	9
19	(Germany) Michael Härtel	8	x	x	x	x	8
	(Germany) Max Dilger	0	x	x	8	x	8
21	(Netherlands) Henry van der Steen	x	x	x	x	5	5
22	(Germany) Mario Niedermaier	x	x	x	1	x	1
	(Netherlands) Nigel Hummel	x	x	x	x	1	1
24	(Germany) Daniel Spiller	x	x	0	x	x	0
	(Germany) Fabian Wachs	x	x	0	x	x	0
	(Germany) Timo Wachs	x	x	x	0	x	0

== See also ==
- 2024 FIM Long Track of Nations
