= 1968 Individual Long Track European Championship =

International motorcycle speedway competition

1968 Long Track European Championship

The 1968 Individual Long Track European Championship was the 12th edition of the Long Track European Championship. The final was held on 30 June 1968 in Mühldorf, West Germany.

The title was won by Manfred Poschenreider of West Germany for the third successive year. He was the first rider to achieve the feat of winning three titles.

== Venues ==
- Qualifying Round 1 - Scheeßel, 26 May 1968
- Scandinavian final - Nyköping, 26 May 1968
- Qualifying Round 2 - Gornja Radgona, 2 June 1968
- semi-final - Hamburg, 9 June 1968
- Final - Mühldorf - 30 June 1968

== Final Classification ==
Pos	Rider	Pts
1	(West Germany) Manfred Poschenreider	10
2	(England) Don Godden	16
3	(Denmark) Kurt W. Petersen	12
4	(Finland) Timo Laine	13
5	(Sweden) Willihard Thomsson	13
6	(West Germany) Rainer Jungling	10
7	(Czechoslovakia) Antonín Šváb Sr.	10
8	(Sweden) Sture Lindbolme	8
9	(Norway) Jon Ødegaard	8
10	(Sweden) Sven Sigurd	7
11	(Denmark) Preben M Christensen	7
12	(West Germany) Horst Kinkelbur	6
13	(West Germany) Jan Kater	6
14	(West Germany) Rudolf Kastl	6
15	(West Germany) Heinrich Sprenger	5
16	(Austria) Gunther Walla	3
17	(Czechoslovakia) Luboš Tomíček Sr.	2
18	(Sweden) Runo Wedin	2
