= 2019 FIM Long Track World Championship =

Motorcycle racing competition

2019 Individual Long Track World Championship

The 2019 Individual Long Track/Grasstrack World Championship is the 49th edition of the FIM speedway Individual Long Track World Championship.

== Venues ==
Round	Date	Venue
1	30 May	(Germany) Herxheim bei Landau/Pfalz
2	15 June	(France) La Réole
3	7 July	(Germany) Mühldorf
4	7 September	(France) Morizès
5	22 September	(Netherlands) Roden

== Current classification ==
Pos	Num	Rider	Round 1	Round 2	Round 3	Round 4	Round 5	Total Pts
1	96	(France) Dimitri Bergé	21	26	24	24	26	121
2	84	(Germany) Martin Smolinski	24	23	27	20	19	113
3	3	(France) Mathieu Trésarrieu	21	20	18	23	19	101
4	125	(Germany) Lukas Fienhage	12	13	14	18	22	79
5	444	(Czech Republic) Josef Franc	15	6	18	18	20	77
6	115	(Netherlands) Theo Pijper	14	9	21	9	13	66
7	37	(England) Chris Harris	3	18	5	11	13	50
8	95	(Finland) Jesse Mustonen	2	9	12	14	11	48
9	31	(Germany) Max Dilger	8	11	11	6	8	44
10	93	(England) James Shanes	18	11	5			34
11	111	(Czech Republic) Martin Málek	2	8	3	14	7	34
12	24	(England) Andrew Appleton	10	4	10	5	2	31
13	7	(Germany) Bernd Diener	10	5	8	1	3	27
14	109	(England) Zach Wajtknecht				9	16	25
15	15	(Germany) Jörg Tebbe	12			5	0	17
16	666	(Netherlands) Romano Hummel	8	6				14
17	15	(Germany) Stephane Tresarrieu		11		3		14
18	15	(Germany) Stephan Katt			3			3
19	104	(France) Gaetan Stella		NSR	1			1
20	15	(Netherlands) Dave Meijerink					1	1
21	16	(Germany) Fabian Wachs	0					0
	17	(Germany) Julian Bielmeier	NSR					0
	17	(France) Julien Cayre		NSR		NSR		0
	16	(Germany) Marcel Dachs			NSR			0
	17	(Germany) Danny Maassen			NSR			0
	16	(France) Jordan Dubernard				NSR		0
	16	(Netherlands) Henry van der Steen					NSR	0
	17	(Netherlands) Jarno de Vries					NSR	0
