= 1963 Individual Long Track European Championship =

Motorcycle racing competition

1963 Long Track European Championship

The 1963 Individual Long Track European Championship was the seventh edition of the Long Track European Championship. The final was held on 8 September 1963 in Malmö, Sweden.

The title was won by Bertil Stridh of Sweden for the second successive year.

== Venues ==
- 1st Qualifying Round - Pori, 26 May 1963
- Qualifying Round 2 - Scheeßel, 26 May 1963
- Qualifying Round 3 - Mühldorf am Inn, 16 June 1963
- Final - Malmö, 8 September 1963

== Final Classification ==
Pos	Rider	Pts
1	(Sweden) Bertil Stridh	12
2	(Denmark) Kurt W. Petersen	16
3	(West Germany) Manfred Poschenreider	10
4	(Finland) Timo Laine	12
5	(West Germany) Josef Unterholzner	9
6	(Finland) Esko Koponen	12
7	(West Germany) Josef Hofmeister	12
8	(Sweden) Berndt Hornfeldt	10
9	(Norway) Erling Simonsen	9
10	(West Germany) Josef Sinzinger	8
11	(West Germany) Josef Seidl	7
12	(Sweden) Agnar Stenlund	7
13	(West Germany) Hermann Viets	5
14	(Sweden) Evert Andersson	4
15	(East Germany) Hans Zierk	4
16	(Denmark) Svend Nissen	3
17	(Sweden) Bo Hakansson	1
18	(Norway) Sverre Harrfeldt	0
