= 2016 FIM Long Track World Championship =

Motorcycle racing competition

2016 Individual Long Track World Championship

Champion
- Erik Riss

The 2016 Individual Long Track/Grasstrack World Championship was the 46th edition of the FIM speedway Individual Long Track World Championship.

The world title was won by Erik Riss of Germany for the second time.

== Venues ==
Round	Date	Venue
1	19 Jun	(Germany) Mühldorf
2	21 Aug	(Netherlands) Eenrum
3	27 Aug	(Finland) Forssa
4	3 Sep	(France) Morizès
5	17 Sep	(Germany) Vechta

== Final Classification ==
Pos	Rider	Round 1	Round 2	Round 3	Round 4	Round 5	Total Pts
1	(Germany) Erik Riss	25	26	19	24	28	122
2	(Netherlands) Jannick de Jong	21	19	22	16	3	101
3	(France) Mathieu Tresarrieu	16	13	24	21	10	84
4	(Netherlands) Theo Pijper	12	14	17	20	20	83
5	(France) Dimitri Bergé	13	27	12	24	5	81
6	(England) Richard Hall	17	15	4	15	10	61
7	(Czech Republic) Josef Franc	6	11	10	13	15	55
8	(England) Glen Phillips	9	6	8	12	11	46
9	(Finland) Appe Mustonen	14	0	22	0	7	43
10	(Germany) Jörg Tebbe	6	6	14	12	x	38
11	(Finland) Jesse Mustonen	x	6	12	x	16	34
12	(Germany) Matthias Kröger	2	8	11	1	7	29
13	(England) Andrew Appleton	x	6	2	7	13	28
14	(Germany) Martin Smolinski	25	x	x	x	x	25
15	(Germany) Stephan Katt	7	7	2	x	x	16
16	(Netherlands) Dirk Fabriek	x	16	x	x	x	16
17	(France) Theo di Palma	5	x	x	6	4	15
18	(Germany) Michael Hartel	x	x	x	x	7	7
19	(France) Jerome Lespinasse	x	x	x	6	x	6
20	(France) Gabriel Dubernard	x	x	x	4	x	4
21	(France) Stephane Tresarrieu	2	x	x	x	x	2
22	(Italy) Alessandro Milanese	x	x	x	x	1	1
23	(Germany) David Pfeffer	x	x	x	x	1	1
24	(Germany) Kai Dorenkamp	x	x	x	x	1	1
