= 1972 Individual Long Track World Championship =

Long track motorcycle racing event

The 1972 Individual Long Track World Championship was the second edition of the FIM speedway Individual Long Track World Championship. The event was held on 9 July 1972 in Mühldorf, West Germany.

The world title was won by Ivan Mauger of New Zealand for a second successive year.

== Final Classification ==
Pos	Rider	Heat Pts	Heat Pts	Heat Pts	Heat Pts	Heat Pts	Total Pts
1	(New Zealand) Ivan Mauger	6	6	6	6	6	30
2	(West Germany) Manfred Poschenreider	6	3	6	6	2	23
3	(Norway) Jon Ødegaard	3	3	6	2	4	18
4	(West Germany) Hans Siegl	4	4	4	2	3	17
5	(Denmark) Bent Nørregaard-Jensen	6	6	3	1	1	17
6	(Czechoslovakia) Antonín Šváb Sr.	3	4	3	4	-	14
7	(West Germany) Hans Zierk	2	6	2	3	E	13
8	(West Germany) Josef Angermüller	3	4	-	4	E	11
9	(Sweden) Willihard Thomsson	4	3	3	1	E	11
10	(England) Don Godden	4	1	4	-	E	9
11	(West Germany) Rudolf Kastl	f	2	4	3	E	9
12	(West Germany) Jan Kater	2	2	2	0	E	6
13	(West Germany) Heinrich Sprenger	2	0	2	E	E	4
14	(West Germany) Gottfried Schwarze	0	2	1	E	E	3
15	(Denmark) Henning Hansen	1	1	1	E	E	3
16	(Finland) Matti Olin	1	1	0	E	E	2
17	(Norway) Nils Haraldsen	0	0	1	E	E	1
18	(Sweden) Runo Wedin	1	0	0	E	E	1

Key

- E = Eliminated (no further ride)
