= 1965 Individual Long Track European Championship =

International motorcycle speedway competition

1965 Long Track European Championship

The 1965 Individual Long Track European Championship was the ninth edition of the Long Track European Championship. The final was held on 12 September 1965 in Seinäjoki, Finland.

The title was won by Björn Knutson of Sweden.

== Venues ==
- Qualifying Round 1 - Skive, 18 May, 1965
- Qualifying Round 2 - Scheeßel, 30 May, 1965
- Qualifying Round 3 - Mühldorf am Inn, 18 July, 1965
- Final - Seinäjoki, 12 September 1965

== Final Classification ==
Pos	Rider	Pts
1	(Sweden) Björn Knutson	18
2	(Finland) Timo Laine	11
3	(West Germany) Josef Seidl	10
4	(Sweden) Agnar Stenlund	10
5	(Norway) Jon Ødegaard	12
6	(Sweden) Sven Sigurd	9
7	(Finland) Olavi Turunen	14
8	(West Germany) Otto Lantenhammer	12
9	(West Germany) Josef Unterholzner	9
10	(Denmark) Kurt W. Petersen	8
11	(Sweden) Willihard Thomsson	8
12	(Finland) Reima Lohkovuori	5
13	(Denmark) Bengt Jensen	4
14	(Sweden) Evert Andersson	3
15	(Denmark) Svend Nissen	3
16	(Denmark) Hans Peter Boisen	2
17	(Sweden) Runo Wedin	2
18	(Sweden) Per Olof Söderman	2
