= 1970 Individual Long Track European Championship =

International motorcycle speedway competition

1970 Long Track European Championship

The 1970 Individual Long Track European Championship was the 14th edition of the Long Track European Championship. The final was held on 30 August 1970 in Scheeßel, West Germany.

The title was won by Jon Ødegaard of Norway. It was the last time it would be known as the European Championship because from 1971 it was opened to riders of all nations and became the World Long Track Championship.

== Venues ==
- Qualifying round 1 - Straubing, 1 May, 1970
- Final - Scheeßel - 30 August 1970

== Final Classification ==
Pos	Rider	Pts
1	(Norway) Jon Ødegaard	27
2	(England) Don Godden	26
3	(West Germany) Hans Zierk	20
4	(Sweden) Sven Sigurd	18
5	(West Germany) Jan Kater	16
6	(West Germany) Rudolf Kastl	15
7	(Denmark) Bent Nørregaard-Jensen	10
8	(Sweden) Anders Michanek	10
9	(Finland) Timo Laine	8
10	(West Germany) Rainer Jungling	8
11	(Denmark) Kurt W. Petersen	7
12	(West Germany) Georg Purzer	6
13	(Czechoslovakia) Miloslav Verner	6
14	(West Germany) Otto Weiss	6
15	(Sweden) Willihard Thomsson	4
16	(Denmark) Jan Holm Nielsen	2
17	(Sweden) Per Olof Söderman	0
18	(Finland) Matti Olin	0
