= 1964 Individual Long Track European Championship =

International motorcycle speedway competition

1964 Long Track European Championship

The 1964 Individual Long Track European Championship was the eighth edition of the Long Track European Championship. The final was held on 6 September 1964 in Scheeßel, West Germany.

The title was won by Kurt W. Petersen of Denmark.

== Venues ==
- 1st Qualifying Round - Copenhagen, 3 May 1964
- Qualifying Round 2 - Örebro, 7 June 1964
- Qualifying Round 3 - Plattling 2 Aug 1964
- Final - Scheeßel, 6 September 1964

== Final Classification ==
Pos	Rider	Pts
1	(Denmark) Kurt W. Petersen	15
2	(Finland) Olavi Turunen	14
3	(West Germany) Manfred Poschenreider	10
4	(West Germany) Josef Seidl	11
5	(Sweden) Agnar Stenlund	9
6	(West Germany) Alfred Dannmeyer	9
7	(Sweden) Bertil Carlsson	10
8	(Norway) Jon Ødegaard	16
9	(West Germany) Hermann Viets	7
10	(West Germany) Fred Aberl	7
11	(West Germany) Josef Unterholzner	7
12	(Sweden) Sven Sigurd	6
13	(Denmark) Einar Hansen	5
14	(West Germany) Heinz Viets	5
15	(Denmark) John Andersen	4
16	(Finland) Juhani Taipale	3
17	(Sweden) Ake Ostblom	2
18	(West Germany) Otto Lantenhammer	0
