= 2014 FIM Long Track World Championship =

Motorcycle racing competition

2014 Individual Long Track World Championship

The 2014 Individual Long Track/Grasstrack World Championship was the 44th edition of the FIM speedway Individual Long Track World Championship.

The world title was won by Erik Riss of Germany.

== Venues ==
Round	Date	Venue
1	29 May	(Germany) Herxheim
2	13 Jul	(France) Marmande
3	17 Aug	(Netherlands) Eenrum
4	13 Sep	(France) Morizès
5	28 Sep	(Germany) Mühldorf

== Final Classification ==
Pos	Rider	Round 1	Round 2	Round 3	Round 4	Round 5	Total Pts
1	(Germany) Erik Riss	19	19	x	13	26	77
2	(Netherlands) Jannick de Jong	22	21	x	13	16	72
3	(Finland) Joonas Kylmäkorpi	25	8	x	10	23	66
4	(England) Richard Hall	5	20	x	23	17	65
5	(France) Mathieu Tresarrieu	18	16	x	20	10	64
6	(Germany) Stephan Katt	9	19	x	10	14	52
7	(France) Stephane Tresarrieu	8	10	x	18	8	44
8	(Netherlands) Dirk Fabriek	4	15	x	14	7	40
9	(Germany) Jörg Tebbe	16	4	x	9	6	35
10	(Czech Republic) Josef Franc	14	8	x	8	2	32
11	(Netherlands) Theo Pijper	x	11	x	20	x	31
12	(England) David Howe	x	12	x	13	4	29
13	(England) Andrew Appleton	8	5	x	3	12	28
14	(Germany) Martin Smolinski	x	x	x	x	20	20
15	(Australia) Cameron Woodward	6	6	x	x	x	12
16	(Germany) Richard Spieser	7	5	x	x	x	12
17	(Finland) Aki Pekka Mustonen	12	x	x	x	x	12
18	(England) Glen Phillips	x	x	x	x	10	10
19	(Germany) Matthias Kröger	x	x	x	3	5	8
20	(Germany) Bernd Diener	5	x	x	x	x	5
21	(France) Theo di Palma	x	x	x	3	x	3
22	(Germany) Nadine Frenk	2	x	x	x	x	2
23	(France) Gabriel Dubernard	x	1	x	x	x	1
