= 2022 FIM Long Track World Championship =

World motorcycle racing competition

2022 Individual Long Track World Championship
- Start date: 18 June
- End date: 25 September

The 2022 Individual Long Track World Championship was the 52nd edition of the FIM speedway Individual Long Track World Championship.

The Championship was decided by a series of six Grand Prix races, beginning in Rzeszów, Poland, and concluding in Roden, Netherlands.

== Qualification ==
Competitors qualified either through the 2021 Championship, the Longtrack Challenge qualifier or be handed a Wild Card by the FIM

== Venues ==
| Round | Date | Venue | Winner |
|---|---|---|---|
| 1 | 18 June | (Poland) Rzeszów | (Denmark) Kenneth Kruse Hansen |
| 2 | 3 July | (Germany) Mühldorf | (France) Mathieu Trésarrieu |
| 3 | 21 August | (Germany) Scheessel | (France) Mathieu Trésarrieu |
| 4 | 3 September | (France) Morizès | (France) Mathieu Trésarrieu |
| 5 | 10 September | (Germany) Vechta | (United Kingdom) Zach Wajtknecht |
| 6 | 25 September | (Netherlands) Roden | (United Kingdom) Zach Wajtknecht |

== Final classification ==
| Pos | Rider | Round 1 | Round 2 | Round 3 | Round 4 | Round 5 | Round 6 | Total |
|---|---|---|---|---|---|---|---|---|
| 1 | (France) Mathieu Trésarrieu | 15 | 21 | 21 | 21 | 19 | 19 | 116 |
| 2 | (United Kingdom) Zach Wajtknecht | 9 | 5 | 13 | 19 | 21 | 21 | 88 |
| 3 | (United Kingdom) Chris Harris | 17 | 19 | 8 | 13 | 15 | 11 | 83 |
| 4 | (Germany) Lukas Fienhage | 5 | 13 | 15 | 17 | 17 | 15 | 82 |
| 5 | (Netherlands) Romano Hummel | 1 | 17 | 19 | 15 | 0 | 17 | 69 |
| 6 | (Netherlands) Theo Pijper | 11 | 10 | 11 | 11 | 10 | 8 | 61 |
| 7 | (Denmark) Kenneth Kruse Hansen | 21 | 11 | x | x | x | 13 | 45+ |
| 8 | (Czech Republic) Hynek Štichauer | 8 | 8 | 7 | 10 | 3 | 9 | 45 |
| 9 | (Denmark) Jakub Bukhave | 4 | 9 | 17 | 3 | 5 | 4 | 42 |
| 10 | (Poland) Stanisław Burza | 19 | 2 | 4 | 4 | 11 | 1 | 41 |
| 11 | (Netherlands) Mika Meijer | 3 | 5 | 7 | 9 | x | 3 | 27 |
| 12 | (Germany) Jörg Tebbe | 3 | x | 10 | 2 | x | 7 | 22 |
| 13 | (Czech Republic) Martin Málek | 13 | 7 | x | x | x | x | 20 |
| 13 | (France) Julien Cayre | x | x | 2 | 8 | 8 | 2 | 20 |
| 15 | (Finland) Tero Aarnio | 10 | x | 9 | x | x | x | 19 |
| 16 | (Netherlands) Dave Meijerink | x | x | x | x | 13 | 5 | 18 |
| 17 | (Germany) Stephan Katt | x | 15 | 0 | x | x | x | 15 |
| 18 | (United Kingdom) James Shanes | 7 | 4 | x | x | x | x | 11 |
| 19 | (Netherlands) Jannick de Jong | x | x | x | x | x | 10 | 10 |
| 20 | (France) Stéphane Trésarrieu | x | x | x | 9 | x | x | 9 |
| 21 | (Germany) Daniel Spiller | x | x | x | x | 7 | x | 7 |
| 22 | (France) Mathias Trésarrieu | x | x | x | 5 | x | x | 5 |
| 23 | (United Kingdom) Jake Mulford | x | x | x | x | 4 | x | 4 |
| 24 | (Netherlands) Henry van der Steen | x | x | 3 | x | x | x | 3 |
| 25 | (Netherlands) William Kruit | x | x | x | x | 2 | x | 2 |
| 25 | (Germany) Fabian Wachs | x | x | 1 | x | 1 | x | 2 |
| 25 | (Poland) Marcin Sekulla | 2 | x | x | x | x | x | 2 |
| 28 | (France) Jordan Dubernard | x | x | x | 1 | x | x | 1 |
| 28 | (United Kingdom) Charley Powell | x | 1 | x | x | x | x | 1 |
| 30 | (Finland) Jens Benneker | x | x | x | x | 0 | x | 0 |

+ won run off for 7th place
