= 1974 Individual Long Track World Championship =

Long track motorcycle racing event

The 1974 Individual Long Track World Championship was the fourth edition of the FIM speedway Individual Long Track World Championship. The event was held on 8 September 19743 in Scheeßel, West Germany.

The defending champion Ole Olsen was unable to defend his title because of an injury suffered during the 1974 Individual Speedway World Championship, two days previous. The world title was won by Egon Müller of West Germany.

== Final Classification ==
Pos	Rider	Heat Pts	Heat Pts	Heat Pts	Heat Pts	Heat Pts	Total Pts
1	(West Germany) Egon Müller	6	6	6	6	6	30
2	(New Zealand) Ivan Mauger	4	6	6	6	4	26
3	(West Germany) Alois Wiesböck	6	6	4	4	1	21
4	(Sweden) Anders Michanek	3	2	4	3	3	15
5	(West Germany) Josef Angermüller	3	4	2	2	2	13
6	(England) Don Godden	6	3	4	0	0	13
7	(England) Peter Collins	1	3	3	4	E	11
8	(Norway) Jon Ødegaard	4	4	1	2	E	11
9	(West Germany) Manfred Poschenreider	3	4	2	1	E	10
10	(Denmark) Preben Bollerup	4	3	2	0	E	9
11	(Czechoslovakia) Jiří Štancl	2	1	3	3	E	9
12	(West Germany) Christoph Betzl	x	1	6	1	E	8
13	(Denmark) Preben Rosenkilde	2	2	1	E	E	5
14	(Czechoslovakia) Milan Špinka	1	0	3	E	E	4
15	(West Germany) Hans Zierk	2	-	1	E	E	3
16	(Czechoslovakia) Stanislav Kubíček	0	2	0	E	E	2
17	(West Germany) Cord Heinrich Hoft	-	1	0	E	E	1
18	(Norway) Edgar Stangeland	0	0	-	E	E	0
19	(West Germany) Bernd Broker	-	-	0	E	E	0
20	(West Germany) Gottfried Schwarze	f	-	-	E	E	0

Key

- E = Eliminated (no further ride)
- F = Fell
- E/F = Engine Failure
