= 1973 Individual Long Track World Championship =

Long track motorcycle racing event

The 1973 Individual Long Track World Championship was the third edition of the FIM speedway Individual Long Track World Championship. The event was held on 20 September 1973 in Oslo, Norway. The defending champion Ivan Mauger failed to qualify for the semi-final round after being eliminated in a qualifying round. The world title was won by Ole Olsen of Denmark.

== Final Classification ==
Pos	Rider	Heat Pts	Heat Pts	Heat Pts	Heat Pts	Heat Pts	Total Pts
1	(Denmark) Ole Olsen	4	5	5	5	5	24
2	(West Germany) Hans Siegl	5	5	5	5	0	20
3	(West Germany) Manfred Poschenreider	5	4	4	4	3	20
4	(England) Don Godden	2	5	4	4	4	19
5	(West Germany) Jan Kater	4	4	2	3	2	15
6	(West Germany) Josef Angermüller	5	3	3	3	1	15
7	(Sweden) Runo Wedin	3	3	4	1	E	11
8	(Sweden) Willihard Thomsson	3	4	2	2	E	11
9	(West Germany) Egon Müller	2	3	5	0	E	10
10	(Czechoslovakia) Milan Špinka	4	2	1	0	E	7
11	(Sweden) Sture Lindblom	3	1	1	2	E	7
12	(Norway) Einar Egedius	1	1	3	1	E	6
13	(Czechoslovakia) Zdeněk Majstr	-	-	3	E	E	3
14	(Sweden) Berndt Hornfeldt	1	2	0	E	E	3
15	(Denmark) Bent Nørregaard-Jensen	0	-	2	E	E	2
16	(Norway) Jon Ødegaard	-	0	-	E	E	0
17	(Sweden) Conny Samuelsson	-	0	-	E	E	0
18	(Finland) Hakan Storm	0	-	-	E	E	0

Key

- E = Eliminated (no further ride)
