= 1961 Individual Long Track European Championship =

Motorcycle racing competition

1961 Long Track European Championship

The 1961 Individual Long Track European Championship was the fifth edition of the Long Track European Championship. The final was held on 7 September 1961 in Oslo, Norway.

The title was won by Timo Laine of Finland.

== Venues ==
- qualifying rounds - Marianske Lazne, 14 May 1961
- 1st semi-final - Scheeßel, 4 June 1961
- Semi Final - Mühldorf am Inn, 11 June 1961
- Scandinavian final - Örebro, 18 June 1961
- Final - Oslo, 7 September 1961

== Final Classification ==
Pos	Rider	Pts
1	(Finland) Timo Laine	24
2	(Sweden) Ove Fundin	20
3	(Norway) Erling Simonsen	21
4	(West Germany) Manfred Poschenreider	23
5	(Sweden) Agnar Stenlund	19
6	(Norway) Rolf Westerberg	16
7	(Finland) Kauko Jousanen	18
8	(Finland) Antti Pajari	16
9	(Finland) Aulis Tuominen	14
10	(Norway) Egil Bratvold	12
11	(Sweden) Sven Fahlén	12
12	(Sweden) Bert Lindarw	12
13	(West Germany) Alfred Dannmeyer	10
14	(West Germany) Hermann Viets	8
15	(Sweden) Rune Sörmander	7
16	(Sweden) Roger Steen	6
17	(Norway) Odvar Kristiansen	6
18	(Sweden) Bertil Stridh	0
