= 1960 Individual Long Track European Championship =

Motorcycle racing competition

1960 Long Track European Championship

The 1960 Individual Long Track European Championship was the fourth edition of the Long Track European Championship. The final was held on 17 July 1960 in Plattling, West Germany.

The title was won by Josef Hofmeister of West Germany for the second time.

== Venues ==
- 1st semi-final - Marianske Lazne, May 29, 1960
- 2nd semi-final - Riihimäki, 5 June 1960
- Final - Plattling, July 17, 1960

== Final Classification ==
Pos	Rider	Pts
1	(West Germany) Josef Hofmeister	24
2	(West Germany) Josef Seidl	17
3	(West Germany) Josef Sinzinger	21
4	(Sweden) Sven Fahlén	12
5	(Czechoslovakia) František Richter	12
6	(Finland) Antti Pajari	14
7	(Finland) Kalevi Lahtinen	16
8	(West Germany) Alfred Aberl	16
9	(Sweden) Olle Nygren	12
10	(Finland) Aulis Tuominen	12
11	(Norway) Thore Melbye	10
12	(West Germany) Walter Gernert	10
13	(Czechoslovakia) Jaroslav Volf	10
14	(Czechoslovakia) Jaroslav Machač	5
15	(Norway) Egil Bratvold	3
16	(East Germany) Hans Zierk	0
17	(Finland) Kauko Jousanen	0
18	(Sweden) Bertil Stridh	0
