= 2013 FIM Long Track World Championship =

Motorcycle racing competition

2013 Individual Long Track World Championship

The 2013 Individual Long Track/Grasstrack World Championship was the 43rd edition of the FIM speedway Individual Long Track World Championship.

The world title was won by Joonas Kylmäkorpi of Finland for the fourth consecutive year.

== Venues ==
| Round | Date | Venue |
|---|---|---|
| 1 | 8 Jun | (Finland) Forssa |
| 2 | 15 Jun | (Norway) Forus |
| 3 | 13 Jul | (France) Marmande |
| 4 | 10 Aug | (Poland) Rzeszów |
| 5 | 7 Sep | (Germany) Vechta |
| 6 | 14 Sep | (France) Morizès |

== Final Classification ==
| Pos | Rider | Round 1 | Round 2 | Round 3 | Round 4 | Round 5 | Round 6 | Total Pts |
|---|---|---|---|---|---|---|---|---|
| 1 | (Finland) Joonas Kylmäkorpi | 25 | 28 | 14 | 18 | 23 | 18 | 126 |
| 2 | (Netherlands) Jannick de Jong | 21 | 16 | 24 | 8 | 20 | 9 | 97 |
| 3 | (England) Richard Hall | 12 | 16 | 26 | 16 | 13 | 13 | 96 |
| 4 | (Czech Republic) Josef Franc | 26 | 14 | 14 | 20 | 10 | 7 | 91 |
| 5 | (Australia) Cameron Woodward | 9 | 18 | 11 | 20 | 22 | 10 | 90 |
| 6 | (Germany) Jörg Tebbe | 19 | 22 | 10 | 12 | 7 | 12 | 82 |
| 7 | (Germany) Richard Speiser | 9 | 15 | 9 | 15 | 20 | 13 | 81 |
| 8 | (France) Mathieu Tresarrieu | 9 | 13 | 10 | 18 | 15 | 20 | 81 |
| 9 | (Germany) Martin Smolinski | 16 | 15 | x | 23 | 23 | x | 77 |
| 10 | (Netherlands) Dirk Fabriek | 9 | 11 | 19 | 8 | 11 | 17 | 75 |
| 11 | (France) Stephane Tresarrieu | 11 | 11 | 11 | 10 | 9 | 23 | 75 |
| 12 | (Finland) Aki Pekka Mustonen | 11 | 20 | 6 | 8 | 10 | 7 | 62 |
| 13 | (Germany) Stephan Katt | 7 | 2 | 15 | 9 | 14 | 9 | 56 |
| 14 | (Netherlands) Theo Pijper | 5 | 6 | 4 | 9 | 8 | 20 | 52 |
| 15 | (England) David Howe | 15 | 5 | 17 | 9 | x | x | 46 |
| 16 | (England) Glen Phillips | 9 | 5 | 12 | 6 | 5 | 9 | 46 |
| 17 | (Germany) Matthias Kröger | 11 | 3 | 9 | 3 | 6 | 5 | 37 |
| 18 | (France) Jerome Lespinasse | x | x | 10 | x | x | 12 | 22 |
| 19 | (Czech Republic) Richard Wolff | 4 | 14 | 3 | 0 | x | x | 16 |
| 20 | (France) Theo Di Palma | x | x | 5 | x | 7 | 4 | 16 |
| 21 | (Poland) Stanisław Burza | x | x | x | 15 | x | x | 15 |
| 22 | (France) Dimitri Bergé | x | x | x | x | x | 11 | 11 |
| 23 | (Sweden) Joel Nyström | 0 | 5 | 0 | 3 | 0 | x | 8 |
| 24 | (France) Richard Di Biasi | x | x | x | x | x | 7 | 7 |
| 25 | (Germany) Erik Riss | x | x | x | x | 4 | x | 4 |
| 26 | (Netherlands) Nick Lourens | x | x | x | x | 3 | x | 3 |
| 27 | (Finland) Aarni Heikkila | 2 | x | x | x | x | x | 2 |
| 28 | (France) Philippe Ostyn | x | x | x | x | x | 2 | 2 |
| 29 | (Norway) Inge Berge | x | 1 | x | x | x | x | 1 |
