= Martin Smolinski =

German speedway rider (born 1984)

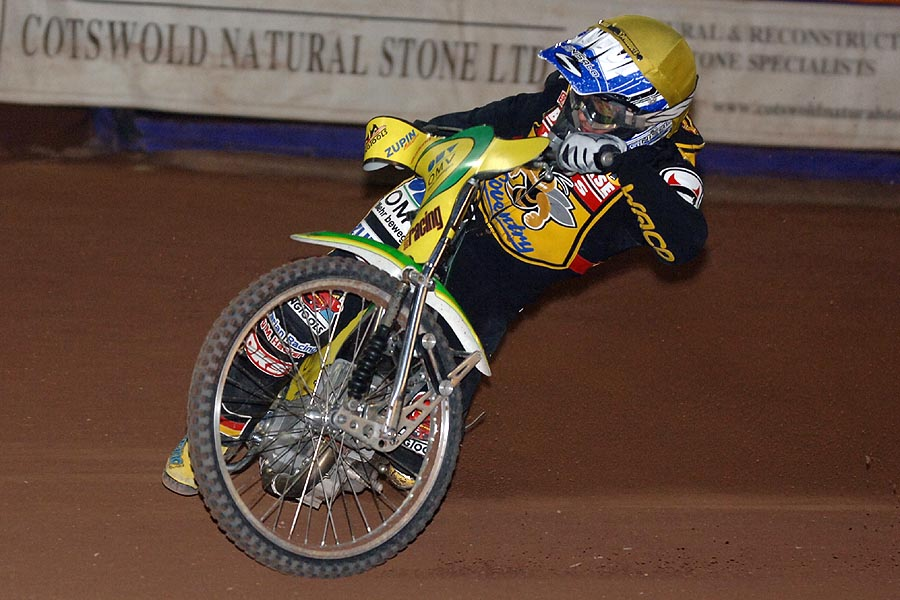
- Smolinski riding for Coventry in 2007
- Born: 6 December 1984 (age 41); Munich, West Germany
- Nationality: German

Career history

Germany
- 1999–2008: MSC Olching
- 2010–2012, 2021–2023: AC Landshut

Poland
- 2006–2007: Rybnik
- 2008: Grudziądz
- 2008, 2013: Krosno
- 2009: Toruń
- 2011: Gniezno
- 2017: Lublin
- 2019: Zielona Góra

Sweden
- 2007–2008, 2010, 2013: Hammarby
- 2020-2021: Masarna

Denmark
- 2004: Outrup
- 2007: Slangerup
- 2013, 2017: Grindsted

Great Britain
- 2004–2007, 2009: Coventry
- 2013: Birmingham

Individual honours
- 2018, 2023, 2024: World Longtrack Championship
- 2007, 2009, 2010, 2015, 2016, 2018, 2019, 2021: German Champion
- 2003: German Under-21 Champion
- 2011: European Grasstrack Champion
- 2012, 2013, 2016: German Longtrack champion

Team honours
- 2019, 2023: World Longtrack Team silver
- 2007: Elite League Champion
- 2007: Elite League KO Cup Winner
- 2007: Craven Shield Winner

Martin Smolinski (born 6 December 1984) is a German motorcycle speedway rider. He is three-times world longtrack champion and eight times champion of Germany.

== Personal life ==
Smolinski was born on 6 December 1984 in Munich, West Germany. He is of Polish descent through his paternal grandfather from Katowice which went to Munich during World War II.

== Career ==
Smolinski began riding in his natiove Germany for MSC Olching. He became the German junior champion in 2003 and after reaching the final 2003 Speedway Under-21 World Championship he signed for Coventry Bees in England.

Coventry retained Smolinski for the following two seasons and his form improved over the next two seasons. In 2006, he signed for his first Polish club Rybnik and in 2007 became the German Champion for the first time. Also in 2007, he won the league and cup double with Coventry during the 2007 Elite League speedway season.

Smolinski was a regular team member of the German speedway team at senior level and represented them in the annual Speedway World Cup. In 2010, he won his third German title and began concentrating mainly on Long track. On 14 September 2014, the 390 metre track record was broken by Martin Smolinski who recorded 64.5 sec. The record still stood as of 2024.

Smolinski would win eight German speedway Championships but his finest success came in 2018 when he won the 2018 Individual Long Track World Championship.

In 2019, Smolinski was part of the German team, along with Lukas Fienhage and Max Dilger, that won the silver medal at the 2019 Team Long Track World Championship.

In 2023, Smolinski was part of the German team that competed at the 2023 Speedway World Cup in Poland. He then went on claim a second Individual Long Track World Championship and the silver medal at the 2023 Team Long Track World Championship.

In 2024, Smolinski successfully defended his World Longtrack title, winning three of the five rounds in the process.

== Major results ==
=== Speedway ===
==== Speedway Grand Prix ====
- 2008 Speedway Grand Prix - 31st
- 2014 Speedway Grand Prix - 12th (81 pts) inc New Zealand GP win
- 2016 Speedway Grand Prix - 17th (8 pts)
- 2017 Speedway Grand Prix - 17th (25 pts)
- 2018 Speedway Grand Prix - 32nd (1 pt)
- 2019 Speedway Grand Prix - 26th (1 pt)

==== World team championship ====
- 2003 - 10th place (1 point in Event 1)
- 2004 - 2nd place in Qualifying round 1 (14 points)
- 2005 - 8th place (2 points in Event 2)
- 2006 - 2nd place in Qualifying round 1 (9 points)
- 2007 - 2nd place in Qualifying round 1 (13 points)
- 2008 - 2nd place in Qualifying round 1 (12 points)
- 2009 - 2nd place in Qualifying round 1 (10 points)

==== Other ====
World U-21 World Championship

- 2003 - 15th place (2 points)
- 2004 - 6th place (9 points)
- 2005 - 15th place (2 points)

Team U-21 World Championship

- 2005 - 2nd in Qualifying Round 1 (8 points)

=== Longtrack ===
Grand-Prix Series

Year	GP	Points	Pos	GP Wins
2010	2	23	16	0
2011	6	83	6	2
2012	6	128	2nd	0
2013	5	78	4	1
2014	5	71	5	0
2015	DNC			
2016	1	25	14	0
2017	1	25	16	0
2018	5	109	1st	3
2019	5	113	2nd	2
2020	DNC			
2021	2	30	2nd	1
2022	DNC			
2023	6	106	1st	1
2024	5	96	1st	3

World Longtrack Best Grand-Prix Results

- (Germany) Herxheim bei Landau/Pfalz First 2018, Second 2019
- (France) La Réole First 2019
- (Czech Republic) Mariánské Lázně First 2011
- (France) Marmande First 2011, Third 2012
- (Germany) Mühldorf First 2018, 2019, Second 2016, Third 2014
- (Netherlands) Roden First 2018
- (Poland) Rzeszów First 2013
- (Germany) Vechta Second 2012

World Longtrack Team Championship

- 2010 (France) Morizès (First) 49pts (rode with Matthias Kröger, Stephan Katt, Richard Speiser)
- 2011 (Germany) Scheeßel (First) 56pts (rode with Stephan Katt, Richard Speiser, Jorg Tebbe)
- 2016 (Czech Republic) Mariánské Lázně (Runners-up) 44pts (rode with Michael Hartel, Jorg Tebbe, Stephan Katt)
