= 2017 FIM Long Track World Championship =

Motorcycle racing competition

2017 Individual Long Track World Championship

The 2017 Individual Long Track/Grasstrack World Championship was the 47th edition of the FIM speedway Individual Long Track World Championship.

The world title was won by Mathieu Tresarrieu of France.

== Venues ==
Round	Date	Venue
1	25 May	(Germany) Herxheim
2	17 Jun	(France) La Réole
3	9 Jul	(Germany) Mühldorf
4	20 Aug	(Netherlands) Eenrum
5	2 Sep	(France) Morizès

== Final Classification ==
Pos	Rider	Round 1	Round 2	Round 3	Round 4	Round 5	Total Pts
1	(France) Mathieu Tresarrieu	23	26	20	17	19	105
2	(Germany) Michael Hartel	19	24	23	16	19	101
3	(Czech Republic) Josef Franc	14	5	18	27	22	86
4	(England) James Shanes	13	18	9	24	14	78
5	(Germany) Stephan Katt	18	18	20	9	7	72
6	(Netherlands) Theo Pijper	16	17	13	8	9	63
7	(Netherlands) Romano Hummel	x	x	13	20	23	56
8	(England) Chris Harris	5	5	6	17	17	50
9	(England) Richard Hall	8	16	3	7	11	45
10	(Finland) Jesse Mustonen	x	8	8	14	15	45
11	(Netherlands) Dirk Fabriek	3	13	5	6	5	32
12	(Germany) Jörg Tebbe	10	1	10	5	0	26
13	(Czech Republic) Hynek Štichauer	16	2	x	4	4	26
14	(France) Stephane Tresarrieu	x	15	x	x	10	25
15	(Netherlands) Jannick de Jong	24	x	x	x	x	24
16	(Germany) Martin Smolinski	x	x	24	x	x	24
17	(England) Glen Phillips	5	4	6	4	5	24
18	(France) Theo di Palmer	0	6	2	1	x	9
19	(Germany) Max Dilger	6	x	x	x	x	6
20	(France) Jerome Lespoinasse	x	1	x	x	x	1
21	(France) Gabriel Dubernard	x	1	x	x	x	1
