= 1971 Individual Long Track World Championship =

Speedway event in Oslo, Norway

The 1971 Individual Long Track World Championship was the first edition of the FIM speedway Individual Long Track World Championship. The event was held on 1 September 1971 in Oslo, Norway.

The world title was won by Ivan Mauger of New Zealand.

== Final Classification ==
Pos	Rider	Heat Pts	Heat Pts	Heat Pts	Heat Pts	Heat Pts	Total Pts
1	(New Zealand) Ivan Mauger	6	6	6	3	6	27
2	(West Germany) Manfred Poschenrieder	6	6	6	4	4	26
3	(Sweden) Runo Wedin	6	6	3	6	2	23
4	(West Germany) Jan Kater	4	2	0	6	3	15
5	(Denmark) Bent Nørregaard-Jensen	3	3	2	3	1	12
6	(New Zealand) Barry Briggs	3	3	-	4	0	10
7	(England) Don Godden	0	4	4	2	E	10
8	(West Germany) Hans Siegl	4	3	1	1	E	9
9	(Sweden) Sven Sigurd	4	2	1	2	E	9
10	(Sweden) Willihard Thomsson	2	4	3	0	E	9
11	(West Germany) Josef Unterholzner	2	1	4	1	E	8
12	(Denmark) Kurt W. Petersen	3	2	2	-	E	7
13	(Sweden) Berndt Hornfeldt	2	4	0	E	E	6
14	(Denmark) Jan Holm Nielsen	1	1	4	E	E	6
15	(Norway) Jon Ødegaard	-	-	6	E	E	6
16	(West Germany) Walter Matl	-	1	3	E	E	4
17	(Finland) Reijo Koski	1	0	2	E	E	3
18	(West Germany) Hans Zierk	-	-	-	E	E	0

Key

- E = Eliminated (no further ride)
