= 1958 Individual Long Track European Championship =

Motorcycle racing competition

1958 Long Track European Championship

The 1958 Individual Long Track European Championship was the second edition of the Long Track European Championship. The event was held on 15 June 1958 in Mühldorf, West Germany.

The title was won by Josef Hofmeister of West Germany.

== Venues ==
- 1st semi-final - Stockholm, 18 May 1958
- 2nd semi-final - Scheeßel, 8 June 1958
- Final - Mühldorf, 15 June 1958

== Final Classification ==
Pos	Rider	Pts
1	(West Germany) Josef Hofmeister	21
2	(Finland) Aulis Tuominen	16
3	(Austria) Josef Kamper	24
4	(Finland) Kauko Jousanen	21
5	(Finland) Antti Pajari	18
6	(Sweden) Valter Persson	17
7	(Sweden) Tage Nyholm	6
8	(Sweden) Sven Fahlén	16
9	(Norway) Erling Simonsen	12
10	(West Germany) Josef Seidl	12
11	(East Germany) Hans Zierk	12
12	(Sweden) Birger Forsberg	10
13	(Netherlands) Tony Kroeze	8
14	(Sweden) Olle Nygren	7
15	(Norway) Roger Hansen	6
16	(Sweden) Stig Pramberg	5
17	(Poland) Adolf Slabon	1
18	(Norway) Basse Hveem	0
