= Miloslav Verner =

Czech speedway rider (1938–2018)

- Born: 25 June 1938; Czechoslovakia
- Died: 18 December 2018 (aged 80)
- Nationality: Czech

Career history

Czechoslovakia

Individual honours
- 1970: World Longtrack finalist
- 1971: Czechoslovak Championship bronze medal

Team honours
- 1970: World Team Cup finalist

Miloslav Verner also known as Mila Verner (25 June 1938 – 18 December 2018) was a Czech motorcycle speedway rider.

== Speedway career ==
Like many Czech riders of the time, the Czechoslovak authorities rarely allowed riders to compete for British league teams but they did allow club sides such as Prague to tour the United Kingdom, which allowed Verner to race in Britain in 1967 and again in 1971.

Verner won the bronze medal in the 1971 Czechoslovak Individual Speedway Championship. He also reached the final of the Individual Speedway Long Track World Championship in 1970.

Verner was also part of the Czechoslovak team that reached the final of the 1970 Speedway World Team Cup.

On 24 March 1973, Verner set a new track record at the Letňa Avia, in Čakovice of 1:13.2.

== World Final appearances ==
=== World Team Cup ===
- 1970 - (England) London, Wembley Stadium (with Zdeněk Majstr / Jiří Štancl / Václav Verner / Jan Holub) – 4th – 3pts (0)

=== World Longtrack Championship ===
- 1970 – (West Germany) Scheeßel (13th) 6pts

== Family ==
Verner's nephews Jan and Václav and his grandson Filip Šitera were also international speedway riders.
