= Edgar Stangeland =

Norwegian speedway rider

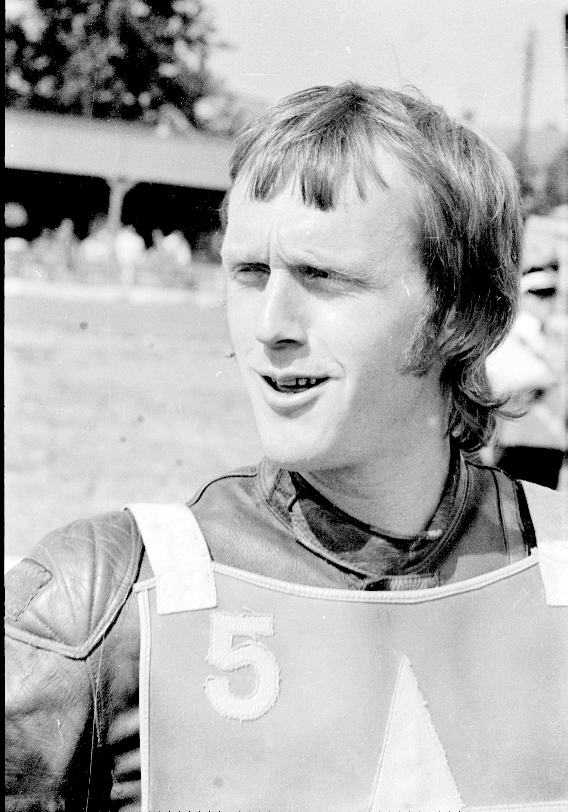
- Born: 22 July 1945 (age 81); Sandnes, Norway
- Nationality: Norwegian

Career history
- 1970, 1971: Newport Wasps
- 1972: Exeter Falcons
- 1973-1975: Swindon Robins
- 1975-1977: Wimbledon Dons
- 1977: Bristol Bulldogs
- 1978, 1979: Wolverhampton Wolves

Individual honours
- 1976: Norwegian Championship

Edgar Stangeland (born 22 July 1945) is a Norwegian former motorcycle speedway rider. He earned ten caps for the Norway national speedway team.

== Speedway career ==
Stangeland is a former champion of Norway, winning the Norwegian Individual Speedway Championship in 1976.

Stangeland was also a two-time finalist at the Individual Speedway Long Track World Championship in 1974 and 1976.

Stangeland rode in the top tier of British Speedway from 1970 until 1979, riding for Newport Wasps, Exeter Falcons, Swindon Robins, Wimbledon Dons, Bristol Bulldogs and Wolverhampton Wolves.

== World final appearances ==
=== World Longtrack Championship ===
- 1974 – (Germany) Scheeßel 18th 0pts
- 1976 – (Czech Republic) Mariánské Lázně 16th 3pts
