= Josef Angermüller =

German speedway rider (1949–1977)

- Born: 6 November 1949; Osseltshausen, Wolnzach, West Germany
- Died: 24 April 1977 (aged 27); Civitanova Marche, Ancona, Italy
- Nationality: German

Career history

West Germany
- 19??: Ruhpolding
- 19??: Olching

Great Britain
- 1971: Reading Racers
- 1974: Hull Vikings

Individual honours
- 1973: West German champion

Josef "Seppi" Angermüller (6 November 1949 – 24 April 1977) was a West German international motorcycle speedway and Long track motorcycle racing rider. He earned 14 international caps for the West German national speedway team.

== Speedway career ==
Angermüller was predominantly known as a Long track speedway rider, where he rode in four finals from 1972 to 1976. He was however, the West German champion in 1973 and was the first German rider to secure a contract in the British League, riding for the Reading Racers in 1971. He had been in talks with Halifax Dukes about signing for the 1972 season but went into hospital for a cartilage operation, which ended the talks.

Angermüller later rode for Hull Vikings in 1974.

In the German Bundesliga, Angermüller rode for MSC Ruhpolding and MSC Olching.

== Death ==
Angermüller died 24 April 1977 after falling in a 1977 Individual Speedway World Championship qualifying round at the San Savino Speedway Park in Civitanova Marche, Italy.

== See also ==
Rider deaths in motorcycle speedway

== World Longtrack Championship ==
- 1972 – (West Germany) Mühldorf (8th) 11pts
- 1973 – (Norway) Oslo (6th) 15pts
- 1974 – (Germany) Scheeßel (5th) 13pts
- 1976 – (Socialist Federal Republic of Yugoslavia) Gornja Radgona (9th) 9pts
