= 1975 Individual Long Track World Championship =

Motorcycle racing event in Yugoslavia

The 1975 Individual Long Track World Championship was the fifth edition of the FIM speedway Individual Long Track World Championship. The event was held on 14 September 1975 in Gornja Radgona, Slovenia which was Yugoslavia at the time.

The world title was won by Egon Müller of West Germany for a second time.

== Final Classification ==
Pos	Rider	Heat Pts	Heat Pts	Heat Pts	Heat Pts	Heat Pts	Total Pts
1	(West Germany) Egon Müller	3	6	6	6	6	27
2	(New Zealand) Ivan Mauger	2	6	4	6	4	22
3	(Denmark) Ole Olsen	6	6	4	0	3	19
4	(New Zealand) Barry Briggs	6	4	6	3	0	19
5	(West Germany) Christoph Betzl	6	3	3	4	1	17
6	(Sweden) Anders Michanek	3	4	0	4	2	13
7	(West Germany) Hans Wassermann	4	3	3	1	E	11
8	(England) Don Godden	4	2	2	3	E	11
9	(England) Peter Collins	1	4	4	2	E	11
10	(West Germany) Manfred Poschenreider	4	3	2	0	E	9
11	(Czechoslovakia) Jiří Štancl	0	1	6	2	E	9
12	(Czechoslovakia) Václav Verner	2	2	3	1	E	8
13	(West Germany) Hans Zierk	3	1	1	E	E	5
14	(West Germany) Joachim Kall	2	0	2	E	E	4
15	(Socialist Federal Republic of Yugoslavia) Vlado Kocuvan	1	2	1	E	E	4
16	(Sweden) Runo Wedin	1	1	0	E	E	2
17	(Denmark) Kristian Præstbro	0	0	1	E	E	1
18	(Socialist Federal Republic of Yugoslavia) Stefan Kekec	0	0	0	E	E	0

Key

- E = eliminated (no further ride)
