= Kurt W. Petersen =

Danish speedway rider (born 1934)

- Born: 2 December 1934
- Nationality: Danish

Career history

Denmark
- 1958: Amager

Great Britain
- 1961: Norwich Stars

Individual honours
- 1964: Long Track World Champion
- 1967: Nordic Longtrack Champion
- 1960, 1961, 1962, 1963: Danish Champion
- 1959, 1960, 1961 1962, 1963, 1964 1965, 1966, 1967 1968, 1969: Denmark Longtrack Champion

Kurt Wæde Petersen (born 2 December 1934) is a former Motorcycle speedway rider who was a four times champion of Denmark and the 1964 world longtrack champion.

== Speedway career ==
Petersen was a four-time champion of Denmark, winning the Danish Championship in 1960 to 1963.

Petersen competed in nine World Longtrack Championship Finals and became a world champion after winning the 1964. He was the Denmark Longtrack Champion eleven times, in 1959, 1960, 1961, 1962, 1963, 1964, 1965, 1966, 1967, 1968 and 1969.

Petersen rode in the top tier of British Speedway in 1961, riding for Norwich Stars.

== Speedway World Final appearances ==
=== World Longtrack Championship ===
- 1963 (Sweden) Malmö (Second) 16pts
- 1964 (West Germany) Scheeßel (Champion) 15pts
- 1965 (Finland) Seinajoki (10th) 8pts
- 1966 (West Germany) Mühldorf (Second) 16pts
- 1967 (West Germany) Scheeßel (4th) 10pts
- 1968 (West Germany) Mühldorf (Third) 12pts
- 1969 (Norway) Oslo (Third) 11pts
- 1970 (West Germany) Scheeßel (11) 7pts
- 1971 (Norway) Oslo (12th) 7pts

=== Nordic Final ===
- 1961 (Sweden) Malmö (14th) 6pts

=== World Pairs Championship ===
- 1968 - (West Germany) Kempten (with Jens Hauser) - 6th - 6pts (2)
