= 2022 FIM Long Track of Nations =

2022 Speedway event

The 2022 FIM Long Track of Nations was the 14th annual FIM Team Long Track World Championship. The final took place on 26 May 2022 in Herxheim, Germany. The 2020 and 2021 events had been cancelled due to the COVID-19 pandemic.

Germany won the event for the ninth time, with two times individual world champion Erik Riss returning to the longtrack after a long break and gaining the crucial heat win in the final that saw Germany beat the Czech Republic by virtue of the race win. Mathieu Trésarrieu performed superbly for France but was unable to gain the support required from his team.

== Results ==
- (Germany) Herxheim
- 26 May 2022

Pos.	Team	Pts	riders
1	Germany	42+12	Erik Riss 35, Lukas Fienhage 17, Max Dilger 2
2	Czech Republic	42+12	Martin Málek 30, Josef Franc 22, Hynek Štichauer 2
3	France	39+6	Mathieu Trésarrieu 43, Stéphane Trésarrieu 8, Mathias Trésarrieu 6
4	Netherlands	41	Romano Hummel 29, Theo Pijper 23, Dave Meijerink 0
5	Great Britain	38	Zach Wajtknecht 29, James Shanes 5, Chris Harris 4
6	Denmark	22	Kenneth Kruse Hansen 12, Jacob Bukhave 10
7	Poland	12	Stanisław Burza 10, Marcin Sekulla 1, Adam Skórnicki 1
8	Finland	11	Tero Aarnio 5, Henri Ahlbom 4, Max Koivula 2

== See also ==
- 2022 Individual Long Track World Championship
