= Eichenring =

Eichenring may refer to:

- Eichenring Long track speedway near Scheeßel, Germany
- Eichenring speedway track, home to Speedway Wolfslake, Germany
