= 2003 Speedway Under-21 World Championship =

European motorcycle speedway event

World Under-21 Championship
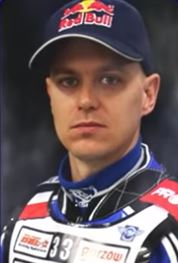
- Jarosław Hampel
- Venue: Kumla Speedway
- Location: Kumla, Sweden
- Start date: 13 September 2003

The 2003 Individual Speedway Junior World Championship was the 27th edition of the World motorcycle speedway Under-21 Championships.

The final was won by Jarosław Hampel of the Poland.

== World final ==
- 13 September 2003
- (Sweden) Kumla Speedway, Kumla

Placing	Rider	Total	1	2	3	4	5	6	7	8	9	10	11	12	13	14	15	16	17	18	19	20	Pts	Pos	21
1	(Poland) (14) Jarosław Hampel	14				3		3					3		3							2	14	1	
2	(England) (10) Chris Harris	13			3			2						3			3		2				13	2	
3	(Poland) (5) Rafał Szombierski	11		2			2					2					2					3	11	4	3
4	(Sweden) (9) Fredrik Lindgren	11			0		3						2					3		3			11	3	2
5	(Slovenia) (12) Matej Žagar	10			2					3		1			1						3		10	5	
6	(Denmark) (15) Niels Kristian Iversen	9				E			3			3						0	3				9	6	
7	(Poland) (16) Rafał Kurmański	8				2				1	3						1			1			8	7	
8	(Denmark) (2) Kenneth Bjerre	7	1					1				E				3				2			7	8	
9	(Sweden) (6) Jonas Davidsson	6		3				0			0							2			1		6	9	
10	(Sweden) (4) Peter Ljung	6	3							2				X				1				0	6	10	
11	(England) (1) David Howe	6	0				1				2				2				1				6	11	
12	(Poland) (11) Robert Miśkowiak	6			1				1		1					2						1	6	12	
13	(England) (13) Jamie Smith	5				1	0							2		0					2		5	13	
14	(United States) (3) Ryan Fisher	4	2						2				E				E				-		4	14	
15	(Germany) (7) Martin Smolinski +	2		1					0					1	0					0			2	15	
16	(England) (8) Oliver Allen	2		E						X			1			1			0				2	16	
R1	(Poland) (R1) Łukasz Romanek	0																			0		0	R1	
Placing	Rider	Total	1	2	3	4	5	6	7	8	9	10	11	12	13	14	15	16	17	18	19	20	Pts	Pos	21

m - exclusion for exceeding two minute time allowance • t - exclusion for touching the tapes • x - other exclusion • e - retired or mechanical failure • f - fell • ns - non-starter • nc - non-classify

gate A - inside	gate B	gate C	gate D - outside

+ Martin Smolinski replaced the injured Krzysztof Kasprzak (3rd in semi-final A).
