= Stig Pramberg =

Swedish motorcycle speedway rider

- Born: 23 April 1921; Lund, Sweden
- Died: 15 September 1996 (aged 75); Degeberga, Sweden
- Nationality: Swedish

Career history
- 1948–1954, 1958–1959: Vargarna
- 1955–1957: Filbyterna

Individual honours
- 1952: Continental final bronze medal

Team honours
- 1949, 1951, 1953, 1954: League champion

Stig Allan Pramberg (23 April 1921 – 15 September 1996) was a motorcycle speedway rider from Sweden. He was a member of the Sweden national speedway team.

== Biography ==
Pramberg won four League championships with Vargarna in 1949, 1951, 1953 and 1954.

During 1950, Pramberg was ranked the number two Swedish rider behind Olle Nygren.

Pramberg also reached the Championship round of the 1952 Individual Speedway World Championship and the 1953 Individual Speedway World Championship, which included a third-place finish in the Continental Speedway final in 1952. It was in 1952, that he also took a role as a speedway rider in a film called Dangerous Curve.

In 1958, Pramberg reached the final of the 1958 Individual Long Track European Championship.
