= FIM Long Track World Championship =

Individual Long Track World Championship medalists

World Longtrack Championship
- Sport: Motorcycle speedway
- Founded: 1957
- Most titles: Gerd Riss (8 times)

This is the complete list of Individual Long Track World Championship medalists from 1971. Also included are the medalists from 1957 to 1970 when the championship was known as the European Individual Long Track Championship.

== Medalists ==
=== European Long Track Championship ===
(*) Shows position was gained after a run-off.

Year	Venue	Winners	Runner-up	3rd place
1957	(Sweden) Solvalla	(Norway) Basse Hveem	(Germany) Josef Hofmeister	(Norway) Eric Brafvold
1958	(Germany) Mühldorf	(Germany) Josef Hofmeister	(Finland) Aulis Tuominen	(Austria) Josef Kamper
1959	(Finland) Käpylä	(Germany) Josef Hofmeister	(Finland) Antti Pajari	(Sweden) Olle Nygren
1960	(Germany) Plattling	(Germany) Josef Hofmeister	(Germany) Josef Seidl	(Germany) Josef Sinzinger
1961	(Norway) Oslo	(Finland) Timo Laine	(Sweden) Ove Fundin	(Norway) Erik Simonsen
1962	(Germany) Mühldorf	(Sweden) Bertil Stridh	(Germany) Josef Seidl	(Finland) Timo Laine
1963	(Sweden) Malmö	(Sweden) Bertil Stridh	(Denmark) Kurt W. Petersen	(Germany) Manfred Poschenreider
1964	(Germany) Scheeßel	(Denmark) Kurt W. Petersen	(Finland) Ollie Turunen	(Germany) Manfred Poschenreider
1965	(Finland) Seinäjoki	(Sweden) Björn Knutson	(Finland) Timo Laine	(Germany) Josef Seidl
1966	(Germany) Mühldorf	(Germany) Manfred Poschenreider	(Denmark) Kurt W. Petersen	(Norway) Jon Ødegaard
1967	(Germany) Scheeßel	(Germany) Manfred Poschenreider	(England) Don Godden	(Norway) Jon Ødegaard
1968	(Germany) Mühldorf	(Germany) Manfred Poschenreider	(England) Don Godden	(Denmark) Kurt W. Petersen
1969	(Norway) Oslo	(England) Don Godden	(Norway) Jon Ødegaard	(Denmark) Kurt W. Petersen
1970	(Germany) Scheeßel	(Norway) Jon Ødegaard	(England) Don Godden	(Germany) Hans Zierk

=== World Long Track Championship ===
Year	Venue	Winners	Runner-up	3rd place
1971	(Norway) Oslo	(New Zealand) Ivan Mauger	(Germany) Manfred Poschenreider	(Sweden) Runo Wedin
1972	(West Germany) Mühldorf	(New Zealand) Ivan Mauger	(Germany) Manfred Poschenreider	(Norway) Jon Ødegaard
1973	(Norway) Oslo	(Denmark) Ole Olsen	(Germany) Hans Siegl	(Germany) Manfred Poschenreider
1974	(West Germany) Scheeßel	(Germany) Egon Müller	(New Zealand) Ivan Mauger	(Germany) Alois Wiesböck
1975	(Socialist Federal Republic of Yugoslavia) Gornja Radgona	(Germany) Egon Müller	(New Zealand) Ivan Mauger	(Denmark) Ole Olsen
1976	(Czech Republic) Mariánské Lázně	(New Zealand) Ivan Mauger	(Denmark) Ole Olsen	(Germany) Egon Müller
1977	(Denmark) Aalborg	(Sweden) Anders Michanek	(Germany) Hans Siegl	(Denmark) Ole Olsen
1978	(West Germany) Mühldorf	(Germany) Egon Müller	(Germany) Alois Wiesböck	(England) Peter Collins(*)
1979	(Czech Republic) Mariánské Lázně	(Germany) Alois Wiesböck	(Sweden) Anders Michanek	(Denmark) Ole Olsen
1980	(West Germany) Scheeßel	(Germany) Karl Maier	(Germany) Egon Müller	(Germany) Josef Aigner (Germany) Christoph Betzl
1981	(Socialist Federal Republic of Yugoslavia) Gornja Radgona	(England) Michael Lee	(Germany) Christoph Betzl	(Sweden) Anders Michanek(*)
1982	(Denmark) Korskro	(Germany) Karl Maier	(Germany) Alois Wiesböck	(Germany) Egon Müller
1983	(Czech Republic) Mariánské Lázně	(United States) Shawn Moran	(Czech Republic) Jiří Štancl	(Germany) Karl Maier
1984	(West Germany) Herxheim	(Denmark) Erik Gundersen	(Germany) Egon Müller	(Germany) Karl Maier
1985	(Denmark) Korskro	(England) Simon Wigg	(Czech Republic) Jiří Štancl	(England) Peter Collins
1986	(West Germany) Pfarrkirchen	(Denmark) Erik Gundersen	(England) Peter Collins(*)	(Switzerland) Marcel Gerhard
1987	(West Germany) Mühldorf	(Germany) Karl Maier	(England) Simon Wigg	(United States) Shawn Moran(*)
1988	(West Germany) Scheeßel	(Germany) Karl Maier	(Germany) Klaus Lausch	(England) Chris Morton
1989	(Czech Republic) Mariánské Lázně	(England) Simon Wigg	(Czech Republic) Aleš Dryml Sr.	(Germany) Karl Maier
1990	(Germany) Herxheim	(England) Simon Wigg	(Germany) Karl Maier(*)	(Germany) Hans Pingel
1991	(Czech Republic) Mariánské Lázně	(Germany) Gerd Riss	(Czech Republic) Aleš Dryml Sr.(*)	(Denmark) Jan O. Pedersen
1992	(Germany) Pfarrkirchen	(Switzerland) Marcel Gerhard	(New Zealand) Mitch Shirra	(Germany) Karl Maier
1993	(Germany) Mühldorf	(England) Simon Wigg	(Germany) Karl Maier	(Switzerland) Marcel Gerhard(*)
1994	(Czech Republic) Mariánské Lázně	(England) Simon Wigg	(Germany) Andre Pollehn	(Germany) Gerd Riss(*)
1995	(Germany) Scheeßel	(England) Kelvin Tatum(*)	(England) Simon Wigg	(Germany) Walter Scherwitzki
1996	(Germany) Herxheim	(Germany) Gerd Riss	(Germany) Robert Barth	(Germany) Bernd Diener

=== Grand Prix Series (since 1997) ===
Year	Venues	Winners	Runner-up	3rd place
1997 details	five events	(Germany) Tommy Dunker	(England) Steve Schofield	(England) Glenn Cunningham
1998 details	five events	(England) Kelvin Tatum	(Germany) Gerd Riss	(England) Steve Schofield
1999 details	five events	(Germany) Gerd Riss	(Germany) Robert Barth	(England) Kelvin Tatum
2000 details	five events	(England) Kelvin Tatum	(Germany) Robert Barth	(Germany) Matthias Kröger
2001 details	four events	(Germany) Gerd Riss	(England) Kelvin Tatum	(Germany) Robert Barth
2002 details	five events	(Germany) Robert Barth	(Germany) Gerd Riss	(England) Kelvin Tatum
2003 details	six events	(Germany) Robert Barth	(England) Kelvin Tatum	(Germany) Gerd Riss
2004 details	five events	(Germany) Gerd Riss	(England) Kelvin Tatum	(Germany) Bernd Diener
2005 details	nine events	(Germany) Robert Barth	(Germany) Gerd Riss	(England) Paul Hurry
2006 details	five events	(Germany) Robert Barth	(Finland) Joonas Kylmäkorpi	(Germany) Gerd Riss
2007 details	three events	(Germany) Gerd Riss	(Finland) Joonas Kylmäkorpi	(France) Mathieu Trésarrieu
2008 details	four events	(Germany) Gerd Riss	(England) Glen Phillips	(Netherlands) Dirk Fabriek
2009 details	five events	(Germany) Gerd Riss	(France) Stephane Tresarrieu	(Netherlands) Dirk Fabriek
2010 details	six events	(Finland) Joonas Kylmäkorpi	(Netherlands) Theo Pijper	(Germany) Richard Speiser
2011 details	six events	(Finland) Joonas Kylmäkorpi	(Germany) Richard Speiser	(Germany) Stephan Katt
2012 details	six events	(Finland) Joonas Kylmäkorpi	(Germany) Martin Smolinski	(Czech Republic) Josef Franc
2013 details	six events	(Finland) Joonas Kylmäkorpi	(Netherlands) Jannick de Jong	(England) Richard Hall
2014 details	five events	(Germany) Erik Riss	(Netherlands) Jannick de Jong	(Finland) Joonas Kylmäkorpi
2015 details	four events	(Netherlands) Jannick de Jong	(Germany) Erik Riss	(France) Dimitri Bergé
2016 details	five events	(Germany) Erik Riss	(Netherlands) Jannick de Jong	(France) Mathieu Trésarrieu
2017 details	five events	(France) Mathieu Trésarrieu	(Germany) Michael Hartel	(Czech Republic) Josef Franc
2018 details	five events	(Germany) Martin Smolinski	(France) Dimitri Bergé	(France) Mathieu Trésarrieu
2019 details	five events	(France) Dimitri Bergé	(Germany) Martin Smolinski	(France) Mathieu Trésarrieu
2020 details	two events	(Germany) Lukas Fienhage	(Denmark) Kenneth Kruse Hansen	(France) Mathieu Trésarrieu
2021 details	four events	(Netherlands) Romano Hummel	(Germany) Martin Smolinski	(Netherlands) Theo Pijper
2022 details	six events	(France) Mathieu Trésarrieu	(England) Zach Wajtknecht	(England) Chris Harris
2023 details	six events	(Germany) Martin Smolinski	(England) Chris Harris	(Denmark) Kenneth Kruse Hansen
2024 details	five events	(Germany) Martin Smolinski	(Germany) Lukas Fienhage	(England) Zach Wajtknecht
2025 details	four events	(England) Zach Wajtknecht	(England) Chris Harris	(Germany) Lukas Fienhage
2026 details	three events	(Germany) Erik Riss	(Netherlands) Dave Meijerink	(England) Chris Harris

== Classification ==
Classification from the start of the World Long Track Championship in 1971.

No.	Rider	Nationality
1.	Gerd Riss	Germany	8	3	3
2.	Simon Wigg	England	5	2
3.	Robert Barth	Germany	4	3	1
4.	Karl Maier	Germany	4	2	4
5.	Joonas Kylmäkorpi	Finland	4	2	1
6.	Kelvin Tatum	England	3	3	2
7.	Martin Smolinski	Germany	3	3
8.	Egon Müller	Germany	3	2	2
9.	Ivan Mauger	New Zealand	3	2
10.	Erik Riss	Germany	3	1
11.	Mathieu Trésarrieu	France	2		5
12.	Erik Gundersen	Denmark	2
13.	Jannick de Jong	Netherlands	1	3
14.	Alois Wiesböck	Germany	1	2	1
15.	Ole Olsen	Denmark	1	1	3
16.	Anders Michanek	Sweden	1	1	1
	Lukas Fienhage	Germany	1	1	1
	Zach Wajtknecht	England	1	1	1
19.	Marcel Gerhard	Switzerland	1		2
20.	Shawn Moran	United States	1		1
21.	Michael Lee	England	1
	Tommy Dunker	Germany	1
	Romano Hummel	Netherlands	1

== Records ==
- Most Appearances in Final: Gerd Riss 25.
- Most Overall Points: Theo Pijper 1369.
- Most One Day Finals: Egon Müller 20.
- Most One Day Points: Karl Maier 329.
- Most Grand-Prix Series Appearances: Theo Pijper 24.
- Most Grand-Prix Appearances: Theo Pijper 104.
- Most Grand-Prix Points: Theo Pijper 1369.
- Most Grand-Prix Podiums Mathieu Trésarrieu 34.
- Most Grand-Prix Wins Gerd Riss & Joonas Kylmäkorpi 16

Records up to date and including the 2023 Grand Prix series.

== See also ==
- Motorcycle speedway
- Team Long Track World Championship
