= Erik Riss =

German speedway and grasstrack rider (born 1995)

- Born: 13 September 1995 (age 31); Memmingen, Germany
- Nationality: German
- Website: official website

Career history

Germany
- 2012: Herxheim

Poland
- 2022, 2024–2025: Landshut

Great Britain
- 2015–2018: Edinburgh Monarchs
- 2017: Leicester Lions
- 2018–2021: King's Lynn Stars
- 2019–2020, 2022–2023, 2025: Redcar Bears
- 2021: Birmingham Brummies
- 2022–2023: Ipswich Witches
- 2024–2025: Oxford Spires

Denmark
- 2016: Slangerup
- 2021: Nordjysk

Speedway Grand Prix statistics
- Starts: 1
- Finalist: 0 times
- Winner: 0 times

Individual honours
- 2014, 2016: World Longtrack Champion
- 2014: German Longtrack Champion
- 2016, 2024: German Speedway Champion
- 2019: Championship Riders' title

Team honours
- 2014, 2022, 2024: World Longtrack Team Champion
- 2023: KO Cup (tier 1)
- 2015: Premier League (tier 2)
- 2019: KO Cup (tier 2)
- 2022, 2025: Pairs (tier 2)
- 2015: Fours (tier 2)
- 2015: Premier League Cup (tier 2)

Erik Riss (born 13 September 1995) is a German speedway, longtrack and grasstrack rider, who won the World Longtrack Championship in 2014 and 2016, and was German speedway champion in 2016.

== Career ==
Born in Memmingen, Germany, the son of former rider Gerd Riss and younger brother of Mark Riss, Erik Riss began his speedway career in 2012 and rode in his home country for Automobilclub Landshut from 2013, also riding in Germany for MSV Herxheim and AMC Memmingen.

Riss first had success in long track, winning the German championship in 2014. Later that year, at 19, he became the youngest rider ever to win the world championship. In the same year, he was part of the German teams that won the World Longtrack Team Championship and finished fourth in the European Junior Team Championship.

In 2015, Riss began his British speedway career in the Premier League with Edinburgh Monarchs, with whom he won the League Cup, Premier League Four-Team Championship, and the Premier League title. In 2016, he won the German Championship and won the World Longtrack Championship for a second time, scoring a 7-ride maximum in the final round in Vechta, and finished in eighth place in the Under-21 World Speedway Championship. While continuing to ride for the Monarchs in the Premier League and then in the newly formed SGB Championship, in 2017 he also signed to ride for Leicester Lions in the SGB Premiership, and was selected to ride for Germany in the 2017 Best Pairs Championship. In 2019, he signed for Redcar Bears.

On 1 September 2019, Riss won his first Riders' Championship at Sheffield after qualifying for the semi-final on 12 points. He won the semi-final and then went on to win the final. He rounded off 2019 by finishing third in the Jason Crump Classic at Kurri Kurri in Australia.

In 2022, Riss was part of the German team, along with Lukas Fienhage and Max Dilger, that won the 2022 Team Long Track World Championship. He signed for the Ipswich Witches in the SGB Premiership 2022 and for the Redcar Bears in the SGB Championship 2022. He helped Ipswich win the Premiership Pairs but broke his leg riding for AC Landshut in the Polish League.

In 2023, Riss re-signed for Ipswich for the SGB Premiership 2023, where he won the Knockout Cup and also re-signed for Redcar for the SGB Championship 2023. Also in 2023, he was part of the German team that competed at the 2023 Speedway World Cup in Poland and was part of the German longtrack team, along with Martin Smolinski, Jörg Tebbe and Stephan Katt, that won the silver medal at the 2023 Team Long Track World Championship.

Riss joined the Oxford Spires in 2024, as a replacement for Nicolai Klindt. Also in 2024, he won a third world team longtrack gold medal at the 2024 FIM Long Track of Nations and became the German champion for the second time.

In 2025, partnering Charles Wright, the pair won the pairs championship for Redcar Bears.

== Major results ==
=== World Longtrack Championship ===
Grand Prix

- 2013 - 1 apps (25th) 4pts
- 2014 - 4 apps (First) 77pts
- 2015 - 4 apps (Second) 68pts
- 2016 - 5 apps (First) 122pts

Best results

- (Netherlands) Eenrum Second 2015, Third 2016
- (Finland) Forssa Second 2016
- (Germany) Herxheim Third 2014
- (France) Marmande 2014
- (Germany) Mühldorf First 2016, Second 2014
- (Germany) Vechta First 2016, Third 2015

=== World Longtrack team championship ===
- 2014 (Finland) Forssa (First) 45pts (Rode with Enrico Janoschka, Jorg Tebbe, Stephan Katt)
- 2015 (Germany) Mühldorf (2nd) 41pts (Rode with Jorg Tebbe, Michael Hartel, Stephan Katt)
- 2022 (Germany) Herxheim (First) 54pts (Rode with Lukas Fienhage, Max Dilger)
- 2023 (Netherlands) Roden (2nd) 57pts (Rode with Martin Smolinski, Jörg Tebbe, Stephan Katt)
- 2024 (France) Morizès (First) 68pts (Rode with Lukas Fienhage, Max Dilger)

=== World individual Championship ===
- 2025 Speedway Grand Prix - 23rd
