= Max Dilger =

German speedway rider

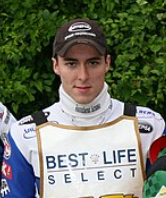
- Dilger in 2009 AC Landshut colours
- Born: 14 July 1989 (age 37); Lahr, Germany
- Nationality: German

Career history

Germany
- 2003–2006: Diedenbergen
- 2007: Wolfslake
- 2007: Pfaffenhofen
- 2008: Neuenknick
- 2009–2011: Landshut
- 2012: Brokstedt
- 2021: Wittstock
- 2022: Berghaupten

Poland
- 2006: Miskolc
- 2007–2008: Łódź
- 2009–2010: Opole
- 2010–2012, 2019, 2022: Piła
- 2013: Krosno
- 2020: Rawicz

Great Britain
- 2009–2010: Edinburgh
- 2012–2013: Redcar
- 2014: Peterborough

Sweden
- 2023: Dackarna

Individual honours
- 2021: German longtrack champion
- 2011: Belgian Champion

Team honours
- 2022, 2024: World Longtrack Team Champion

Max Dilger (born 14 July 1989) is a motorcycle speedway and longtrack speedway rider from Germany. He earned 3 international caps for the German national speedway team.

== Career ==
In 2006, Dilger started racing in Poland and rode for the Hungarian team Speedway Miskolc during the 2006 Polish speedway season. He would then spend two seasons with Łódź. In 2008, Dilger won the German Junior Championship and was nominated as a track reserve at 2008 Speedway Grand Prix of Germany, but was replaced by Kevin Wölbert.

Dilger started racing in the British leagues during the 2009 Premier League speedway season, when riding for the Edinburgh Monarchs. Also in 2009, Dilger rode for Kolejarz Opole in the Polish Speedway Second League. He would stay with both the Scottish club and Opole in 2010.

Dilger then joined Polonia Piła in Poland for 2011 and 2012 and returned to British speedway with the Redcar Bears in 2012.

After the 2014 season with Peterborough Panthers, Dilger left conventional speedway to concentrate on longtrack and was very successful reaching several World Longtrack Series finals.

In 2019, Dilger was part of the German team, along with Lukas Fienhage and Martin Smolinski, that won the silver medal at the 2019 Team Long Track World Championship. He also returned to league speedway in 2019, re-joining Polonia Piła and after two more seasons, once again joined Piła for the 2022 Polish speedway season. In 2022, he was part of the German team, along with Erik Riss and Lukas Fienhage that won the 2022 Team Long Track World Championship.

Dilger was on Dackarna's roster for the 2023 Swedish speedway season and in 2024, riding with Daniel Spiller for the Herxheim Drifters, Dilger took third place in the German pairs championship. In 2024, he won another gold medal at the 2024 FIM Long Track of Nations.

In October 2024, Dilger suffered a serious crash in a French league match, injuring his thoracic vertebrae which caused spinal cord damage and had to undergo a long rehabilitation.

== Results ==
=== Speedway ===
==== World Championships ====
- Individual U-21 World Championship
  - 2007 - 14th placed in the Quarter-Final One
  - 2008 - 15th placed in the Semi-Final One
  - 2009 - 13th placed in the Semi-Final Two
  - 2010 - qualify to the Semi-Final Two
- Team U-21 World Championship
  - 2006 - (Poland) Rybnik - 4th placed (2 pts)
  - 2007 - (Germany) Abensberg - 4th placed (4 pts)
  - 2008 - 3rd place in the Qualifying Round Two
  - 2009 - 2nd place in the Qualifying Round One
  - 2010 - 3rd place in the Qualifying Round Two

==== European Championships ====
- Individual European Championship
  - 2009 - 8th placed in the Semi-Final One
- European Pairs Championship
  - 2006 - (Slovenia) Lendava - 7th placed (0 pts)
  - 2007 - 6th placed in the Semi-Final One
  - 2009 - (Slovenia) Miskolc - 5th placed (did not started)
- Individual U-19 European Championship
  - 2008 - 13th placed in the Semi-Final Three
- Team U-19 European Championship
  - 2008 - (Poland) Rawicz - Runner-up (2 pts)
- European Club Champions' Cup
  - 2007 - 4th placed in the Semi-Final One for MC Pfaffenhofen

=== Longtrack ===
==== World Longtrack Championship ====
Year	GP	Points	Pos	GP Wins	GP Podiums
2017	1	6	19	0	0
2018	3	31	10	0	0
2019	5	44	9	0	0
2020	2	19	8	0	0

=== Grasstrack ===
==== European Championship ====
Year	Venue	Points	Pos
2017	(Germany) Hertigan	NRS	0
2018	(France) Tayac	9	8
2019	(Germany) Bad Hersfeld	1	19
2020	(France) Tayac	12	5

== See also ==
- Germany national speedway team (U21, U19)
