= Bertil Stridh =

Swedish speedway rider

Bertil Strid
- Born: 23 January 1931; Sweden
- Died: 12 March 2013 (aged 82)
- Nationality: Swedish

Career history
- 1954–1963: Getingarna

Individual honours
- 1962, 1963: European Longtrack Champion

Team honours
- 1963: Allsvenskan Champion

Bertil Stridh (1931-2013) was an international speedway rider from Sweden.

== Speedway career ==
Stridh won the gold medal at the European Longtrack Championship in the 1962 Individual Long Track European Championship and 1963 Individual Long Track European Championship.

Shortly before his death, Stridh was a trustee for Lejonen and completed a report on the club's bankruptcy.
