= Hans Siegl =

German speedway rider

- Born: 8 September 1944; Gröbenzell, Germany
- Died: 25 June 1978 (aged 33)
- Nationality: German

Career history

West Germany
- 1978: Olching

Individual honours
- 1972: West German Longtrack champion

Hans Siegl (8 September 1944 – 25 June 1978) was an international speedway rider. He participated principally in Ice speedway and Long Track events.

== Speedway career ==
Siegel, son of Albin Siegl (who was a famous speedway rider in Germany), started his career in 1966 and was West German longtrack champion in 1972.

Siegl was a notable grasstrack and longtrack rider and represented West Germany in the sport.

Siegl died on 25 June 1978, in hospital 30 days after a serious crash in Linz.

== World finals ==
=== World Longtrack Championship ===
- 1971 - (Norway) Oslo (8th)
- 1972 - (West Germany) Mühldorf (4th)
- 1973 - (Norway) Oslo (2nd)
- 1977 - (Denmark) Aalborg (2nd)

=== World Ice Championship ===
- 1970 - (Sweden) Nässjö (11th)
- 1971 - (West Germany) Inzell (13th)
- 1973 - (West Germany) Inzell (9th)
- 1977 - (West Germany) Inzell (9th)
- 1978 - (Netherlands) Assen (6th)

== See also ==
- Rider deaths in motorcycle speedway
