= Lukas Fienhage =

German speedway rider

- Born: 12 September 1999 (age 27); Lohne, Germany
- Nationality: German

Career history

Germany
- 2022–2024: Cloppenburg
- 2022: Brokstedt

Poland
- 2022: Piła

Individual honours
- 2020: World Longtrack Champion
- 2024: World longrack silver
- 2025: World longrack bronze

Team honours
- 2022, 2024: World Longtrack Team Champion

Lukas Fienhage (born 12 September 1999) is an international speedway rider from Germany.

== Speedway career ==
Fienhage was part of the German team, along with Martin Smolinski and Max Dilger, that won the silver medal at the 2019 Team Long Track World Championship.

The following season, Fienhage won the gold medal at the World Longtrack Championship in the 2020 Individual Long Track World Championship.

In 2022, Fienhage was part of the German team, along with Erik Riss and Max Dilger, that won the 2022 Team Long Track World Championship and two years later in 2024, won another gold medal at the 2024 FIM Long Track of Nations.

At the 2024 FIM Long Track World Championship, Fienhage secured the silver medal, in addition to winning two of the five rounds and in 2025 won the bronze.
