= Don Godden =

British motorcycle rider

- Born: 13 November 1936; Blackburn, England
- Died: 28 May 2011 (aged 74); Dartford, England
- Nationality: England

Individual honours
- 1969: Long Track World Champion
- 1965, 1967, 1972: British Grasstrack Championship
- 1959, 1962, 1965, 1974: South-Eastern Centre Championship
- 1968: Lydden International
- 1970, 1973, 1974, 1975: Wimborne Whoppa
- 1971, 1973: German Longtrack Silver Helmet
- 1962, 1964.: Teterow Bergring Cup Winner

Don Vincent Godden (born 13 November 1936 – 28 May 2011) was a British motorcycle rider. He competed in longtrack and grasstrack racing. He competed in twelve World Longtrack Championship Finals and won the title in 1969. Don's son Mitchel is also a successful longtrack and grasstrack racer, as is his grandson Cameron.

Don was very much a Motorcycle racing pioneer, not only was he the first to compete regularly on the continent but was also a successful Motorcycle Racing engineer. He designed many engines for successful longtrack, grasstrack and speedway riders.

== Godden engineering ==
Don started his engineering company in the early 1970s designing frames and then engines. His GR 500 engine was used by many top riders and it soon became a championship winning engine.

United States rider Shawn Moran won the Longtrack World Championship with the Godden engine in 1983 and twelve months later at least half of the finalist's all used this same engine. The last of the Longtrack Championships came with Marcel Gerhard in 1992. In Speedway Hans Nielsen won three world titles using the Godden engine in 1986, 1987 and 1989.

== Racing career ==
=== World Longtrack Championship ===
- 1966 (Germany) Mühldorf (5th) 7pts
- 1967 (Germany) Scheeßel (Second) 13pts
- 1968 (Germany) Mühldorf (Second) 16pts
- 1969 (Norway) Oslo (Champion) 14pts
- 1970 (Germany) Scheeßel (Second) 26pts
- 1971 (Norway) Oslo (7th) 10pts
- 1972 (Germany) Mühldorf (10th) 9pts
- 1973 (Norway) Oslo (4th) 19pts
- 1974 (Germany) Scheeßel (6th) 13pts
- 1975 (Socialist Federal Republic of Yugoslavia) Gornja Radgona (8th) 11pts
- 1976 (Czech Republic) Mariánské Lázně (12th) 5pts
- 1977 Did not compete
- 1978 (Germany) Mühldorf (14th) 8pts

=== European Grasstrack Championship ===
- 1978 (United Kingdom) Hereford (Third) 23pts

=== British Grasstrack Championship Podiums ===
- 1962 (England) Evesham (Second)
- 1964 (England) Sleaford (Third)
- 1965 (England) Braintree (Champion)
- 1967 (England) Folkestone (Champion)
- 1972 (England) Burton Constable Hall (Champion)
