= Roden, Netherlands =

Dutch municipality

Roden
- Town
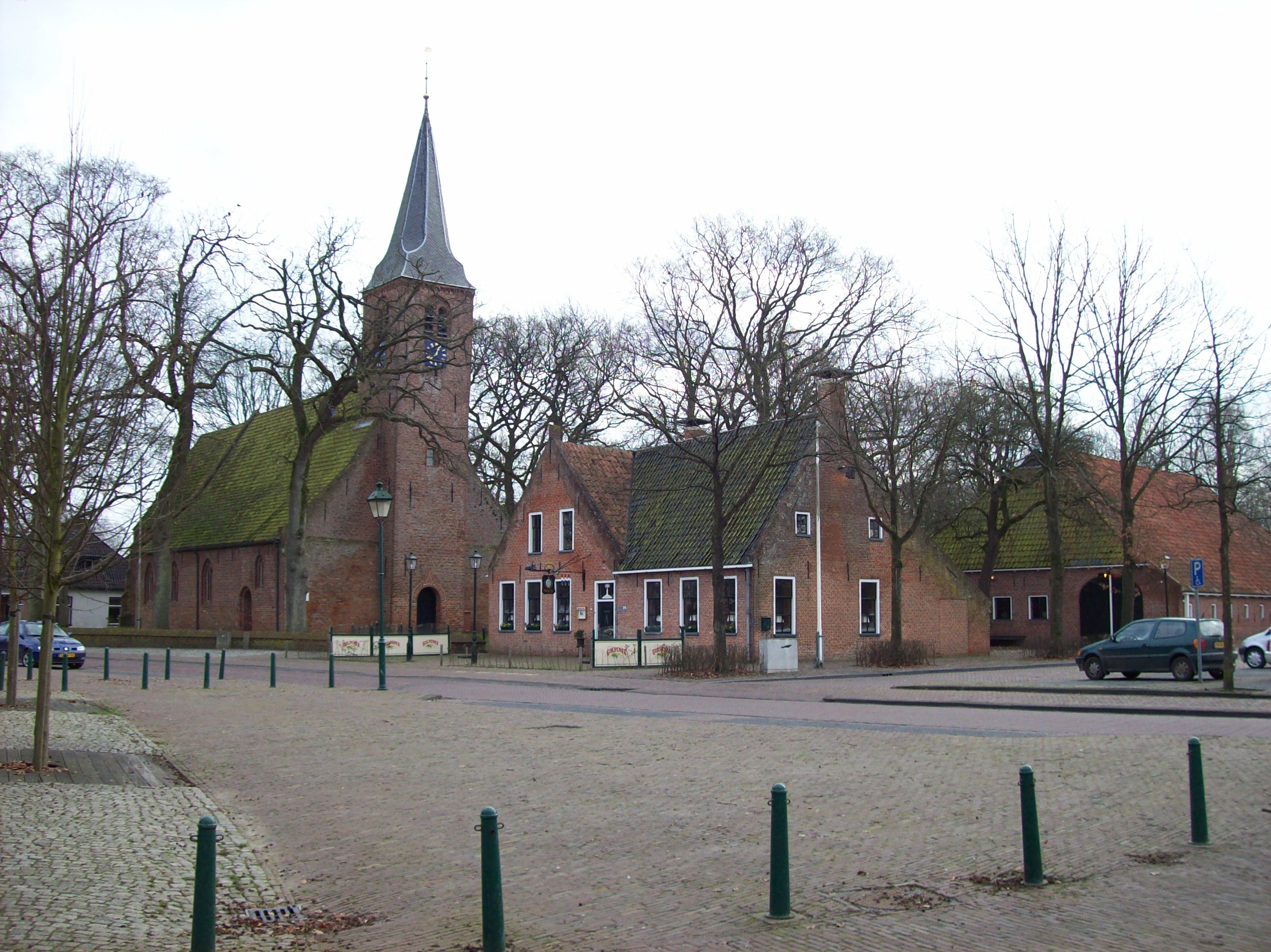
- Roden in 2007

- Location in the province of Drenthe in the Netherlands Roden (Netherlands)
- Coordinates: 53°8′18″N 6°25′57″E
- Country: Netherlands
- Province: Drenthe
- Municipality: Noordenveld

Area
  - Total: 64.32 km^{2} (24.83 sq mi)
- Elevation: 3.1 m (10 ft)

Population (2021)
  - Total: 18,810
  - Density: 292.4/km^{2} (757.4/sq mi)
- Time zone: UTC+1 (CET)
  - Summer (DST): UTC+2 (CEST)
- Postal code: 9301, 9304, 9305, 9311-9315
- Dialing code: 0591

Roden (Dutch pronunciation: [ˈroːdə(n)]) is a town in the Dutch province of Drenthe. It is located in the municipality of Noordenveld, about 16 km (10 miles) southwest of Groningen.

== History ==
The village was first mentioned in 1139 as Rothen, and means "settlement near a clearing in the forest". Roden is an esdorp which developed in the Early Middle Ages. It has a large brink (village square) near the church and a double triangular brink around what is nowadays called Julianaplein.

The Dutch Reformed church has three aisles and dates from the 13th century. The tower has a constricted needle spire which dates from the 15th or 16th century. The church was extended in the 15th century. The church was restored several times during the Dutch Revolt due to war damage.

Huis Mensinge or Huis te Roden is a havezate (manor house) which was built in the 15th century as a replacement of an estate from 1381. It was plundered by Groningen in 1498. The building received its current shape in 1728. In 1985, it was sold to the municipality and now contains a museum.

Roden was home to 1,889 people in 1840. In the 1950s, it started to develop as an industrial centre. The Kapteyn Astronomical Institute was established in the town as the astronomy department of the University of Groningen, and it started to develop as a commuter town for Groningen. Many of the nearby hamlets have been annexed.

An Ot en Sien statue, the main characters from a famous Dutch children's book, has been placed on the village square.

Roden was a separate municipality until 1998, when it merged into the municipality of Noordenveld as a part of municipal reorganisations, however it is still the capital of the municipality.

== Sport ==
The Speed Centre Roden is located approximately 8 km to the south-west on Veldweg. The venue hosts Long track speedway and has held multiple rounds of the FIM Long Track World Championship since 2018 and is currently one of the leading long track facilities in the world.

== Notable people ==
- Peter Dijkstra (born 1978), conductor
- Lammert Huitema (born 1961), speed skater

== Gallery ==
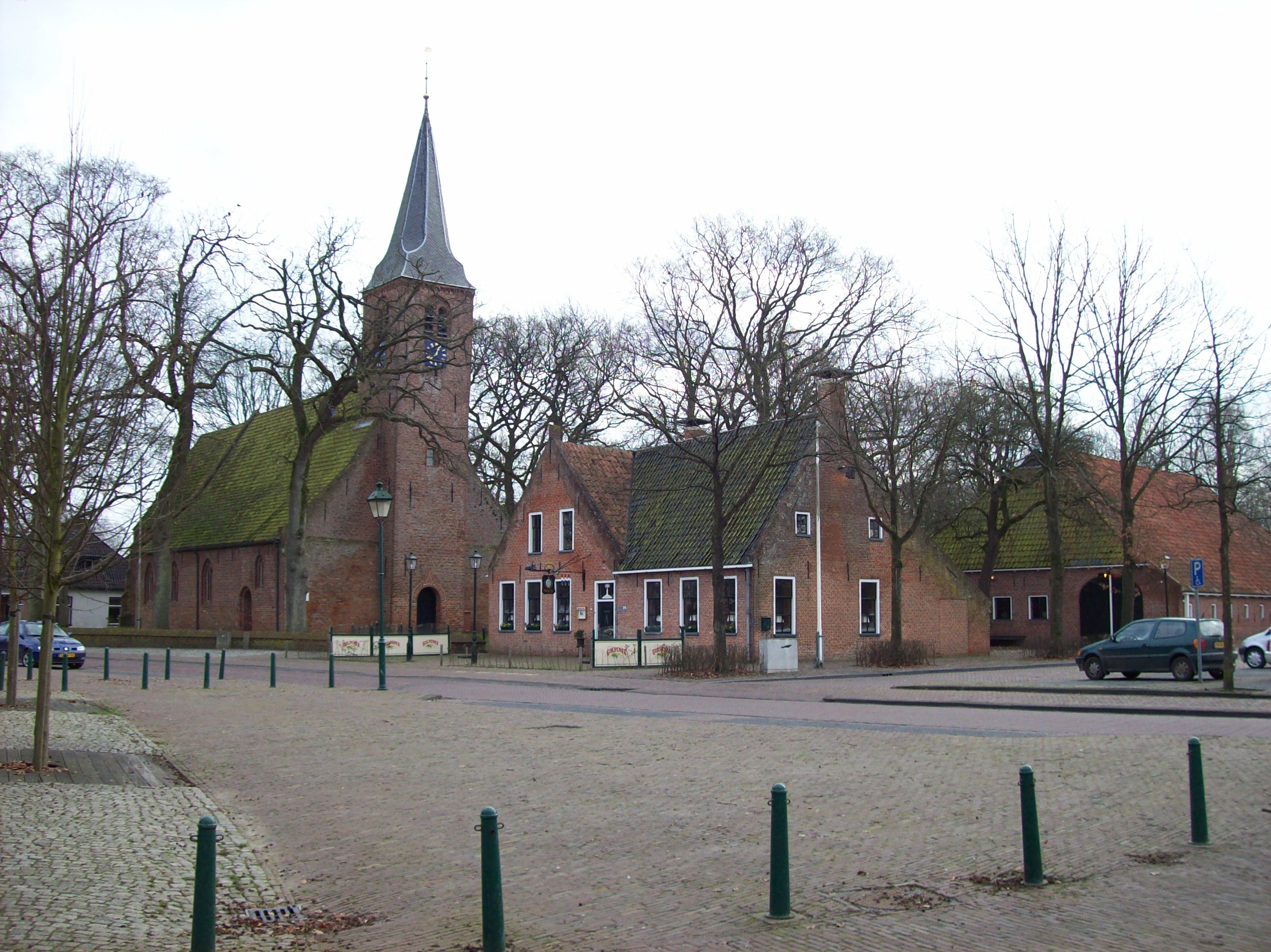
Church of Roden

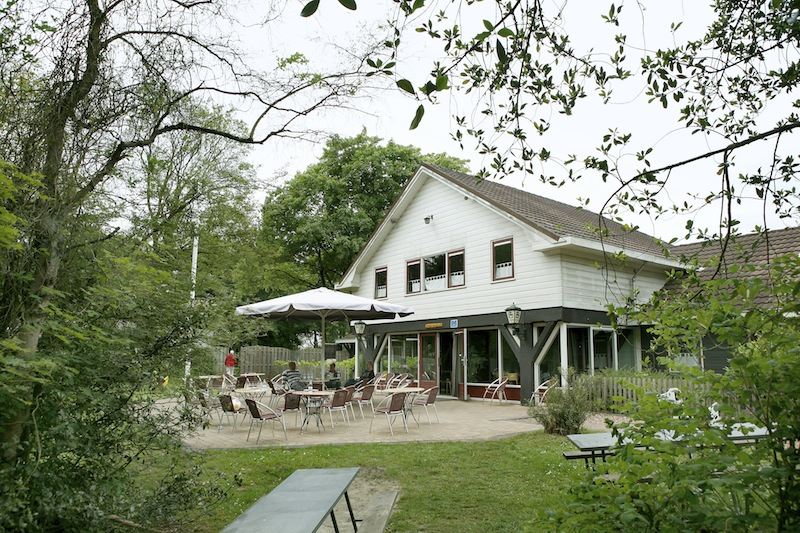
Holiday home

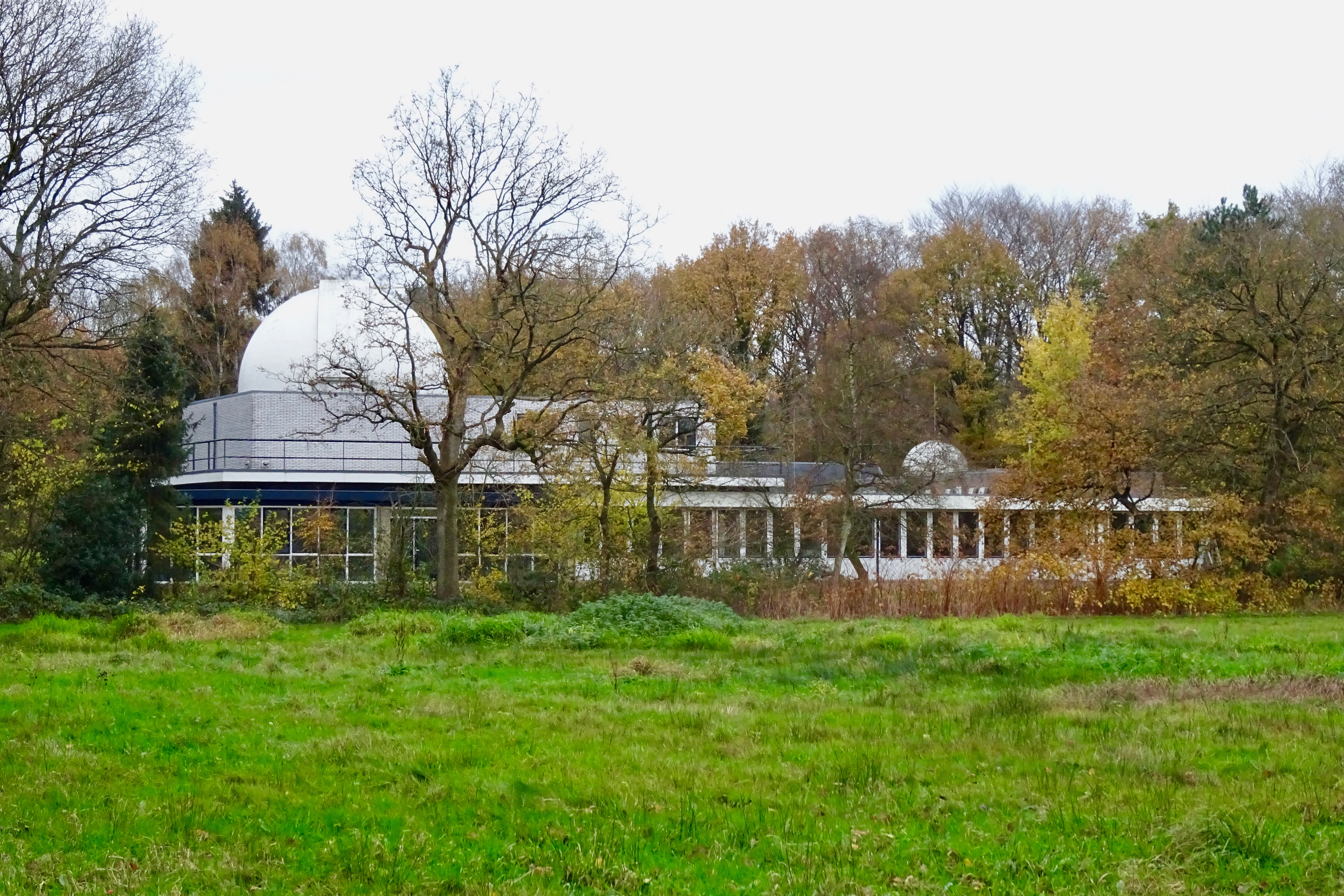
Kapteyn Astronomical Institute

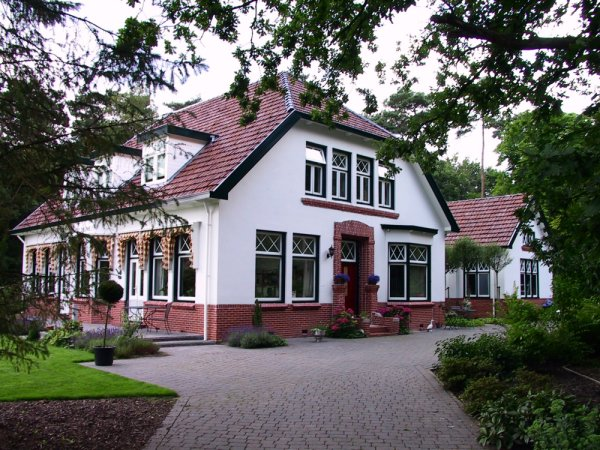
Villa Dezulthe
