= Svend Nissen =

Danish speedway rider (1918–2009)

- Born: 31 May 1918; Tommerup, Denmark
- Died: 24 November 2009 (aged 91)
- Nationality: Danish

Individual honours
- 1950, 1957: Danish Champion

Svend Nissen (31 May 1918 – 24 November 2009) was an international speedway rider from Denmark.

== Life and career ==
Nissen was a champion of Denmark, winning the Danish Championship in 1950 and 1957.

Nissen retired from riding aged 50, but remained active repairing engines with the Fynborne speedway team. He died on 24 November 2009, at the age of 91.
