= Josef Hofmeister =

German speedway rider

- Born: 17 June 1934 (age 92); Abensberg, West Germany
- Nickname: Wack Hofmeister
- Nationality: German

Career history

Germany
- 1950s: MSC Abensberg

Great Britain
- 1957: Southampton Saints

Individual honours
- 1958, 1959, 1960: Long Track World Champion
- 1957, 1959, 1960: Continental Final Champion
- 1956, 1959, 1961: German Longtrack Golden Helmet
- 1957, 1958, 1959, 1960, 1961: German Longtrack Silver Helmet

Josef Hofmeister nicknamed Wack Hofmeister (born 17 June 1934) is a German former motorcycle rider, who competed in Grasstrack, Longtrack and motorcycle speedway. He competed in six World Longtrack Championship Finals and won a three consecutive titles between 1958 and 1960. Hofmeister was also a World Speedway finalist on four occasions.

== Career ==
Hofmeister started his career in 1949 in the youth class and retired in 1963 at the age of 29. In the 1950s and early 1960s, he was the first German star of international motorcycle racing.

Hofmeister was a three time winner of the Individual Speedway Long Track World Championship or European Championship as it was called, when he won it in 1958, 1959 and 1960.

In 1957, Hofmeister reached his first world final, making his way through the rounds to compete in the 1957 Individual Speedway World Championship. He only ever had one match in British speedway for the Southampton Saints, during the 1957 Speedway National League season.

In 1958, Hofmeister reached his second world final, competing in the final of the 1958 Individual Speedway World Championship.

In 2022, Hofmeister received the honour of having the Altes Stadion Abensberg renamed after him. It would be known as the Wack Hofmeister Stadium.

== Retirement ==
After retiring, Hofmeister ran a sports shop in Kempten, Allgäu.

== Individual World Championship ==
- 1957 - (England) London, Wembley Stadium - 16th - 0pts
- 1958 - (England) London, Wembley Stadium - 15th - 2pts
- 1959 - (England) London, Wembley Stadium - 13th - 4pts
- 1960 - (England) London, Wembley Stadium - 8th - 6pts

== World Longtrack Championship ==
=== European Championship ===
- 1957 (Sweden) Stockholm (Second) 14pts
- 1958 (West Germany) Mühldorf (Champion) 21pts
- 1959 (Finland) Helsinki (Champion) 19pts
- 1960 (West Germany) Plattling (Champion) 24pts
- 1961 Semi-final
- 1962 (West Germany) Mühldorf (13th) 8pts
- 1963 (Sweden) Malmö (12th) 7pts
