= Stephan Katt =

German speedway rider

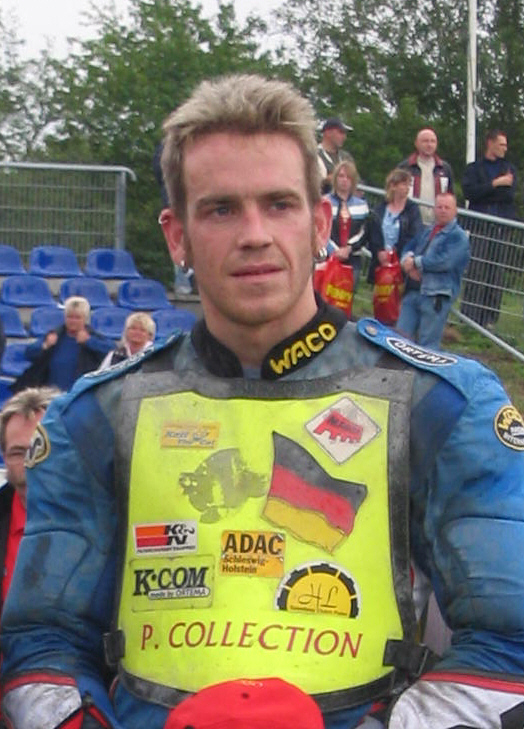
- Born: 15 September 1979 (age 47); Kiel, Germany
- Nationality: German

Career history

Germany
- 1998–2012: Brokstedt

Great Britain
- 2003, 2006–2008: Somerset
- 2006: Swindon
- 2006: Oxford

Denmark
- 2004–2005: Outrup
- 2006–2007: Brovst
- 2008: Holsted

Poland
- 2006–2008: Łódź
- 2009: Opole

Individual honours
- 2006, 2009, 2012: European Grasstrack Champion
- 2010, 2011: German Longtrack champion

Team honours
- 2007, 2008, 2010, 2011, 2012, 2014: World Long Track Team Champion

Stephan Katt (born 15 September 1979) is a German former speedway rider. He competed in grasstrack, longtrack and motorcycle speedway. He earned one international cap for the German national speedway team.

== Career ==
Katt was a member of Germany national long track team and is a six-time World Team Champion. In addition, he also won the German national longtrack championship three times.

Katt rode in Britain for Somerset Rebels in 2003 and from 2006 to 2008.

In 2023, Katt was part of the German team, along with Erik Riss, Martin Smolinski and Jörg Tebbe, that won the silver medal at the 2023 Team Long Track World Championship.

== Results ==
=== World Longtrack Championship ===
Grand-Prix

- 2000 - 1 apps (24th) 3pts
- 2001 - 4 apps (16th) 21pts
- 2002 - 5 apps (10th) 39pts
- 2003 - 4 apps (15th) 24pts
- 2004 - 4 apps (9th) 43pts
- 2005 - 3 apps (9th) 34pts
- 2006 - 1 app (22nd) 0pts
- 2007 - 3 apps (4th) 42pts
- 2008 - 4 apps (7th) 38pts
- 2009 - 3 apps (15th) 30pts
- 2010 - 6 apps (5th) 99pts
- 2011 - 6 apps (3rd) 101pts
- 2012 - 6 apps (8th) 77pts
- 2013 - 6 apps (13th) 56pts
- 2014 - 4 apps (6th) 52pts
- 2015 - 4 apps (13th) 27pts
- 2016 - 3 apps (15th) 16pts

Best Grand-Prix Results

- (France) Saint-Macaire First 2007
- (Czech Republic) Mariánské Lázně First 2010, Third 2011
- (France) Marmande Second 2014
- (France) Morizès Third 2011, 2012
- (Germany) Pfarrkirchen First 2010
- (Germany) Vechta First 2011

=== Team Championship ===
- 2007 (France) Morizès (First) 21/51pts (Rode with Gerd Riss, Enrico Janoschka, Matthias Kröger)
- 2008 (Germany) Werlte (First) 7/45pts (Rode with Gerd Riss, Bernd Diener, Matthias Kröger)
- 2009 (Netherlands) Eenrum Did not compete
- 2010 (Germany) Morizès (First) 14/49pts (Rode with Matthias Kröger, Richard Speiser, Martin Smolinski)
- 2011 (Germany) Scheeßel (First) 19/56pts (Rode with Richard Speiser, Jorg Tebbe, Martin Smolinski)
- 2012 (France) Saint-Macaire (First) 22/48 (Rode with Matthias Kröger, Jorg Tebbe, Bernd Diener)
- 2013 (England) Folkestone (4th) 16/44pts (Rode with Richard Speiser, Jorg Tebbe, Enrico Janoschka)
- 2014 (Finland) Forssa (First) 6/45pts (Rode with Enrico Janoschka, Jorg Tebbe, Erik Riss)
- 2015 (Germany) Mühldorf (Second) 0/41pts (Rode with Jorg Tebbe, Michael Hartel, Erik Riss)
- 2016 (Czech Republic) Mariánské Lázně (Second) 2/44pts (Rode with Martin Smolinski, Jorg Tebbe, Michael Hartel)

== European Grasstrack Championship ==
- 1999 Semi-finalist
- 2000 Did not compete
- 2001 Did not compete
- 2002 (Germany) Berghaupten (10th) 10pts
- 2003 Semi-finalist
- 2004 (Netherlands) Eenrum (5th) 18pts
- 2005 (Germany) Schwarme (6th) 11pts
- 2006 (France) La Réole (champion) 18pts
- 2007 (England) Folkestone (second) 13pts
- 2008 (Netherlands) Siddeburen (14th) 6pts
- 2009 (Germany) Berghaupten (champion) 17pts
- 2010 (France) La Réole (18th) 1pt
- 2011 (England) Skegness (11th) 8pts
- 2012 (Netherlands) Eenrum (champion) 16pts
- 2013 (Germany) Bielefeld (6th) 17pts
- 2014 (France) Saint-Macaire (10th) 11pts
- 2015 (Netherlands) Staphorst (third) 16pts
- 2016 Semi-finalist
