= Timo Laine =

Finnish speedway rider

- Born: 5 July 1934 (age 92); Turku, Finland
- Nationality: Finnish

Individual honours
- 1961: European Longtrack Champion
- 1961, 1962, 1963: Finland National Champion

Timo Aleksander Laine (born 5 July 1934) is a former international Speedway longtrack and motorcycle speedway rider from Finland. He was a three-time champion of Finland.

== Speedway career ==
Laine won the gold medal at the European Longtrack Championship in the 1961 Individual Long Track European Championship. In addition, he won the Nordic Longtrack Championship three times (1964, 1965, 1966) and the Finish Longtrack Championship seven times (1962, 1963, 1964, 1965, 1967, 1968, 1972).

Laine was also a prominent rider in conventional speedway and won the Finnish Individual Speedway Championship on three occasions in 1961, 1962 and 1963.

Laine did not ride in the British leagues for a team, which was rare for the leading riders of the time but did visit the United Kingdom to take part in several meetings.
