= Jon Ødegaard =

Norwegian speedway rider

- Born: 25 May 1937; Revagen, Norway
- Died: February 2002 (aged 64)
- Nationality: Norwegian

Career history
- 1969: Swindon Robins

Individual honours
- 1970: European Longtrack Champion

Jon Ødegaard (1937–2002) was an international speedway rider from Norway. He earned three caps for the Norway national speedway team.

== Speedway career ==
Ødegaard won the gold medal at the European Longtrack Championship in the 1970 Individual Long Track European Championship. In addition, he won the Nordic Longtrack Championship four times (1969, 1970, 1974, 1975) and the Norwegian Longtrack Championship seven times (1964, 1965, 1970, 1971, 1973, 1974, 1976).

Ødegaard rode in the top tier of British Speedway in 1969, riding for Swindon Robins as a replacement for the injured Mike Broadbank.
