= Manfred Poschenreider =

German speedway rider (1938–2023)

- Born: 31 March 1938; Kempten, Germany
- Died: 11 September 2023 (aged 85)
- Nationality: German

Career history

West Germany
- 1975–1976: Krumbach

Individual honours
- 1966, 1967, 1968: Long Track World Champion
- 1966: German Silver Helmet
- 1965, 1966, 1969, 1971, 1972: West German Longtrack Golden Helmet
- 1968, 1969, 1970: West German Longtrack Champion
- 1966, 1967, 1968, 1969, 1972: West German Longtrack Silver Helmet
- 1969, 1971: German Speedway Champion

Team honours
- 1975, 1976: West German League Championship

Manfred Poschenreider (31 March 1938 – 11 September 2023) was a German motorcycle racer and competed in Grasstrack, Longtrack and Speedway. He was also known as Manni Poschenreider during his speedway career.

== Career ==
Poschenreider started his career riding in junior classes in 1953 before racing internationally from 1959. From 1966 to 1968, he won three European Championship sand championships. He rode for MC Krumbach, where he won the West German League Championship in 1975 and 1976.

Long Eaton Archers made an unsuccessful attempt to sign Poschenreider in 1966.

Poschenreider died on 11 September 2023, at the age of 85.

== World Longtrack Championship ==
=== European Finals ===
- 1959 Helsinki (16th) 3pts
- 1960 Did not compete
- 1961 Oslo (4th) 3pts
- 1962 Mühldorf (5th) 12pts
- 1963 Malmö (Third) 10pts
- 1964 Scheeßel (Third) 10pts
- 1965 Qualifying Round
- 1966 Mühldorf (Champion) 15pts
- 1967 Scheeßel (Champion) 13pts
- 1968 Mühldorf (Champion) 10pts
- 1969 Oslo (8th) 15pts
- 1970 Did not compete

=== World Finals ===
- 1971 Oslo (Second) 26pts
- 1972 Mühldorf (Second) 23pts
- 1973 Oslo (Third) 20pts
- 1974 Scheeßel (9th) 10pts
- 1975 Gornja Radgona (10th) 9pts

== West Germany Longtrack Championship ==
- 1967 Munich (Second)
- 1968 Jubek (Champion)
- 1969 Vilshofen (Champion)
- 1971 Jubek (First)
- 1972 Pfarrkirchen (Third)
- 1973 Ludinghausen (Second)

== Speedway World Final appearances ==
=== World Pairs Championship ===
- 1968 - Kempten (with Fred Eberl) - 5th - 10pts (8)

* Unofficial World Championships.
