= Scheeßel =

German municipality

- Municipality
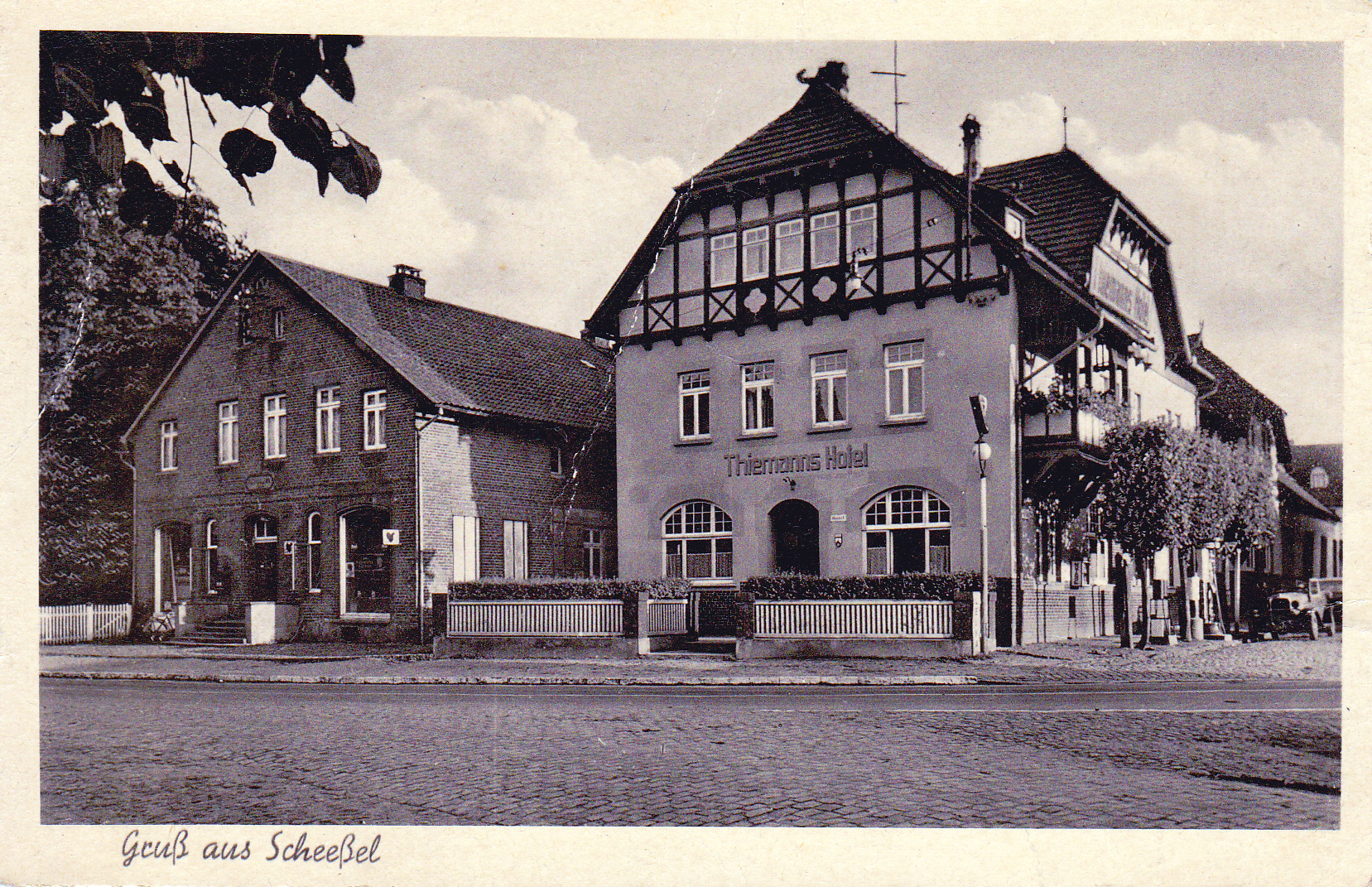
- Postcard "Greetings from Schleeßel", circa 1920–1930

- Coat of arms

- Location of Scheeßel within Rotenburg (Wümme) district
- Interactive map of Scheeßel
- Location within Germany Location within Lower Saxony
- Coordinates: 53°10′14″N 9°28′59″E
- Country: Germany
- State: Lower Saxony
- District: Rotenburg (Wümme)

Government
  - Mayor (2021–26): Ulrike Jungemann (CDU)

Area
  - Total: 149.70 km^{2} (57.80 sq mi)
- Elevation: 30 m (98 ft)

Population (2025-12-31)
  - Total: 12,709
  - Density: 84.896/km^{2} (219.88/sq mi)
- Time zone: UTC+01:00 (CET)
  - Summer (DST): UTC+02:00 (CEST)
- Postal codes: 27383
- Dialling codes: 04263
- Vehicle registration: ROW
- Website: www.scheessel.de

Scheeßel (German pronunciation: [ˈʃeːsl̩]; Northern Low Saxon: Scheeßl) is a municipality in the district of Rotenburg, in Lower Saxony, Germany. It is situated on the river Wümme, approx. 10 km northeast of Rotenburg, 45 km east of Bremen, and 70 km southwest of Hamburg.

== History ==
Scheeßel belonged to the Prince-Bishopric of Verden, established in 1180. In 1648 the Prince-Bishopric was transformed into the Principality of Verden, which was first ruled in personal union by the Swedish Crown – interrupted by a Danish occupation (1712 to 1715) – and from 1715 on by the Hanoverian Crown. The Kingdom of Hanover incorporated the Principality in a real union and the Princely territory, including Scheeßel, became part of the new Stade Region, established in 1823.

The village celebrated its 1,200th anniversary in 2005. However, this was based on the mention of Skaesla in the Diedenhofener Kapitular, issued by Charlemagne on 24 December 805 in Diedenhofen (now Thionville), and there are rival theories as to where Skaesla might be.

The village is host to the annual Hurricane Festival close to the Eichenring motorcycle speedway.

== Twin towns ==
Scheeßel is twinned with:

- Tukums, Latvia
- Teterow, Germany

== Sport ==
The Eichenring is located to the south-east of the municipality on Westerveseder Landstraße. The venue hosts Long track speedway and has held multiple rounds of the FIM Long Track World Championship since 1958 and remains one of the leading long track facilities in the world.

== Notable people ==
- Paul Carell (1911–1997), Nazi propagandist, lived in Scheeßel after World War II
- Matthias Scherz (born 1971), footballer
- Elke Twesten (born 1963), politician
