= Mühldorf =

German town

Mühldorf am Inn
- Town
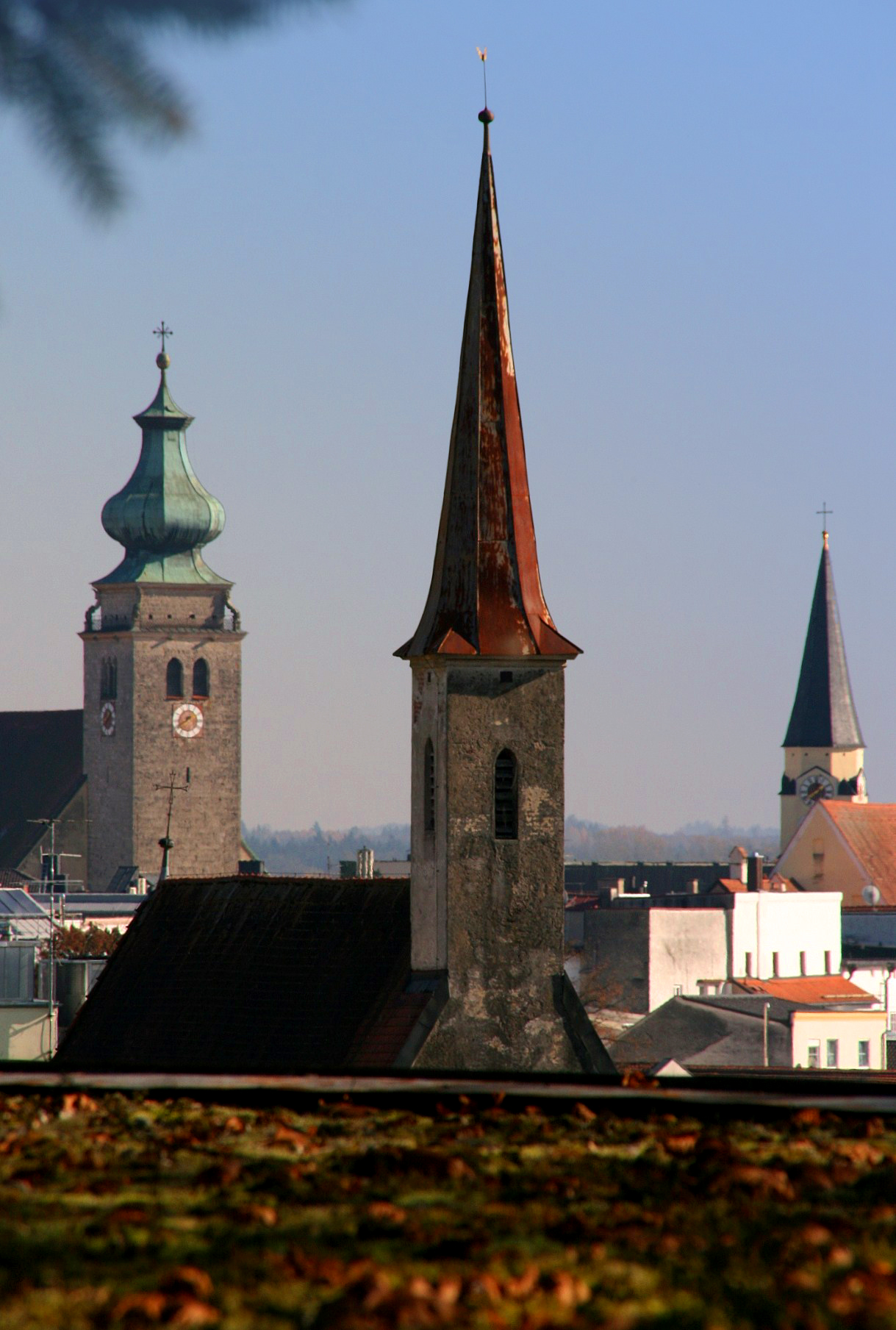
- The three churches of Mühldorf

- Coat of arms

- Location of Mühldorf am Inn within Mühldorf am Inn district
- Interactive map of Mühldorf am Inn
- Location within Germany Location within Bavaria
- Coordinates: 48°14′44″N 12°31′22″E
- Country: Germany
- State: Bavaria
- Admin. region: Oberbayern
- District: Mühldorf am Inn
- Subdivisions: 4 Stadtteile

Government
  - Mayor (2020–26): Michael Hetzl

Area
  - Total: 29.42 km^{2} (11.36 sq mi)
- Elevation: 384 m (1,260 ft)

Population (2025-12-31)
  - Total: 22,624
  - Density: 769.0/km^{2} (1,992/sq mi)
- Time zone: UTC+01:00 (CET)
  - Summer (DST): UTC+02:00 (CEST)
- Postal codes: 84453
- Dialling codes: 08631
- Vehicle registration: MÜ
- Website: www.muehldorf.de

Mühldorf am Inn (German pronunciation: [ˈmyːldɔʁf ʔam ʔˈɪn], lit. 'Mühldorf on the Inn'; Central Bavarian: Muihdorf am Inn) is a town in Bavaria, Germany, and the capital of the district Mühldorf on the river Inn. It is located at 48°14′30″N 12°31′30″E, and had a population of about 17,808 in 2005. The 2022 census counted 21,917 residents.

== History ==
During the Middle Ages, the town and castle were an alod of the Luchen family. On 28 October 1287, Rapoto Luchen announced that he had entered an agreement with Archbishop Rudolph of Salzburg to hand over the alod, become the archbishop's ministerialis, and thereafter run the lands as a fief of the Prince-Archbishops of Salzburg.

On 28 September 1322, the decisive Battle of Mühldorf was fought here between Bavaria and Salzburg. Before the battle, the Prince-Archbishop of Salzburg knighted several of the burghers of the town.

In 1802, Mühldorf became part of Bavaria.

During World War II, it was the site of the Mühldorf concentration camp complex. Several Allied air raids directed at the area were designed to target the rail links into Munich and disrupt the transportation of materiel from the "Innwerk" industrial park in Töging am Inn. Around 44 U.S. Air personnel are thought to have perished during the return flight following one of these raids. Civilian casualties are believed to be much higher due to many aircraft crews being unable to identify their primary objectives.

== Climate ==
Climate data for Mühldorf (1991–2020 normals)
| Month | Jan | Feb | Mar | Apr | May | Jun | Jul | Aug | Sep | Oct | Nov | Dec | Year |
|---|---|---|---|---|---|---|---|---|---|---|---|---|---|
| Mean daily maximum °C (°F) | 2.5 (36.5) | 4.7 (40.5) | 9.8 (49.6) | 15.3 (59.5) | 19.6 (67.3) | 23.0 (73.4) | 25.0 (77.0) | 24.7 (76.5) | 19.6 (67.3) | 14.0 (57.2) | 7.2 (45.0) | 3.2 (37.8) | 14.1 (57.4) |
| Daily mean °C (°F) | −0.9 (30.4) | 0.2 (32.4) | 4.4 (39.9) | 9.0 (48.2) | 13.7 (56.7) | 17.1 (62.8) | 18.5 (65.3) | 18.1 (64.6) | 13.4 (56.1) | 8.8 (47.8) | 3.7 (38.7) | 0.2 (32.4) | 8.9 (48.0) |
| Mean daily minimum °C (°F) | −4.2 (24.4) | −4.1 (24.6) | −0.7 (30.7) | 2.5 (36.5) | 7.4 (45.3) | 11.0 (51.8) | 12.3 (54.1) | 12.0 (53.6) | 8.0 (46.4) | 4.3 (39.7) | 0.3 (32.5) | −2.8 (27.0) | 3.8 (38.8) |
| Average precipitation mm (inches) | 49.7 (1.96) | 42.0 (1.65) | 57.6 (2.27) | 46.4 (1.83) | 89.2 (3.51) | 96.9 (3.81) | 101.4 (3.99) | 93.3 (3.67) | 68.1 (2.68) | 58.0 (2.28) | 51.8 (2.04) | 54.5 (2.15) | 809.0 (31.85) |
| Average precipitation days (≥ 1.0 mm) | 15.3 | 13.9 | 15.0 | 11.9 | 15.2 | 15.7 | 15.4 | 14.5 | 14.4 | 14.8 | 14.6 | 16.3 | 176.9 |
| Average snowy days (≥ 1.0 cm) | 14.4 | 11.5 | 4.5 | 0.5 | 0 | 0 | 0 | 0 | 0 | 0.1 | 3.0 | 10.1 | 44.1 |
| Average relative humidity (%) | 88.1 | 84.4 | 78.6 | 72.5 | 73.0 | 74.8 | 75.0 | 77.1 | 83.0 | 87.1 | 91.1 | 90.1 | 81.2 |
| Mean monthly sunshine hours | 61.0 | 89.4 | 139.6 | 189.1 | 217.1 | 228.6 | 244.1 | 231.8 | 159.5 | 109.9 | 57.6 | 51.3 | 1,779 |
Source: World Meteorological Organization

== Sport ==
The Rennbahnstadion Mühldorf is located to the south-east of the river on Altöttinger Str. 27. The venue hosts Long track speedway and has held multiple rounds of the FIM Long Track World Championship since 1958 and remains one of the leading long track facilities in the world.
