= 2010 Speedway World Cup Qualification =

2010 Speedway World Cup

Seasons
- ← 2009 2011 →

The 2010 Speedway World Cup Qualification (SWC) was a two events of motorcycle speedway meetings used to determine the two national teams who qualify for the 2010 Speedway World Cup. According to the FIM rules the top six nations (Poland, Australia, Sweden, Russia, Great Britain and Denmark) from the 2009 Speedway World Cup were automatically qualified.

== Results ==
- Qualifying Round One
- (Italy) Lonigo
- 1 May 2010

Pos.	National team	Pts.
1	Finland	48
2	Slovenia	47
3	United States	30
4	Italy	24

- Qualifying Round Two
- (Germany) Abensberg
- 24 May 2010

Pos.	National team	Pts.
1	Czech Republic	53
2	Germany	50
3	Latvia	43
4	Norway	4

== Heat details ==
=== Qualifying Round One ===
- 1 May 2010
- ITA Lonigo, Veneto
- Pista Santa Marina (Length: 334 m)
- Referee: (Germany) Christian Froschauer
- Jury President: (Sweden) Christer Bergstrom
- References

Placing	Team / Rider name	Total	1	2	3	4	5	6	7	8	9	10	11	12	13	14	15	16	17	18	19	20	21	22	23	24	25
1	Finland	48	3	5	8	10	12	13	15	17	18	21	24	24	26	29	32	34	37	40	41	41	43	43	44	47	48
1	(1) Joonas Kylmäkorpi	12	3							2						3			3								1
1	(2) Juha Hautamäki	11		2							1						3			3			2
1	(3) Timo Lahti	10			3							3	3								1			0
1	(4) Kalle Katajisto	4				2		1						0								0			1
1	(5) Kauko Nieminen (c)	11					2		2						2			2								3
2	Slovenia	47	2	3	3	6	9	9	12	13	16	18	19	21	24	24	25	28	30	32	34	36	39	42	42	44	47
2	(1) Matej Žagar (c)	16	2								3				3			3				2		3
2	(2) Matic Voldrih	3		1								2				0		-							0
2	(3) Aleš Kraljic	5			R			0									1		2							2
2	(4) Maks Gregorič	12				3			3				1							2							3
2	(5) Aleksander Čonda	11					3			1				2							2		3
Placing	Team / Rider name	Total	1	2	3	4	5	6	7	8	9	10	11	12	13	14	15	16	17	18	19	20	21	22	23	24	25
3	United States	27	0	3	5	6	6	6	6	9	11	11	13	16	17	19	19	19	20	21	21	22	23	25	27	27	27
3	(1) None	0	N					-					-					-					-
3	(2) Ryan Fisher	9		3				3	0					3					1					2
3	(3) Chris Kerr	11			2					3			2		1					1					2
3	(4) Kenny Ingalls	5				1					2					2		R			0					0
3	(5) Tommy Hedden	2					0					0					0					1	1				0
4	Italy	24	1	1	1	1	2	4	5	5	5	6	6	7	7	8	10	11	11	11	14	17	17	18	21	22	24
4	(1) Mattia Carpanese	11	1						1								2				3				3	1
4	(2) Alessandro Novello	0		0						0			0									-				-
4	(3) Guglielmo Franchetti (c)	7			R						0			1				1				3					2
4	(4) Mattia Cavicchioli	1				0						1			0				R				0
4	(5) Marco Gregnanin	5					1	2								1				0				1
Placing	Team / Rider name	Total	1	2	3	4	5	6	7	8	9	10	11	12	13	14	15	16	17	18	19	20	21	22	23	24	25

M - exclusion for exceeding two minute time allowance • T - exclusion for touching the tapes • X - other exclusion • E - retired or mechanical failure • F - fell

Helmet colours were permanent for each team (red, blue, white and yellow/black). Colours in tables show gate positions:
gate A – inside	gate B	gate C	gate D – outside

=== Qualifying Round Two ===
- 24 May 2010
- GER Abensberg, Bavaria
- Speedwaystadion Abensberg (Length: 398 m)
- Referee: (United Kingdom) Anthony Steele
- Jury President: (Italy) Armando Castagna
- References

Placing	Team / Rider name	Total	1	2	3	4	5	6	7	8	9	10	11	12	13	14	15	16	17	18	19	20	21	22	23	24	25
1	Czech Republic	53	2	3	5	8	9	12	15	17	20	22	24	26	28	29	31	33	34	37	40	42	43	46	48	51	53
1	(1) Aleš Dryml, Jr. (c)	12	2						3								2				3				2
1	(2) Matěj Kůs	10		1						2			2									2				3
1	(3) Lukáš Dryml	11			2						3			2				2									2
1	(4) Martin Málek	9				3						2			2				1				1
1	(5) Zdenek Simota	11					1	3								1				3				3
2	Germany	50	3	6	9	9	11	12	13	16	17	18	19	20	23	25	28	31	34	36	37	40	43	45	45	47	50
2	(1) Martin Smolinski (c)	14	3							3						2			3								3
2	(2) Tobias Kroner	12		3							1						3			2			3
2	(3) Kevin Wölbert	8			3							1	1								1			2
2	(4) Thomas Stange	5				Fx		1						1								3			X
2	(5) Frank Facher	11					2		1						3			3								2
Placing	Team / Rider name	Total	1	2	3	4	5	6	7	8	9	10	11	12	13	14	15	16	17	18	19	20	21	22	23	24	25
3	Latvia	43	1	3	3	5	8	10	12	13	15	18	21	24	25	28	29	30	32	33	35	36	38	39	42	42	43
3	(1) Vjačeslavs Giruckis	6	1								2				1							1		1
3	(2) Maksims Bogdanovs	12		2								3				3		1							3
3	(3) Jevgēņijs Karavackis	5			Fx			2									1		2							F
3	(4) Leonids Paura	9				2			2				3							1							1
3	(5) Ķasts Poudžuks (c)	11					3			1				3							2		2
4	Norway	4	0	0	1	2	2	2	2	2	2	2	2	2	2	2	2	2	2	2	2	2	2	2	3	4	4
4	(1) Kim Rudi Juritzen	0	0					0					0					R					R
4	(2) Tord Solberg	0		0					N					0					0					0			0
4	(3) Marius Tende Røkeberg (c)	2			1					0					0					0					1
4	(4) Stein Roar Pedersen	2				1					0					0					0					1
4	(5) Henrik Bauer Hansen	0					R					N					N					N					-
Placing	Team / Rider name	Total	1	2	3	4	5	6	7	8	9	10	11	12	13	14	15	16	17	18	19	20	21	22	23	24	25

M - exclusion for exceeding two minute time allowance • T - exclusion for touching the tapes • X - other exclusion • E - retired or mechanical failure • F - fell

Helmet colours were permanent for each team (red, blue, white and yellow/black). Colours in tables show gate positions:
gate A – inside	gate B	gate C	gate D – outside

== See also ==
- 2010 Speedway World Cup
