= Finland national under-21 speedway team =

Youth motorcycle speedway team representing Finland

Finland
- Association: Finnish Motorcycling Federation; Suomen Moottoriliitto r.y.
- FIM code: SML
- Team manager: Jyri Palomäki
- Nation colour: Blue and White

World Championships
Team U-21	—	—	—
- Best result: never qualify to the final
Individual U-21	—	—	1
- Best result: 3rd - Ari Koponen (1979)

The Finland national under-21 speedway team is the national under-21 motorcycle speedway team of Finland and is controlled by the Finnish Motorcycling Federation. The team entered the Under-21 World Cup three times, but they never qualified for the final. Ari Koponen is the only Finnish rider to win a medal in Individual U-21 European Championship open for riders from all continents (1979).

== Competition ==
Team Speedway Junior World Championship
Year	Place	Pts.	Riders
2005	—	—	4th place in Qualifying Round Three; Rene Lehtinen (4), Tero Aarnio (2), Joni Keskinen (1), Jani Eerikainen (0), Petteri Koivunen (0)
2006	—	—	4th place in Qualifying Round Two; Rene Lehtinen (2), Joni Keskinen (2), Teemu Lehti (0), Jani Eerikäinen (0), Aarni Heikkilä (0)
2007–2008			Did not enter
2009	—	—	4th place in Qualifying Round Two; Kalle Katajisto (7), Timo Lahti (6), Jari Mäkinen (5), Joni Kitala (1), Aki-Pekka Mustonen (0)
2010	—	—	4th place in Qualifying Round One; Timo Lahti (6), Niko Siltaniemi (3), Kalle Katajisto (3), Jari Makinen (1)

== See also ==
- Finland national speedway team
- Finland national under-19 speedway team
