= 2007 Speedway World Cup Qualification =

Motorcycle speedway events

2007 Speedway World Cup

Seasons
- ← 2006 2008 →

The 2007 Speedway World Cup Qualification (SWC) was a two events of motorcycle speedway meetings used to determine the two national teams who qualify for the 2007 Speedway World Cup. According to the FIM rules the top six nations (Denmark, Sweden, Great Britain, Australia Poland, and United States) from the 2006 Speedway World Cup were automatically qualified. Qualification was won by Finland and Russia teams.

== Results ==
- Qualifying round 1
- (Germany) Abensberg

Pos.	National team	Pts.
1	Finland	43
2	Germany	40
3	Latvia	37
4	Slovenia	29

- Qualifying round 2
- (Italy) Lonigo

Pos.	National team	Pts.
1	Russia	59
2	Czech Republic	46
3	Italy	31
4	Hungary	12

== Heat details ==
=== Abensberg (1) ===
- Qualifying round 1
- 2006-05-28
- (Germany) Abensberg, Motorstadion
- Referee:

Placing	Team / Rider name	Total	1	2	3	4	5	6	7	8	9	10	11	12	13	14	15	16	17	18	19	20	21	22	23	24	25
1	Finland	43	3	6	6	8	8	11	13	14	17	19	20	21	23	25	25	28	30	30	30	33	33	36	39	42	43
1	(1) Kai Laukkanen	14	3								3				2							3		3
1	(2) Joonas Kylmäkorpi	13		3								2				2		3							3
1	(3) Kauko Nieminen	8			0			3									0		2							3
1	(4) Juha Hautamäki	6				2			2				1							0							1
1	(5) Tero Aarnio	2					E			1				1							0		0
2	Germany	40	3	3	6	6	7	8	8	11	13	15	16	17	19	22	25	26	28	30	32	35	37	38	38	38	40
2	(1) Martin Smolinski	13	3							3						3			2								2
2	(2) Thomas Stange	9		E							2						3			2			2
2	(3) Christian Hefenbrock	9			3							2	1								2			1
2	(4) Tobias Kroner	5				E		1						1								3			X
2	(5) Mathias Schultz	4					1		0						2			1								X
Placing	Team / Rider name	Total	1	2	3	4	5	6	7	8	9	10	11	12	13	14	15	16	17	18	19	20	21	22	23	24	25
3	Latvia	37	2	5	7	8	8	8	11	12	13	14	16	19	19	19	21	22	24	25	28	29	31	32	35	37	37
3	(1) Ķasts Poudžuks	14	2						3								2			1	3				3
3	(2) Maksims Bogdanovs	9		3						1			2									1				2
3	(3) Vjačeslavs Giruckis	7			2						1			3				1									X
3	(4) Leonids Paura	6				1						1			0				2				2
3	(5) Aleksandrs Ivanovs	1					0									0				-				1
4	Slovenia	29	2	3	5	6	6	9	11	11	11	11	14	15	18	18	18	21	21	21	21	22	24	27	28	29	29
4	(1) Matej Žagar	16	2					3					3		3			3					2
4	(2) Izak Šantej	8		1					2					1					0			1		3
4	(3) Denis Štojs	3			2					0					-					0					1
4	(4) Jernej Kolenko	2				1					0					0					0					1
4	(5) Maks Gregorič	0					0					0					0					-					0
Placing	Team / Rider name	Total	1	2	3	4	5	6	7	8	9	10	11	12	13	14	15	16	17	18	19	20	21	22	23	24	25

M - exclusion for exceeding two minute time allowance • T - exclusion for touching the tapes • X - other exclusion • E - retired or mechanical failure • F - fell

Helmet colours were permanent for each team (red, blue, white and yellow/black). Colours in tables show gate positions:
gate A – inside	gate B	gate C	gate D – outside

=== Lonigo (2) ===
- Qualifying round 2
- 2006-06-10
- (Italy) Lonigo, Santa Marina Stadium
- Referee: ?

Placing	Team / Rider name	Total	1	2	3	4	5	6	7	8	9	10	11	12	13	14	15	16	17	18	19	20	21	22	23	24	25
1	Russia	59	2	5	8	11	13	16	18	21	22	24	25	27	30	33	36	38	41	42	45	48	49	52	54	57	59
1	(1) Denis Gizatullin	12	2								1				3							3		3
1	(2) Roman Povazhny	12		3								2				3		2							2
1	(3) Emil Sayfutdinov	15			3			3									3		3							3
1	(4) Roman Ivanov	9				3			2				1							1							2
1	(5) Renat Gafurov	11					2			3				2							3		1
2	Czech Republic	46	3	5	7	9	12	14	17	17	20	21	23	26	28	28	29	29	31	33	33	34	36	38	41	43	46
2	(1) Aleš Dryml, Jr.	10	3						3								1				X				3
2	(2) Luboš Tomíček, Jr.	7		2						E			2									1				2
2	(3) Lukáš Dryml	13			2						3			3				E		2							3
2	(4) Zdeněk Simota	9				2						1			2				2				2
2	(5) Josef Franc	7					3	2								0				-				2
Placing	Team / Rider name	Total	1	2	3	4	5	6	7	8	9	10	11	12	13	14	15	16	17	18	19	20	21	22	23	24	25
3	Italy	31	1	2	2	2	2	3	4	4	6	6	9	10	10	12	14	17	17	20	22	24	27	28	29	30	31
3	(1) Andrea Maida	3	1							T						2			E								-
3	(2) Mattia Carpanese	12		1							2						2			3			3			1	?
3	(3) Marco Gregnanin	7			E							0	3								2			1		?	1
3	(4) Guglielmo Franchetti	8				T		1						1				3				2			1
3	(5) Alessandro Milanese	1					0		1						0			-								-
4	Hungary	12	0	0	1	1	2	2	2	4	4	7	7	7	8	9	9	10	11	11	12	12	12	12	12	12	12
4	(1) Sándor Tihanyi	1	0					0					0					1					0
4	(2) Zsolt Bencze	1		0					0					-					1					0		0
4	(3) Norbert Magosi	4			1					2					1					E					0
4	(4) Attila Stefani	2				T					0					1					1					-
4	(5) József Tabaka	4					1					3		0			0					0					0
Placing	Team / Rider name	Total	1	2	3	4	5	6	7	8	9	10	11	12	13	14	15	16	17	18	19	20	21	22	23	24	25

M - exclusion for exceeding two minute time allowance • T - exclusion for touching the tapes • X - other exclusion • E - retired or mechanical failure • F - fell

Helmet colours were permanent for each team (red, blue, white and yellow/black). Colours in tables show gate positions:
gate A – inside	gate B	gate C	gate D – outside

== See also ==
- 2007 Speedway World Cup
