= 2008 Speedway World Cup Qualification =

2008 Speedway World Cup

Seasons
- ← 2007 2009 →

The 2008 Speedway World Cup Qualification (SWC) was two events of motorcycle speedway meetings used to determine the two national teams who qualify for the 2008 Speedway World Cup. According to the FIM rules the top six nations (Poland, Denmark, Australia, Great Britain, Sweden and Russia) from the 2007 Speedway World Cup were automatically qualified. Qualification was won by Hungary and Czech Republic teams.

== Results ==
- Qualifying round 1
- (Hungary) Miskolc

Pos.	National team	Pts.
1	Hungary	51+3
2	Germany	51+e
3	Latvia	36
4	United States	12

- Qualifying round 2
- (Slovenia) Ljubljana

Pos.	National team	Pts.
1	Czech Republic	59
2	Finland	40
3	Slovenia	35
4	Italy	16

== Heat details ==
=== Miskolc (1) ===
Qualifying Round 1

- 25 May 2008 (4:30 pm)
- (Hungary) Miskolc
- Referee: (United Kingdom) Mick Bates
- Jury president: Boris Kotnjek
- Attendance: 3,000

Placing	Team / Rider name	Total	1	2	3	4	5	6	7	8	9	10	11	12	13	14	15	16	17	18	19	20	21	22	23	24	25	26
1	Hungary	51	3	5	7	8	10	12	15	16	19	21	22	25	26	29	31	33	36	36	37	40	41	44	47	49	51
1	(1) Matej Ferján	13	3								3				1							3		3				3
1	(2) Norbert Magosi	12		2								2				3		2							3
1	(3) László Szatmári	11			2			2									2		3							2
1	(4) József Tabaka	7				1			3				1							0							2	style="background-color:" |
1	(5) Sándor Tihanyi	8					2			1				3							1		1
2	Germany	51	2	2	5	7	8	9	11	14	16	19	22	24	27	28	31	34	36	39	41	43	46	47	47	48	51
2	(1) Martin Smolinski	12	2					1					3					3					3
2	(2) Richard Speiser	7		E					2					2					2					1
2	(3) Tobias Kroner	12			3					3					3					3					E			2
2	(4) Kevin Wölbert	8				2					2					1					2					1
2	(5) Christian Hefenbrock	12					1					3					3					2					3	style="background-color:" |
Placing	Team / Rider name	Total	1	2	3	4	5	6	7	8	9	10	11	12	13	14	15	16	17	18	19	20	21	22	23	24	25	26
3	Latvia	36	0	1	2	5	8	11	11	13	14	15	17	17	19	21	22	23	23	25	28	29	29	31	32	35	36
3	(1) Andrejs Koroļevs	0	N						N								-				-				-
3	(2) Kasts Puodžuks	10		1						2			2				1					1				3
3	(3) Jevgeņijs Petuhovs	5			1						1			E				1							1		1	style="background-color:" |
3	(4) Vjačeslavs Giruckis	9				3						1			2				0		3		0
3	(5) Leonīds Paura	12					3	3								2				2				2
4	United States	12	1	4	4	4	4	4	5	5	5	5	5	6	6	6	6	6	7	8	8	8	10	10	12	12	12
4	(1) Billy Janniro	2	1							0						0			1								-
4	(2) Ryan Fisher	6		3							E						0			1			2
4	(3) Shaun Harmatiuk	0			0							0	0								0			0			0
4	(4) Kenny Ingalls	3				0		0						1								0			2
4	(5) Tommy Hedden	1					0		1						0			0								E
Placing	Team / Rider name	Total	1	2	3	4	5	6	7	8	9	10	11	12	13	14	15	16	17	18	19	20	21	22	23	24	25	26

M - exclusion for exceeding two minute time allowance • T - exclusion for touching the tapes • X - other exclusion • E - retired or mechanical failure • F - fell

Helmet colours were permanent for each team (red, blue, white and yellow/black). Colours in tables show gate positions:
gate A – inside	gate B	gate C	gate D – outside

=== Lonigo (2) ===
Qualifying Round 2

- 30 June 2008 (4:20 pm)
- (Slovenia) Ljubljana
- Referee: (United Kingdom) Jim Lawrence
- Jury President: (Poland) Andrzej Grodzki
- Attendance: 500

Placing	Team / Rider name	Total	1	2	3	4	5	6	7	8	9	10	11	12	13	14	15	16	17	18	19	20	21	22	23	24	25
1	Czech Republic	59	3	6	8	11	14	15	18	19	21	23	26	29	32	35	38	38	40	42	43	46	49	51	54	56	59
1	(1) Matěj Kůs	12	3							1						3			2								3
1	(2) Aleš Dryml, Jr.	13		3							2						3			2			3
1	(3) Adrian Rymel	10			2							2	3								1			2
1	(4) Lukáš Dryml	13				3		1						3								3			3
1	(5) Luboš Tomíček, Jr.	11					3		3						3			E								2
2	Finland	40	2	2	3	4	6	9	9	11	12	15	16	18	19	21	22	24	27	28	30	32	34	34	35	38	40
2	(1) Tomi Reima	6	2								1				1							2		0
2	(2) Juha Hautamäki	8		0								3				2		2							1
2	(3) Kauko Nieminen	12			1			3					1				1		3							3
2	(4) Tero Aarnio	4				1			E				-							1							2
2	(5) Kai Laukkanen	10					2			2				2							2		2
Placing	Team / Rider name	Total	1	2	3	4	5	6	7	8	9	10	11	12	13	14	15	16	17	18	19	20	21	22	23	24	25
3	Slovenia	35	0	2	5	5	5	5	7	10	13	13	13	13	15	15	17	20	21	24	27	28	28	31	33	34	35
3	(1) Denis Štojs	0	0					0					0					-					0
3	(2) Izak Šantej	9		2					2					0					1			1		3
3	(3) Matej Žagar	15			3					3					2		2			3					2
3	(4) Maks Gregorič	10				0					3					0		3			3					1
3	(5) Ales Kraljic	1					E					E					-					-					1
4	Italy	16	1	2	2	4	5	7	8	8	8	9	11	12	12	13	13	14	14	14	14	14	15	16	16	16	16
4	(1) Mattia Carpanese	3	1						1					1			0				0				0
4	(2) Alessandro Milanese	4		1						0			2					1				0				0
4	(3) Daniele Tessari	0			0						0			-				-									0
4	(4) Marco Gregnanin	4				2						1			0				0				1
4	(5) Andrea Maida	5					1	2								1				0				1
Placing	Team / Rider name	Total	1	2	3	4	5	6	7	8	9	10	11	12	13	14	15	16	17	18	19	20	21	22	23	24	25

M - exclusion for exceeding two minute time allowance • T - exclusion for touching the tapes • X - other exclusion • E - retired or mechanical failure • F - fell

Helmet colours were permanent for each team (red, blue, white and yellow/black). Colours in tables show gate positions:
gate A – inside	gate B	gate C	gate D – outside

== See also ==
- 2008 Speedway World Cup
