= 2011 Speedway World Cup Qualification =

The 2011 Speedway World Cup Qualification (SWC) was a two events of motorcycle speedway meetings, host in Italy and Germany, used to determine the two national teams who qualify for the 2011 Speedway World Cup. According to the FIM rules the top six nations (Poland, Denmark, Sweden, Great Britain, Australia and Russia) from the 2010 Speedway World Cup were automatically qualified. Qualification was won by Czech Republic and Germany teams.

== Results ==
- Qualifying Round One
- (Italy) Lonigo
- 17 April 2011

Pos.	National team	Pts
1	Czech Republic	49
2	Slovenia	44
3	Latvia	39
4	Italy	17

- Qualifying Round Two
- (Germany) Landshut
- 7 May 2011

Pos.	National team	Pts
1	Germany	47
2	United States	39
3	Finland	38
4	Ukraine	26

== Heat details ==
=== Qualifying Round One ===
- 17 April 2010
- ITA Lonigo, Veneto
- Pista Santa Marina (Length: 334 m)
- Referee: (United Kingdom) Craig Ackroyd
- Jury President: (Denmark) Jorgen L. Jensen
- References

Placing	Team / Rider Name	Total	1	2	3	4	5	6	7	8	9	10	11	12	13	14	15	16	17	18	19	20	21	22	23	24	25
1	Czech Republic	49	0	3	5	7	9	11	12	14	17	19	20	22	24	27	30	31	34	37	38	38	41	43	44	46	49
1	(1) Lukáš Dryml	11	F2							2						3			3								3
1	(2) Aleš Dryml, Jr. (c)	15		3							3						3			3			3
1	(3) Filip Šitera	8			2							2	1								1			2
1	(4) Zdeněk Simota	7				2		2						2								0			1
1	(5) Matěj Kůs	8					2		1						2			1								2
2	Slovenia	44	3	4	7	10	10	11	14	17	19	20	22	25	26	26	28	30	31	32	35	37	37	38	41	44	44
2	(1) Matej Žagar (c)	14	3						3								2				3				3
2	(2) Aleksander Čonda	11		1						3			2									2				3
2	(3) Ales Kraljic	10			3						2			3				2									R
2	(4) Matic Voldrih	6				3						1			1				1				Fx
2	(5) Matija Duh	3					0	1								Fx				1				1
Placing	Team / Rider Name	Total	1	2	3	4	5	6	7	8	9	10	11	12	13	14	15	16	17	18	19	20	21	22	23	24	25
3	Latvia	39	1	1	2	2	5	5	7	8	9	12	15	16	19	21	21	24	26	26	28	31	31	34	36	37	39
3	(1) Maksims Bogdanovs	13	1						2		1				3							3		3
3	(2) Kasts Puodzuks (c)	13		0								3	3			2		3							2
3	(3) Vjačeslavs Giruckis	4			1			F									0		2							1
3	(4) Jevgēņijs Karavackis	0				0			-				-							F							-
3	(5) Andzejs Lebedevs	9					3			1				1							2		Fx				2
4	Italy	17	2	4	4	5	6	9	9	9	9	9	9	9	9	10	11	11	11	13	13	14	16	16	16	16	17
4	(1) Guglielmo Franchetti (c)	7	2					3					0		0			Fx					2
4	(2) Mattia Carpanese	2		2					0					0					R		R			0
4	(3) Cristian Carrica	2			0					0					-					2					0
4	(4) Nicolas Covatti	2				1					F					1					-					0
4	(5) Marco Gregnanin	4					1					0					1					1					1
Placing	Team / Rider Name	Total	1	2	3	4	5	6	7	8	9	10	11	12	13	14	15	16	17	18	19	20	21	22	23	24	25

M - exclusion for exceeding two minute time allowance • T - exclusion for touching the tapes • X - other exclusion • E - retired or mechanical failure • F - fell

Helmet colours was permanent for each teams (Red, Blue, White and Yellow/Black). Colours in diagrams means gate positions:
gate A – inside	gate B	gate C	gate D – outside

=== Qualifying Round Two ===
- 7 May 2010
- (Germany) Landshut, Bavaria
- Speedway Stadion Ellermühle (Length: 392 m)
- Referee: (United Kingdom) Michael Bates
- Jury President: (Finland) Ilkka Teromaa
- References

Placing	Team / Rider Name	Total	1	2	3	4	5	6	7	8	9	10	11	12	13	14	15	16	17	18	19	20	21	22	23	24	25
1	Germany	47	3	6	9	11	12	14	14	15	16	16	19	22	23	25	25	28	31	34	35	36	39	40	43	44	47
1	(1) Martin Smolinski (c)	14	3					2					3					3					3
1	(2) Christian Hefenbrock	10		3					0					3					3					1
1	(3) Frank Facher	11			3					1					1					3					3
1	(4) Mathias Schultz	7				2					1					2					1					1
1	(5) Tobias Kroner	5					1					0					0					1					3
2	United States	39	1	2	4	5	5	8	11	11	13	15	16	16	19	19	20	21	23	24	27	29	30	33	34	37	39
2	(1) Greg Hancock (c)	12	1								2				3							2	1	3
2	(2) Ricky Wells	5		1								2				0		1							1
2	(3) Ryan Fisher	14			2			3									1		2		3					3
2	(4) Tyson Burmeister	8				1			3				1							1							2
2	(5) Mike Buman	0					0			0				0							-		-
Placing	Team / Rider Name	Total	1	2	3	4	5	6	7	8	9	10	11	12	13	14	15	16	17	18	19	20	21	22	23	24	25
3	Finland	38	2	4	5	5	8	8	10	13	13	14	16	17	19	22	25	27	28	30	32	32	34	36	36	38	38
3	(1) Joonas Kylmäkorpi (c)	9	2							3						3			1								R
3	(2) Tero Aarnio	9		2							0						3			2			2
3	(3) Juha Hautamäki	8			1							1	2								2			2
3	(4) Kalle Katajisto	1				0		0						1								0			N
3	(5) Kauko Nieminen	11					3		2						2			2								2
4	Ukraine	26	0	0	0	3	5	6	7	9	12	15	15	17	17	18	20	20	20	20	20	23	23	23	25	25	26
4	(1) Andriy Kobrin (c)	5	0						1								2				0		0		2
4	(2) Stanislav Ogorodnik	0		0						-			0									-				0
4	(3) Kyryl Tsukanov	9			0						3			2				0				3					1
4	(4) Aleksandr Loktaev	6				3						3			0				0				-
4	(5) Yaroslav Poliuhovich	6					2	1		2						1				0				0
Placing	Team / Rider Name	Total	1	2	3	4	5	6	7	8	9	10	11	12	13	14	15	16	17	18	19	20	21	22	23	24	25

M - exclusion for exceeding two minute time allowance • T - exclusion for touching the tapes • X - other exclusion • E - retired or mechanical failure • F - fell

Helmet colours was permanent for each teams (Red, Blue, White and Yellow/Black). Colours in diagrams means gate positions:
gate A – inside	gate B	gate C	gate D – outside

== See also ==
- 2011 Speedway World Cup
