= 2009 Speedway World Cup Qualification =

2009 Speedway World Cup

Seasons
- ← 2008 2010 →

The 2009 Speedway World Cup Qualification (SWC) was a two events of motorcycle speedway meetings used to determine the two national teams who qualify for the 2009 Speedway World Cup. According to the FIM rules the top six nations (Denmark, Poland, Sweden, Australia, Great Britain and Russia) from the 2008 Speedway World Cup were automatically qualified.

== Results ==
- Qualifying Round 1
- (Italy) Terenzano

Pos.	National team	Pts.
1	Slovenia	51+3
2	Germany	51+2
3	Italy	26
4	Hungary	22

- Qualifying Round 2
- (Latvia) Daugavpils

Pos.	National team	Pts.
1	Czech Republic	48
2	Latvia	45
3	Finland	29
4	United States	26

== Heat details ==
=== Qualifying Round 1 ===
- 2 May 2009 (21:00)
- (Italy) Terenzano, Pista "Olimpia" (Length: 400 m)
- Referee: (Germany) Christian Froschauer
- Jury President: (Hungary) Janos Nadasdi
- Attendance:

Placing	Team / Rider name	Total	1	2	3	4	5	6	7	8	9	10	11	12	13	14	15	16	17	18	19	20	21	22	23	24	25	26
1	Slovenia	51	3	6	6	9	11	13	15	16	19	22	23	25	25	28	30	31	33	35	38	41	42	45	47	50	51
1	(1) Matej Žagar (c)	14	3								3				X				2			3		3				3
1	(2) Denis Štojs	12		3								3				3		1							2
1	(3) Izak Šantej	7			0			2									2		-							3
1	(4) Maks Gregorič	9				3			2				1							2							1	style="background-color:" |
1	(5) Aleksander Čonda	9					2			1				2							3		1
2	Germany	51	0	2	4	6	9	12	15	18	20	22	24	27	30	32	35	38	41	44	44	46	48	49	49	49	51
2	(1) Martin Smolinski (c)	10	0					3					2					3					2					2
2	(2) Tobias Kroner	12		2					3					3					3					1
2	(3) Christian Hefenbrock	11			2					3					3					3					0
2	(4) Richard Speiser	6				2					2					2					Fx					N
2	(5) Thomas Stange	12					3					2					3					2					2	style="background-color:" |
Placing	Team / Rider name	Total	1	2	3	4	5	6	7	8	9	10	11	12	13	14	15	16	17	18	19	20	21	22	23	24	25	26
3	Italy	26	2	2	5	5	6	7	8	8	9	9	12	12	14	15	16	16	17	17	18	18	21	21	24	26	26
3	(1) Mattia Tadiello	7	2							0						1			1						3		X
3	(2) Mattia Cavicchioli	2		T							1						1			F			-
3	(3) Guglielmo Franchetti	7			3							0	3								1			F
3	(4) Andrea Baroni	1				0		1						0								0			-
3	(5) Mattia Carpanese (c)	9					1		1						2			0					3			2
4	Hungary	22	1	2	3	4	4	4	4	6	6	7	7	8	9	9	9	11	11	12	14	15	15	17	18	19	22
4	(1) László Szatmári (c)	4	1						0								0				2				1
4	(2) Norbert Magosi	5		1						2			X									1				1
4	(3) József Tabaka	9			1						X			1				2						2			3	style="background-color:" |
4	(4) Roland Kovács	3				1						1			1				0				0
4	(5) Attila Lőrincz	1					0	0								0				1				-
Placing	Team / Rider name	Total	1	2	3	4	5	6	7	8	9	10	11	12	13	14	15	16	17	18	19	20	21	22	23	24	25	26

M - exclusion for exceeding two minute time allowance • T - exclusion for touching the tapes • X - other exclusion • E - retired or mechanical failure • F - fell

Helmet colours were permanent for each team (red, blue, white and yellow/black). Colours in tables show gate positions:
gate A – inside	gate B	gate C	gate D – outside

=== Qualifying Round 2 ===
- 2 May 2009 (18:15)
- (Latvia) Daugavpils, Lokomotīve Stadium (Length: 373 m)
- Referee: (United Kingdom) Mick Bates
- Jury President: (Poland) Andrzej Grodzki
- Attendance:

Placing	Team / Rider name	Total	1	2	3	4	5	6	7	8	9	10	11	12	13	14	15	16	17	18	19	20	21	22	23	24	25
1	Czech Republic	48	1	4	6	8	10	10	13	16	19	21	22	25	27	30	33	33	35	37	40	43	43	43	46	46	48
1	(1) Aleš Dryml, Jr. (c)	13	1						3								3				3				3
1	(2) Adrian Rymel	10		3						3			1									3				X
1	(3) Lukáš Dryml	10			2						3			3				0									2
1	(4) Luboš Tomíček, Jr.	8				2						2			2				2				0
1	(5) Matěj Kůs	7					2	0								3				2				0
2	Latvia	45	0	1	4	7	8	10	12	14	14	17	19	19	19	21	23	24	27	30	32	34	36	38	39	42	45
2	(1) Vjačeslavs Giruckis	0	0								Fx				-							-		-
2	(2) Leonids Paura	10		1								3				2		1				2			1
2	(3) Ķasts Poudžuks (c)	15			3			2									2		3					2		3
2	(4) Maksims Bogdanovs	13				3			2				2		Fx					3							3
2	(5) Jevgēņijs Karavackis	7					1			2				0							2		2
Placing	Team / Rider name	Total	1	2	3	4	5	6	7	8	9	10	11	12	13	14	15	16	17	18	19	20	21	22	23	24	25
3	Finland	29	2	4	4	5	8	9	9	10	11	12	12	14	17	17	17	20	21	21	22	23	24	27	27	29	29
3	(1) Kalle Katajisto	3	2							1						Fx			-								-
3	(2) Tomi Reima	3		2							1						-			Fx			-				Fx
3	(3) Juha Hautamäki	6			0							1	E						1		1			3
3	(4) Kai Laukkanen	5				1		1						2			E					1			E
3	(5) Kauko Nieminen (c)	12					3		0						3			3					1			2
4	United States	26	3	3	4	4	4	7	8	8	10	10	13	14	14	15	16	18	18	19	19	19	22	23	25	26	26
4	(1) Greg Hancock (c)	14	3					3					3					2					3
4	(2) Ryan Fisher	3		0					1					1					F					1
4	(3) Chris Kerr	4			1					0					Fx					1					2
4	(4) Ricky Wells	4				0					2					1					Fx					1
4	(5) Kenny Ingalls	1					0					0					1					F					Fx
Placing	Team / Rider name	Total	1	2	3	4	5	6	7	8	9	10	11	12	13	14	15	16	17	18	19	20	21	22	23	24	25

M - exclusion for exceeding two minute time allowance • T - exclusion for touching the tapes • X - other exclusion • E - retired or mechanical failure • F - fell

Helmet colours were permanent for each team (red, blue, white and yellow/black). Colours in tables show gate positions:
gate A – inside	gate B	gate C	gate D – outside

== See also ==
- 2009 Speedway World Cup
