= Finnish Individual Speedway Championship =

Motorcycle speedway championship

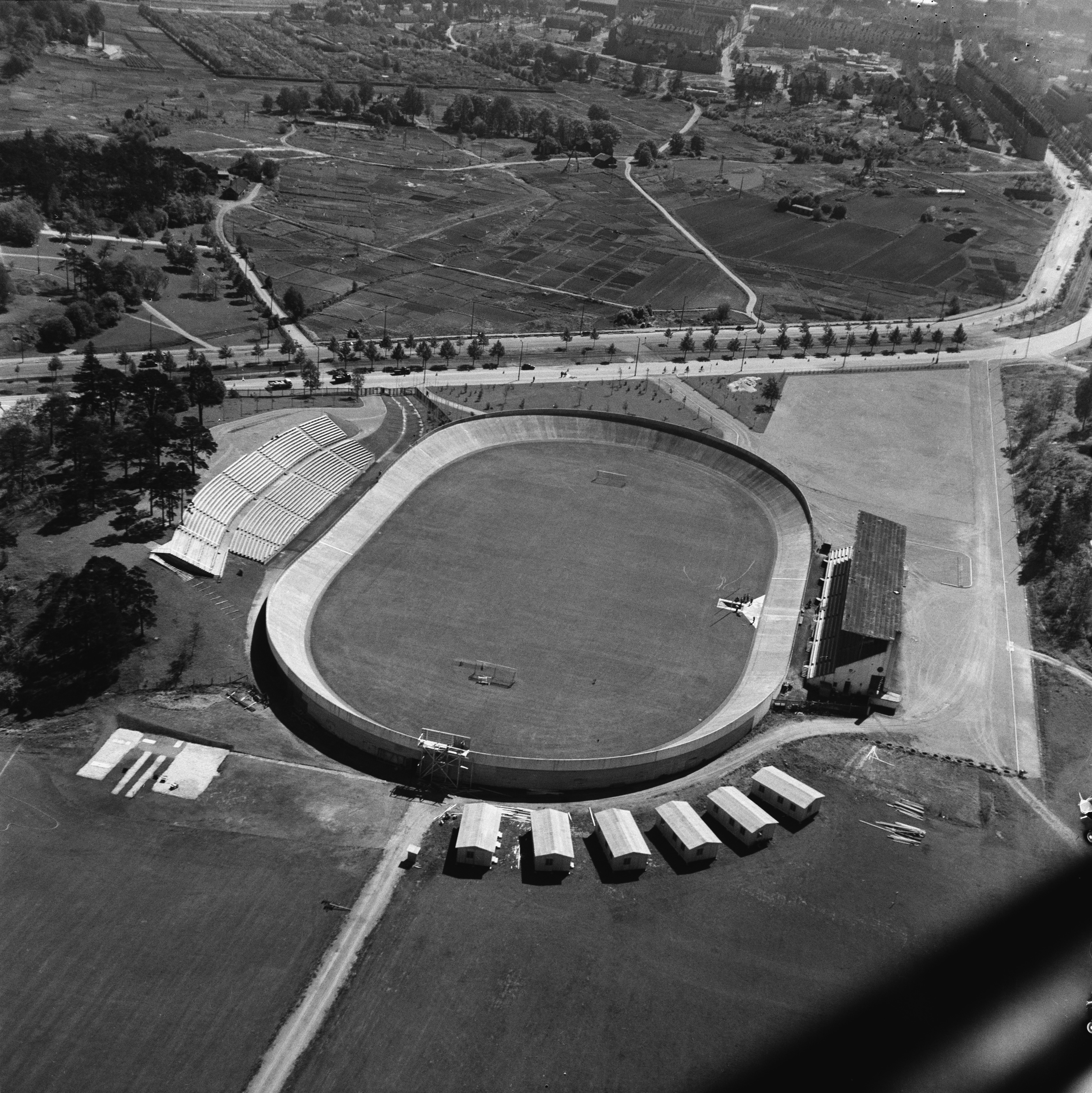
- Helsinki Velodrome (pictured in 1952) was the first championship venue in 1955
- Sport: Motorcycle speedway
- Founded: 1955
- Most titles: Kai Niemi (9)

The Finnish Individual Speedway Championship is a Motorcycle speedway championship held each year to determine the Finnish national champion. It was first staged in 1955.

The final of the Finnish Championship regularly doubled up as the Finnish qualification round for the Speedway World Championship.

If the Finnish final was held in the Summer months, the qualification would be for the following year's World Championship.

== Key ==
- Unless stated, all riders are from Finland
- (nwc) indicates that it was not a world championship qualifier

== Past winners ==
Year	Venue	Winner	2nd	3rd
1955	Helsinki Velodrome	Kauko Jousanen	Antti Pajari	Simo Ylanen
1956	Turku Hippodrome	Antti Pajari	Simo Ylanen	Kauko Jousanen
1957	Helsinki Velodrome	Antti Pajari	Aulis Tuominen	Kauko Jousanen
1958	Turku Hippodrome	Antti Pajari	Timo Laine	Kauko Jousanen
1959	Eteläpuisto Tampere	Pertti Mikkola	Kalevi Lahtinen	Olavi Turunen
1960	Eteläpuisto Tampere	Kalevi Lahtinen	Olavi Turunen	Timo Laine
1961	Turku Hippodrome	Timo Laine	Kalevi Lahtinen	Mika Helminen
1962	Eteläpuisto Tampere	Timo Laine	Kalevi Lahtinen	Esko Koponen
1963	Kärpänen Speedway, Lahti	Timo Laine	Kalevi Lahtinen	Matti Olin
1964	Kärpänen Speedway, Lahti	Kalevi Lahtinen	Timo Laine	Matti Olin
1965	Kärpänen Speedway, Lahti	Kalevi Lahtinen	Matti Olin	Heikki Karpali
1966	(2 rounds)	Olavi Turunen	Matti Olin	Kalevi Lahtinen
1967	(2 rounds)	Matti Olin	Reima Lohkovuori	Veikko Metsahvone
1968	(2 rounds)	Matti Olin	Reima Lohkovuori	Jouko Naskali
1969	(2 rounds)	Kalevi Lahtinen	Matti Olin	Timo Laine
1970	(2 rounds)	Kalevi Lahtinen	Matti Olin	Jouko Naskali
1971	(3 rounds)	Matti Olin	Kalevi Lahtinen	Hannu Kankanen
1972	(3 rounds)	Matti Olin	Hannu Kankanen	Kalevi Lahtinen
1973	Turku Hippodrome	Matti Olin	Ilkka Teromaa	Reino Santala
1974	Eteläpuisto Tampere	Kari Vuoristo	Matti Olin	Veli P. Teromaa
1975	Kärpänen Speedway, Lahti	Ilkka Teromaa	Kai Niemi	Olli Turkia
1976	Turku Hippodrome	Ilkka Teromaa	Veli P. Teromaa	Mark Helminen
1977	Eteläpuisto Tampere	Kai Niemi	Ilkka Teromaa	Rauli Makinen
1978	Kärpänen Speedway, Lahti	Kai Niemi	Rauli Mäkinen	Matti Väyrynen
1979	Eteläpuisto Tampere	Kai Niemi	Ilkka Teromaa	Veijo Tuoriniemi
1980	Pippo Speedway, Lahti	Kai Niemi	Ari Koponen	Veijo Tuoriniemi
1981	Eteläpuisto Tampere	Kai Niemi	Pekka Hautamaki	Veijo Tuoriniemi
1982	Iinat Motor Sports Center, Oulu	Kai Niemi	Ari Koponen	Olli Tyrväinen
1983	Yyterin speedwaystadion, Pori	Ari Koponen	Juha Moksunen	Olli Tyrväinen
1984	Eteläpuisto Tampere	Kai Niemi	Ari Koponen	Juha Moksunen
1985	Varkaus Speedway Stadion	Ari Koponen	Juha Moksunen	Roy Malminheim
1986	Seinäjoki Speedway (nwc)	Juha Moksunen	Ari Koponen	Roy Malminheim
1987	Pippo Speedway, Lahti	Ari Koponen	Vesa Ylinen	Roy Malminheim
1988	Kotkan Motor Center, Karhula	Kai Niemi	Ari Koponen	Vesa Ylinen
1989	Kaanaa Speedway, Tampere	Juha Moksunen	Olli Tyrväinen	Kai Niemi
1990	Pippo Speedway, Lahti (nwc)	Kai Niemi	Olli Tyrväinen	Aki A. Riihimaki
1991	Yyterin speedwaystadion, Pori	Vesa Ylinen	Juha Moksunen	Mika Pellinen
1992	Vauhtipuisto, Hyvinkää	Vesa Ylinen	Roy Malminheim	Arto Orjo
1993	Kaanaa Speedway, Tampere	Mika Pellinen	Petri Nurmesniemi	Kai Laukkanen
1994	Seinäjoki Speedway	Roy Malminheim	Marko Hyyrylainen	Kai Laukkanen
1995	Varkaus Speedway Stadion	Vesa Ylinen	Kai Laukkanen	Marko Jumisko
1996	3 rounds	Vesa Ylinen	Marko Hyyrylainen	Pasi Pulliainen
1997	Yyterin speedwaystadion, Pori	Kai Laukkanen	Marko Jumisko	Petri Vaatsio
1998	Seinäjoki Speedway	Vesa Ylinen	Kai Laukkanen	Tommy Reima
1999	Kaanaa Speedway, Tampere	Kai Laukkanen	Tommy Reima	Vesa Ylinen
2000	Yyterin speedwaystadion, Pori	Kai Laukkanen	Kauko Nieminen	Toni Salmela
2001	Seinäjoki Speedway	Kai Laukkanen	Kauko Nieminen	Toni Salmela
2002	Varkaus Speedway Stadion	Kai Laukkanen	Kauko Nieminen	Joonas Kylmäkorpi
2003	Seinäjoki Speedway	Kai Laukkanen	Kauko Nieminen	Tommy Reima
2004	Seinäjoki Speedway	Kai Laukkanen	Juha Hautamäki	Tero Aarnio
2005	3 rounds	Juha Hautamäki	Kai Laukkanen	Tero Aarnio
2006	Seinäjoki Speedway	Kai Laukkanen	Juha Hautamäki	Kauko Nieminen
2007	Kuusankoski Speedway	Juha Hautamäki	Kai Laukkanen	Jyri Palomaki
2008	Haapajärvi Speedway	Juha Hautamäki	Kai Laukkanen	Appe Mustonen
2009	Yyterin speedwaystadion, Pori	Kauko Nieminen	Kai Laukkanen	Kalle Katajisto
2010	Kauhajoki Speedway	Kauko Nieminen	Tero Aarnio	Niko Siltani
2011	Haapajärvi Speedway	Kauko Nieminen	Juha Hautamäki	Tero Aarnio
2012	Seinäjoki Speedway	Timo Lahti	Kauko Nieminen	Juha Hautamäki
2013	Vauhtipuisto, Hyvinkää	Juha Hautamäki	Marko Suojanen	Tero Aarnio
2014	Seinäjoki Speedway	Jari Mäkinen	Juha Hautamäki	Kauko Nieminen
2015	Haapajärvi Speedway	Timo Lahti	Juha Hautamäki	Teemu Lahti
2016	Vauhtipuisto, Hyvinkää	Timo Lahti	Kauko Nieminen	Joa Partan
2017	Seinäjoki Speedway	Timo Lahti	Joa Partan	Teemu Lahti
2018	Haapajärvi Speedway	Timo Lahti	Tero Aarnio	Antti Vuolas
2019	Yyterin speedwaystadion, Pori	Timo Lahti	Jesse Mustonen	Teemu Lahti
2020	Seinäjoki Speedway	Tero Aarnio	Jesse Mustonen	Timi Salonen
2021	Vauhtipuisto, Hyvinkää	Timo Lahti	Jesse Mustonen	Tero Aarnio
2022	Kaanaa Speedway, Tampere	Jesse Mustonen	Timi Salonen	Antti Vuolas
2023	Haapajärvi Speedway	Jesse Mustonen	Niklas Säyriö	Henri Ahlbom

== See also ==
Finland national speedway team
