= 2018 Individual Speedway Junior European Championship =

Motorcycle racing competition

The 2018 European Individual Speedway Junior Championship (also known as the 2018 Speedway European Under 21 Championship) was the 21st edition of the Championship.

The final was staged at Stralsund in Germany and was won by Dominik Kubera of Poland.

The U19 final was staged at Varkaus in Finland and was won by Mads Hansen of Denmark.

== Under 21 ==
=== Final ===
- 14 September 2018
- (Germany) Paul Greifzu Stadium, Stralsund

Pos.	Rider	Points	Details
1	(Poland) Dominik Kubera	14	(3, 3, 3, 2, 3)
2	(Poland) Wiktor Lampart	13	(3, 2, 2, 3, 3)
3	(Denmark) Frederik Jakobsen	12	(1, 2, 3, 3, 3)
4	(Denmark) Andreas Lyager	11	(1, 2, 3, 3, 2)
5	(Latvia) Oļegs Mihailovs	11	(3, 3, 2, 2, 1)
6	(Sweden) Joel Kling	9	(3, 0, 3, 3, 0)
7	(Poland) Viktor Trofimov	8	(2, 2, 2, X, 2)
8	(Denmark) Christian Thaysen	7	(0, 3, 1, 1, 2)
9	(Poland) Igor Kopec-Sobczynski	7	(2, 1, 0, 1, 3)
10	(Norway) Lasse Fredriksen	6	(1, 1, 2, 1, 1)
11	(Russia) Arslan Fayzulin	6	(2, 1, 1, 2, 0)
12	(Germany) Lukas Fienhage	5	(0, 3, 1, 1, 0)
13	(Poland) Hubert Czerniawski	3	(0, 0, 0, 2, 1)
14	(Czech Republic) Jan Kvěch	3	(1, 1, R, 0, 1)
15	(Denmark) Patrick Hansen	2	(2, 0, X, NS, NS)
16	(Poland) Patryk Wojdylo	2	(0, X, 0, 0, 2)

== Under 19 ==
The final was staged at the Varkaus Speedway Stadion in Varkaus, Finland and was won by Mads Hansen of Denmark.

=== Final ===
- 11 August 2018
- (Finland) Varkaus

Pos.	Rider	Points	Details
1	(Denmark) Mads Hansen	14	(3,3,3,2,3)
2	(Poland) Szymon Szlauderbach	12	(3,t,3,3,3)
3	(Latvia) Oļegs Mihailovs	11	(2,3,in,3,3)
4	(Denmark) Jonas Seifert-Salk	10	(3,1,1,3,2)
5	(Poland) Alan Szczotka	10	(1,3,2,3,1)
6	(Finland) Niklas Sayrio	9	(1,2,3,2,1)
7	(Czech Republic) Jan Kvěch	9	(3,1,2,1,2)
8	(Poland) Kamil Nowacki	8	(2,3,1,2,0)
9	(England) Tom Brennan	7	(2,0,3,2,w)
10	(Latvia) Artem Trofimov	7	(1,2,2,1,1)
11	(Slovakia) David Pacalaj	6	(2,1,d,1,2)
12	(Ukraine) Marko Levishyn	5	(w,2,d,u,3)
13	(Finland) Timi Salonen	5	(0,0,2,1,2)
14	(Italy) Mattia Lenarduzzi	4	(1,2,1,ns,ns)
15	(Czech Republic) Petr Chlupáč	2	(0,t,1,0,1)
16	(Sweden) Alexander Woentin	0	(w,-,-,-,-)
17	(Sweden) William Bjoerling	0	(u,ns,ns,ns,ns)

== See also ==
- 2018 Speedway European Championship
