= Hautamäki =

Hautamäki is a Finnish surname. Notable people with the surname include:

- Costello Hautamäki (born 1963), Finnish musician and composer
- Erkki Hautamäki (born 1930), Finnish historian
- Juha Hautamäki (born 1982), Finnish motorcycle speedway rider
- Jussi Hautamäki (born 1979), Finnish ski jumper
- Matti Hautamäki (born 1981), Finnish ski jumper
- Pekka Hautamäki (born 1955), Finnish motorcycle speedway rider
- Sami Hautamäki, Finnish sport shooter
