= Jesse Mustonen =

Finnish speedway rider

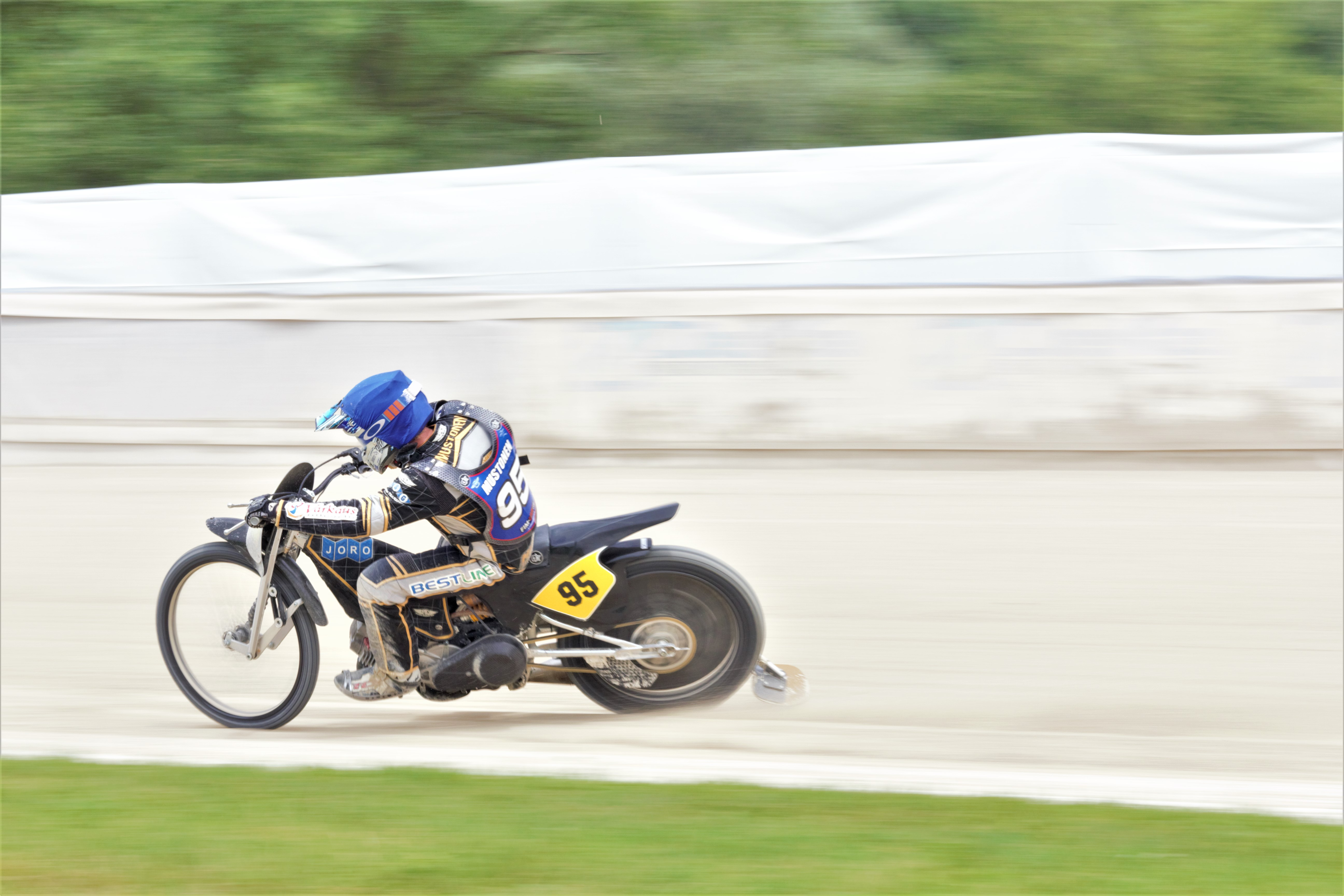
- Born: 24 November 1995 (age 30); Varkaus, Finland
- Nationality: Finnish

Career history

Sweden
- 2020–2025: Valsarna

Denmark
- 2022: Slangerup

Poland
- 2020: Daugavpils
- 2024: Gorzów
- 2025: Kraków

Individual honours
- 2022, 2023: Finnish national Champion

Team honours
- 2015: Long Track Team World Cup bronze
- 2023: European Pairs bronze

Jesse Mustonen (24 November 1995) is a Finnish motorcycle speedway rider.

== Career ==
Mustonen started his career mainly as a longtrack rider and he reached the final of the 2014 Team Long Track World Championship, where Finland finished fourth just outside the medal placings. He continued to represent Finland and won a bronze medal the following year at the 2015 Team Long Track World Championship and despite top scoring for Finland in 2016 and 2017 they were placed outside the medals.

In the Individual Speedway Long Track World Championship, Mustonen reached the final five years running from 2016 to 2020 and managed a best place finish of 8th.

Mustonen represented Finland at the 2019 Speedway of Nations and again at the 2022 Speedway of Nations. Also in 2022, he became the national champion of Finland after winning the Finnish Individual Speedway Championship.

In 2023, Mustonen won a second national title, was part of the Finland team that competed at the 2023 Speedway World Cup in Poland and won a bronze medal at the European Pairs championship.

Mustonen represented Finland during the 2024 Speedway of Nations.

== See also ==
- Finland national speedway team
