= Kai Niemi =

Finnish speedway rider

- Born: 15 September 1955 (age 71); Pori, Finland
- Nationality: Finnish

Career history

Great Britain
- 1976–1978: White City Rebels
- 1979–1981: Eastbourne Eagles
- 1981: Birmingham Brummies
- 1982–1983: Wimbledon Dons
- 1984–1985, 1986–1988: Ipswich Witches
- 1986: Swindon Robins
- 1989: Coventry Bees

Sweden
- 1987–1988: Örnarna

Individual honours
- 1977, 1978, 1979 1980, 1981, 1982 1984, 1988, 1990: Finland National Champion
- 1982: London Riders' Champion

Team honours
- 1977, 1984: British League Champion
- 1984: British League KO Cup winner

Kai Juhani Niemi (born 15 September 1955) is a Finnish former motorcycle speedway rider. He was the champion of Finland on a record nine occasions and earned 22 international caps for the Finland national speedway team.

== Career ==
Niemi was born on 15 September 1955 in Pori, Finland. He reached four World Championship finals, finishing a career best fourth in 1985 at the Odsal Stadium in Bradford, England. The performance in 1985 from a rider from the minor nations of speedway came as a surprise to many and he was level on points with three other riders leading into the last set of heats but was unable to score in heat 17, which resulted in a fourth place finish.

Niemi won the Finnish National Championship a record nine times during his career (1977, 1978, 1979, 1980, 1981, 1982, 1984, 1988 and 1990).

Niemi rode for the White City Rebels in the British League from 1976 to 1978, winning the league championship with the team in 1977. He continued riding in Britain until 1986 for other teams including: Eastbourne Eagles (1979–81), Birmingham Brummies (1981), Wimbledon Dons (1982–83), Ipswich Witches (1984-85) and the Swindon Robins (1986).

In 1982, Niemi won the London Riders' Championship with Wimbledon. He also won the British League Knockout Cup in 1984 with Ipswich.

Niemi also rode for Finland in the World Pairs Final on five occasions with a best finish of fifth in Australia in 1982 with his brother-in-law Ari Koponen, and again in 1989 in Poland with Olli Tyrväinen. He also represented Finland in the World Team Cup, though the Fins never progressed past the Semi-final stage during his career.

In 1989, Niemi rode in 42 matches for Coventry Bees with an average of 5.06. Kai was bought in as a replacement for David Clarke, who left Coventry to join Cradley Heath Heathens.

== World Final appearances ==
=== Individual World Championship ===
- 1980 – (Sweden) Gothenburg, Ullevi - 8th - 8pts
- 1982 – (United States) Los Angeles, Memorial Coliseum - 12th - 5pts
- 1984 – (Sweden) Gothenburg, Ullevi - 12th - 4pts
- 1985 – (England) Bradford, Odsal Stadium - 4th - 10pts

=== World Pairs Championship ===
- 1977 – (England) Manchester, Hyde Road (with Ila Teromaa) - 6th - 14pts (7)
- 1979 – (Denmark) Vojens, Vojens Speedway Center (with Ila Teromaa) - 7th - 7pts (7)
- 1980 – (Socialist Federal Republic of Yugoslavia) Krško, Matija Gubec Stadium (with Ila Teromaa) - 6th - 14pts (6)
- 1982 – (Australia) Sydney, Liverpool City Raceway (with Ari Koponen) - 5th - 16pts (12)
- 1987 – (Czech Republic) Pardubice, Svítkov Stadion (with Olli Tyrväinen) – 6th – 19 pts (8)
- 1989 – (Poland) Leszno, Alfred Smoczyk Stadium (with Olli Tyrväinen) - 5th - 31pts (18)
- 1990 – (West Germany) Landshut, Ellermühle Stadium (with Olli Tyrväinen) - 5th - 31pts
