= Olli Tyrväinen =

Finnish speedway rider

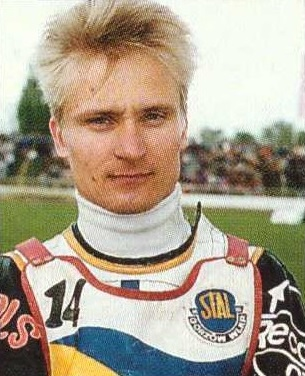
- Born: 11 January 1960 (age 66); Varkaus, Finland
- Nationality: Finnish

Career history

Great Britain
- 1981, 1984, 1992: Eastbourne Eagles
- 1988: Bradford Dukes
- 1988: Sheffield Tigers

Sweden
- 1983: Piraterna
- 1985-1997: Smederna

Poland
- 1991: Stal Gorzów

Individual honours
- 1989: Speedway World Championship finalist

Team honours
- 1989, 1992: Allsvenskan Div 1 Champion

Olli Tyrväinen (born 11 January 1960) is a Finnish former international speedway rider. He earned 19 caps for the Finland national speedway team.

== Speedway career ==
Tyrväinen reached the final of the Speedway World Championship in the 1989 Individual Speedway World Championship.

Tyrväinen rode in the top tier of British Speedway from 1981-1992, riding for various clubs, the first of which was Eastbourne Eagles. He joined Bradford Dukes in 1988.

Tyrväinen has twice won the silver medal and twice won the bronze medal in the Finnish Individual Speedway Championship.

== World final appearances ==
=== Individual World Championship ===
- 1989 - (Germany) Munich, Olympic Stadium - 13th - 4pts

=== World Pairs Championship ===
- 1987 - (Czech Republic) Pardubice, Svítkov Stadion (with Kai Niemi) - 6th - 19 pts (11)
- 1989 - (Poland) Leszno, Alfred Smoczyk Stadium (with Kai Niemi) - 5th - 31pts
- 1990 - (West Germany) Landshut, Ellermühle Stadium (with Kai Niemi) - 5th - 31pts
