= Veijo Tuoriniemi =

Norwegian speedway rider

- Born: 7 April 1958; Lahti, Finland
- Died: 9 January 2018 (aged 59)
- Nationality: Finnish

Career history

Great Britain
- 1979–1980: Eastbourne Eagles
- 1981: Swindon Robins

Sweden
- 1983–1984: Skepparna

Individual honours
- 1982, 1983, 1984, 1985: Finnish Longtrack Champion
- 1979, 1980, 1981: Finnish Championship bronze medal

Veijo Tuoriniemi (7 April 1958 – 9 January 2018) was a motorcycle speedway rider from Finland. He earned 3 caps for the Finland national speedway team.

== Career ==
Tuoriniemi made his British leagues debut in 1979 following his military service, when he joined Eastbourne for the 1979 British League season. The same season he won the first of three bronze medals in the Finnish Individual Speedway Championship.

In 1980, Tuoriniemi continued to ride for Eastbourne and improved his average considerably. The following season he moved to ride for the Swindon Robins during the 1981 British League season.

Also in 1981, Tuoriniemi represented the Finland national speedway team during the 1981 Speedway World Team Cup.

Tuoriniemi concentrated on longtrack speedway in the following years and won the Finnish Longtrack Championship for four successive years from 1982 to 1985.
