= 1980 Speedway World Pairs Championship =

11th edition of the World motorcycle speedway Pairs Championship

1980 World Pairs Championship
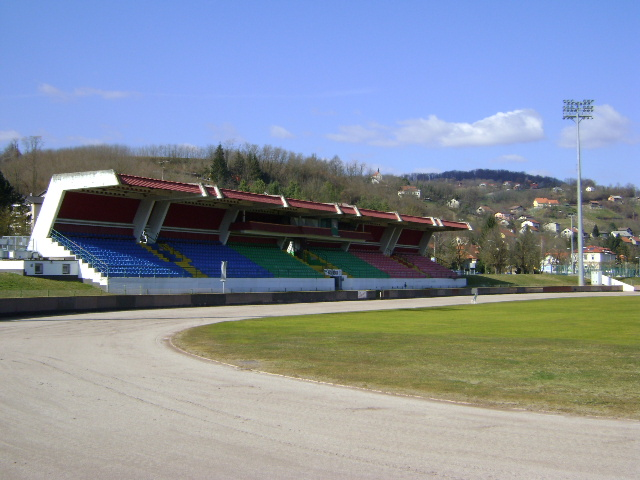
- The venue for the 1980 final

The 1980 Speedway World Pairs Championship was the eleventh FIM Speedway World Pairs Championship. The final took place at the Matija Gubec Stadium in Krško, Yugoslavia. The championship was won by England (29 points) who beat Poland (22 points) and Denmark (21 points).

== Preliminary round ==
- (Hungary) Borsod Volán Stadion, Miskolc
- 27 April

Pos.	Team	Rider	Points
1st	Hungary (23 pts)	?	?
1st	Hungary (23 pts)	?	?
2nd	Austria (23 pts)	?	?
2nd	Austria (23 pts)	?	?
3rd	Finland (22 pts)	?	?
3rd	Finland (22 pts)	?	?
4	Netherlands (21 pts)	?	?
4	Netherlands (21 pts)	?	?
5	Italy (19 pts)	?	?
5	Italy (19 pts)	?	?
6	Bulgaria (10 pts)	?	?
6	Bulgaria (10 pts)	?	?
7	Yugoslavia (8 pts)	?	?
7	Yugoslavia (8 pts)	?	?

== Semifinal 1 ==
- (West Germany) Olching Speedwaybahn, Olching
- 5 June

Placing	Pair / Rider Name	Total	1	2	3	4	5	6	7	8	9	10	11	12	13	14	15	16	17	18	19	20	21
1	New Zealand	25							8							18							25
1	(11) Ivan Mauger	17			3				3				3		3			3					2
1	(12) Larry Ross	8			0				2				2		2			2					E
2	Finland	23							6							16							23
2	(9) Ila Teromaa	12			1			3				2		2			1					3
2	(10) Kai Niemi	11			2			0				3		3			3					0
3	Sweden	21							5							14							21
3	(7) Jan Andersson	16		2				2			3					3				3			3
3	(8) Richard Hellsén	5		0				1			1					2				0			1
4	United States	20							7							12							20
4	(5) Bruce Penhall	12		3			2			3					E				2			2
4	(6) Scott Autrey	8		1			1			1					1				3			1
5	Czechoslovakia	16							8							11							16
5	(1) Jiri Stancl	11	2			2				2			1				2			2
5	(2) Petr Ondrasik	5	3			1				0			0				0			1
6	West Germany	13							4							7							13
6	(3) Georg Hack	10	1				3				2			0				1			3
6	(4) Christoph Betzl	3	0				0				E			1				0			2
7	Austria	8							4							6							8
7	(13) Herbert Szerecs	8				3			1			1				1			1		1
7	(14) Adi Funk	0				0			E			0				0			0		E
Placing	Pair / Rider Name	Total	1	2	3	4	5	6	7	8	9	10	11	12	13	14	15	16	17	18	19	20	21

m - exclusion for exceeding two minute time allowance • t - exclusion for touching the tapes • x - other exclusion • e - retired or mechanical failure • f - fell
ns - non-starter • nc - non-classify

gate A - inside	gate B	gate C	gate D - outside

== Semifinal 2 ==
- (Poland) Arena Częstochowa, Częstochowa
- 8 June

Placing	Pair / Rider Name	Total	1	2	3	4	5	6	7	8	9	10	11	12	13	14	15	16	17	18	19	20	21
1	Poland	25							8							18							25
1	(11) Edward Jancarz	10			1				3				2		2			2					0
1	(12) Zenon Plech	15			2				2				3		3			3					2
2	Denmark	22							9							15							22
2	(7) Ole Olsen	10		1				2			3					3				E			1
2	(8) Hans Nielsen	12		3				3			0					E				3			3
3	England	22							4							13							22
3	(9) Dave Jessup	12			E			E				3		3			3					3
3	(10) Peter Collins	10			3			1				2		1			2					1
4	Australia	20							7							13							20
4	(5) Billy Sanders	13		2			3			3					0				3			2
4	(6) John Titman	7		0			2			2					1				2			0
5	Norway	14							8							10							14
5	(1) Audun Ove Olsen	4	2			1				0			0				0			1
5	(2) Rolf Gramstad	10	3			2				1			1				1			2
6	Hungary	12							2							7							12
6	(3) Istvan Sziraczki	9	1				1				1			2				1			3
6	(4) Laszlo Meszaros	3	0				0				2			0				0			1
7	Netherlands	10							4							8							10
7	(13) Henny Kroeze	7				3			1			1				2			E		E
7	(14) Rudy Muts	3				0			E			0				1			E		2
Placing	Pair / Rider Name	Total	1	2	3	4	5	6	7	8	9	10	11	12	13	14	15	16	17	18	19	20	21

m - exclusion for exceeding two minute time allowance • t - exclusion for touching the tapes • x - other exclusion • e - retired or mechanical failure • f - fell
ns - non-starter • nc - non-classify

gate A - inside	gate B	gate C	gate D - outside

== World final ==
- (Socialist Federal Republic of Yugoslavia) Matija Gubec Stadium, Krško
- 22 June

Placing	Pair / Rider Name	Total	1	2	3	4	5	6	7	8	9	10	11	12	13	14	15	16	17	18	19	20	21
1	England	29							10							20							29
1	(13) Dave Jessup	15				2			3			2				2			3		3
1	(14) Peter Collins	14				3			2			3				3			2		1
2	Poland	22							6							15							22
2	(11) Edward Jancarz	15			3				1				2		3			3					3
2	(12) Zenon Plech	7			2				E				3		1			1					0
3	Denmark	21							8							14							21
3	(7) Ole Olsen	13		1				3			3					1				3			2
3	(8) Hans Nielsen	8		2				2			2					0				1			1
4	Sweden	18							8							14							18
4	(3) Jan Andersson	9	1				3				0			3				0			2
4	(4) Richard Hellsén	9	2				2				1			2				2			0
5	New Zealand	16							4							9							16
5	(1) Ivan Mauger	11	3			1				3			1				3			0
5	(2) Larry Ross	5	E			0				1			0				2			2
6	Finland	14							4							8							14
6	(5) Ila Teromaa	8		0			1			2					2				1			2
6	(6) Kai Niemi	6		3			0			0					0				0			3
7	Yugoslavia	6							2							4							6
7	(9) Vladislav Kočuvan	0			0			0				0		0			0					0
7	(10) Stefan Kekeč	6			1			1				1		1			1					1
Placing	Pair / Rider Name	Total	1	2	3	4	5	6	7	8	9	10	11	12	13	14	15	16	17	18	19	20	21

m - exclusion for exceeding two minute time allowance • t - exclusion for touching the tapes • x - other exclusion • e - retired or mechanical failure • f - fell
ns - non-starter • nc - non-classify

gate A - inside	gate B	gate C	gate D - outside

== See also ==
- 1980 Individual Speedway World Championship
- 1980 Speedway World Team Cup
- motorcycle speedway
- 1980 in sports
