= Matti Olin =

Former Finnish motorcycle speedway rider

- Born: 1948
- Nationality: Finnish

Career history

Great Britain
- 1974: Coventry Bees

Individual honours
- 1967, 1968, 1971 1972, 1973: Finnish champion

Matti Olin (born 1948) is a former international motorcycle speedway rider from Finland. He was the champion of Finland on five occasions and earned seven international caps for the Finland national speedway team.

== Biography ==
Olin, born in 1948, earned his reputation riding in Finland and won the Finnish Individual Speedway Championship on a five occasions in 1967, 1968, 1971, 1972 and 1973. Olin regularly qualified for the Speedway World Championship Nordic final round.

Olin only rode one season in the United Kingdom, riding for Coventry Bees during the 1974 British League season. He had been recommended to Coventry promoter Charles Ochiltree by Olle Nygren in April 1974. For a debut season in Britain, he averaged a respectable 5.69 over 21 meetings but returned home to Finland following a family bereavement and would never ride in British leagues again, choosing to look after his father's motor cycle business.
