= 2023 European Pairs Speedway Championship =

Motorcycle speedway event

The 2023 European Pairs Speedway Championship was the 20th edition of the European Pairs Speedway Championship. The final was held at the Marian Spychała Speedway Stadium in Opole, Poland on 1 October.

The first semi final was held at the Varkaus Speedway Stadion in Varkaus, Finland on 15 July, where defending champions Denmark were first on 21 points and qualified for the final along with Finland (20) and Great Britain (18). Sweden, Norway and a Finland/Latvia team were eliminated. The second semi final was held at the Nagyhalász Speedway Ring in Nagyhalász, Hungary on 2 September, which resulted in a win for Italy on 23 points followed by Slovenia and Latvia on 21 points.

In the final the home team Poland won the event for the ninth time.

== Final ==
- Marian Spychała Speedway Stadium, Opole, 1 October 2023

Position	team	Points	Riders
1	Poland (hosts)	26	Przemysław Pawlicki 14, Szymon Woźniak 12
2	Denmark	24	Rasmus Jensen 13, Mads Hansen 11
3	Finland	20	Timo Lahti 14, Antti Vuolas 6, Jesse Mustonen 0
4	Latvia	17	Andžejs Ļebedevs 11, Daniils Kolodinskis 3, Jevgeņijs Kostigovs 3
5	(United Kingdom) Great Britain	16	Adam Ellis 14, Tom Brennan 2
6	Slovenia	12	Matic Ivačič 8, Anže Grmek 4
7	Italy	11	Nicolas Covatti 7, Paco Castagna 4

== See also ==
- 2023 Speedway European Championship
