= Antti Vuolas =

Finnish speedway rider

- Born: 23 August 1999 (age 27); Finland
- Nationality: Finnish

Career history

Denmark
- 2022–2023: Region Varde

Great Britain
- 2024–2025: Workington
- 2024: Belle Vue
- 2025: Birmingham

Individual honours
- 2018, 2022: Finnish Championship bronze

Team honours
- 2023: European Pairs bronze
- 2024: British Premiership champion

Antti Vuolas (born 23 August 1999) is a motorcycle speedway rider from Finland.

== Career ==
Vuolas twice won the bronze medal at the Finnish Individual Speedway Championship in 2018 and 2022.

In 2022, Vuolas rode for Region Varde during the 2022 Danish speedway season and also appeared for Lublin in the U24 Ekstraliga. In 2023, he stayed with Region Varde for the 2023 Danish speedway season and was part of the Finland team that competed at the 2023 Speedway World Cup in Poland. In October 2023, he paired up with Timo Lahti to become the European Pairs bronze medal winner.

Vuolas made his British League debut with the Workington Comets in the 2024 Championship and helped Belle Vue Aces win the 2024 Premiership title. Vuolas also represented Finland during the 2024 Speedway of Nations.
