= 1987 Speedway World Pairs Championship =

18th edition of the World motorcycle speedway Pairs Championship

1987 World Pairs Championship

Seasons
- ← 1986 1988 →

The 1987 Speedway World Pairs Championship was the eighteenth FIM Speedway World Pairs Championship. The final took place in Pardubice, Czechoslovakia. The championship was won by host Denmark (52 points) who beat England (44 points) and United States (36 points).

== Semifinal 1 ==
- (Poland) KS Apator Stadium, Toruń
- 6 June

Pos.	Team	Rider	Points
1st	Denmark (54 pts)	11.Hans Nielsen (5,4,4,5,4,5)	27
1st	Denmark (54 pts)	12.Erik Gundersen (4,5,5,4,5,4)	27
2nd	New Zealand (44 pts)	15.Mitch Shirra (5,5,4,2,5,2)	23
2nd	New Zealand (44 pts)	16.David Bargh (3,3,5,3,4,3)	21
3rd	Poland (36 pts)	9.Wojciech Żabiałowicz (3,4,4,5,4,1)	21
3rd	Poland (36 pts)	10.Roman Jankowski (2,2,5,4,2,0)	15
4	Finland (35 pts)	13.Kai Niemi (4,4,3,2,3,4)	20
4	Finland (35 pts)	14.Olli Tyrväinen (2,5,1,0,5,2)	15
5	Sweden (30 pts)	5.Jimmy Nilsen (5,3,0,1,3,5)	17
5	Sweden (30 pts)	6.Per Jonsson (4,0,3,3,0,3)	13
6	Bulgaria (26 pts)	7.Angel Jeftimov (1,1,2,2,0,4)	10
6	Bulgaria (26 pts)	8.Nikolaj Manev (0,3,1,5,2,5)	16
7	Norway (20 pts)	3.Arne Svendsen (3,0,2,4,3,1)	13
7	Norway (20 pts)	4.Tor Einar Hielm (2,1,0,3,1,0)	7
8	France (16 pts)	17.Thierry Hilaire (1,2,2,1,1,3)	9
8	France (16 pts)	18.Patrice Blondy (0,1,3,0,0,2)	7
9	Yugoslavia (9 pts)	1.Czaba Lazar (1,0,1,1,2,1)	5
9	Yugoslavia (9 pts)	2.Artur Horvat (0,2,0,0,1,0)	4

== Semifinal 2 ==
- (West Germany) Motodrom Halbemond, Norden
- 6 June

Pos.	Team	Rider	Points
1st	United States (49 pts)	Shawn Moran	26
1st	United States (49 pts)	Kelly Moran	23
2nd	England (40 pts)	Kelvin Tatum	21
2nd	England (40 pts)	Simon Wigg	19
3rd	Italy (38 pts)	Valentino Furlanetto	23
3rd	Italy (38 pts)	Armando Castagna	15
4	Australia (36 pts)	Steve Regeling	18
4	Australia (36 pts)	Steve Baker	18
5	Hungary (25 pts)	Zoltan Adorjan	15
5	Hungary (25 pts)	Jozsef Petrikovics	10
6	West Germany (23 pts)	Karl Maier	19
6	West Germany (23 pts)	Gerd Riss	4
7	Austria (23 pts)	Toni Pilotto	17
7	Austria (23 pts)	Heinrich Schatzer	6
8	Netherlands (14 pts)	Robert-Jan Munnecom	10
8	Netherlands (14 pts)	Will Stroes	4
9	Belgium (14 pts)	Vital Cardeynaels	9
9	Belgium (14 pts)	Geert Cools	5

== World final ==
- (Czechoslovakia) Svítkov Stadion, Pardubice
- 28 June

Pos.	Team	Rider	Points
1st	Denmark (52 pts)	Erik Gundersen (4,4,5,4,4,5)	26
1st	Denmark (52 pts)	Hans Nielsen (3,5,4,5,5,4)	26
2nd	England (44 pts)	Kelvin Tatum (5,5,5,5,3,1)	24
2nd	England (44 pts)	Simon Wigg (1,4,4,4,5,2)	20
3rd	United States (36 pts)	Sam Ermolenko (3,0,5,2,5,3)	18
3rd	United States (36 pts)	Kelly Moran (4,3,4,3,4,e)	18
4	New Zealand (36 pts)	David Bargh (2,3,3,5,3,4)	20
4	New Zealand (36 pts)	Mitch Shirra (5,1,2,4,1,3)	16
5	Czechoslovakia (30 pts)	Roman Matoušek (2,1,3,2,3,5)	16
5	Czechoslovakia (30 pts)	Antonín Kasper Jr. (3,2,2,3,2,2)	14
6	Finland (19 pts)	Olli Tyrväinen (5,4,0,e,2,0)	11
6	Finland (19 pts)	Kai Niemi (1,e,1,1,4,1)	8
7	Australia (21 pts)	Steve Baker (4,2,0,3,2,5)	16
7	Australia (21 pts)	Steve Regeling (0,e,1,2,0,2)	5
8	Italy (18 pts)	Armando Castagna (2,5,2,1,1,0)	11
8	Italy (18 pts)	Valentino Furlanetto (0,3,3,0,0,1)	7
9	Poland (14 pts)	Wojciech Żabiałowicz (0,2,1,1,1,3)	8
9	Poland (14 pts)	Roman Jankowski (1,1,0,0,0,4)	6

== See also ==
- 1987 Individual Speedway World Championship
- 1987 Speedway World Team Cup
- motorcycle speedway
- 1987 in sports
