= Niklas Säyriö =

Finnish speedway rider

- Born: 3 October 1999 (age 27); Finland
- Nationality: Finnish

Niklas Säyriö (born 3 October 1999) is a motorcycle speedway rider from Finland.

== Career ==
Säyriö first came to prominence when reaching consecutive under 19 European finals, finishing 13th in the 2017 Individual Speedway Junior European Championship and then sixth in the 2018 Individual Speedway Junior European Championship.

In 2020, Säyriö reached the final of the 2020 Speedway Under-21 World Championship and finished in ninth place.

In 2022, Säyriö was selected in the Finland squad for the 2022 Speedway of Nations and the following season in 2023, he was part of the Finland team that competed at the 2023 Speedway World Cup in Poland.
