= Pepe Teromaa =

Finnish speedway rider

- Born: 6 April 1956 (age 70); Tampere, Finland
- Nationality: Finnish

Career history
- 1975: Coventry Bees
- 1976–1977: Leicester Lions

Veli-Pekka Teromaa also known as Pepe Teromaa (born 6 April 1956) is a Finnish former motorcycle speedway rider who rode in the British League for Leicester Lions and Coventry Bees in the 1970s. He earned three caps for the Finland national speedway team.

== Career ==
The younger brother of former Finnish Champion Ila Teromaa, Pepe established himself in speedway racing in Finland, and finished fourth in the Finnish Championship in 1974.

In 1975, Teromaa signed for Coventry Bees but his season was cut short by injury in his first match. In 1976, he joined his brother at Leicester Lions where he spent two seasons.
