= Varkaus Speedway Stadion =

Motorcycle speedway stadium in Varkaus, Finland

- Interactive map of Varkaus Speedway Stadion
- Location: Tykkitie 158, 78210 Varkaus, Finland
- Coordinates: 62°20′36″N 27°49′27″E

Varkaus Speedway Stadion is a motorcycle speedway in Varkaus, Finland. It is located on the northern outskirts of the town off the Tykkitie road, adjacent to the motorcycle racing and karting facilities.

== History ==
The Speedway circuit is one of the oldest in Finland and held the final of the Finnish Individual Speedway Championship three times in 1985, 1995 and 2002.

In recent years the track has been renovated to meet international regulations and was chosen as the venue for the 2018 Individual Speedway Junior European Championship final and the semi-final of the 2023 European Pairs Speedway Championship.

In 2024, the track was selected to hold the semi-final of the European Under-19 Individual Speedway Championship.
