= Antti Pajari =

Finnish speedway rider

- Born: 27 August 1932; Sippola, Finland
- Nationality: Finnish

Career history

Great Britain
- 1959: Coventry Bees

Individual honours
- 1956, 1957, 1958: Finnish champion
- 1959: European longtrack silver

Antti Pajari (born 27 August 1932) is a former motorcycle speedway rider from Finland. He earned 14 caps for the Finland national speedway team.

== Career ==
Pajari came to prominence after winning the Finnish national title at the Finnish Individual Speedway Championship in 1956. He then won two more to complete three consecutive championships from 1956 to 1958.

The success drew the attention of the British speedway leagues, and Coventry Bees signed Pajari for the 1959 Speedway National League.

Pajari won the silver medal in the 1959 Individual Long Track European Championship.

Pajari's career at Coventry ended in September 1959, when he broke his wrist riding in Denmark and he returned to his native Finland.
