= 2022 Speedway of Nations =

World Championship motorcycle speedway event

The 2022 Speedway of Nations was the fifth FIM Speedway of Nations. The competition consisted of two semi-finals and a final. Great Britain were the defending champions having won the 2021 competition.

Both the semi-finals and final were held at Vojens Speedway Center in Denmark, after the initial host Esbjerg was unable to fulfill the contract. Denmark were automatically seeded into the final as hosts.

The first semi-final was won by Australia, with Finland securing the second automatic qualifying spot. Poland won a run-off with Germany to secure the last spot. The second semi-final was won by Sweden, ahead of Czech Republic. Great Britain beat France in a run-off to complete the final line-up.

Australia won the competition after beating Great Britain in the final. Great Britain had top scored during the regular heats, but Jack Holder and Max Fricke beat Dan Bewley and Robert Lambert in the Grand Final to take the title for the first time. Sweden claimed the bronze medal.

== First semi-final ==
- Vojens Speedway Center, Vojens, Denmark
- 27 July

Pos	Nation	Riders	Pts
1	Australia	Max Fricke 15, Jack Holder 14, Jason Doyle 6	35
2	Finland	Timo Lahti 18, Timi Salonen 16	34
3	Poland	Bartosz Zmarzlik 15, Patryk Dudek 10, Maciej Janowski 6	31
4	Germany	Kai Huckenbeck 18, Norick Blödorn 12	30
5	United States	Luke Becker 19, Broc Nicol 6, Dillon Ruml 0	25
6	Ukraine	Marko Levishyn 18, Stanislav Melnychuk 0, Vitalli Lysak 0	18
7	Latvia	Jevgeņijs Kostigovs 7, Oļegs Mihailovs 7, Francis Gusts 2	16

=== Final Qualifier ===
1st	2nd
Poland - 7 Bartosz Zmarzlik - 4 Patryk Dudek - 3	Germany - 2 Kai Huckenbeck - 2 Norick Blödorn - 0

== Second semi-final ==
- Vojens Speedway Center, Vojens, Denmark
- 28 July

Pos	Nation	Riders	Pts
1	Sweden	Oliver Berntzon 21, Fredrik Lindgren 14	35
2	Czech Republic	Václav Milík 19, Jan Kvěch 15	34
3	France	Dimitri Bergé 19, David Bellego 13	32
4	Great Britain	Tai Woffinden 19, Dan Bewley 6, Robert Lambert 6	31
5	Slovenia	Matic Ivačič 17, Nick Škorja 3, Anže Grmek 2	22
6	Norway	Espen Sola 11, Lasse Fredriksen 7, Glenn Moi 0	18
7	Italy	Michele Paco Castagna 17, Daniele Tessari 0	17

Slovakia replaced by Norway after Slovakia withdrew following an injury to their leading rider Martin Vaculík.

=== Final Qualifier ===
1st	2nd
Great Britain - 7 Dan Bewley - 4 Tai Woffinden - 3	France - 2 Dimitri Bergé - 2 David Bellego - 0

== Final ==
- Vojens Speedway Center, Vojens, Denmark
- 30 July

Pos	Nation	Riders	Pts
1	Great Britain	Robert Lambert 18, Dan Bewley 14	32
2	Sweden	Oliver Berntzon 20, Fredrik Lindgren 10	30
3	Australia	Jack Holder 19, Max Fricke 11	30
4	Denmark	Leon Madsen 15, Mikkel Michelsen 13	28
5	Czech Republic	Václav Milík 18, Jan Kvěch 9	27
6	Poland	Bartosz Zmarzlik 20, Maciej Janowski 4, Patryk Dudek 2	26
7	Finland	Timo Lahti 14, Jesse Mustonen 2, Timi Salonen 0	16

=== Grand Final Qualifier ===
1st	2nd
Australia - 6 Jack Holder - 4 Max Fricke - 2	Sweden - 3 Fredrik Lindgren - 3 Oliver Berntzon - EX

=== Grand Final ===
1st	2nd
Australia - 7 Jack Holder - 4 Max Fricke - 3	Great Britain - 2 Dan Bewley - 2 Robert Lambert - 0
