= Marian Spychała Speedway Stadium =

Stadium in Opole, Poland

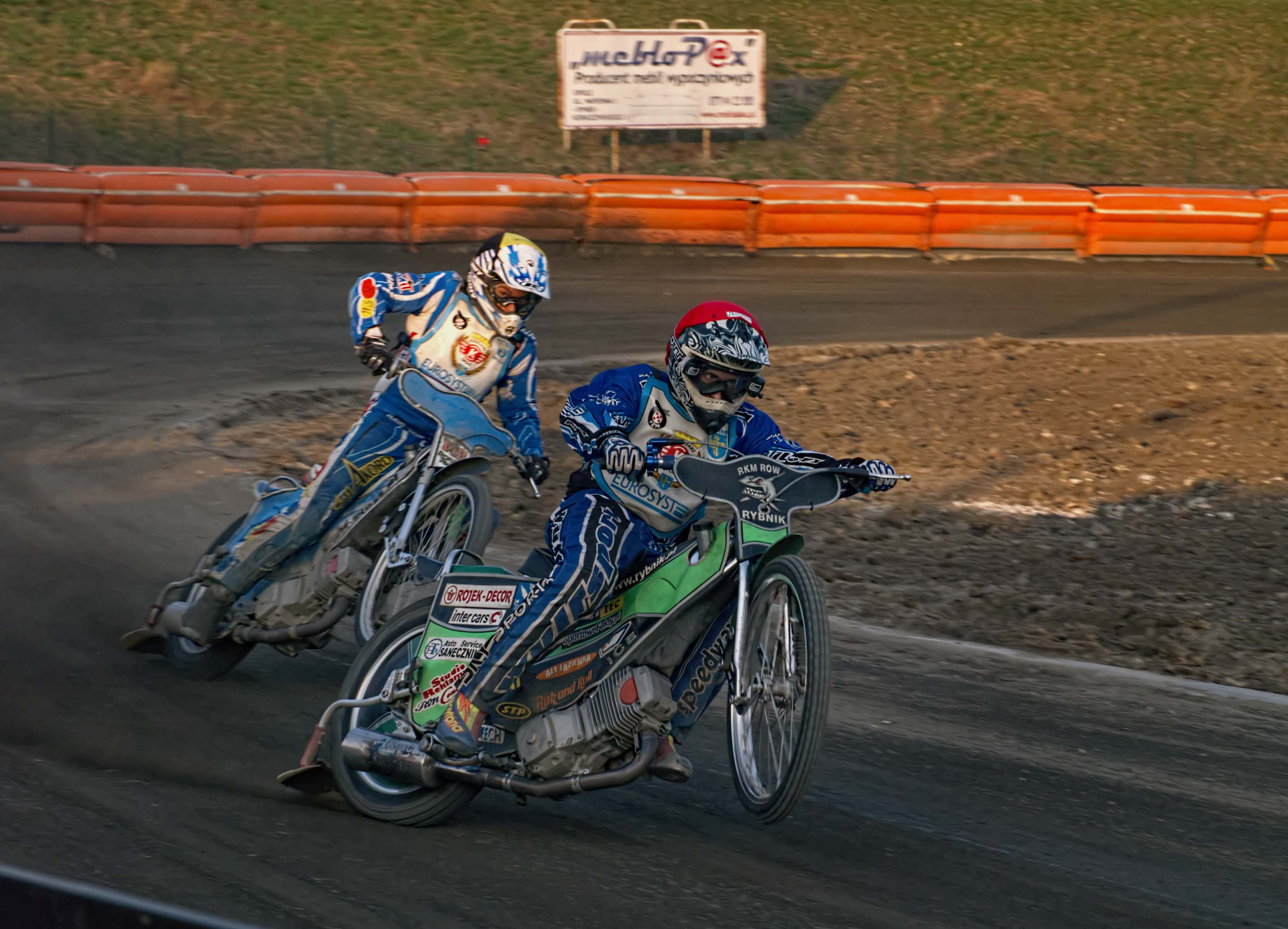
- Riders on the Opole track in 2010
- Location: Wschodnia 2, 45-233 Opole, Poland
- Coordinates: 50°39′35″N 17°57′36″E
- Capacity: 8,000
- Opened: Pre World War II
- Length: 0.321 km (0.199 mi)

The Marian Spychała Speedway Stadium (Polish: Stadion im. Mariana Spychały w Opolu) formerly the Stadion Kolejarz, is an 8,000-capacity motorcycle speedway stadium in Opole, Poland.

The venue is used by the speedway team Kolejarz Opole, who compete in the Team Speedway Polish Championship.

== History ==
The stadium was built before World War II and featured an athletics track. During the war the stadium (which could hold 2,600 spectators of which 600 were seated) was destroyed. The stadium was rebuilt as a speedway stadium in 1957.

It underwent an expansion in 1960 with 5,000 seats and 3,000 standing areas, before becoming the home of Kolejarz Opole in 1961. Since 1988 the speedway track has measured 321 metres.

On 2 July 2015, the stadium was renamed after a former rider, Marian Spychała, who was a prominent team manager for Kolejarz Opole.

On 18 April 2022, the stadium hosted the Golden Helmet, which was won by the world champion Bartosz Zmarzlik. He broke the track record during the event, recording a time of 59.39 seconds.

The 2023 European Pairs Speedway Championship was hosted at the track, as was the Golden Helmet again in 2023 and 2024.
