= Southern Park, Tampere =

Park in Tampere, Finland

Coordinates: 61°29′26″N 023°45′15″E

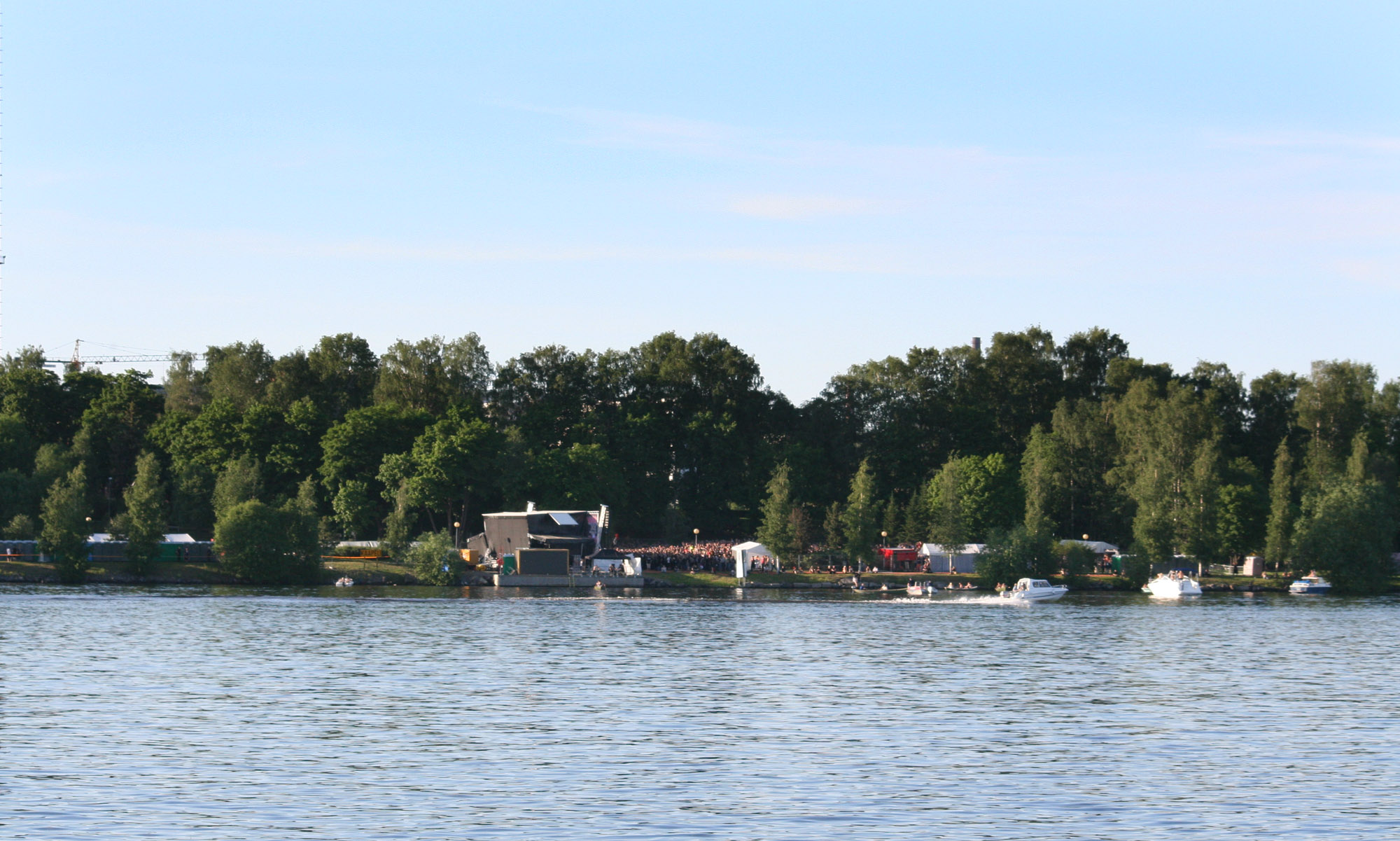
Southern Park seen from the Hatanpää Arboretum during Sauna Open Air Metal Festival

Southern Park (Finnish: Eteläpuisto) is a public park in Tampere, Finland. It was designed by the engineer K. Vaaramäki and built by landscape gardener Onni Karsten. It is a common venue for musical concerts during the summer.

== History ==
At the end of the 19th century, Eteläpuisto had vegetable gardens and cellars for Russian soldiers, and during the civil war in 1918, potatoes and fennel were temporarily grown there. The park was built in two phases in 1915–1917 and 1928–1929. The park was designed by city engineer K. Vaaramäki and its construction was led by city gardener Onni Karsten. In 1924, a classical-style round stage was built there. It was replaced in 1950 by the Co-operative Memorial designed by Wäinö Aaltonen, a double-sided work "Back from Shopping" and on the other side of the work is "Log Carriers". At the time, it was the largest sculpture in the Nordic countries. In 1953, a bust of the industrialist Fabian Klingendahl made by Yrjö Liipola was erected in the park.

From 31 July 1953 to 11 September 1988, Eteläpuisto's beach embankment served as a motorcycle speedway track. It was an important venue for speedway competitions and was first used for international competition in 1974 as the host of the Nordic Final as part of the qualifying for the Speedway World Championship. The Nordic Final was also held in Tampere in 1977 and 1989. It also hosted the Scandinavian round as part of the 1976 Speedway World Team Cup, 1979 Speedway World Team Cup, 1981 Speedway World Team Cup and 1984 Speedway World Team Cup. In addition, it hosted the final of the Finnish Individual Speedway Championship on multiple occasions from 1959 to 1984.

In 2004, the Sauna Open Air festival, was held there for the first time in 2004.

== Gallery ==
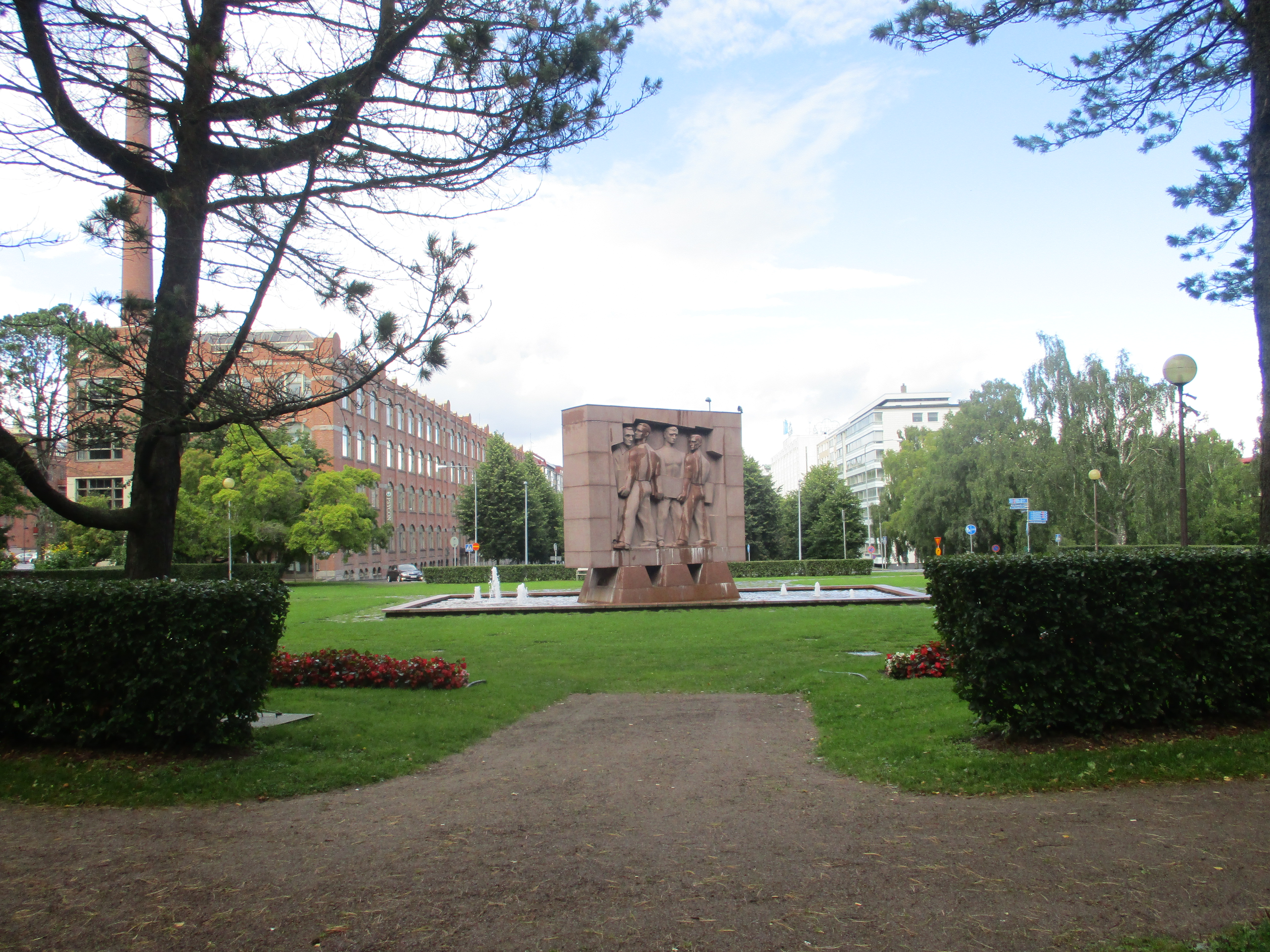
Sculpture by Wäinö Aaltonen
