= 1959 Individual Long Track European Championship =

Motorcycle racing competition

1959 Long Track European Championship

The 1959 Individual Long Track European Championship was the third edition of the Long Track European Championship. The final was held on 20 August 1959 in Helsinki, Finland.

The title was won by Josef Hofmeister of West Germany for the second time.

== Venues ==
- 1st semi-final - Stockholm, 7 May 1959
- 2nd semi-final - Scheeßel, 7 June 1959
- Semi Final - Dingolfing on 28 June 1959
- Final - Helsinki, 20 August 1959

== Final Classification ==
Pos	Rider	Pts
1	(West Germany) Josef Hofmeister	19
2	(Finland) Antti Pajari	18
3	(Sweden) Olle Nygren	18
4	(Finland) Kauko Jousanen	24
5	(West Germany) Josef Seidl	24
6	(Sweden) Rune Sörmander	19
7	(Norway) Erling Simonsen	14
8	(West Germany) Fred Aberl	6
9	(Finland) Aulis Tuominen	14
10	(Finland) Leo Frantila	12
11	(Finland) Olavi Turunen	10
12	(Finland) Kaveli Lahtinen	9
13	(Finland) Heikki Sorri	8
14	(Sweden) Valter Persson	7
15	(Austria) Josef Chalupa	3
16	(West Germany) Manfred Poschenreider	3
17	(Finland) Esko Koponen	7
18	(West Germany) Walter Gernert	3
