= Mika Pellinen =

Former Finnish motorcycle speedway rider

- Born: 23 March 1968 (age 58)
- Nationality: Finnish

Career history

Great Britain
- 1994: Swindon Robins
- 1994: Exeter Falcons

Sweden
- 1993: Dackarna

Individual honours
- 1993: Finnish champion

Mika Pellinen (born 23 March 1968) is a Finnish former international motorcycle speedway rider. He was the champion of Finland in 1993 and earned four international caps for the Finland national speedway team.

== Biography ==
Pellinen, born in 1968, earned his reputation riding in Finland and won the Finnish Individual Speedway Championship in 1993. Pellinen regularly qualified for the Speedway World Championship Nordic final round. He was associated with the Hyvinkää speedway track.

Pellinen only rode one season in the United Kingdom, riding for Swindon Robins (as a temporary replacement) before moving to Exeter Falcons during the 1994 British League Division Two season. His rides were restricted to just three meetings for Swindon and six meetings for Exeter during his debut season in Britain and he averaged 6.24 and 5.43 respectively.

Pellinen's career at Exeter finished abruptly because he broke his leg during the season, ending his British leagues career.
