= Ila Teromaa =

Finnish motorcycle speedway rider

- Born: 3 September 1953; Tampere, Finland
- Died: 21 June 2017 (aged 63)
- Nationality: Finnish

Career history
- 1972–1974: Tampere
- 1975–1979: Leicester Lions
- 1979–1980: Cradley Heathens

Individual honours
- 1975, 1976: Finland National Champion

Team honours
- 1980: British League KO Cup Winner
- 1980: Midland Cup

Ilkka "Ila" Teromaa (3 September 1953 – 21 June 2017) was a Finnish speedway rider who rode in the British League. He earned eight caps for the Finland national speedway team.

== Career ==
After riding for three years for the Tampere Aces, Teromaa joined Leicester Lions in 1975, becoming a heat leader by the end of the year and winning the 1975 Finnish individual championship. In 1976, he was the top scorer for the Lions. His season was interrupted by injury in 1977 but he continued to score well in 1978. He stayed until 1979 when he was transferred to the Heathens during the season after his form had dropped, averaging below six points. A disappointing 1980 season for the Heathens saw his average drop below five points. Teromaa rode in the 1978 World Final, finishing in eleventh place after scoring six points.

Teromaa signed for Cradley towards the end of the 1979 season and in 1980, he won the British League Knockout Cup and Midland Cup with Cradley Heathens.

During the last two years of his speedway career, Teromaa lost interest in the sport and decided that it was soon time to retire, settle down and start a family. Teromaa rode his last speedway season (1981) for the German club Brockstedt. He and his wife moved back to Finland in November 1981, two weeks before their first child was born.

Teromaa's younger brother Pepe was also a speedway rider, and the two rode together in the Leicester Lions team in 1976 and 1977.

Teromaa died on 21 June 2017 due to complications from surgery.

== World Final appearances ==
=== Individual World Championship ===
- 1978 – (England) London, Wembley Stadium - 11th - 6pts

=== World Pairs Championship ===
- 1977 – (England) Manchester, Hyde Road (with Kai Niemi) - 6th - 14pts (7)
- 1979 – (Denmark) Vojens, Vojens Speedway Center (with Kai Niemi) - 7th - 7pts (0)
- 1980 – (Socialist Federal Republic of Yugoslavia) Krško, Matija Gubec Stadium (with Kai Niemi) - 6th - 14pts (8)
