= Jari Mäkinen =

Finnish motorcycle speedway rider (born 1990)

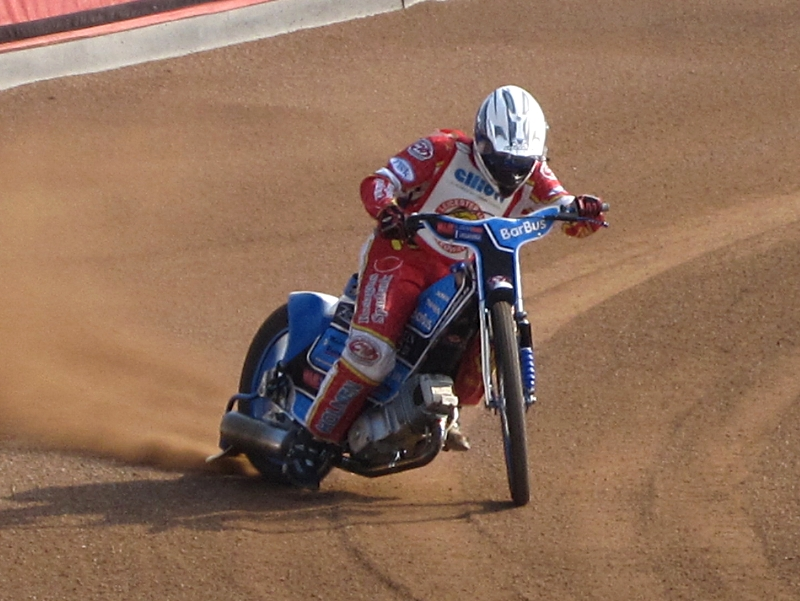
- Born: 13 June 1990 (age 36); Hämeenkyrö, Finland
- Nationality: Finnish

Career history

Great Britain
- 2008: Mildenhall Fen Tigers
- 2009: Somerset Rebels
- 2012: Leicester Lions
- 2013: Ipswich Witches

Sweden
- 2015: Vargarna

Individual honours
- 2014: Finnish National Champion
- 2007: Finnish Under-21 Champion

Jari Aulis Mäkinen (born 13 June 1990) is a former motorcycle speedway rider from Finland. He earned one cap for the Finland national speedway team.

== Career ==
Born in Hämeenkyrö, Mäkinen took up speedway at the age of eight. He has ridden for several teams in Sweden (including current team Rospiggarna), Poland, and Denmark. In the UK for Mildenhall Fen Tigers in 2008 and the Premier League for Somerset Rebels in 2009. In November 2011, he signed with Leicester Lions for the 2012 Premier League season. He joined Ipswich Witches in 2013 but was dropped early in the season.

Mäkinen won the Finnish Under-21 Championship in 2007.

In 2014, Mäkinen decided to sit out the UK season and concentrate on his racing commitments in Sweden and his native Finland which proved to be the right decision as his reduced schedule helped him become the national champion of Finland after winning the Finnish Individual Speedway Championship in 2014.

In 2015, Mäkinen again rode only in Sweden and Finland while trying to secure a reserve berth in the F.I.M Finnish Grand Prix as well as defending his national title.
