= Kalle Katajisto =

Finnish speedway rider

- Born: 24 April 1991 (age 35)
- Nationality: Finnish

Career history

Great Britain
- 2011–2014: Edinburgh Monarchs
- 2013-2014: Plymouth Devils

Kalle Katajisto (born 24 April 1991) is a Finnish former motorcycle speedway rider. He earned 3 caps for the Finland national speedway team.

== Career ==
Katajisto was a member of the Finnish national team. He rode in the British leagues when he signed for Edinburgh Monarchs in 2007. He stayed with the Scottish club for four seasons leaving after the 2014 season. However, he was to return to Britain in 2013 and 2014 riding for the Plymouth Devils.

In 2009, Katajisto won the bronze medal at the Finnish Individual Speedway Championship.

== Results ==
=== World Championships ===
- Team World Championships (Speedway World Team Cup and Speedway World Cup)
  - 2009 - 3rd place in the Qualifying round Two
- Individual U-21 World Championship
  - 2008 - 12th place in the qualifying round Four
  - 2009 - 12th place in the qualifying round Five
- Team U-21 World Championship (Under-21 World Cup)
  - 2009 - 4th place in the qualifying round Two
  - 2010 - 4th place in the qualifying round One

=== European Championships ===
- Individual U-19 European Championship
  - 2008 - 15th place in the semi-final 2
  - 2009 - (Poland) Tarnów - 12th place (5 pts)
- Team U-19 European Championship
  - 2009 - 2nd place in the semi-final

=== Domestic competitions ===
- Individual Finnish Junior Championship
  - 2008 - Runner-up
- British Premier League
  - 2007 - 13th place for Edinburgh Monarchs

== See also ==
- Finland national speedway team (U-21, U-19)
