= Timo Lahti =

Finnish speedway rider

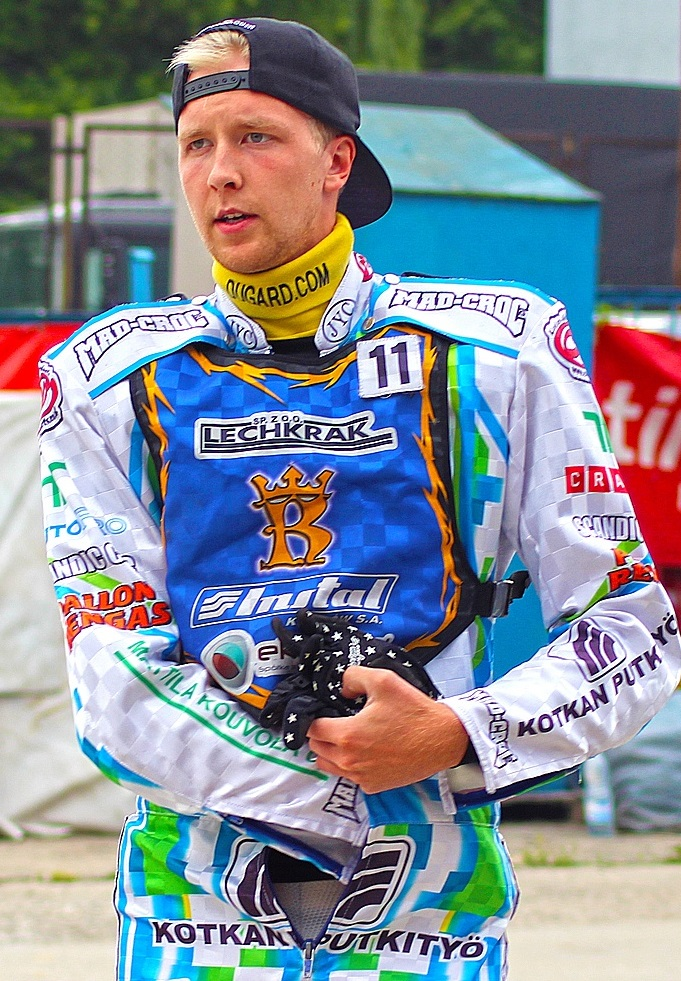
- Born: 16 July 1992 (age 34); Kouvola, Finland
- Nationality: Finnish, Swedish

Career history

Great Britain
- 2011-2014: Eastbourne
- 2017: Poole

Poland
- 2022: Gdańsk
- 2024–2025: Tarnów

Sweden
- 2014-2017, 2020–2023: Rospiggarna
- 2018-2019: Lejonen
- 2023: Smederna
- 2024–2025: Dackarna
- 2024: Masarna

Denmark
- 2012: Holstebro
- 2014, 2016, 2024–2025: Holsted
- 2015: Munkebo
- 2021: Nordjysk
- 2022–2023: Region Varde

Germany
- 2019: Brokstedt

Individual honours
- 2012, 2015, 2016 2017, 2018, 2019 2021: Finnish national champion
- 2023: Golden Helmet of Pardubice

Team honours
- 2023: European Pairs bronze

Timo Lahti (born 16 July 1992) is a speedway rider from Finland. Timo Lahti changed nation in 2024 when he started riding under a Swedish Licence He earned 3 caps for the Finland national speedway team.

== Career ==
Lahti started his British career riding for the Eastbourne Eagles in 2011. He became the national champion of Finland after winning the Finnish Individual Speedway Championship in 2012. After a total of four seasons at Eastbourne, he left after the 2014 season.

Lahti won a further five national championships from 2015 to 2019 consecutively before being deposed by Tero Aarnio. Before the 2017 win he had returned to British speedway by riding in the top tier for the Poole Pirates in the SGB Premiership 2017.

In 2021, Lahti regained his Finnish title which brought his total number of national titles to seven. In 2023, he was part of the Finland team that competed at the 2023 Speedway World Cup in Poland. In July 2023, he transferred to Smederna from Rospiggarna and later in October 2023, he paired up with Antti Vuolas to become the European Pairs bronze medal winner.

Lahti won the prestigious 2023 Golden Helmet of Pardubice.
