= Ari Koponen (speedway rider) =

Finnish speedway rider (1959–2018)

- Born: 20 July 1959; Lahti, Finland
- Died: 28 April 2018 (aged 58)
- Nationality: Finnish

Career history

Great Britain
- 1978–1982: Birmingham Brummies
- 1983: Wimbledon Dons
- 1984–1985: Swindon Robins

Sweden
- 1987: Getingarna
- 1988–1989: Rospiggarna

Individual honours
- 1983, 1985, 1987: Finnish national Champion
- 1979: World U21 Championship bronze

Team honours
- 1988: Sweden Division 1

Ari Koponen (20 July 1959 – 28 April 2018) was a Finnish motorcycle speedway rider. He earned 17 caps for the Finland national speedway team.

== Career ==
In 1978, Koponen joined the Birmingham Brummies for the 1978 British League season, this was his first season in the British leagues. The following year, he won a bronze medal at the 1979 Individual Speedway Junior European Championship.

Koponen remained with Birmingham for five years, scoring over 800 points until he requested a transfer and joined Wimbledon Dons in 1983. It was in 1983, that Koponen became the national champion of Finland after winning the Finnish Individual Speedway Championship.

In 1984, Koponen switched from Wimbledon to join the Swindon Robins where he enjoyed two successful seasons in 1984 and 1985. Also in 1985, he won a second Finnish national championship. In 1987, he won his third and final Finnish national championship.

Koponen was also a long track rider and reached the Individual Speedway Long Track World Championship final in 1988.

== See also ==
- Finland national speedway team
