= Varkaus =

- Town
- Varkauden kaupunki Varkaus stad
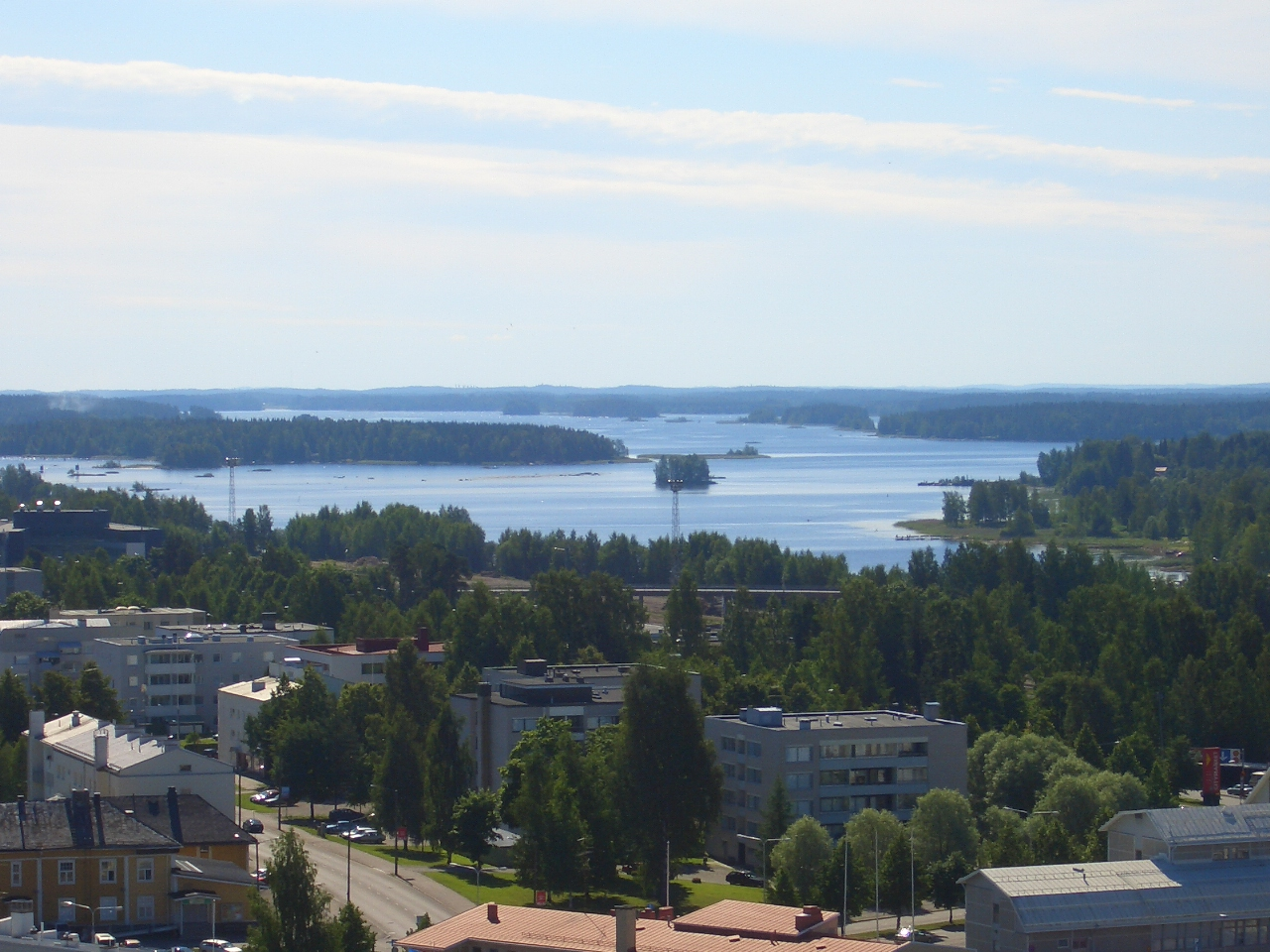
- Varkaus in July 2006

- Coat of arms

- Location of Varkaus in Finland
- Interactive map of Varkaus
- Coordinates: 62°19′N 027°53.5′E
- Country: Finland
- Region: North Savo
- Sub-region: Varkaus
- Market town: 1929
- City rights: 1961

Government
  - Town manager: Hannu Tsupari

Area (2018-01-01)
  - Total: 524.48 km^{2} (202.50 sq mi)
  - Land: 385.62 km^{2} (148.89 sq mi)
  - Water: 138.45 km^{2} (53.46 sq mi)
  - Rank: 206th largest in Finland

Population (2025-12-31)
  - Total: 19,433
  - Rank: 58th largest in Finland
  - Density: 50.39/km^{2} (130.5/sq mi)

Population by native language
  - Finnish: 93.2% (official)
  - Swedish: 0.2%
  - Others: 6.7%

Population by age
  - 0 to 14: 12%
  - 15 to 64: 56.4%
  - 65 or older: 31.6%
- Time zone: UTC+02:00 (EET)
  - Summer (DST): UTC+03:00 (EEST)
- Website: varkaus.fi

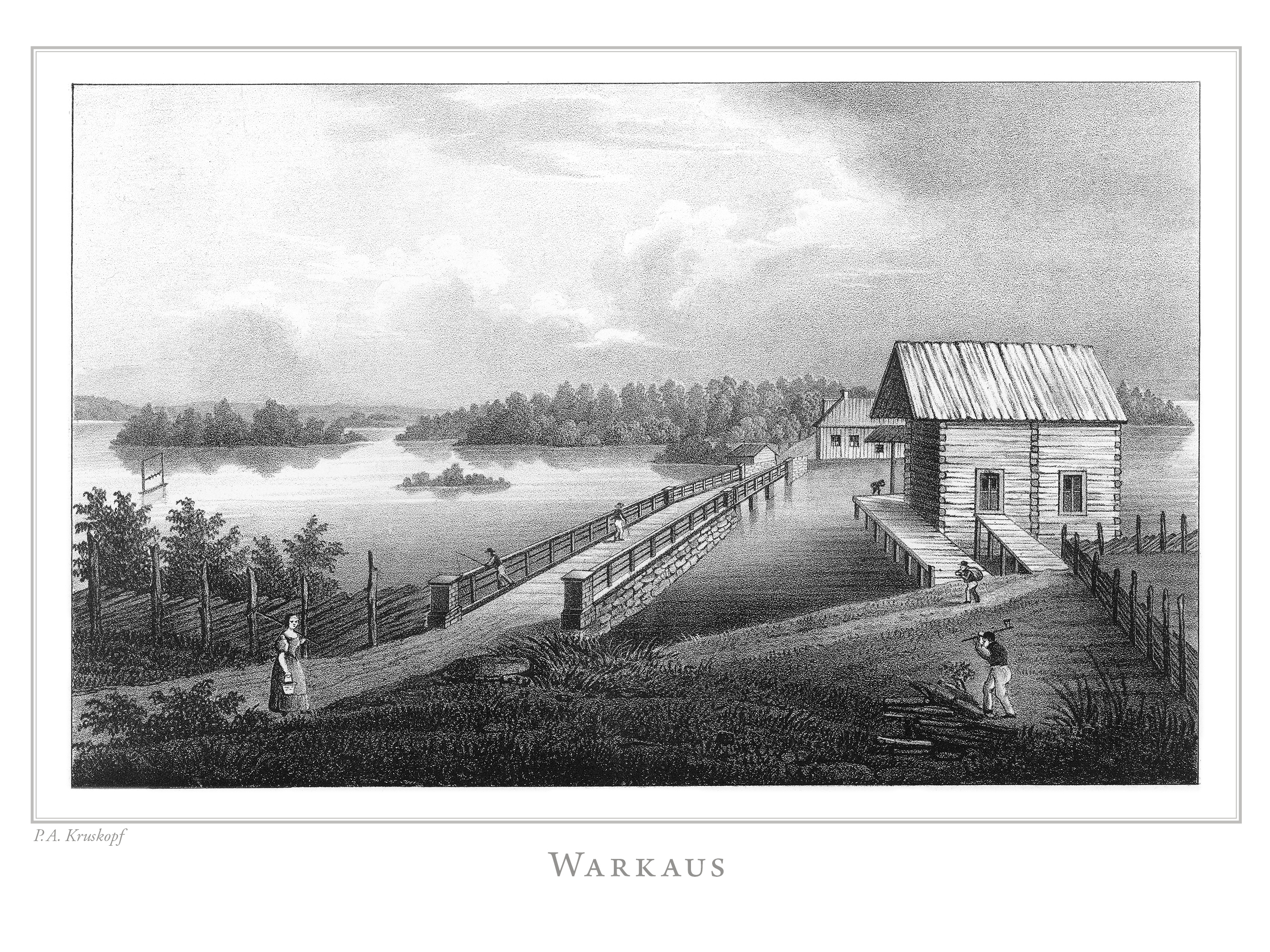
Illustration in Finland framstäldt i teckningar edited by Zacharias Topelius and published 1845-1852.

Varkaus, before 1929 known as Warkaus, is a Middle-Savonian industrial town and municipality of Finland. It is located in the former province of Eastern Finland and is part of the North Savo region, between the city of Kuopio and the town of Savonlinna.

The municipality has a population of 19,433 (31 December 2025) and covers an area of 524.48 square kilometres (202.50 sq mi) of which 138.45 km^{2} (53.46 sq mi) is water. The population density is 50.39 inhabitants per square kilometre (130.5/sq mi).

The municipality is unilingually Finnish. In old Finnish 'Varkaus' meant strait, and this city is located in the lake district on straits between two parts of Lake Saimaa. An extension of the Saimaa Canal passes through the town.

== History ==
Varkaus was born in the late 19th century as an industrial community of the A. Ahlström paper mills. It was a part of the municipalities of Leppävirta and Joroinen until 1929 when Varkaus became a market town. During the Finnish Civil War in 1918 the town was taken over by the Reds, but because of its isolated location in rural Finland, it was soon taken by the Whites on the Battle of Varkaus 19–21 February. The whites proceeded to execute every tenth Red soldier.

The municipality of Kangaslampi was consolidated to Varkaus on 1 January 2005.

== Sport ==
The bandy team Warkauden Pallo-35, or just WP-35, plays in the highest division, Bandyliiga, and has become Finnish champions 16 times.

Varkaus Speedway Stadion is a motorcycle speedway on the northern outskirts of the town off the Tykkitie road, adjacent to the motorcycle racing and karting facilities. The Speedway circuit is one of the oldest in Finland and held the final of the Finnish Individual Speedway Championship three times.

== Notable people ==
- Onni Hiltunen (1895–1971), politician
- Jukka Keskisalo (born 1981), steeplechaser
- Antti Kupiainen (born 1954), mathematical physicist
- Esa Pakarinen (1911–1989), actor and musician
- Esa Pakarinen Junior (1947—2026), actor
- Piia Pantsu (born 1971), equestrian rider
- Lassi Parkkinen (1917–1994), speed skater
- Erkki Pulliainen (born 1938), biologist and politician
- Pekka Siitoin (1944–2003), occultist and neo-Nazi
- Petri Varis (born 1969), ice hockey forward

== Parts of the town of Varkaus ==
- Kaura-aho
- Käpykangas
- Kuoppakangas
- Kosulanniemi
- Lehtoniemi
- Puurtila
- Taipale
- Luttila
- Könönpelto
- Kangaslampi
- Kurola
- Hasinmäki
- Häyrilä
- Päiviönsaari
- Peltola

== Twin towns — sister cities ==
Varkaus is twinned with:

- Lu'an, China
- Nakskov, Denmark
- Rjukan, Norway
- Sandviken, Sweden
- Petrozavodsk, Russia
- Rüsselsheim, Germany
- Pirna, Germany
- Zalaegerszeg, Hungary

== See also ==
- Soisalo
- The industrial heritage of Varkaus - European Heritage site (2025)
