= Timi Salonen =

Finnish speedway rider

- Born: 2 August 2001 (age 25); Finland
- Nationality: Finnish

Career history

Sweden
- 2019: Vargarna

Poland
- 2022: Rzeszów

Denmark
- 2021–2023: Slangerup

Timi Salonen (born 2 August 2001) is a speedway rider from Finland.

== Speedway career ==
Salonen represented Finland at senior level in the 2022 Speedway of Nations final, after securing a second-place finish in the semi-final. Also in 2022, he finished 12th in the final standings of the 2022 SGP2.

In 2022, Salonen was riding for Slangerup in Denmark and Rzeszów in Poland.

In 2023, Salonen was a qualified substitute for the World Championship for the 2023 Speedway Grand Prix.
