= Juha Hautamäki =

Finnish speedway rider

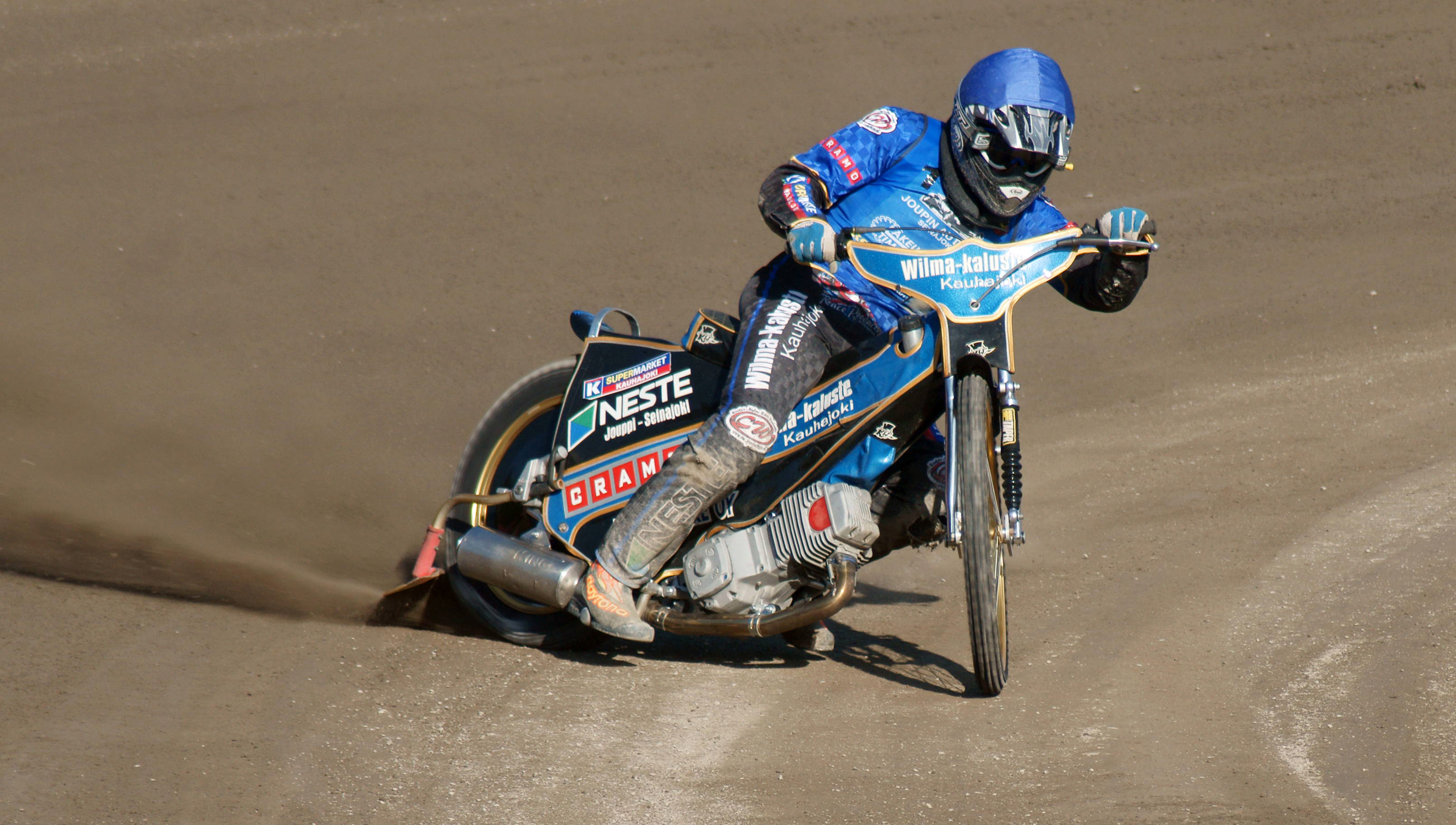
- Hautamäki riding in 2010
- Born: 8 June 1982 (age 44)
- Nationality: Finnish

Career history
- 2002: Vikingarna
- 2003: Team Bikab

Individual honours
- 2005, 2007, 2008, 2013: Finnish national Champion
- 2003: Junior Finnish Champion

Team honours
- 2002: Division One (East) Winner

Juha Hautamäki (born 8 June 1982) is a Finnish former motorcycle speedway rider, who is a four-time champion of Finland.

== Career ==
Hautamäki is a four times national champion of Finland after winning the Finnish Individual Speedway Championship in 2005, 2007, 2008 and 2013.

Hautamäki was a member of Finland team at Speedway World Cups and helped Finland win the 2010 Speedway World Cup Qualification round one to reach the semi-finals.

Hautamäki won the meeting when the Yteri speedway returned in 2016.

== Results ==
=== World Championships ===
- Team World Championship (Speedway World Team Cup and Speedway World Cup)
  - 2003 – 7th place
  - 2004 – 3rd place in Qualifying round 1
  - 2006 – 7th place
  - 2007 – 8th place
  - 2008 – 2nd place in Qualifying round 2
  - 2009 – 3rd place in Qualifying round 2

=== European Championships ===
- Individual European Championship
  - 2008 – 11th place in Semi-Final 1
- European Pairs Championship
  - 2007 – (Italy) Terenzano – 4th place (1 pt)

=== Domestic competitions ===
- Finnish Team Championship
  - 2008 Kotkat, Seinäjoki
  - 2009 Kotkat, Seinäjoki
  - 2013 Kotkat, Seinäjoki
  - 2016 Porin Nopea Racing, Pori
- Individual Finnish Championship
  - 1998 – 14th place (2 pts)
  - 1999 – 13th place (4 pts)
  - 2000 – 11th place (6+1 pts)
  - 2001 – 11th place (6+1 pts)
  - 2002 – 4th place (13 pts)
  - 2003 – 6th place (10 pts)
  - 2004 – Runner-up (17 pts)
  - 2005 – Finnish Champion (65 pts)
  - 2006 – Runner-up (20 pts)
  - 2007 – Finnish Champion (25 pts)
  - 2008 – Finnish Champion (12+3 pts)
- Individual Junior Finnish Championship
  - 1998 – 4th place (12 pts)
  - 1999 – Runner-up (17 pts)
  - 2000 – Runner-up (17 pts)
  - 2001 – 3rd place (15 pts)
  - 2002 – 4th place (13 pts)
  - 2003 – Finnish Champion (20 pts)

== See also ==
- Finland national speedway team
