= Kauko Nieminen =

Finnish speedway rider

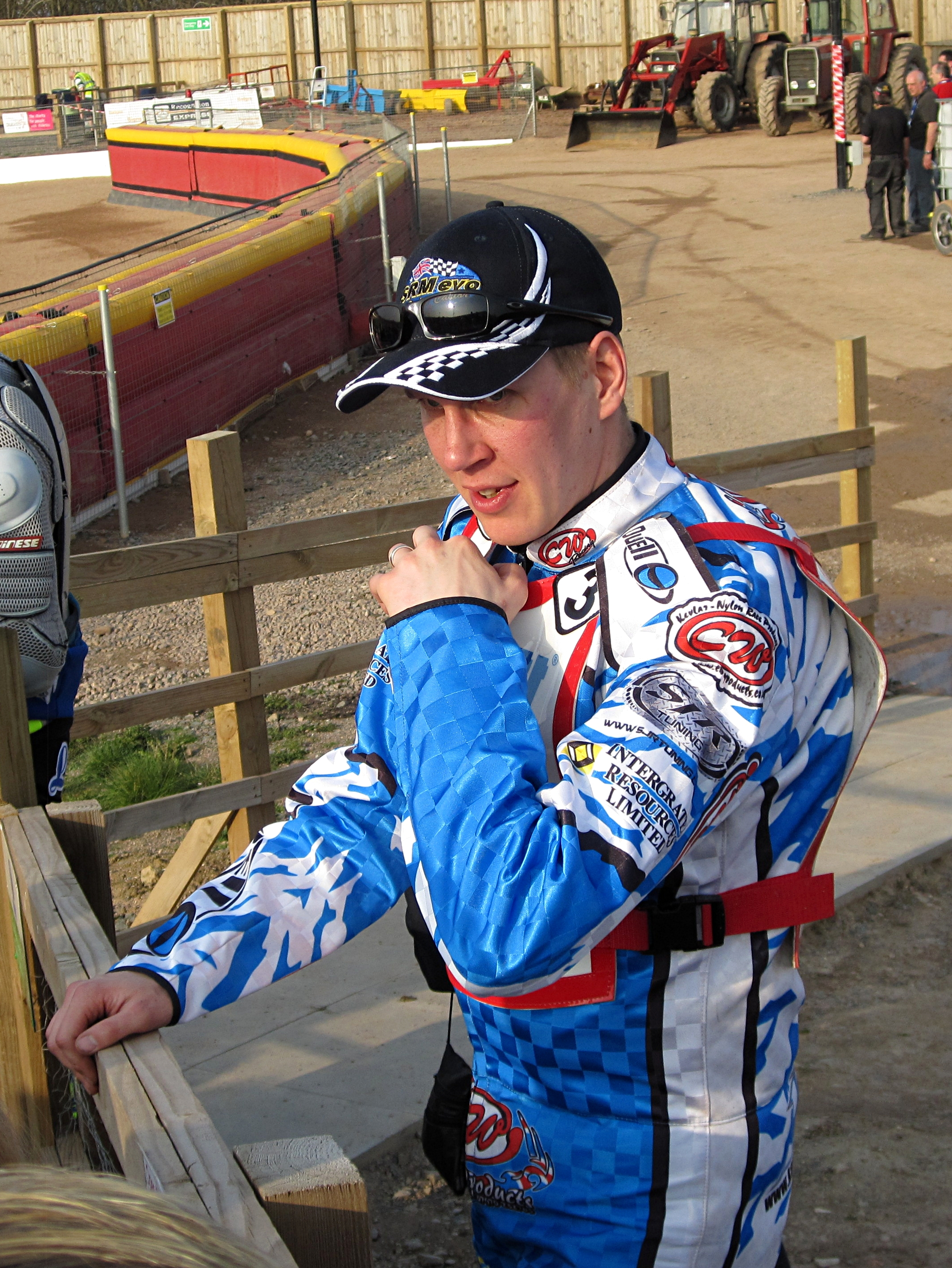
- Born: 29 August 1979 (age 47); Seinäjoki, Finland
- Nickname: Kake, Nemo, Flying Finn
- Nationality: Finnish

Career history

Great Britain
- 2002-05, 2007-08: Workington Comets
- 2006, 2015: Glasgow Tigers
- 2008–2011: Lakeside Hammers
- 2011–2013: Leicester Lions
- 2013: Belle Vue Aces

Poland
- 2007: Lublin
- 2008-2012: Poznań

Sweden
- 2000: Smederna
- 2001-2003: Örnarna
- 2005, 2008, 2015: Griparna
- 2014-2016: Rospiggarna

Individual honours
- 1998, 1999, 2000,2016: Finnish under-21 champion
- 2009, 2010, 2011: Finnish champion

Team honours
- 2004, 2008: Premier League Fours Champion
- 2008: Premier League Pairs Champion
- 2000: Finland 1st Division Champion
- 2001, 2004: Allsvenskan Winner
- 2009: Elite League KO Cup

Kauko Tapio Nieminen (born 29 August 1979, in Seinäjoki) is a Finnish former speedway rider who earned 18 caps for the Finland national speedway team.

== Career summary ==
Nieminen started his United Kingdom career with the Workington Comets in 2002 and was with them every season until 2008 except for 2006, when he rode for the Glasgow Tigers.

In 2004, Nieminen was part of the Workington four that won the Premier League Four-Team Championship, which was held on 21 August 2004, at the Derwent Park.

In 2006, Nieminen represented Finland in the 2006 Speedway World Cup.

Nieminen was known by both Workington and Glasgow fans as 'The Flyin Finn' because of his racing style, which produces some high speed passing. In the 2007 season, Nieminen returned to the Workington Comets, this time as captain, and also rode for Solkatterna in Sweden and TŻ Lublin in Poland. At the end of the season, it was announced he would return the Comets in 2008 and he won the Premier League Pairs Championship partnering Daniel Nermark for Workington, during the 2008 Premier League speedway season, in addition to winning the Premier League Four-Team Championship, held on 26 July 2008, at Derwent Park.

Nieminen's good form in 2008 was noticed by the Elite League team Lakeside Hammers, and he was signed to the squad to cover for injuries. Nieminen was signed as a full team member at Lakeside for the 2009 season. He joined Leicester Lions in July 2011, becoming the team captain and finishing third in the 2011 Premier League Riders' Championship.

Nieminen became national champion of Finland for the third consecutive year in September 2011, after winning the Finnish Individual Speedway Championship. In November 2012, Lakeside Hammers announced that Nieminen would be awarded a Testimonial meeting in 2013, with the venue to be decided. On 25 November 2012, Nieminen was named to continue as captain of Leicester again for the 2013 Premier League season, in what would be his third season with that team. He also rode for Belle Vue during the season.

Nieminen's final appearance in the UK was for Glasgow Tigers in 2015.
