= Tero Aarnio =

Finnish motorcycle speedway rider

- Born: 17 April 1984 (age 42); Kuusankoski, Finland
- Nationality: Finnish

Career history

Sweden
- 2002, 2018 -2020: Rospiggarna
- 2021: Dackarna
- 2022–2023: Indianerna
- 2024: Solkatterna
- 2025: Masarna

Great Britain
- 2008–2009: Berwick
- 2010–2013, 2017 2020-2021: Scunthorpe
- 2013: Workington
- 2014: Glasgow
- 2015–2016, 2018: Newcastle
- 2019: Birmingham

Poland
- 2019: Kraków
- 2021: Poznań
- 2022-2023: Tarnów

Denmark
- 2008: Grinsted
- 2018: Fjelsted

Individual honours
- 2020: Finnish national champion
- 2004, 2005: Junior Finnish Champion

Tero Kalevi Aarnio (born 17 April 1984) is a motorcycle speedway rider from Finland.

== Career ==
Aarnio was a member of Finland team at 2007 Speedway World Cup. This led to his signing for Berwick Bandits for the 2008 and 2009 seasons. He then joined Scunthorpe Scorpions in 2010 and 2011, and Workington Comets in 2012 and 2013. For the 2014 and 2015 seasons, he was with Glasgow and Newcastle respectively. Moreover, in the 2016 season with Scunthorpe and returned to Newcastle in 2018. In 2019, he rode for Birmingham.

After being awarded six times at the Finnish Individual Speedway Championship, Aarnio finally won the national title in the 2020 Finnish Individual Speedway Championship, as the champion of Finland.

In 2021 and 2022, Aarnio rode for Scunthorpe again, in the SGB Championship 2021 and the SGB Championship 2022. He also rode for Tarnów in the 2022 Polish Speedway Second League. In 2023, he was part of the Finland team that competed at the 2023 Speedway World Cup in Poland.

== Career details ==
=== World Championships ===
- Team World Championship (Speedway World Team Cup and Speedway World Cup)
  - 2004 – 3rd place in Qualifying round 1
  - 2007 – 8th place
  - 2008 – 2nd place in Qualifying round 2
- Team U-21 World Championship
  - 2005 – 4th place in Qualifying Round 3

=== European Championships ===
- Individual European Championship
  - 2005 – 17th place in Semi-Final C
  - 2007 – 16th place in Semi-Final B
- Individual U-19 European Championship
  - 2002 – 10th place in Semi-Final A
  - 2003 – 12th place in Semi-Final A
- European Pairs Championship
  - 2007 – Terenzano – 4th place (1 pt)

=== Domestic competitions ===
- Individual Finnish Championship
  - 2001 – 12th place (4+0 pts)
  - 2002 – 7th place (9 pts)
  - 2003 – 10th place (6 pts)
  - 2004 – 3rd place (15 pts)
  - 2005 – 3rd place (44 pts)
  - 2006 – 9th place (7 pts)
  - 2008 – 5th place (9+1 pts)
- Individual Junior Finnish Championship
  - 2001 – 9th place (7 pts)
  - 2002 – Runner-up (17 pts)
  - 2003 – Runner-up (17 pts)
  - 2004 – Finnish Champion (25 pts)
  - 2005 – Finnish Champion (25 pts)

== See also ==
- Finland national speedway team
