= Finland national speedway team =

Finnish national motorcycle speedway team

Finland
- Association: Finnish Motorcycling Federation; Suomen Moottoriliitto r.y.
- FIM code: SML
- Nation colour: White and Blue
- SWC Wins: 0

The Finnish national speedway team are one of the teams that compete in international team motorcycle speedway.

== History ==
The Finnish speedway team competed in the inaugural Speedway World Team Cup in 1960, finishing fourth in the Scandinavian round at Odense, Denmark. The team consisted of Kalevi Lahtinen, Antti Pajari, Timo Laine, Valle Seliverstov and Aulis Lethonen.

From 1960 to 1985, the team failed to progress from their qualifying group for the World Cup, due to the fact that they were drawn together in qualifying with two of the world's strongest speedway nations, Denmark and Sweden. The system changed in 1986 but it was not until the 1990 Speedway World Team Cup that the team progressed from qualifying to round two. The team reached the final of the Speedway World Pairs Championship six times, in 1977, 1979, 1980, 1982, 1987 and 1989.

The team reached the World Cup race-off (the round before the final) in 2002 and 2003 but experienced an inert period for nearly two decades. However, an improvement ensued when Finland reached the final of the 2022 Speedway of Nations and they won their first medal when they won the bronze at the 2023 European Pairs Speedway Championship.

== Major tournament finals ==
=== Speedway of Nations ===
Year	Venue	Standings (Pts)	Riders	Pts
2022	(Denmark); Vojens; Vojens Speedway Center	1. Australia (30+6+7); 2. (United Kingdom) Great Britain (32+2); 3. Sweden (30+3); 4. Denmark (28); 5. Czech Republic (27); 6. Poland (26); 7. Finland (16)	Timo Lahti	14
2022	(Denmark); Vojens; Vojens Speedway Center	1. Australia (30+6+7); 2. (United Kingdom) Great Britain (32+2); 3. Sweden (30+3); 4. Denmark (28); 5. Czech Republic (27); 6. Poland (26); 7. Finland (16)	Jesse Mustonen	2
2022	(Denmark); Vojens; Vojens Speedway Center	1. Australia (30+6+7); 2. (United Kingdom) Great Britain (32+2); 3. Sweden (30+3); 4. Denmark (28); 5. Czech Republic (27); 6. Poland (26); 7. Finland (16)	Timi Salonen	0

=== World Pairs Championship ===
Year	Venue	Standings (Pts)	Riders	Pts
1977	(England); Manchester; Hyde Road	1. England (28); 2. Sweden (18); 3. West Germany (18); 4. (Czech Republic) Czechoslovakia (17); 5. New Zealand (17); 6. Finland (14); 7. Australia (12)	Ila Teromaa	7
1977	(England); Manchester; Hyde Road	1. England (28); 2. Sweden (18); 3. West Germany (18); 4. (Czech Republic) Czechoslovakia (17); 5. New Zealand (17); 6. Finland (14); 7. Australia (12)	Kai Niemi	7
1979	(Denmark); Vojens; Vojens Speedway Center	1. Denmark (25); 2. England (24); 3. Poland (20); 4. Australia (19); 5. United States (14); 6. New Zealand (12); 7. Finland (7)	Kai Niemi	7
1979	(Denmark); Vojens; Vojens Speedway Center	1. Denmark (25); 2. England (24); 3. Poland (20); 4. Australia (19); 5. United States (14); 6. New Zealand (12); 7. Finland (7)	Ila Teromaa	0
1980	(Socialist Federal Republic of Yugoslavia); Krsko; Matija Gubec Stadium	1. England (29); 2. Poland (22); 3. Denmark (21); 4. Sweden (18); 5. New Zealand (16); 6. Finland (14); 7. (Socialist Federal Republic of Yugoslavia) Yugoslavia (6)	Ila Teromaa	8
1980	(Socialist Federal Republic of Yugoslavia); Krsko; Matija Gubec Stadium	1. England (29); 2. Poland (22); 3. Denmark (21); 4. Sweden (18); 5. New Zealand (16); 6. Finland (14); 7. (Socialist Federal Republic of Yugoslavia) Yugoslavia (6)	Kai Niemi	6
1982	(Australia); Sydney; Liverpool Speedway	1. United States (30); 2. England (22); 3. Denmark (21); 4. Australia (16); 5. Finland (16); 6. New Zealand (13); 7. (Czech Republic) Czechoslovakia (8)	Kai Niemi	12
1982	(Australia); Sydney; Liverpool Speedway	1. United States (30); 2. England (22); 3. Denmark (21); 4. Australia (16); 5. Finland (16); 6. New Zealand (13); 7. (Czech Republic) Czechoslovakia (8)	Ari Koponen	4
1987	(Czech Republic); Pardubice; Svítkov Stadion	1. Denmark (52); 2. England (44); 3. United States (36); 4. New Zealand (36); 5. (Czech Republic) Czechoslovakia (30); 6. Finland (19); 7. Australia (21); 8. Italy (19); 9. Poland (14)	Olli Tyrväinen	11
1987	(Czech Republic); Pardubice; Svítkov Stadion	1. Denmark (52); 2. England (44); 3. United States (36); 4. New Zealand (36); 5. (Czech Republic) Czechoslovakia (30); 6. Finland (19); 7. Australia (21); 8. Italy (19); 9. Poland (14)	Kai Niemi	8
1989	(Poland); Leszno; Alfred Smoczyk Stadium	1. Denmark (48); 2. Sweden (44); 3. England (37); 4. West Germany (36); 5. Finland (31); 6. Hungary (22); 7. (Czech Republic) Czechoslovakia (25); 8. Italy (15); 9. Poland (11)	Kai Niemi	18
1989	(Poland); Leszno; Alfred Smoczyk Stadium	1. Denmark (48); 2. Sweden (44); 3. England (37); 4. West Germany (36); 5. Finland (31); 6. Hungary (22); 7. (Czech Republic) Czechoslovakia (25); 8. Italy (15); 9. Poland (11)	Olli Tyrväinen	13

== International caps (as of 2022) ==
Since the advent of the Speedway Grand Prix era, international caps earned by riders are largely restricted to international competitions, whereas previously test matches between two teams were a regular occurrence. This means that the number of caps earned by a rider has decreased in the modern era.

Rider	Caps
Aarnio, Tero	7
Hautamäki, Pekka	7
Helminen, Markku	3
Katajisto, Kalle	3
Kokko, Petri	3
Koponen, Ari	17
Lahti, Timo	3
Laukkanen, Kai	15
Mäkinen, Jari	1
Makinen, Rauli	2
Niemi, Kai	22
Nieminen, Kauko	18
Olin, Matti	7
Pajari, Antti	14
Pellinen, Mika	4
Reima, Tomi	13
Teromaa, Ila	8
Teromaa, Pepe	3
Tuoriniemi, Veijo	3
Tyrväinen, Olli	19
Ylinen, Vesa	14

== See also ==
- Motorcycle speedway
