= 1995 Speedway Grand Prix of Sweden =

Information
- Date: 12 August 1995
- City: (Sweden) Linköping
- Event: 4 of 6 (4)
- Referee: (Netherlands) Hennie Van den Boomen

Stadium details
- Stadium: Motorstadium
- Track: speedway track

SGP Results
- Best Time
- (gold) Winner: (Denmark) Tommy Knudsen
- (silver) Runner-up: (Sweden) Tony Rickardsson
- (bronze) 3rd place: (United States) Tony Rickardsson

The 1995 Speedway Grand Prix of Sweden was the fourth race of the 1995 Speedway Grand Prix season. It took place on 12 August in the Motorstadium in Linköping, Sweden.

== Starting positions draw ==
The Speedway Grand Prix Commission nominated Peter Karlsson as Wild Card.

== Heat details ==
Placing	Draw	Rider	Total	1	2	3	4	5	6	7	8	9	10	11	12	13	14	15	16	17	18	19	20	Pts	Pos	21	22	23	24
1	11	(Denmark) (5) Tommy Knudsen	20			3				3		3					0						3	12	2				3
2	2	(Sweden) (1) Tony Rickardsson	18	3					3				3				3				1			13	1				2
3	7	(United States) (4) Greg Hancock	17		3					2					3	1					2			11	4				1
4	12	(Denmark) (2) Hans Nielsen	16			2					3		1			3						2		11	3				0
5	16	(United Kingdom) (11) Chris Louis	15				1				1	2						1			3			8	7			3
6	4	(Australia) (3) Craig Boyce	14	2							2				2				3				0	9	6			2
7	14	(Sweden) (16) Peter Karlsson	13				2		2					2		2							2	10	5			1
8	6	(United States) (12) Sam Ermolenko	12		2				0			E							2			3		7	8			0
9	5	(United States) (18) Billy Hamill	11		X			1					2					3					1	7	9		3
10	15	(Poland) (13) Tomasz Gollob	10				3			0			0						0	3				6	12		2
11	9	(United Kingdom) (8) Mark Loram	9			0		3						3					X		0			6	11		1
12	10	(Sweden) (7) Henrik Gustafsson	8			1			1						0			2		2				6	10		0
13	3	(United Kingdom) (6) Marvyn Cox	7	0						1				1				0				E		2	16	3
14	8	(United Kingdom) (15) Gary Havelock	6		1						0			0			1			1				3	14	2
15	1	(Sweden) (17) Mikael Karlsson	4	1				0				1				0				0				2	15	1
16	13	(United Kingdom) (14) Andy Smith	3				0	2							1		2					1		6	13	0
17	17	(United States) (9) Josh Larsen	2																					-	17
18	18	(Denmark) (10) Jan Stæchmann	1																					-	18
Placing	Draw	Rider	Total	1	2	3	4	5	6	7	8	9	10	11	12	13	14	15	16	17	18	19	20	Pts	Pos	21	22	23	24

Heat 21 (Final D): Riders placed 13th to 16th Heat 22 (Final C): Riders placed 9th to 12th	Heat 23 (Final B): Riders placed 5th to 8th Heat 24 (Final A): Riders placed 1st to 4th

gate A – inside	gate B	gate C	gate D – outside

== The intermediate classification ==
Qualifies for next season's Grand Prix series
Full-time Grand Prix rider
Wild card, track reserve or qualified reserve

Pos.	Rider	Points	POL (Poland)	AUT (Austria)	GER (Germany)	SWE (Sweden)	DEN (Denmark)	GBR (United Kingdom)
1	(Denmark) (2) Hans Nielsen	69	18	17	18	16		
2	(Sweden) (1) Tony Rickardsson	63	15	18	12	18		
3	(United Kingdom) (11) Chris Louis	55	17	10	13	15		
4	(United States) (18) Billy Hamill	52	4	20	17	11		
5	(Sweden) (7) Henrik Gustafsson	50	12	15	15	8		
6	(United Kingdom) (8) Mark Loram	49	16	16	8	9		
7	(United States) (4) Greg Hancock	48	9	13	9	17		
8	(Poland) (13) Tomasz Gollob	48	20	12	6	10		
9	(United States) (12) Sam Ermolenko	47	14	11	10	12		
10	(Denmark) (5) Tommy Knudsen	44	2	2	20	20		
11	(Australia) (3) Craig Boyce	40	11	8	7	14		
12	(United Kingdom) (6) Marvyn Cox	40	8	14	11	7		
13	(United Kingdom) (14) Andy Smith	32	6	9	14	3		
14	(United Kingdom) (15) Gary Havelock	30	13	7	4	6		
15	(Germany) (16) Gerd Riss	16	–	–	16	–		
16	(Sweden) (16) (19) Peter Karlsson	16	1	1	1	13		
17	(Denmark) (10) Jan Stæchmann	15	7	4	3	1		
18	(Sweden) (17) Mikael Karlsson	12	3	3	2	4		
19	(Poland) (16) Dariusz Śledź	10	10	–	–	–		
20	(Austria) (16) Franz Leitner	6	–	6	–	–		
21	(United States) (9) Josh Larsen	2	–	–	–	2		
Pos.	Rider	Points	POL (Poland)	AUT (Austria)	GER (Germany)	SWE (Sweden)	DEN (Denmark)	GBR (United Kingdom)

== See also ==
- Speedway Grand Prix
- List of Speedway Grand Prix riders
