= 1995 Speedway Grand Prix of Germany =

Information
- Date: 8 July 1995
- City: (Germany) Abensberg
- Event: 3 of 6 (3)
- Referee: (Norway) Roy Otto

Stadium details
- Stadium: Motorstadion
- Track: speedway track

SGP Results
- Best Time
- (gold) Winner: (Denmark) Tommy Knudsen
- (silver) Runner-up: (Denmark) Hans Nielsen
- (bronze) 3rd place: (United States) Hans Nielsen

The 1995 Speedway Grand Prix of Germany was the third race of the 1995 Speedway Grand Prix season. It took place on 8 July in the Motorstadion in Abensberg, Germany and was won by Danish rider Tommy Knudsen.

== Starting positions draw ==
The Speedway Grand Prix Commission nominated Gerd Riss as wild card. Josh Larsen was replaced by Jan Stæchmann. Second track reserve rider was replaced by Peter Karlsson.

Draw 11. (United States) (9) Josh Larsen → (Denmark) (10) Jan Stæchmann
Draw 17. (Denmark) (10) Jan Stæchmann → (Sweden) (17) Mikael Karlsson
Draw 18. (Sweden) (17) Mikael Karlsson → (Sweden) (19) Peter Karlsson

== Heat details ==
Placing	Draw	Rider	Total	1	2	3	4	5	6	7	8	9	10	11	12	13	14	15	16	17	18	19	20	Pts	Pos	21	22	23	24
1	9	(Denmark) (5) Tommy Knudsen	20			3		3						3					3		F			12	2				3
2	7	(Denmark) (2) Hans Nielsen	18		3					3					3	3					3			15	1				2
3	1	(United States) (18) Billy Hamill	17	3				1				3				2				2				11	4				1
4	16	(Germany) (16) Gerd Riss	16				3				3	1						3			2			12	3				0
5	12	(Sweden) (7) Henrik Gustafsson	15			2					2		2			1						3		10	5			3
6	8	(United Kingdom) (14) Andy Smith	14		1						1			2			2			3				9	6			2
7	14	(United Kingdom) (11) Chris Louis	13				0		3					1		0							3	7	8			1
8	2	(Sweden) (1) Tony Rickardsson	12	2					E				3				3				X			8	7			E
9	13	(United Kingdom) (6) Marvyn Cox	11				1	2							1		1					2		7	10		3
10	10	(United States) (12) Sam Ermolenko	10			1			1						2			2		1				7	9		2
11	6	(United States) (4) Greg Hancock	9		0				2			2							0			1		5	12		1
12	15	(United Kingdom) (8) Mark Loram	8				2			1			1						2	0				6	11		0
13	3	(Australia) (3) Craig Boyce	7	1						2				0				0				0		3	13	3
14	5	(Poland) (13) Tomasz Gollob	6		2			0					0					1					0	3	15	2
15	4	(United Kingdom) (15) Gary Havelock	4	0							E				0				1				2	3	14	1
16	11	(Denmark) (10) Jan Stæchmann	3			0				0		E					0						1	1	16	0
17	17	(Sweden) (17) Mikael Karlsson	2																					-	17
18	18	(Sweden) (19) Peter Karlsson	1																					-	18
Placing	Draw	Rider	Total	1	2	3	4	5	6	7	8	9	10	11	12	13	14	15	16	17	18	19	20	Pts	Pos	21	22	23	24

Heat 21 (Final D): Riders placed 13th to 16th Heat 22 (Final C): Riders placed 9th to 12th	Heat 23 (Final B): Riders placed 5th to 8th Heat 24 (Final A): Riders placed 1st to 4th

gate A – inside	gate B	gate C	gate D – outside

== The intermediate classification ==
Qualifies for next season's Grand Prix series
Full-time Grand Prix rider
Wild card, track reserve or qualified reserve

Pos.	Rider	Points	POL (Poland)	AUT (Austria)	GER (Germany)	SWE (Sweden)	DEN (Denmark)	GBR (United Kingdom)
1	(Denmark) (2) Hans Nielsen	53	18	17	18			
2	(Sweden) (1) Tony Rickardsson	45	15	18	12			
3	(Sweden) (7) Henrik Gustafsson	42	12	15	15			
4	(United States) (18) Billy Hamill	41	4	20	17			
5	(United Kingdom) (8) Mark Loram	40	16	16	8			
6	(United Kingdom) (11) Chris Louis	40	17	10	13			
7	(Poland) (13) Tomasz Gollob	38	20	12	6			
8	(United States) (12) Sam Ermolenko	35	14	11	10			
9	(United Kingdom) (6) Marvyn Cox	33	8	14	11			
10	(United States) (4) Greg Hancock	31	9	13	9			
11	(United Kingdom) (14) Andy Smith	29	6	9	14			
12	(Australia) (3) Craig Boyce	26	11	8	7			
13	(Denmark) (5) Tommy Knudsen	24	2	2	20			
14	(United Kingdom) (15) Gary Havelock	24	13	7	4			
15	(Germany) (16) Gerd Riss	16	–	–	16			
16	(Denmark) (10) Jan Stæchmann	14	7	4	3			
17	(Poland) (16) Dariusz Śledź	10	10	–	–			
18	(Sweden) (17) Mikael Karlsson	8	3	3	2			
19	(Austria) (16) Franz Leitner	6	–	6	–			
20	(Sweden) (19) Peter Karlsson	3	1	1	1			
Rider(s) not classified
	(United States) (9) Josh Larsen	—	–	–	–			
Pos.	Rider	Points	POL (Poland)	AUT (Austria)	GER (Germany)	SWE (Sweden)	DEN (Denmark)	GBR (United Kingdom)

== See also ==
- Speedway Grand Prix
- List of Speedway Grand Prix riders
