= 1995 Speedway Grand Prix of Austria =

Information
- Date: 17 June 1995
- City: (Austria) Wiener Neustadt
- Event: 2 of 6 (2)
- Referee: Hennie Van den Boomen

Stadium details
- Stadium: ÖAMTC Zweigverein
- Length: 387 m (423 yd)
- Track: speedway track

SGP Results
- Best Time
- (gold) Winner: (United States) Billy Hamill
- (silver) Runner-up: (Sweden) Tony Rickardsson
- (bronze) 3rd place: (Denmark) Hans Nielsen

The 1995 Speedway Grand Prix of Austria was the second race of the 1995 Speedway Grand Prix season. It took place on 17 June in the Stadion Wiener Neustadt (called the ÖAMTC Zweigverein Stadium at the time for sponsorship reasons) in Wiener Neustadt, Austria.

== Starting positions draw ==
The Speedway Grand Prix Commission nominated Franz Leitner as Wild Card. Josh Larsen was replaced by Peter Karlsson.

Draw 18. (United States) (9) Josh Larsen → (Sweden) (19) Peter Karlsson

== Heat details ==
Placing	Draw	Rider	Total	1	2	3	4	5	6	7	8	9	10	11	12	13	14	15	16	17	18	19	20	Pts	Pos	21	22	23	24
1	1	(United States) (18) Billy Hamill	20	3				1				1				2				3				10	3				3
2	11	(Sweden) (1) Tony Rickardsson	18			3				3		3					3						3	15	1				2
3	13	(Denmark) (2) Hans Nielsen	17				3	3							3		2					3		14	2				1
4	4	(United Kingdom) (8) Mark Loram	16	2							2				1				2				2	9	4				0
5	12	(Sweden) (7) Henrik Gustafsson	15			1					3		3			1						1		9	5			3
6	7	(United Kingdom) (6) Marvyn Cox	14		0					1					2	3					3			9	6			2
7	14	(United States) (4) Greg Hancock	13				2		3					1		0							1	7	7			1
8	5	(Poland) (13) Tomasz Gollob	12		3			0					2					1					0	6	8			0
9	9	(United States) (12) Sam Ermolenko	11			0		2						2					0		1			5	12		3
10	6	(United Kingdom) (11) Chris Louis	10		1				2			E							1			2		6	9		2
11	15	(United Kingdom) (14) Andy Smith	9				1			0			1						3	1				6	11		1
12	8	(Australia) (3) Craig Boyce	8		2						1			0			1			2				6	10		0
13	3	(United Kingdom) (15) Gary Havelock	7	0						2				3				0				0		5	13	3
14	16	(Austria) (16) Franz Leitner	6				0				0	2						3			0			5	14	2
15	10	(Denmark) (10) Jan Stæchmann	4			2			E						0			2		E				4	16	1
16	2	(Sweden) (17) Mikael Karlsson	3	1					1				0				0				2			4	15	0
17	17	(Denmark) (5) Tommy Knudsen	2																					-	17
18	18	(Sweden) (19) Peter Karlsson	1																					-	18
Placing	Draw	Rider	Total	1	2	3	4	5	6	7	8	9	10	11	12	13	14	15	16	17	18	19	20	Pts	Pos	21	22	23	24

Heat 21 (Final D): Riders placed 13th to 16th Heat 22 (Final C): Riders placed 9th to 12th	Heat 23 (Final B): Riders placed 5th to 8th Heat 24 (Final A): Riders placed 1st to 4th

gate A – inside	gate B	gate C	gate D – outside

== The intermediate classification ==
Qualifies for next season's Grand Prix series
Full-time Grand Prix rider
Wild card, track reserve or qualified reserve

Pos.	Rider	Points	POL (Poland)	AUT (Austria)	GER (Germany)	SWE (Sweden)	DEN (Denmark)	GBR (United Kingdom)
1	(Denmark) (2) Hans Nielsen	35	18	17				
2	(Sweden) (1) Tony Rickardsson	33	15	18				
3	(United Kingdom) (8) Mark Loram	32	16	16				
4	(Poland) (13) Tomasz Gollob	32	20	12				
5	(Sweden) (7) Henrik Gustafsson	27	12	15				
6	(United Kingdom) (11) Chris Louis	27	17	10				
7	(United States) (12) Sam Ermolenko	25	14	11				
8	(United States) (18) Billy Hamill	24	4	20				
9	(United States) (4) Greg Hancock	22	9	13				
10	(United Kingdom) (6) Marvyn Cox	22	8	14				
11	(United Kingdom) (15) Gary Havelock	20	13	7				
12	(Australia) (3) Craig Boyce	19	11	8				
13	(United Kingdom) (14) Andy Smith	15	6	9				
14	(Denmark) (10) Jan Stæchmann	11	7	4				
15	(Poland) (16) Dariusz Śledź	10	10	–				
16	(Austria) (16) Franz Leitner	6	–	6				
17	(Sweden) (17) Mikael Karlsson	6	3	3				
18	(Denmark) (5) Tommy Knudsen	4	2	2				
19	(Sweden) (19) Peter Karlsson	2	1	1				
Rider(s) not classified
	(United States) (9) Josh Larsen	—	–	–				
Pos.	Rider	Points	POL (Poland)	AUT (Austria)	GER (Germany)	SWE (Sweden)	DEN (Denmark)	GBR (United Kingdom)

== See also ==
- Speedway Grand Prix of Austria
- Speedway Grand Prix
- List of Speedway Grand Prix riders
