= 1995 Speedway Grand Prix of Great Britain =

(United Kingdom) 1995 Speedway Grand Prix of Great Britain

Information
- Date: 30 September 1995
- City: (United Kingdom) London
- Event: 6 of 6 (6)
- Referee: (Norway) Roy Otto

Stadium details
- Stadium: Hackney Wick Stadium
- Track: speedway track

SGP Results
- Best Time
- (gold) Winner: (United States) Greg Hancock
- (silver) Runner-up: (United States) Sam Ermolenko
- (bronze) 3rd place: (United Kingdom) Mark Loram

The 1995 Speedway Grand Prix of Great Britain was the six and last race of the 1995 Speedway Grand Prix season. It took place on 30 September in the Hackney Wick Stadium in London, England.

== Starting positions draw ==
The Speedway Grand Prix Commission nominated Jason Crump as Wild Card.

== Heat details ==
Placing	Draw	Rider	Total	1	2	3	4	5	6	7	8	9	10	11	12	13	14	15	16	17	18	19	20	Pts	Pos	21	22	23	24
1	16	(United States) (4) Greg Hancock	20				3				3	2						2			3			13	1				3
2	3	(United States) (12) Sam Ermolenko	18	2						3				2				3				2		12	3				2
3	9	(United Kingdom) (8) Mark Loram	17			3		3						1					2		2			11	4				1
4	6	(Sweden) (7) Henrik Gustafsson	16		3				2			1							3			3		12	2				0
5	13	(United States) (18) Billy Hamill	15				2	2							1		1					1		7	8			3
6	11	(Denmark) (2) Hans Nielsen	14			X				1		3					3						2	9	7			2
7	14	(United Kingdom) (15) Gary Havelock	13				1		0					3		3							3	10	6			1
8	2	(Australia) (16) Jason Crump	12	3					3				3				2				0			11	5			E
9	5	(Denmark) (5) Tommy Knudsen	11		2			1					2					1					1	7	10		3
10	12	(Australia) (3) Craig Boyce	10			2					2		1			0						0		5	11		2
11	7	(Poland) (13) Tomasz Gollob	9		0					2					3	1					1			7	9		1
12	10	(Sweden) (1) Tony Rickardsson	8			X			1						0			0		3				4	12		0
13	4	(United Kingdom) (11) Chris Louis	7	E							0				2				1				0	3	15	3
14	1	(United Kingdom) (6) Marvyn Cox	6	1				0				0				2				1				4	14	2
15	8	(Sweden) (17) Mikael Karlsson	4		1						1			0			0			2				4	13	1
16	15	(United Kingdom) (14) Andy Smith	3				0			0			0						0	0				0	16	0
17	17	(Denmark) (10) Jan Stæchmann	2																					-	17
18	18	(United States) (9) Josh Larsen	1																					-	18
Placing	Draw	Rider	Total	1	2	3	4	5	6	7	8	9	10	11	12	13	14	15	16	17	18	19	20	Pts	Pos	21	22	23	24

Heat 21 (Final D): Riders placed 13th to 16th Heat 22 (Final C): Riders placed 9th to 12th	Heat 23 (Final B): Riders placed 5th to 8th Heat 24 (Final A): Riders placed 1st to 4th

gate A – inside	gate B	gate C	gate D – outside

== Final classification ==
Qualifies for next season's Grand Prix series
Full-time Grand Prix rider
Wild card, track reserve or qualified reserve

Pos.	Rider	Points	POL (Poland)	AUT (Austria)	GER (Germany)	SWE (Sweden)	DEN (Denmark)	GBR (United Kingdom)
Gold	(Denmark) (2) Hans Nielsen	103	18	17	18	16	20	14
Silver	(Sweden) (1) Tony Rickardsson	88	15	18	12	18	17	8
Bronze	(United States) (12) Sam Ermolenko	83	14	11	10	12	18	18
4	(United States) (4) Greg Hancock	82	9	13	9	17	14	20
5	(United States) (18) Billy Hamill	80	4	20	17	11	13	15
6	(United Kingdom) (8) Mark Loram	77	16	16	8	9	11	17
7	(United Kingdom) (11) Chris Louis	77	17	10	13	15	15	7
8	(Sweden) (7) Henrik Gustafsson	73 (+3)	12	15	15	8	7	16
9	(Poland) (13) Tomasz Gollob	73 (+2)	20	12	6	10	16	9
10	(Denmark) (5) Tommy Knudsen	67	2	2	20	20	12	11
11	(Australia) (3) Craig Boyce	60	11	8	7	14	10	10
12	(United Kingdom) (6) Marvyn Cox	54	8	14	11	7	8	6
13	(United Kingdom) (15) Gary Havelock	45	13	7	4	6	2	13
14	(United Kingdom) (14) Andy Smith	38	6	9	14	3	3	3
15	(Denmark) (10) Jan Stæchmann	23	7	4	3	1	6	2
16	(Sweden) (17) Mikael Karlsson	17	3	3	2	4	1	4
17	(Germany) (16) Gerd Riss	16	–	–	16	–	–	–
18	(Sweden) (16) (19) Peter Karlsson	16	1	1	1	13	–	–
19	(Australia) (16) Jason Crump	12	–	–	–	–	–	12
20	(Poland) (16) Dariusz Śledź	10	10	–	–	–	–	–
21	(Norway) (16) Lars Gunnestad	9	–	–	–	–	9	–
22	(United States) (9) Josh Larsen	7	–	–	–	2	4	1
23	(Austria) (16) Franz Leitner	6	–	6	–	–	–	–
Pos.	Rider	Points	POL (Poland)	AUT (Austria)	GER (Germany)	SWE (Sweden)	DEN (Denmark)	GBR (United Kingdom)

== See also ==
- Speedway Grand Prix
- List of Speedway Grand Prix riders
