= 1995 Speedway Grand Prix of Denmark =

Information
- Date: 9 September 1995
- City: (Denmark) Vojens
- Event: 5 of 6 (5)
- Referee: (Hungary) Jenő Koroknai

Stadium details
- Stadium: Speedway Center
- Track: speedway track

SGP Results
- Best Time
- (gold) Winner: (Denmark) Hans Nielsen
- (silver) Runner-up: (United States) Sam Ermolenko
- (bronze) 3rd place: (Sweden) Sam Ermolenko

The 1995 Speedway Grand Prix of Denmark was the fifth race of the 1995 Speedway Grand Prix season. It took place on 9 September in the Speedway Center in Vojens, Denmark.

== Starting positions draw ==
The Speedway Grand Prix Commission nominated Lars Gunnestad as Wild Card.

== Heat details ==
Placing	Draw	Rider	Total	1	2	3	4	5	6	7	8	9	10	11	12	13	14	15	16	17	18	19	20	Pts	Pos	21	22	23	24
1	10	(Denmark) (2) Hans Nielsen	20			1			1						3			2		3				10	3				3
2	2	(United States) (12) Sam Ermolenko	18	3					2				3				3				3			14	1				2
3	11	(Sweden) (1) Tony Rickardsson	17			2				2		3					1						2	10	4				1
4	6	(Poland) (13) Tomasz Gollob	16		1				3			2							2			3		11	2				0
5	3	(United Kingdom) (11) Chris Louis	15	0						1				3				3				2		9	8			3
6	15	(United States) (4) Greg Hancock	14				2			3			1						3	E				9	7			2
7	5	(United States) (18) Billy Hamill	13		2			2					2					1					3	10	6			1
8	9	(Denmark) (5) Tommy Knudsen	12			3		3						2					0		2			10	5			0
9	4	(United Kingdom) (8) Mark Loram	11	1							3				2				1				0	7	10		3
10	14	(Australia) (3) Craig Boyce	10				3		0					1		3							1	8	9		2
11	13	(Norway) (16) Lars Gunnestad	9				1	1							1		2					1		6	12		1
12	1	(United Kingdom) (6) Marvyn Cox	8	2				0				1				1				2				6	11		0
13	7	(Sweden) (7) Henrik Gustafsson	7		3					0					0	2					0			5	13	3
14	16	(Denmark) (10) Jan Stæchmann	6				E				2	0						0			1			3	14	2
15	12	(United States) (9) Josh Larsen	4			0					0		0			0						0		0	16	1
16	8	(United Kingdom) (14) Andy Smith	3		0						1			0			0			1				2	15	0
17	17	(United Kingdom) (15) Gary Havelock	2																					-	17
18	18	(Sweden) (17) Mikael Karlsson	1																					-	18
Placing	Draw	Rider	Total	1	2	3	4	5	6	7	8	9	10	11	12	13	14	15	16	17	18	19	20	Pts	Pos	21	22	23	24

Heat 21 (Final D): Riders placed 13th to 16th Heat 22 (Final C): Riders placed 9th to 12th	Heat 23 (Final B): Riders placed 5th to 8th Heat 24 (Final A): Riders placed 1st to 4th

gate A – inside	gate B	gate C	gate D – outside

== The intermediate classification ==
Qualifies for next season's Grand Prix series
Full-time Grand Prix rider
Wild card, track reserve or qualified reserve

Pos.	Rider	Points	POL (Poland)	AUT (Austria)	GER (Germany)	SWE (Sweden)	DEN (Denmark)	GBR (United Kingdom)
1	(Denmark) (2) Hans Nielsen	89	18	17	18	16	20	
2	(Sweden) (1) Tony Rickardsson	80	15	18	12	18	17	
3	(United Kingdom) (11) Chris Louis	70	17	10	13	15	15	
4	(United States) (12) Sam Ermolenko	65	14	11	10	12	18	
5	(United States) (18) Billy Hamill	65	4	20	17	11	13	
6	(Poland) (13) Tomasz Gollob	64	20	12	6	10	16	
7	(United States) (4) Greg Hancock	62	9	13	9	17	14	
8	(United Kingdom) (8) Mark Loram	60	16	16	8	9	11	
9	(Sweden) (7) Henrik Gustafsson	57	12	15	15	8	7	
10	(Denmark) (5) Tommy Knudsen	56	2	2	20	20	12	
11	(Australia) (3) Craig Boyce	50	11	8	7	14	10	
12	(United Kingdom) (6) Marvyn Cox	48	8	14	11	7	8	
13	(United Kingdom) (14) Andy Smith	35	6	9	14	3	3	
14	(United Kingdom) (15) Gary Havelock	32	13	7	4	6	2	
15	(Denmark) (10) Jan Stæchmann	21	7	4	3	1	6	
16	(Germany) (16) Gerd Riss	16	–	–	16	–	–	
17	(Sweden) (16) (19) Peter Karlsson	16	1	1	1	13	–	
18	(Sweden) (17) Mikael Karlsson	13	3	3	2	4	1	
19	(Poland) (16) Dariusz Śledź	10	10	–	–	–	–	
20	(Norway) (16) Lars Gunnestad	9	–	–	–	–	9	
21	(United States) (9) Josh Larsen	6	–	–	–	2	4	
22	(Austria) (16) Franz Leitner	6	–	6	–	–	–	
Pos.	Rider	Points	POL (Poland)	AUT (Austria)	GER (Germany)	SWE (Sweden)	DEN (Denmark)	GBR (United Kingdom)

== See also ==
- Speedway Grand Prix
- List of Speedway Grand Prix riders
