= 1995 Speedway Grand Prix of Poland =

Polish speedway race

Information
- Date: 20 May 1995
- City: (Poland) Wrocław
- Event: 1 of 6 (1)
- Referee: (Netherlands) Hennie Van den Boomen

Stadium details
- Stadium: Olympic Stadium
- Length: 387 m (423 yd)
- Track: speedway track

SGP Results
- Best Time
- (gold) Winner: (Poland) Tomasz Gollob
- (silver) Runner-up: (Denmark) Hans Nielsen
- (bronze) 3rd place: (United Kingdom) Chris Louis

The 1995 Speedway Grand Prix of Poland was the first race of the 1995 Speedway Grand Prix season. It took place on 20 May in the Olympic Stadium in Wrocław, Poland.

== Starting positions draw ==
The Speedway Grand Prix Commission nominated Dariusz Śledź as Wild Card. Josh Larsen was replaced by Mikael Karlsson

Draw 10. (United States) (9) Josh Larsen → (Sweden) (17) Mikael Karlsson
Draw 17. (Sweden) (17) Mikael Karlsson → (United States) (18) Billy Hamill
Draw 18. (United States) (18) Billy Hamill → (Sweden) (19) Peter Karlsson

== Heat details ==
Placing	Draw	Rider	Total	1	2	3	4	5	6	7	8	9	10	11	12	13	14	15	16	17	18	19	20	Pts	Pos	21	22	23	24
1	1	(Poland) (13) Tomasz Gollob	20	2				2				2				2				3				11	4				3
2	11	(Denmark) (2) Hans Nielsen	18			2				3		3					3						3	14	1				2
3	3	(United Kingdom) (11) Chris Louis	17	3						1				3				3				2		12	2				1
4	12	(United Kingdom) (8) Mark Loram	16			3					3		2			3						0		11	3				0
5	4	(Sweden) (1) Tony Rickardsson	15	1							2				3				3				X	9	6			3
6	5	(United States) (12) Sam Ermolenko	14		3			3					0					2					2	10	5			2
7	2	(United Kingdom) (15) Gary Havelock	13	0					3				1				2				2			8	7			1
8	8	(Sweden) (7) Henrik Gustafsson	12		2						1			2			1			2				8	8			0
9	13	(Australia) (3) Craig Boyce	11				3	0							1		0					1		5	10		3
10	16	(Poland) (16) Dariusz Śledź	10				1				0	X						1			3			5	12		2
11	15	(United States) (4) Greg Hancock	9				2			2			3						0	0				7	9		1
12	14	(United Kingdom) (6) Marvyn Cox	8				0		2					1		1							1	5	11		0
13	7	(Denmark) (10) Jan Stæchmann	7		0					0					2	0					0			2	16	3
14	9	(United Kingdom) (14) Andy Smith	6			1		1						0					2		1			5	13	2
15	17	(United States) (18) Billy Hamill	4									1										3		4	14	1
16	10	(Sweden) (17) Mikael Karlsson	3			0			1						0			0		1				2	15	0
17	6	(Denmark) (5) Tommy Knudsen	2		1				X			-							-			-		1	17
18	18	(Sweden) (19) Peter Karlsson	1																1					1	18
Placing	Draw	Rider	Total	1	2	3	4	5	6	7	8	9	10	11	12	13	14	15	16	17	18	19	20	Pts	Pos	21	22	23	24

Heat 21 (Final D): Riders placed 13th to 16th Heat 22 (Final C): Riders placed 9th to 12th	Heat 23 (Final B): Riders placed 5th to 8th Heat 24 (Final A): Riders placed 1st to 4th

gate A – inside	gate B	gate C	gate D – outside

== The intermediate classification ==
Qualifies for next season's Grand Prix series
Full-time Grand Prix rider
Wild card, track reserve or qualified reserve

Pos.	Rider	Points	POL (Poland)	AUT (Austria)	GER (Germany)	SWE (Sweden)	DEN (Denmark)	GBR (United Kingdom)
1	(Poland) (13) Tomasz Gollob	20	20					
2	(Denmark) (2) Hans Nielsen	18	18					
3	(United Kingdom) (11) Chris Louis	17	17					
4	(United Kingdom) (8) Mark Loram	16	16					
5	(Sweden) (1) Tony Rickardsson	15	15					
6	(United States) (12) Sam Ermolenko	14	14					
7	(United Kingdom) (15) Gary Havelock	13	13					
8	(Sweden) (7) Henrik Gustafsson	12	12					
9	(Australia) (3) Craig Boyce	11	11					
10	(Poland) (16) Dariusz Śledź	10	10					
11	(United States) (4) Greg Hancock	9	9					
12	(United Kingdom) (6) Marvyn Cox	8	8					
13	(Denmark) (10) Jan Stæchmann	7	7					
14	(United Kingdom) (14) Andy Smith	6	6					
15	(United States) (18) Billy Hamill	4	4					
16	(Sweden) (17) Mikael Karlsson	3	3					
17	(Denmark) (5) Tommy Knudsen	2	2					
18	(Sweden) (19) Peter Karlsson	1	1					
Rider(s) not classified
	(United States) (9) Josh Larsen	—	–					
Pos.	Rider	Points	POL (Poland)	AUT (Austria)	GER (Germany)	SWE (Sweden)	DEN (Denmark)	GBR (United Kingdom)

== See also ==
- Speedway Grand Prix
- List of Speedway Grand Prix riders
