= Commonwealth final =

Motorcycle speedway race

The Commonwealth final was a Motorcycle speedway final sanctioned by the FIM as a qualifying round for the Speedway World Championship between 1979 and 1994.

Introduced to the World Championship in 1979, it served as a qualifying round for Commonwealth riders, primarily those from Australia, England and New Zealand.

The Commonwealth final was not run from 1981 to 1985, during which time riders who qualified through their national championship were through to the Overseas Final. It returned to the World Championship calendar in 1986 and lasted until 1994, the last year of the traditional single meeting World Championship final before the advent of the Speedway Grand Prix World championship series in 1995.

== Editions ==
All 11 Commonwealth finals were held in England. Kelvin Tatum was the most successful Commonwealth finalist, winning four finals (1987, 1988, 1990 and 1992). Reigning Australian Champion Leigh Adams was the only non-English winner when he took out the 1993 Final.

Year	Venue	Winners	Runner-up	3rd place
1979	(England) London; White City Stadium	(England) Michael Lee	(Australia) Billy Sanders	(England) Dave Jessup
1980	(England) London; Wimbledon Stadium	(England) Dave Jessup	(England) John Louis	(New Zealand) Ivan Mauger
1981-1985 - not held
1986	(England) Manchester; Belle Vue Stadium	(England) Jeremy Doncaster	(England) Kelvin Tatum	(England) Chris Morton
1987	(England) Manchester; Belle Vue Stadium	(England) Kelvin Tatum	(England) Simon Cross	(England) Marvyn Cox
1988	(England) King's Lynn; Norfolk Arena	(England) Kelvin Tatum	(New Zealand) Mitch Shirra	(England) Simon Wigg
1989	(England) Manchester; Belle Vue Stadium	(England) Simon Wigg	(New Zealand) Mitch Shirra	(England) Neil Collins
1990	(England) Manchester; Belle Vue Stadium	(England) Kelvin Tatum	(England) Martin Dugard	(England) Simon Cross
1991	(England) King's Lynn; Norfolk Arena	(England) Jeremy Doncaster	(Australia) Leigh Adams	(England) Joe Screen
1992	(England) King's Lynn; Norfolk Arena	(England) Kelvin Tatum	(New Zealand) Mark Thorpe	(England) Gary Havelock
1993	(England) King's Lynn; Norfolk Arena	(Australia) Leigh Adams	(England) Andy Smith	(England) Martin Dugard
1994	(England) King's Lynn; Norfolk Arena	(England) Mark Loram	(England) Martin Dugard	(England) Joe Screen

== See also ==
- Speedway World Championship
- Speedway Grand Prix
- Motorcycle speedway
