= 1992 Commonwealth final =

1992 Commonwealth Final

Seasons
- ← 1991 1993 →

The 1992 Commonwealth final was the ninth running of the Commonwealth Final as part of the qualification for the 1992 Speedway World Championship. The 1992 Final was run on 31 May at the Norfolk Arena in King's Lynn, England, and was part of the World Championship qualifying for riders from the Commonwealth nations.

Riders qualified for the Final from the Australian, British and New Zealand Championships.

== 1992 Commonwealth final ==
- 31 May
- (England) King's Lynn, Norfolk Arena
- Qualification: Top 11 plus 1 reserve to the Overseas Final in Coventry, England

| Pos. | Rider | Total |
|---|---|---|
| 1 | (England) Kelvin Tatum | 11+3 |
| 2 | (New Zealand) Mark Thorpe | 11+2 |
| 3 | (England) Gary Havelock | 11+1 |
| 4 | (England) Marvyn Cox | 10 |
| 5 | (England) Martin Dugard | 9 |
| 6 | (New Zealand) Mitch Shirra | 9 |
| 7 | (England) Simon Wigg | 8 |
| 8 | (England) Paul Thorp | 8 |
| 9 | (Australia) Jason Lyons | 8 |
| 10 | (England) Andy Smith | 7 |
| 11 | (Australia) Shane Parker | 6+3 |
| 12 | (England) Mark Loram | 6+2 |
| 13 | (England) Chris Louis | 5 |
| 14 | (Australia) Leigh Adams | 5 |
| 15 | (England) Dave Mullett | 5 |
| 16 | (Australia) Mark Carlson | 1 |

== See also ==
- Motorcycle Speedway
