= 1994 Commonwealth final =

1994 Commonwealth Final

Seasons
- ← 1993 none →

The 1994 Commonwealth final was the 11th running of the Commonwealth Final as part of the qualification for the 1994 Speedway World Championship. The 1994 Final was run on 22 May at the Norfolk Arena in King's Lynn, England, and was part of the World Championship qualifying for riders from the Commonwealth nations.

Riders qualified for the Final from the Australian, British and New Zealand Championships.

1994 was the last time the Commonwealth Final was run following the introduction of the Speedway Grand Prix in 1995.

== 1994 Commonwealth final ==
- 22 May
- (England) King's Lynn, Norfolk Arena
- Qualification: Top 10 plus 1 reserve to the Overseas Final in Coventry, England

Pos.	Rider	Total
1	(England) Mark Loram	14
2	(England) Martin Dugard	13
3	(England) Joe Screen	12
4	(Australia) Leigh Adams	11
5	(England) Chris Louis	10
6	(England) Jeremy Doncaster	9
7	(Australia) Jason Lyons	8
8	(Australia) Craig Boyce	8
9	(England) Gary Havelock	7
10	(Australia) Jason Crump	7
11	(New Zealand) Mitch Shirra	6
12	(England) Andy Smith	4
13	(England) Steve Schofield	4
14	(New Zealand) Mark Thorpe	3
15	(England) Dean Barker	2
16	(England) Simon Cross	0
Res	(England) Kelvin Tatum	did not ride
Res	(Australia) Shane Parker	did not ride

== Classification ==
Placing	Rider	Total	1	2	3	4	5	6	7	8	9	10	11	12	13	14	15	16	17	18	19	20	Pts	Pos	21
1	(England) (4) Mark Loram	14	3							3				3				2				3	14	1	
2	(England) (15) Martin Dugard	13				2			3			2						3	3				13	2	
3	(England) (5) Joe Screen	12		3			2					3					3					1	12	3	
4	(Australia) (14) Leigh Adams	11				1		3					3		2							2	11	4	
5	(England) (1) Chris Louis	10	1				1				3				3				2				10	5	
6	(England) (13) Jeremy Doncaster	9				3	0							1		2					3		9	6	
7	(Australia) (8) Jason Lyons	8		1						2			2			3			F				8	7	
8	(Australia) (6) Craig Boyce	8		2				2			2							1			1		8	8	
9	(England) (10) Gary Havelock	7			3			1						0			2		1				7	9	
10	(Australia) (3) Jason Crump	7	2						1				1				1				2		7	10	
11	(New Zealand) (9) Mitch Shirra	6			0		3						0					0		3			6	11	
12	(England) (7) Andy Smith	4		F					0					2	0					2			4	12	
13	(England) (11) Steve Schofield	4			2				2		0					F						0	4	13	
14	(New Zealand) (12) Mark Thorpe	3			1					0		1			1						0		3	14	
15	(England) (16) Dean Barker	2				0				1	1						0			E			2	15	
16	(England) (2) Simon Cross	0	0					0				F				-				-			0	16	
R1	(England) (R1) Kelvin Tatum	0																					0	R1	
R2	(Australia) (R2) Shane Parker	0																					0	R2	
Placing	Rider	Total	1	2	3	4	5	6	7	8	9	10	11	12	13	14	15	16	17	18	19	20	Pts	Pos	21

m - exclusion for exceeding two minute time allowance • t - exclusion for touching the tapes • x - other exclusion • e - retired or mechanical failure • f - fell • ns - non-starter • nc - non-classify

gate A - inside	gate B	gate C	gate D - outside

== See also ==
- Motorcycle Speedway
