= 1988 Commonwealth final =

Fifth running of the Commonwealth Final

1988 Commonwealth Final

Seasons
- ← 1987 1989 →

The 1988 Commonwealth final was the fifth running of the Commonwealth Final as part of the qualification for the 1988 Speedway World Championship. The 1988 Final was run on 12 June at the Norfolk Arena in King's Lynn, England, and was part of the World Championship qualifying for riders from the Commonwealth nations.

Riders qualified for the Final from the Australian, British and New Zealand Championships.

== 1988 Commonwealth final ==
- 12 June
- (England) King's Lynn, Norfolk Arena
- Qualification: Top 11 plus 1 reserve to the Overseas Final in Coventry, England

Pos.	Rider	Total
1	(England) Kelvin Tatum	14
2	(New Zealand) Mitch Shirra	13
3	(England) Simon Wigg	12
4	(England) John Davis	11
5	(England) Simon Cross	9
6	(England) Chris Morton	9
7	(England) Neil Evitts	8
8	(England) Andy Smith	8
9	(England) Richard Knight	7
10	(Australia) Craig Hodgson	7
11	(England) Marvyn Cox	7
12	(Australia) Mark Fiora	5
13	(New Zealand) David Bargh	3
14	(Australia) Steve Baker	3
15	(Australia) Steve Regeling	3
16	(New Zealand) Mark Lyndon	1

== See also ==
- Motorcycle Speedway
