= 1987 Commonwealth final =

1987 Commonwealth Final

Seasons
- ← 1986 1988 →

The 1987 Commonwealth final was the fourth running of the Commonwealth Final as part of the qualification for the 1987 Speedway World Championship. The 1987 Final was run on 14 June at the Belle Vue Stadium in Manchester, England, and was part of the World Championship qualifying for riders from the Commonwealth nations.

Riders qualified for the Final from the Australian, British and New Zealand Championships.

== 1987 Commonwealth final ==
- 14 June
- (England) Manchester, Belle Vue Stadium
- Qualification: Top 11 plus 1 reserve to the Overseas Final in Bradford, England

| Pos. | Rider | Total |
|---|---|---|
| 1 | (England) Kelvin Tatum | 14 |
| 2 | (England) Simon Cross | 13 |
| 3 | (England) Marvyn Cox | 10 |
| 4 | (England) Neil Evitts | 10 |
| 5 | (England) Chris Morton | 10 |
| 6 | (New Zealand) David Bargh | 10 |
| 7 | (New Zealand) Mitch Shirra | 10 |
| 8 | (Australia) Steve Regeling | 8 |
| 9 | (England) Andrew Silver | 8 |
| 10 | (England) Paul Thorp | 7 |
| 11 | (England) Jeremy Doncaster | 6+3 |
| 12 | (England) Simon Wigg | 6+2 |
| 13 | (Australia) Steve Baker | 3 |
| 14 | (Australia) Glyn Taylor | 3 |
| 15 | (New Zealand) Alan Mason | 1 |
| 16 | (New Zealand) Ashley Norton | 1 |

== See also ==
- Motorcycle Speedway
