= 1986 Commonwealth final =

1986 Commonwealth Final

Seasons
- ← 1980 1987 →

The 1986 Commonwealth final was the third running of the Commonwealth Final as part of the qualification for the 1986 Speedway World Championship. The 1986 Final was run on 8 June at the Belle Vue Stadium in Manchester, England, and was part of the World Championship qualifying for riders from the Commonwealth nations.

After being missing from the World Championship from 1981 to 1985, the Commonwealth Final returned to the calendar in 1986. Riders qualified for the re-introduced Final from the Australian, British and New Zealand Championships.

- 8 June
- (England) Manchester, Belle Vue Stadium
- Qualification: Top 11 plus 1 reserve to the 1986 Overseas Final in Coventry, England

Pos.	Rider	Heat Scores	Total
1	(England) Jeremy Doncaster	(3,2,3,3,3)	14
2	(England) Kelvin Tatum	(2,3,3,1,3)	12
3	(England) Chris Morton	(2,3,1,2,3)	11
4	(Australia) Steve Baker	(1,1,3,3,1)	9
5	(England) Neil Evitts	(1,1,1,3,3)	9
6	(England) Richard Knight	(3,0,2,2,2)	9
7	(New Zealand) Larry Ross	(0,0,3,3,2)	9
8	(Australia) Phil Crump	(1,3,x,2,2)	8
9	(England) Marvyn Cox	(3,1,2,1,1)	8
10	(England) Paul Thorp	(3,2,1,0,2)	8
11	(New Zealand) Mitch Shirra	(2,0,2,2,1)	7
12	(New Zealand) David Bargh	(1,3,f,1,1)	6
13	(England) Phil Collins	(2,2,0,1,0)	5
14	(England) Malcolm Simmons	(0,1,2,0,0)	3
15	(Australia) Steve Regeling	(0,2,1,e,0)	3
16	(Australia) Allan Rivett	(0,0,0,e,0)	0

== Classification ==
Placing	Rider	Total	1	2	3	4	5	6	7	8	9	10	11	12	13	14	15	16	17	18	19	20	Pts	Pos	21
1	(England) (16) Jeremy Doncaster	14				3				2	3						3			3			14	1	
2	(England) (15) Kelvin Tatum	12				2			3			3						1	3				12	2	
3	(England) (5) Chris Morton	11		2			3					1					2					3	11	3	
4	(Australia) (4) Steve Baker	9	1							1				3				3				1	9	4	
5	(England) (13) Neil Evitts	9				1	1							1		3					3		9	5	
6	(England) (8) Richard Knight	9		3						0			2			2			2				9	6	
7	(New Zealand) (14) Larry Ross	8				0		0					3		3							2	8	7	
8	(Australia) (6) Phil Crump	8		1				3			X							2			2		8	8	
9	(England) (2) Marvyn Cox	8	3					1				2				1				1			8	9	
10	(England) (9) Paul Thorp	8			3		2						1					0		2			8	10	
11	(New Zealand) (1) Mitch Shirra	7	2				0				2				2				1				7	11	
12	(New Zealand) (12) David Bargh	6			1					3		F			1						1		6	12	
13	(England) (10) Phil Collins	5			2			2						0			1		0				5	13	
14	(England) (7) Malcolm Simmons	3		0					1					2	0					0			3	14	
15	(Australia) (11) Steve Regeling	3			0				2		1					E						0	3	15	
16	(Australia) (3) Allan Rivett	0	0						0				0				E				0		0	16	
Placing	Rider	Total	1	2	3	4	5	6	7	8	9	10	11	12	13	14	15	16	17	18	19	20	Pts	Pos	21

m - exclusion for exceeding two minute time allowance • t - exclusion for touching the tapes • x - other exclusion • e - retired or mechanical failure • f - fell • ns - non-starter • nc - non-classify

gate A - inside	gate B	gate C	gate D - outside

== See also ==
- Motorcycle Speedway
