= 1995 Speedway Grand Prix =

World motorcycle speedway event

Season details
- Dates: 20 May - 30 September
- Events: 6
- Cities: 6
- Countries: 6
- Riders: 17 permanents 1 wild card(s)
- Heats: 144 + 1 Run-off (in 6 events)

Winners
- Champion: DEN Hans Nielsen
- Runner-up: SWE Tony Rickardsson
- 3rd place: USA Sam Ermolenko ←1994 World Championship

The 1995 Speedway Grand Prix was the 50th edition of the official World Championship to determine the world champion rider.

It was the first season in the Speedway Grand Prix era used to determine the Speedway World Champion. The Grand Prix series was won by Hans Nielsen; it was his fourth World Champion title.

== Event format ==
For the new Speedway Grand Prix series it remained the case at each meeting that each rider raced every other once. However, the top 4 riders qualified for a final and the points for all other riders determined their finishing position in the meeting and therefore their championship Grand Prix points. The 4 finalists scored 20, 18, 17 and 16 points, with the remainder scoring 15, 14, 13, 12, 11, 10, 9, 8, 7, 6, 4, 3, 2, 1.

== Qualification for Grand Prix ==
The 1995 season had 17 permanent riders (2 as track reserve) and 1 wild card at each event. Each event also could feature 2 reserves who were available to compete and qualify for full points. The 17 riders selected for the 1995 Grand Prix were the top 10 from the 1994 World final, 5 seeded through who were (Sam Ermolenko, Chris Louis, Tomasz Gollob, Gary Havelock and Andy Smith) and 2 wildcards (Billy Hamill and Mikael Karlsson).

The permanent riders are highlighted in the results table below.

== 1995 Event Schedule and Winners ==
| Round | Date | City and venue | Winner | Runner-up | 3rd placed | 4th placed | Results |
|---|---|---|---|---|---|---|---|
| 1 | 20 May | (Poland) Wrocław , Poland; Olympic Stadium | (Poland) Tomasz Gollob | (Denmark) Hans Nielsen | (United Kingdom) Chris Louis | (United Kingdom) Mark Loram | results |
| 2 | 17 June | (Austria) Wiener Neustadt , Austria; Stadion Wiener Neustadt | (United States) Billy Hamill | (Sweden) Tony Rickardsson | (Denmark) Hans Nielsen | (United Kingdom) Mark Loram | results |
| 3 | 8 July | (Germany) Abensberg , Germany; Motorstadion | (Denmark) Tommy Knudsen | (Denmark) Hans Nielsen | (United States) Billy Hamill | (Germany) Gerd Riss | results |
| 4 | 12 August | (Sweden) Linköping , Sweden; Motorstadium | (Denmark) Tommy Knudsen | (Sweden) Tony Rickardsson | (United States) Greg Hancock | (Denmark) Hans Nielsen | results |
| 5 | 9 September | (Denmark) Vojens , Denmark; Speedway Center | (Denmark) Hans Nielsen | (United States) Sam Ermolenko | (Sweden) Tony Rickardsson | (Poland) Tomasz Gollob | results |
| 6 | 30 September | (United Kingdom) London , Great Britain; Hackney Wick Stadium | (United States) Greg Hancock | (United States) Sam Ermolenko | (United Kingdom) Mark Loram | (Sweden) Henka Gustafsson | results |

== Final standings ==
Qualifies for next season's Grand Prix series
Full-time Grand Prix rider
Wild card, track reserve or qualified reserve

| Pos. | Rider | Points | POL (Poland) | AUT (Austria) | GER (Germany) | SWE (Sweden) | DEN (Denmark) | GBR (United Kingdom) |
| Gold | (Denmark) (2) Hans Nielsen | 103 | 18 | 17 | 18 | 16 | 20 | 14 |
| Silver | (Sweden) (1) Tony Rickardsson | 88 | 15 | 18 | 12 | 18 | 17 | 8 |
| Bronze | (United States) (12) Sam Ermolenko | 83 | 14 | 11 | 10 | 12 | 18 | 18 |
| 4 | (United States) (4) Greg Hancock | 82 | 9 | 13 | 9 | 17 | 14 | 20 |
| 5 | (United States) (18) Billy Hamill | 80 | 4 | 20 | 17 | 11 | 13 | 15 |
| 6 | (United Kingdom) (8) Mark Loram | 77 | 16 | 16 | 8 | 9 | 11 | 17 |
| 7 | (United Kingdom) (11) Chris Louis | 77 | 17 | 10 | 13 | 15 | 15 | 7 |
| 8 | (Sweden) (7) Henrik Gustafsson | 73 (+3) | 12 | 15 | 15 | 8 | 7 | 16 |
| 9 | (Poland) (13) Tomasz Gollob | 73 (+2) | 20 | 12 | 6 | 10 | 16 | 9 |
| 10 | (Denmark) (5) Tommy Knudsen | 67 | 2 | 2 | 20 | 20 | 12 | 11 |
| 11 | (Australia) (3) Craig Boyce | 60 | 11 | 8 | 7 | 14 | 10 | 10 |
| 12 | (United Kingdom) (6) Marvyn Cox | 54 | 8 | 14 | 11 | 7 | 8 | 6 |
| 13 | (United Kingdom) (15) Gary Havelock | 45 | 13 | 7 | 4 | 6 | 2 | 13 |
| 14 | (United Kingdom) (14) Andy Smith | 38 | 6 | 9 | 14 | 3 | 3 | 3 |
| 15 | (Denmark) (10) Jan Stæchmann | 23 | 7 | 4 | 3 | 1 | 6 | 2 |
| 16 | (Sweden) (17) Mikael Karlsson | 17 | 3 | 3 | 2 | 4 | 1 | 4 |
| 17 | (Germany) (16) Gerd Riss | 16 | – | – | 16 | – | – | – |
| 18 | (Sweden) (16) (19) Peter Karlsson | 16 | 1 | 1 | 1 | 13 | – | – |
| 19 | (Australia) (16) Jason Crump | 12 | – | – | – | – | – | 12 |
| 20 | (Poland) (16) Dariusz Śledź | 10 | 10 | – | – | – | – | – |
| 21 | (Norway) (16) Lars Gunnestad | 9 | – | – | – | – | 9 | – |
| 22 | (United States) (9) Josh Larsen | 7 | – | – | – | 2 | 4 | 1 |
| 23 | (Austria) (16) Franz Leitner | 6 | – | 6 | – | – | – | – |
| Pos. | Rider | Points | POL (Poland) | AUT (Austria) | GER (Germany) | SWE (Sweden) | DEN (Denmark) | GBR (United Kingdom) |

== See also ==
- motorcycle speedway
