= Rempała =

Rempała is a Polish surname. Notable people with the surname include:

- Grzegorz Rempała (born 1968), Polish-American applied mathematician
- Jacek Rempała (born 1971), Polish speedway rider
- Marcin Rempała (born 1984), Polish speedway rider
