= 1993 Commonwealth final =

1993 Commonwealth Final

Seasons
- ← 1992 1994 →

The 1993 Commonwealth final was the tenth running of the Commonwealth Final as part of the qualification for the 1993 Speedway World Championship. The 1993 Final was run on 23 May at the Norfolk Arena in King's Lynn, England, and was part of the World Championship qualifying for riders from the Commonwealth nations.

Riders qualified for the Final from the Australian, British and New Zealand Championships.

The winner was Australian Leigh Adams and it was the first time that a rider from outside of Great Britain won the event.

== 1993 Commonwealth final ==
- 23 May
- (England) King's Lynn, Norfolk Arena
- Qualification: Top 11 plus 1 reserve to the Overseas Final in Coventry, England

Pos.	Rider	Total
1	(Australia) Leigh Adams	14
2	(England) Andy Smith	13
3	(England) Martin Dugard	11
4	(England) Joe Screen	10
5	(Australia) Jason Lyons	10
6	(England) Chris Louis	9
7	(England) Dave Mullett	9
8	(England) Gary Havelock	8
9	(England) David Norris	8
10	(New Zealand) Mitch Shirra*	6+3
11	(England) Richard Knight	6+2
12	(New Zealand) Mark Thorpe	6+1
13	(Australia) Craig Hodgson	5
14	(England) Martin Goodwin	4
15	(Australia) Shane Bowes	1
16	(England) Les Collins	0

* Mitch Shirra replaced Mark Lyndon

== See also ==
- Motorcycle Speedway
