= Austrian Grand Prix (disambiguation) =

Austrian Grand Prix can refer to:

- Austrian Grand Prix, a Formula One motor race
- Austrian motorcycle Grand Prix
- Speedway Grand Prix of Austria
- Styrian Grand Prix, Formula One race held in Styria, Austria
