= 1993 Speedway World Team Cup =

34th edition of the annual motorcycle speedway World Cup competition

Seasons
- ← 1992 1994 →

The 1993 Speedway World Team Cup was the 34th edition of the FIM Speedway World Team Cup to determine the team world champions.

The final was staged at the Brandon Stadium in Coventry, England. The United States won their fourth title.

== First round ==
- 2 May 1993
- (Slovenia) Matija Gubec Stadium, Krško

1st	2nd	3rd	4th	5th
Russia - 33; Mikhail Starostin (3,3,3,3,3) -15; Oleg Volokhov (1,3,2,3) - 9 Oleg Kurguskin (3,3,f,3) - 9	Latvia - 24; Nikolay Kokin (2,1,3,2,2) - 10; Vladimir Voronkov (-3,3,0) - 6 Andrey Korolyov (f/0,2,3,3) - 8	Slovenia - 17; Gerhard Lekse (-,2,2,1,2) - 7 Martin Peterca (1,2,1,2) - 6 Gregor Pintar (1,2,t,1) - 4	Ukraine - 15; Vladimir Trofimov (3,2,2,1,-) - 8 Igor Zverev (0,1,1,-) - 2 Aleksandr Lyatosinsky (1,1,1/1,1) - 5	France - 4 Stephane Tresarrieu (2,0,2,f,0) -4; Christian Cigana (f,0,0,0) - 0 Christophe Dubernard (f,e,-,-) -0

***Abandoned after heat 17 due to rain. Result stands after 16 heats

Russia to second round

== Second round ==
- 9 May
- (Austria) Stadion Wiener Neustadt, Wiener Neustadt

1st	2nd	3rd	4th
Germany - 38+3; Gerd Riss (3,3,3,3,2) - 14+3; Robert Barth (1,3,1,2,3) - 10; Andre Pollehn (0,f,-,-,-) - 0 Mike Ott (1,2,1,1,3) - 8 Roland Kolros (-,1,1,2,2) - 6	Russia - 38+2; Oleg Kurguskin (3,2,2,1,1) - 9 Rinat Mardanshin (3,1,2,1,3) 10; Mikhail Starostin (2,2,3,2,1) - 10+2; Oleg Volokhov (2,2,2,2,1) - 9	Italy - 33; Paolo Salvatelli (2,3,3,f,0) - 8 Armando Castagna (1,3,3,3,3) - 13; Armando Dal Chiele (3,1,0,0,0) - 4 Valentino Furlanetto (2,1,-,3,2) - 8 Massimo Mora (-,-,0,-,-) - 0	Austria - 11; Andreas Bössner (1,0,2,1,0) - 4 Rainer Selb (0,-,-,-,-) - 0 Toni Pilotto (0,0,0,0,1) - 1 Heinrich Schatzer (e,-,e,3,2) - 5 Helmut Lercher (-,0/0,1,0,0) - 1

Germany to third round after Gerd Riss beat Mikhail Starostin in a race-off for first place.

== Third round ==
- 27 June 1993
- (Poland) KS Apator Stadium, Toruń
- Att: 12 000

Placing	Team / Rider name	Total	1	2	3	4	5	6	7	8	9	10	11	12	13	14	15	16	Pts	17	18	19	20
1	Poland	46	2	5	7	10	13	15	17	20	22	24	25	28	30	33	34	37		40	43	43	46
1	(1) Tomasz Gollob	15				3				3				3				3	12				3
1	(2) Piotr Świst	5			2				2				-				1		5			E
1	(3) Piotr Baron	12		3				2				2			2				9	3
1	(4) Jacek Krzyżaniak	13	2				3				2					3			10		3
1	(17) Piotr Protasiewicz	1											1						1
2	Hungary	33	1	2	3	3	3	4	7	8	11	14	16	18	21	23	25	26		28	28	31	33
2	(13) Zoltán Adorján	10		1					3		3							1	8				2
2	(14) Zsolt Böszermenyi	9	1							1		3					2		7	2
2	(15) Antal Kocso	6			1			1						2		2			6		E
2	(16) Zoltan Hajdu	0				0	0						-		-				0			-
2	(20) József Petrikovics	8											2		3				5			3
4	Germany	29.5	3	5	5	7	8	11	11.5	11.5	12.5	13.5	16.5	17.5	18.5	18.5	21.5	23.5		24.5	26.5	28.5	29.5
4	(5) Gerd Riss	12	3					3					3					2	11	1
4	(6) Robert Barth	8		2			1							1			3		7				1
4	(7) Andre Pollehn	5.5				2			0.5			1				0			3.5			2
4	(8) Mike Ott	1			0					0	-				1				1		-
4	(18) Robbie Kessler	3									1								1		2
4	Norway	11.5	0	0	3	4	6	6	6.5	8.5	8.5	8.5	8.5	8.5	8.5	9.5	9.5	9.5		9.5	10.5	11.5	11.5
4	(9) Lars Gunnestad	5			3		2					E						0	5				0
4	(10) Rune Holta	0				F		-			-						-		0			-
4	(11) Einar Kyllingstad	3		0						2			0			1			3	0
4	(12) Bjorn A. Tönnesen	1.5	0						0.5					0	0				0.5		1
4	(19) John Pollestad	2				1		0			E						0		1			1
Placing	Team / Rider name	Total	1	2	3	4	5	6	7	8	9	10	11	12	13	14	15	16	Pts	17	18	19	20

M - exclusion for exceeding two-minute time allowance • T - exclusion for touching the tapes • X - other exclusion • E - retired or mechanical failure • F - fell

Helmet colours were permanent for each team (Red, Blue, White and Yellow/Black). Colours in diagrams indicate gate positions:
gate A – inside	gate B	gate C	gate D – outside

Poland to fourth round

== Fourth round ==
- 22 August 1993
- (Denmark) Slangerup Speedway Center, Slangerup

Placing	Team / Rider name	Total	1	2	3	4	5	6	7	8	9	10	11	12	13	14	15	16	Pts	17	18	19	20
1	Denmark	53	2	5	8	11	13	16	19	22	25	25	27	30	33	36	39	42		45	48	50	53
1	(1) Hans Nielsen	15				3				3				3				3	12				3
1	(2) Tommy Knudsen	13			3				3				2				3		11			2
1	(3) Brian Karger	12		3				3				0			3				9	3
1	(4) Brian Andersen	13	2				2				3					3			10		3
1	(17) Morten Andersen	0																	0
2	Australia	28	1	2	3	4	5	5	7	8	8	11	12	14	16	18	20	21		22	23	26	28
2	(13) Leigh Adams	5		1					2		0							1	4		1
2	(14) Jason Crump	9	1							1		3					2		7				2
2	(15) Jason Lyons	8			1			0						2		2			5			3
2	(16) Craig Boyce	3				1	1						1		-				3	-
2	(20) Glenn Doyle	3													2				2	1
4	Poland	27	3	5	7	9	12	13	14	16	17	19	19	19	20	21	21	23		23	25	26	27
4	(9) Tomasz Gollob	10			2		3					2						2	9				1
4	(10) Dariusz Śledź	4				2		1			1						0		4	E
4	(11) Jacek Krzyżaniak	7		2						2			0			1			5		2
4	(12) Piotr Baron	6	3						1					0	1				5			1
4	(19) Piotr Protasiewicz	0																	0
4	Czech Republic	12	0	0	0	0	0	2	2	2	4	5	8	9	9	9	10	10		12	12	12	12
4	(5) Bohumil Brhel	5	X					2					3					0	5				0
4	(6) Tomáš Topinka	1		0			0							1			-		1			-
4	(7) Antonín Kasper Jr.	1				0			-			1				0			1		0
4	(8) Antonín Šváb Jr.	2			0					0	-				0				0	2
4	(18) Petr Vandírek	3							0		2						1		3			0
Placing	Team / Rider name	Total	1	2	3	4	5	6	7	8	9	10	11	12	13	14	15	16	Pts	17	18	19	20

M - exclusion for exceeding two-minute time allowance • T - exclusion for touching the tapes • X - other exclusion • E - retired or mechanical failure • F - fell

Helmet colours were permanent for each team (Red, Blue, White and Yellow/Black). Colours in diagrams indicate gate positions:
gate A – inside	gate B	gate C	gate D – outside

Denmark to World final.

== World final ==
- 19 September 1993
- (England) Brandon Stadium, Coventry

Placing	Team / Rider name	Total	1	2	3	4	5	6	7	8	9	10	11	12	13	14	15	16	Pts	17	18	19	20
1	United States	40	1	3	3	5	6	9	12	14	16	18	21	21	24	26	28	31		34	36	37	40
1	(5) Sam Ermolenko	13	1					3					3					3	10				3
1	(6) Bobby Ott	3		2			1							0			-		3	-
1	(7) Billy Hamill	10				2			3			2				2			9			1
1	(8) Greg Hancock	9			0					2	2				3				7		2
1	(18) Josh Larsen	5															2		2	3
2	Denmark	38	3	6	9	12	14	16	16	19	20	23	25	26	27	30	33	34		34	34	37	38
2	(13) Brian Karger	5		3					0		1							1	5	0
2	(14) Hans Nielsen	13	3							3		3					3		12				1
2	(15) Tommy Knudsen	12			3			2						1		3			9			3
2	(16) John Jørgensen	8				3	2						2		1				8		0
2	(20) Brian Andersen	0																	0
4	Sweden	28	0	0	2	2	5	6	8	9	12	13	14	17	19	20	21	23		25	26	26	28
4	(1) Per Jonsson	6				0				1				3				2	6			0
4	(2) Peter Karlsson	7			2				2				1				1		6		1
4	(3) Henrik Gustafsson	6		0				1				1			2				4	2
4	(4) Tony Rickardsson	9	0				3				3					1			7				2
4	(17) Peter Nahlin	0																	0
4	England	14	2	3	4	5	5	5	6	6	6	6	6	8	8	8	8	8		9	12	14	14
4	(9) Kelvin Tatum	2			1		0					-						0	1	1
4	(10) Gary Havelock	4				1		0			-						0		1		3
4	(11) Martin Dugard	1		1						0			0			-			1			-
4	(12) Joe Screen	5	2						1					2	0				5				E
4	(19) Chris Louis	2									0	0				0			0			2
Placing	Team / Rider name	Total	1	2	3	4	5	6	7	8	9	10	11	12	13	14	15	16	Pts	17	18	19	20

M - exclusion for exceeding two-minute time allowance • T - exclusion for touching the tapes • X - other exclusion • E - retired or mechanical failure • F - fell

Helmet colours were permanent for each team (Red, Blue, White and Yellow/Black). Colours in diagrams indicate gate positions:
gate A – inside	gate B	gate C	gate D – outside

== See also ==
- 1993 Individual Speedway World Championship
- 1993 Speedway World Pairs Championship
