= 1991 Commonwealth final =

1991 Commonwealth Final

Seasons
- ← 1990 1992 →

The 1990 Commonwealth final was the eighth running of the Commonwealth Final as part of the qualification for the 1991 Speedway World Championship. The 1991 Final was run on 10 June at the Norfolk Arena in King's Lynn, England, and was part of the World Championship qualifying for riders from the Commonwealth nations.

Riders qualified for the Final from the Australian, British and New Zealand Championships.

== 1991 Commonwealth final ==
- 10 June
- (England) King's Lynn, Norfolk Arena
- Qualification: Top 11 plus 1 reserve to the 1991 Overseas Final in Bradford, England

| Pos. | Rider | Total |
|---|---|---|
| 1 | (England) Jeremy Doncaster | 14 |
| 2 | (Australia) Leigh Adams | 10+3 |
| 3 | (England) Joe Screen | 10+2 |
| 4 | (England) Paul Thorp | 10+1 |
| 5 | (England) Kelvin Tatum | 9 |
| 6 | (Australia) Glenn Doyle | 9 |
| 7 | (England) Neil Collins | 8 |
| 8 | (England) Gary Havelock | 8 |
| 9 | (Australia) Todd Wiltshire* | 7 |
| 10 | (England) Andy Smith | 7 |
| 11 | (New Zealand) Mitch Shirra | 7 |
| 12 | (England) Chris Louis | 6 |
| 13 | (England) Sean Wilson | 5 |
| 14 | (New Zealand) Gary Allan | 4 |
| 15 | (England) Martin Dugard | 4 |
| 16 | (Australia) Craig Boyce | 1 |

* Todd Wiltshire replaced Glyn Taylor

== See also ==
- Motorcycle Speedway
