= 1994 Individual Speedway World Championship =

Motorcycle speedway world championship season

Seasons
- ← 1993 1995 →

The 1994 Speedway World Final programme.

The 1994 Individual Speedway World Championship was the 49th edition of the official World Championship to determine the world champion rider.

It was the last championship to be staged in the traditional single meeting World Final format before the advent of the Speedway Grand Prix series in 1995. The Final was held on 20 August at the Speedway Center in Vojens, Denmark.

Sweden's Tony Rickardsson won the first of what would prove to be a record equalling 6 World Championships, defeating Danish former triple champion Hans Nielsen and Australia's Craig Boyce in a runoff after all three riders finished on 12 points.

== First round ==
=== British qualifiers ===
- Top 32 to British-Semi finals

== Second round ==
=== British semi-finals ===
- Top 16 to British final

=== Australian qualification ===
Date	Championship	Venue	Winner	2nd	3rd
Dec '93	Queensland	Brisbane Exhibition Ground	Troy Butler	Jason Crump	Tony Rose
27 Dec '93	New South Wales	Gosford Showground, Gosford	Craig Boyce	Stephen Davies	Tony Primmer
Dec '93	Victorian	Olympic Park, Mildura	Leigh Adams	Mark Lemon	Jason Lyons
Dec '93	South Australian	North Arm Speedway, Gillman	Shane Parker	Brett Woodifield	Steve Graetz
Dec '93	Western Australian	Claremont Speedway, Perth	Steve Johnston	?	?

=== New Zealand qualification ===
Date	Championship	Venue	Winner	2nd	3rd
??	South Island	Ruapuna Speedway, Christchurch	Mark Thorpe	Mark Jamiesson	Trevor Chapman
?	North Island	Stratford Speedway, Stratford	Nathan Murray	Mike Wilson	Tony Nagel

== Third round ==
=== Swedish qualification ===
- Top 8 in each heat to Swedish final

(8 May, Nyköpings Motorstadion, Nyköping)
Pos	Rider	Points
1	Erik Stenlund	12
2	Niklas Klingberg	12
3	Tony Rickardsson	11
4	Conny Ivarsson	11
5	Peter Nahlin	11
6	Tony Olsson	9
7	Jimmy Nilsen	9
8	Patrik Olsson	9
9	Robert Eriksson	7
10	Mikael Ritterwall	7
11	Peter Karlsson	6
12	Stefan Ekberg	6
13	Jörgen Hultgren	4
14	Dennis Löfqvist	3
15	Magnus Zetterström (res)	3
16	John Jensen	0
17	Patrik Karlsson	0

(8 May, Målilla Motorstadion, Målilla)
Pos	Rider	Points
1	Per Jonsson	15
2	Henrik Gustafsson	13
3	Christer Rohlén	10
4	Mikael Karlsson	10
5	Stefan Dannö	10
6	Claes Ivarsson	9
7	Niklas Karlsson	9
8	Jörgen Johansson	8
9	Stefan Andersson	8
10	Joakim Karlsson	7
11	Anders Kling	6
12	Jonathan Forsgren	5
13	Jimmy Engman	4
14	Mikael Olsson	3
15	Raymond Smedh	3
16	Kenneth Lindby	0

=== Continental Preliminary round ===
- Top 32 to Continental semi-finals

Date	Venue	Winner	2nd	3rd
24 April	(Slovenia) Matija Gubec Stadium, Krško	(Hungary) Sándor Tihanyi	(Italy) Andrea Maida	(Hungary) Gabor Roth
24 April	(Italy) Santa Marina Stadium, Lonigo	(Russia) Rinat Mardanshin	(Czech Republic) Zdeněk Schneiderwind	(Germany) Robert Barth
24 April	(Germany) Pfaffenhofen Speedway, Pfaffenhofen	(Germany) Simon Wigg	(Latvia) Vladimir Voronkov	(Czech Republic) George Štancl
24 April	(Poland) Stadion Polonii Piła, Piła	(Russia) Grigory Kharchenko	(Poland) Adam Pawliczek	(Latvia) Andrey Korolev

=== British Final ===
- Top 10 to Commonwealth final plus 1 reserve

=== Australian Final ===
- First 4 to Commonwealth Final plus 1 reserve

=== New Zealand Final ===
- 5 February 1994
- (New Zealand) Stratford Speedway, Stratford
- Top 1 (+ Mitch Shirra seeded) to Commonwealth Final

Pos.	Rider	Total
1	Mark Thorpe	15
2	Tony Nagel	14
3	Mark Jamieson	13
4	Steve Mudgway	11
5	Nathan Murray	9
6	Mike Wilson	8
7	Galvin Stone	8
8	Craig Barker	8
9	Trevor Chapman	6
10	Justin Monk	6
11	Dean Cooper	5
12	Rhys Hamburger	4
13	Jacqui Mauger	4
14	Chris Penny	4
15	Scott Mitchell	2
16	Daniel Burberry	1

== Fourth round ==
=== Continental Quarter-finals ===
- Top 32 to Continental semi-finals

Date	Venue	Winner	2nd	3rd
8 May	(France) Marmande Speedway, Marmande	(Poland) Grzegorz Rempala	(Czech Republic) Roman Matoušek	(Italy) Massimo Mora
8 May	(Germany) Rhein-Main Arena, Diedenbergen	(Poland) Roman Jankowski	(Italy) Armando Castagna	(Czech Republic) Antonín Kasper, Jr.
8 May	(Germany) Anton Treffer Stadion, Neustadt	(Germany) Marvyn Cox	(Czech Republic) Marián Jirout	(Hungary) Róbert Nagy
8 May	(Poland) Stadion Polonii Piła, Piła	(Poland) Piotr Świst	(Poland) Jacek Rempala	(Germany) Simon Wigg

=== Danish Final ===
- (Denmark) - 2 rounds, top 6 to Nordic Final plus 1 reserve
- R1 (28 May, Skave Speedway, Holstebro)
- R2 (29 May, Fladbro Speedway, Randers)

Pos.	Rider	Scores	Total
1	Hans Nielsen		24
2	Claus Jacobsen		22
3	Gert Handberg		21
4	Jan Staechmann		20
5	Tommy Knudsen		20
6	Martin Vinther		18
7	John Jørgensen		17
8	Jacob Olsen		16
9	Brian Karger		16
10	Brian Andersen		13
11	Frede Schött		13
12	Ole Hansen		11
13	Jan Andersen		8
Res	Ronni Pedersen		7
14	Morten Andersen		6
Res	Soren Damgärd		6
15	Bo Skov Eriksen		1
16	Kjed Mikkelsen		0

=== Finland Final ===
- (Finland) Kaanaa Speedway, Tampere
- 22 Aug '93, top 1 (+2 nominations) to Nordic final

Pos.	Rider	Total
1	Mika Pellinen	15
2	Petri Nurmesniemi	14
3	Kai Laukkanen	11
4	Jarno Kosonen	11
5	Vesa Ylinen	10
6	Janne Koivula	9
7	Marko Hyyrylãinen	8
8	Juha Moksunen	8
9	Sam Myllymäki	6
10	Petri Vaatsio	6
11	Marko Laine	6
12	Mika Laukkanen	5
13	Marko Junisko (res)	4
14	Tomi Havu	3
15	Jarmo Mäkinen	3
16	Tomi Kalliomäki	1
17	Roy Malmineheimo	0

=== Norwegian Final ===
- (Norway) Geiteryggen Speedwaybane, Skien
- 8 May, top 2 to Nordic final

Pos.	Rider	Total
1	Lars Gunnestad	14+3
2	Rune Holta	14+2
3	Arnt Forland	13
4	Björn Arild Tönnesen	11
5	Einar Kyllingstad	10
6	Ignar Hvamstad	10
7	John Pollestad	9
8	Robert Langeland	8
9	Arvid Ardal	7
10	Kjell Roine Heia	5
11	Kjell Öyvind Sola	5
12	Willy Tjessem	4
13	Jörn Arve Aardal	3
14	Eivind Reppen	3
15	Trygve Jensen	2
16	Pal Christiansen Hasselgren	2

=== Swedish Final ===
- 24 May 1994
- (Sweden) Kumla Motorstadion, Kumla
- First 5 to Nordic Final plus 1 reserve

Placing	Rider	Total	1	2	3	4	5	6	7	8	9	10	11	12	13	14	15	16	17	18	19	20	Pts	Pos	21
1	(Sweden) (2) Henrik Gustafsson	13	1					3				3				3				3			13	1	
2	(Sweden) (5) Per Jonsson	13		3			3					2					3					2	13	2	
3	(Sweden) (13) Tony Rickardsson	12				3	2							2		2					3		12	3	
4	(Sweden) (15) Stefan Danno	10				2			3			0						3	2				10	4	
5	(Sweden) (3) Jimmy Nilsen	10	2						1				3				2				2		10	5	
6	(Sweden) (11) Niklas Klingberg	9			2				2		1					1						3	9	6	3
7	(Sweden) (1) Mikael Karlsson	9	3				1				0				2				3				9	7	2
8	(Sweden) (7) Erik Stenlund	9		1					0					3	3					2			9	8	1
9	(Sweden) (12) Tony Olsson	7			1					3		1			1						1		7	9	
10	(Sweden) (10) Peter Nahlin	6			3			1						1			1		0				6	10	
11	(Sweden) (14) Jorgen Johansson	6				1		2					2		0							1	6	11	
12	(Sweden) (16) Christer Rohlen	5				0				1	3						0			1			5	12	
13	(Sweden) (4) Claes Ivarsson	4	0							2				0				2				E	4	13	
14	(Sweden) (8) Conny Ivarsson	4		2						F			1			0			1				4	14	
15	(Sweden) (6) Niklas Karlsson	3		0				0			2							1			0		3	15	
16	(Sweden) (9) Patrick Olsson	0			0		0						-					-		-			0	16	
R1	(Sweden) (R1) Robert Eriksson	0											0					0		0			0	R1	
R2	(Sweden) (R2) Anders Kling	0																					0	R2	
Placing	Rider	Total	1	2	3	4	5	6	7	8	9	10	11	12	13	14	15	16	17	18	19	20	Pts	Pos	21

m - exclusion for exceeding two minute time allowance • t - exclusion for touching the tapes • x - other exclusion • e - retired or mechanical failure • f - fell • ns - non-starter • nc - non-classify

gate A - inside	gate B	gate C	gate D - outside

=== Commonwealth Final ===
- First 10 to Overseas Final plus 1 reserve

=== American Final ===
- 22 May 1994
- (United States) Ventura Raceway, Ventura
- First 5 to Overseas Final plus 1 reserve
- Sam Ermolenko seeded to Overseas Final

Placing	Rider	Total	1	2	3	4	5	6	7	8	9	10	11	12	13	14	15	16	17	18	19	20	Pts	Pos	21	22
1	(United States) (15) Greg Hancock	15				3			3			3						3	3				15	1		
2	(United States) (13) Billy Hamill	13				2	2							3		3					3		13	2		3
3	(United States) (9) Josh Larsen	13			3		3						3					2		2			13	3		2
4	(United States) (11) Mike Faria	11			2				2		2					2						3	11	4	3	
5	(United States) (2) Charles Ermolenko	11	3					2				2				1				3			11	5	2	
6	(United States) (6) Chris Manchester	10		3				3			3							1			F		10	6		
7	(United States) (7) Charlie Venegas	8		2					1					2	3					F			8	7		
8	(United States) (1) Bobby Schwartz	7	2				1				1				1				2				7	8		
9	(United States) (5) Jim Sisemore	6		1			0					1					2					2	6	9		
10	(United States) (14) Ed Castro	6				1		1					2		2							0	6	10		
11	(United States) (16) Brent Werner	5				0				3	0						1			1			5	11		
12	(United States) (3) John Aden	5	1						0				1				3				E		5	12		
13	(United States) (4) Bobby Hedden	4	0							2				1				0				1	4	13		
14	(United States) (12) Andy Northrup	2			1					0		0			0						1		2	14		
15	(United States) (8) Josh Kehoe	2		T						1			T			0			1				2	15		
16	(United States) (10) Brad Oxley	0			0			T						0			0		0				0	16		
R1	(United States) (R1) Jeam Eastes	0		0				F															0	R1		
Placing	Rider	Total	1	2	3	4	5	6	7	8	9	10	11	12	13	14	15	16	17	18	19	20	Pts	Pos	21	22

m - exclusion for exceeding two minute time allowance • t - exclusion for touching the tapes • x - other exclusion • e - retired or mechanical failure • f - fell • ns - non-starter • nc - non-classify

gate A - inside	gate B	gate C	gate D - outside

== Fifth round ==
=== Continental semi-finals ===
- 12 June
- (Poland) Polonia Bydgoszcz Stadium, Bydgoszcz
- Top 7 to World semi-final

Pos.	Rider	Points
1	(Poland) Tomasz Gollob	15
2	(Germany) Marvyn Cox	13+3
3	(Poland) Jacek Gollob	13+2
4	(Czech Republic) Bohumil Brhel	10
5	(Hungary) Róbert Nagy	10
6	(Poland) Dariusz Sledz	9
7	(Czech Republic) Tomáš Topinka	9
8	(Czech Republic) Roman Matoušek	8
9	(Hungary) Laszlo Bodi	7
10	(Italy) Massimo Mora	6
11	(Czech Republic) Marian Jirout	6
12	(Italy) Andrea Maida	4
13	(Russia) Rinat Mardanschin	3
14	(Poland) Grzegorz Rempala	3
15	(Hungary) József Petrikovics	3
16	(Poland) Marek Hucko (res)	1
17	(Austria) Franz Leitner	0
18	(Hungary) Sandor Tihanyi (res)	0

- 12 June
- (Hungary) Borsod Volán Stadion, Miskolc
- Top 7 to World semi-final

Pos.	Rider	Points
1	(Czech Republic) Antonín Kasper Jr.	12+3
2	(Italy) Armando Castagna	12+2
3	(Poland) Roman Jankowski	11+3
4	(Poland) Piotr Swist	11+2
5	(Hungary) Zoltán Adorján	10
6	(Poland) Ryszard Franczyszyn	10
7	(Germany) Simon Wigg	10
8	(Russia) Grigorij Charchenko	8
9	(Czech Republic) Petr Vandírek	7
10	(Hungary) Zoltan Hajdu	6
11	(Poland) Jacek Rempala	6
12	(Russia) Michail Starostin	6
13	(Russia) Oleg Kurguskin	5
14	(Czech Republic) Jiří Štancl	5
15	(Czech Republic) Václav Milík Sr.	1
16	(Austria) Walter Nebel	0

=== Overseas Final ===
- First 9 plus 1 reserve to World Semi-final

=== Nordic Final ===
- 12 June 1994
- (Sweden) Snälltorpet, Eskilstuna
- First 9 to World Semi-final plus 1 reserve

Placing	Rider	Total	1	2	3	4	5	6	7	8	9	10	11	12	13	14	15	16	17	18	19	20	Pts	Pos	21
1	(Denmark) (3) Hans Nielsen	13	2						3				2				3				3		13	1	
2	(Denmark) (9) Tommy Knudsen	12			3		0						3					3		3			12	2	3
3	(Sweden) (5) Tony Rickardsson	12		1			3					3					2					3	12	3	2
4	(Sweden) (1) Henrik Gustafsson	10	0				2				3				2				3				10	4	
5	(Sweden) (2) Per Jonsson	10	1					3				1				3				2			10	5	
6	(Norway) (4) Lars Gunnestad	10	3							3				2				1				1	10	6	
7	(Sweden) (7) Stefan Danno	8		0					2					3	3					0			8	7	
8	(Denmark) (6) Gert Handberg	8		3				1										2			2		8	8	
9	(Denmark) (16) Jan Staechmann	8				2				2	2						1			1			8	9	
10	(Denmark) (8) Claus Jacobsen	7		2						1			1			1			2				7	10	
11	(Sweden) (15) Jimmy Nilsen	5				3			X			2						0	X				5	11	
12	(Finland) (14) Vesa Ylinen	5				1		2					0		0							2	5	12	
13	(Norway) (11) Rune Holta	4			T				1		1					2						F	4	13	
14	(Finland) (13) Mika Pellinen	4				2	1							1		0					0		4	14	
15	(Finland) (12) Marko Huyyrylainen	3			1					0		0			1						1		3	15	
16	(Denmark) (10) Martin Vinther	1			0			0						0			0		1				1	16	
R1	(Sweden) (R1) Magnus Zetterstrom	0																					0	R1	
Placing	Rider	Total	1	2	3	4	5	6	7	8	9	10	11	12	13	14	15	16	17	18	19	20	Pts	Pos	21

m - exclusion for exceeding two minute time allowance • t - exclusion for touching the tapes • x - other exclusion • e - retired or mechanical failure • f - fell • ns - non-starter • nc - non-classify

gate A - inside	gate B	gate C	gate D - outside

== Sixth round ==
=== World Semi-Final 1 ===
- (England) Odsal Stadium, Bradford
- 10 July 1994, top 8 to World final plus 1 reserve

Placing	Rider	Total	1	2	3	4	5	6	7	8	9	10	11	12	13	14	15	16	17	18	19	20	Pts	Pos	21	22
1	(England) (9) Mark Loram	14			2		3						3					3		3			14	1		
2	(Denmark) (2) Hans Nielsen	13	3					3				3				3				1			13	2		
3	(Sweden) (11) Henrik Gustafsson	12			3				2		3					1						3	12	3		
4	(United States) (6) Josh Larsen	11		3				2			1							2			3		11	4		
5	(England) (4) Marvyn Cox	11	2							3				3				1				2	11	5		
6	(England) (5) Chris Louis	9		2			2					2					2					1	9	6		
7	(Poland) (16) Piotr Świst	8				1				2	0						3			2			8	7		
8	(Australia) (1) Craig Boyce	8	1				1				2				2				2				8	8		
9	(Poland) (15) Roman Jankowski	7				3			3			1						0	0				7	9		
10	(Denmark) (10) Claus Jacobsen	6			1			1						1			0		3				6	10		
11	(Czech Republic) (3) Bohumil Brhel	6	0						1				2				1				2		6	11		
12	(Norway) (8) Lars Gunnestad	6		1						1			1			2			1				6	12		
13	(Poland) (12) Jacek Gollob	4			0					0		0			3						1		4	13		
14	(Italy) (14) Armando Castagna	3				2		0					0		1							0	3	14		
15	(Australia) (13) Leigh Adams	2				0	0							2		0					-		2	15		
16	(Hungary) (7) Robert Nagy	0		0					0					0	-					-			0	16		
R1	(England) (R1) Joe Screen	0																					0	R1		
R2	(Czech Republic) (R2) Roman Matoušek	0																					0	R2		
Placing	Rider	Total	1	2	3	4	5	6	7	8	9	10	11	12	13	14	15	16	17	18	19	20	Pts	Pos	21	22

m - exclusion for exceeding two minute time allowance • t - exclusion for touching the tapes • x - other exclusion • e - retired or mechanical failure • f - fell • ns - non-starter • nc - non-classify

gate A - inside	gate B	gate C	gate D - outside

=== World Semi-final 2 ===
- (Czech Republic) Markéta Stadium, Prague
- 10 July 1994, top 8 to World Final plus 1 reserve

Placing	Rider	Total	1	2	3	4	5	6	7	8	9	10	11	12	13	14	15	16	17	18	19	20	Pts	Pos	21	22
1	(Poland) (5) Tomasz Gollob	14		3			3					3					3					2	14	1		
2	(Sweden) (8) Tony Rickardsson	12		1						3			3			3			2				12	2		
3	(Denmark) (16) Jan Staechmann	11				2				2	3						2			2			11	3		3
4	(United States) (7) Sam Ermolenko	11		2					1					2	3					3			11	4		2
5	(Sweden) (11) Stefan Danno	11			3				3		1					1						3	11	5		1
6	(Denmark) (15) Tommy Knudsen	11				3			2			2						1	3				11	6		0
7	(Australia) (1) Jason Crump	9	3				2				2				1				1				9	7		
8	(United States) (12) Greg Hancock	8			2					0		1			2						3		8	8	3	
9	(United States) (13) Billy Hamill	8				1	T							3		2					2		8	9	2	
10	(Czech Republic) (4) Tomáš Topinka	8	2							1				1				3				1	8	10		
11	(Hungary) (14) Zoltán Adorján	5				0		3					2		0							X	5	11		
12	(Poland) (9) Ryszard Franczyszyn	5			0		1						1					2		1			5	12		
13	(Poland) (2) Dariusz Sledz	2	0					2				0				0				0			2	13		
14	(England) (6) Simon Wigg	2		0				1			0							0			1		2	14		
15	(Denmark) (3) Gert Handberg	2	1						0				0				1				0		2	15		
16	(Czech Republic) (10) Antonín Kasper, Jr.	1			1			E						E			-		-				1	16		
R1	(Russia) (R1) Grigory Kharchenko	0															0		0				0	R1		
R2	(Czech Republic) (R2) Petr Vandírek	0					F																0	R2		
Placing	Rider	Total	1	2	3	4	5	6	7	8	9	10	11	12	13	14	15	16	17	18	19	20	Pts	Pos	21	22

m - exclusion for exceeding two minute time allowance • t - exclusion for touching the tapes • x - other exclusion • e - retired or mechanical failure • f - fell • ns - non-starter • nc - non-classify

gate A - inside	gate B	gate C	gate D - outside

== World Final ==
- 20 August 1994
- (Denmark) Vojens Speedway Center, Vojens

Placing	Rider	Total	1	2	3	4	5	6	7	8	9	10	11	12	13	14	15	16	17	18	19	20	Pts	Pos	21
1	(Sweden) (6) Tony Rickardsson	12		2				2			2							3			3		12	1	3
2	(Denmark) (11) Hans Nielsen	12			3				3		3					X						3	12	2	2
3	(Australia) (13) Craig Boyce	12				2	2							3		3					2		12	3	1
4	(United States) (12) Greg Hancock	11			1					3		3			3						1		11	4	
5	(Denmark) (1) Tommy Knudsen	10	3				3				1				0				3				10	5	
6	(England) (14) Marvyn Cox	9				3		0					3		2							1	9	6	
7	(Sweden) (10) Henrik Gustafsson	9			2			3						2			1		1				9	7	
8	(England) (8) Mark Loram	9		1						2			2			2			2				9	8	
9	(United States) (2) Josh Larsen	7	2					1				0				1				3			7	9	
10	(Denmark) (15) Jan Stæchmann	7				1			2			2						2	0				7	10	
11	(Australia) (7) Jason Crump	6		3					0					0	1					2			6	11	
12	(England) (3) Chris Louis	6	1						1				1				3				0		6	12	
13	(United States) (5) Sam Ermolenko	6		0			1					1					2					2	6	13	
14	(Sweden) (4) Stefan Dannö	2	0							1				1				0				0	2	14	
15	(Poland) (16) Piotr Świst	1				0				0	0						0			1			1	15	
16	(Poland) (9) Tomasz Gollob	0			0		0						-					-		-			0	16	
R1	(United States) (R1) Billy Hamill	0																1					0	R1	
R2	(Poland) (R2) Roman Jankowski	0											0							0			0	R2	
Placing	Rider	Total	1	2	3	4	5	6	7	8	9	10	11	12	13	14	15	16	17	18	19	20	Pts	Pos	21

m - exclusion for exceeding two minute time allowance • t - exclusion for touching the tapes • x - other exclusion • e - retired or mechanical failure • f - fell • ns - non-starter • nc - non-classify

gate A - inside	gate B	gate C	gate D - outside
