= Leif Wahlman =

Swedish motorcycle speedway rider

- Born: 17 July 1965; Norrköping, Sweden
- Died: 28 July 1984 (aged 19); King's Lynn, England
- Nationality: Swedish

Career history

Sweden
- 1981–1984: Vargarna

Great Britain
- 1984: Poole Pirates
- 1984: Exeter Falcons

Individual honours
- 1983: Swedish U21 Championship silver
- 1982: Swedish U21 Championship bronze

Team honours
- 1981: Allsvenskan Div 2 (South) Champion
- 1983: Allsvenskan Div 1 (South) Champion

Leif Wahlman (17 July 1965 – 28 July 1984) was a motorcycle speedway rider from Sweden. He earned two international caps for the Sweden national speedway team.

== Biography ==
Wahlman, born in Norrköping, came to prominence in speedway after securing two medals at the Swedish Junior Speedway Championship. He won a bronze medal in 1982 and followed this with a silver the following year in 1983.

Wahlman was riding for Vargarna in Sweden at the time and entering his fourth season he signed for Vargarna again and was coveted by the British teams. He secured his first British leagues contract after agreeing a deal with Poole Pirates (despite initially being refused a work permit) and started riding during the 1984 British League season. His time at Poole was not a happy one, as he averaged only 3.54, which led to his release. However, he was quickly signed up by Exeter Falcons and he began to find form.

Wahlman qualified for the final of the 1984 Individual Speedway Junior European Championship and was performing well, winning his third race. As he started his fourth race in heat 13, his engine seized, causing him to fall to the ground and then he was hit from behind. The 19-year-old Swede suffered catastrophic brain injuries and died later at the Queen Elizabeth Hospital in King's Lynn.

Many had predicted that he could have been a major star of the future.

== See also ==
Rider deaths in motorcycle speedway
