= 1984 Individual Speedway Junior European Championship =

European motorcycle speedway event

European Under-21 Championship
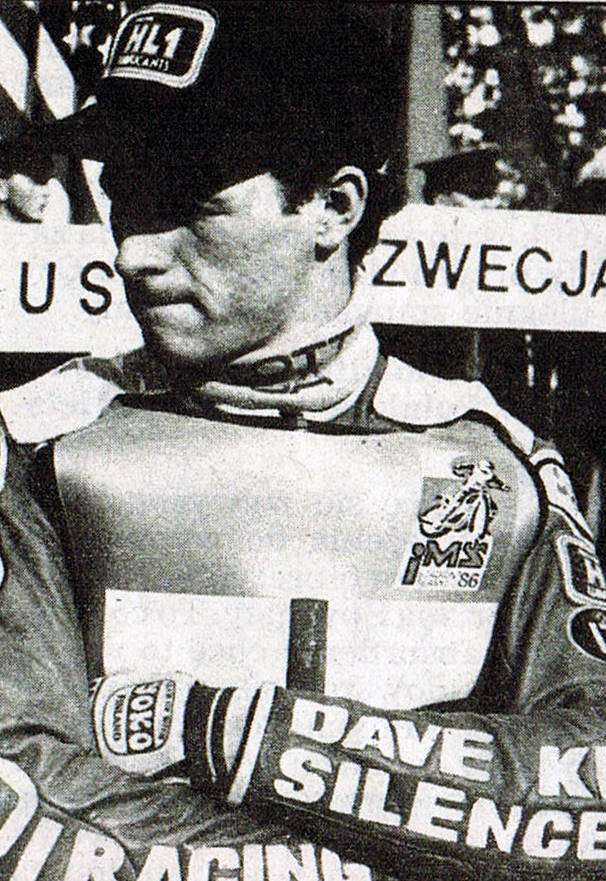
- Marvyn Cox won the marred 1984 Championship
- Venue: Norfolk Arena
- Location: King's Lynn, England
- Start date: 28 July 1984

The 1984 Individual Speedway Junior European Championship was the eighth edition of the European motorcycle speedway Under-21 Championships. All participants under the age of 21.

The title was won by Marvyn Cox but the meeting was blighted by the death of Leif Wahlman. During heat 13 his engine seized, causing him to fall and then he was hit from behind. The 19-year-old Swede suffered catastrophic brain injuries and died later at the Queen Elizabeth Hospital in King's Lynn.

== European final ==
- 28 July 1984
- (England) Norfolk Arena, King's Lynn,

Placing	Rider	Total	1	2	3	4	5	6	7	8	9	10	11	12	13	14	15	16	17	18	19	20	Pts	Pos	21
1	(England) (5) Marvyn Cox	12		3			3					2					3					1	12	1	
2	(England) (9) Neil Evitts	11			2		2						3					2		2			11	2	3
3	(United States) (16) Steve Lucero	11				2				3	2						1			3			11	3	2
4	(Sweden) (11) Hans Wahlstrom	11			3				3		F					3						2	11	4	1
5	(Hungary) (4) József Petrikovics	10	3							1				3				0				3	10	5	
6	(England) (12) Andy Smith	10			0					2		3			2						3		10	6	
7	(Denmark) (14) Frank Andersen	10				3		2					2		3							X	10	7	
8	(Italy) (10) Armando Castagna	8			1			0						2			2		3				8	8	
9	(Denmark) (6) Lars Andersson	8		1				3			1							1			2		8	9	
10	(Soviet Union) (2) Oleg Volokhov	6	2					1				0				2				1			6	10	
11	(Sweden) (1) Leif Wahlman	5	1				1				3				X				-				5	11	
12	(Italy) (15) Giorgio Zaramella	5				1			0			1						3	0				5	12	
13	(Italy) (7) Valentino Furlanetto	4		2					2					0	F					0			4	13	
14	(Denmark) (8) Flemming Rasmussen	4		0						0			1			1			2				4	14	
15	(Poland) (13) Wojciech Załuski	2				0	0							1		0					1		2	15	
16	(West Germany) (3) Klaus Lausch	1	X						1				-				-				-		1	16	
R1	(Denmark) (R1) Kurt Hansen	1											0						1				1	R1	
R2	(Czechoslovakia) (R2) Jiri Broz	0															0				0		0	R2	
Placing	Rider	Total	1	2	3	4	5	6	7	8	9	10	11	12	13	14	15	16	17	18	19	20	Pts	Pos	21

m - exclusion for exceeding two minute time allowance • t - exclusion for touching the tapes • x - other exclusion • e - retired or mechanical failure • f - fell • ns - non-starter • nc - non-classify

gate A - inside	gate B	gate C	gate D - outside

== See also ==
Rider deaths in motorcycle speedway
