= 1989 Commonwealth final =

1989 Commonwealth Final

Seasons
- ← 1988 1990 →

The 1989 Commonwealth final was the sixth running of the Commonwealth Final as part of the qualification for the 1989 Speedway World Championship. The 1989 Final was run on 4 June at the Belle Vue Stadium in Manchester, England, and was part of the World Championship qualifying for riders from the Commonwealth nations.

Riders qualified for the Final from the Australian, British and New Zealand Championships.

== 1989 Commonwealth final ==
- 4 June
- (England) Manchester, Belle Vue Stadium
- Qualification: Top 12 plus 1 reserve to the Overseas Final in Coventry, England

Pos.	Rider	Total
1	(England) Simon Wigg	13
2	(New Zealand) Mitch Shirra*	12+3
3	(England) Neil Collins	12+2
4	(England) Andy Grahame	9
5	(England) Kelvin Tatum	9
6	(England) Andy Smith	9
7	(England) Jeremy Doncaster	8
8	(Australia) Troy Butler*	7
9	(England) Andy Phillips	7
10	(England) Martin Dugard	7
11	(Australia) Steven Davies	7
12	(England) Andy Grahame	7
13	(England) Les Collins	6
14	(New Zealand) Gary Allan	5
15	(Australia) Glenn Doyle	0
16	(New Zealand) Darren Wilson	0

*Mitch Shirra and Darren Wilson replaced Larry Ross and Mark Thorpe. Troy Butler replaced Jamie Fagg.

== See also ==
- Motorcycle Speedway
