= 1980 Commonwealth final =

1980 Commonwealth Final

Seasons
- ← 1979 1986 →

The 1980 Commonwealth final was the second running of the Commonwealth Final as part of the qualification for the 1980 Speedway World Championship Final to be held at the Ullevi Stadium in Gothenburg, Sweden. The 1980 Final was run on 29 June at the Wimbledon Stadium in London, England, and was part of the World Championship qualifying for riders from the Commonwealth nations.

== 1980 Commonwealth final ==
- 29 June
- (England) Wimbledon Stadium, London
- Qualification: Top 9 plus 1 reserve to the Intercontinental Final in London

Pos.	Rider	Heat Scores	Total
1	(England) Dave Jessup		14
2	(England) John Louis		13
3	(New Zealand) Ivan Mauger		12
4	(England) John Davis		11
5	(Australia) Billy Sanders		10
6	(England) Chris Morton		9
7	(England) Michael Lee		9
8	(New Zealand) Mitch Shirra		9
9	(England) Peter Collins		7
10	(England) Gordon Kennett		6
11	(New Zealand) Larry Ross		6
12	(England) Phil Collins		5
13	(Australia) John Titman		4
14	(England) Melvyn Taylor		3
15	(Australia) Phil Crump		2
16	(England) Reg Wilson		0
17	(New Zealand) Tony Briggs (Res)		0
18	(Scotland) Bobby Beaton (Res)		0

== See also ==
- Motorcycle Speedway
