= 1979 Commonwealth final =

1979 Commonwealth Final

Seasons
- ← none 1980 →

The 1979 Commonwealth final was the inaugural running of the Commonwealth Final as part of the qualification for the 1979 Speedway World Championship Final to be held at the Silesian Stadium in Chorzów, Poland. The 1979 Final was run on 1 July at the White City Stadium in London, England, and was part of the qualifying for riders from the Commonwealth nations.

Riders from Australia and New Zealand qualified for the new final through the 1979 Australasian Final held at the Rowley Park Speedway in Adelaide, South Australia in February. Those from Great Britain (primarily from England), qualified through the British Championship final held two weeks earlier at the Brandon Stadium in Coventry.

Michael Lee won the event defeating Australian Billy Sanders in a run-off after both riders finished on 14 points.

== 1979 Commonwealth final ==
- 1 July
- (England) White City Stadium, London
- Qualification: Top 9 plus 1 reserve to the Intercontinental Final in London

Pos.	Rider	Total
1	(England) Michael Lee	14+3
2	(Australia) Billy Sanders	14+2
3	(England) Dave Jessup	12
4	(New Zealand) Larry Ross	11
5	(New Zealand) Ivan Mauger	11
6	(England) Peter Collins	10
7	(Australia) John Titman	9
8	(England) Gordon Kennett	8
9	(England) John Davis	7
10	(England) Malcolm Simmons	6
11	(England) Doug Wyer	5
12	(England) John Louis	4
13	(England) Roger Johns	2
14	(Australia) Phil Crump	2
15	(Australia) Steve Koppe	2
16	(England) Alan Molyneux	1
17	(New Zealand) Mitch Shirra (Res)	1
17	(England) Chris Morton (Res)	1

== See also ==
- Motorcycle Speedway
