= 1990 Commonwealth final =

1990 Commonwealth Final

Seasons
- ← 1989 1991 →

The 1990 Commonwealth final was the seventh running of the Commonwealth Finals as part of the qualification for the 1990 Speedway World Championship. The 1990 Final was run on 10 June at the Belle Vue Stadium in Manchester, England, and was part of the World Championship qualifying for riders from the Commonwealth nations.

Riders qualified for the Final from the Australian, British and New Zealand Championships.

== 1990 Commonwealth final ==
- 10 June
- (England) Manchester, Belle Vue Stadium
- Qualification: Top 12 plus 1 reserve to the Overseas Final in Coventry, England

Pos.	Rider	Total
1	(England) Kelvin Tatum	14
2	(England) Martin Dugard	13
3	(England) Simon Cross	12
4	(England) Jeremy Doncaster	11
5	(England) Richard Knight	11
6	(Australia) Todd Wiltshire*	10
7	(England) Gary Havelock	8
8	(Australia) Leigh Adams	8
9	(New Zealand) David Bargh	6
10	(England) Simon Wigg	6
11	(England) Mark Loram	6
12	(Australia) Troy Butler	5+3
13	(England) John Davis	5+2
14	(England) Graham Jones	3
15	(Australia) Glenn Doyle	3
16	(New Zealand) Gary Allan	0

* Todd Wiltshire replaced Australian qualifier Stephen Davies. David Bargh and Gary Allan replaced New Zealand qualifiers Larry Ross and Mark Thorpe

== See also ==
- Motorcycle Speedway
