= Speedway Grand Prix of Austria =

- Stadium: Stadion Wiener Neustadt, Wiener Neustadt
- Years: 1 (1995)
- Track: speedway track
- Track Length: ?

Last Event (season 1995)
- Date: June 17 1995
- Referee: Hennie van den Boomen
- Winner: (United States) Billy Hamill
- 2nd place: (Sweden) Tony Rickardsson
- 3rd place: (Denmark) Hans Nielsen

The Speedway Grand Prix of Austria was a speedway event that was a part of the Speedway Grand Prix Series.

== Previous winners ==
Year	Winners	Runner-up	3rd place
1995	(United States) Billy Hamill	(Sweden) Tony Rickardsson	(Denmark) Hans Nielsen

== Classification ==
Pos	Rider	Team	Total	Gold	Silver	Bronze
1.	Billy Hamill	United States	1	1	—	—
2.	Tony Rickardsson	Sweden	1	—	1	—
3.	Hans Nielsen	Denmark	1	—	—	1

== See also ==
- Sport in Austria
