= Grzegorz Rempala =

American mathematician

Grzegorz Rempała
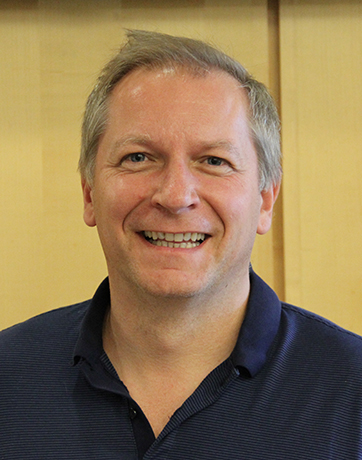
- Grzegorz A. Rempala at the Mathematical Biosciences Institute, 2016
- Born: March 19, 1968 (age 58)
- Scientific career
- Fields: Applied Mathematics
- Workplaces: Ohio State University

Grzegorz (“Greg”) A. Rempala (Polish: Rempała; born March 19, 1968) is a Polish-American applied mathematician who works on the theory and applications of complex stochastic systems.

== Biography ==
Rempala studied mathematics at the University of Warsaw from 1987 to 1991, and worked at the Computer Science Institute of the Polish Academy of Sciences from 1991 to 1992. In 1992 he moved to the US where in 1996 he completed his PhD thesis at Bowling Green State University. His advisor was Prof. Arjun K Gupta. In 1998 he nostrified his degree at the University of Warsaw in the Department of Mathematics. The chair of his nostrification committee was Prof. Stanisław Kwapień. In 2007 he received his habilitation from Warsaw University of Technology. From 1996 until 2008 Rempala was a professor (full professor from 2007) in the Department of Mathematics at the University of Louisville. In 2008 he joined the Department of Biostatistics at the Medical College of Georgia and in 2013 moved to The Ohio State University (OSU) where he is currently a professor in the Division of Biostatistics and in the Department of Mathematics. In 2016 he was named the interim director of the Mathematical Biosciences Institute at OSU, and served in this position until 2018. His wife, Helena Rempala, is a professor of clinical psychology in the Department of Psychiatry and Behavioral Health at OSU. They have two sons, Jaś and Antoś.

== Scientific interests ==
Rempala is known for his work on random matrices, in particular on a random permanent function. He has also established some results in nonparametric statistics related to central limit theorems for products of random variables. He has worked on mathematical models of chemical reactions, diversity of molecular populations, and disease spread across contact networks. His more recent work focuses on dynamical survival analysis for epidemic models. He is a collaborator of the IBS Biomedical Mathematics Group.

== See also ==
- Computing the permanent
- Central limit theorem
