= Stadion Wiener Neustadt =

Former football and speedway stadium in Austria

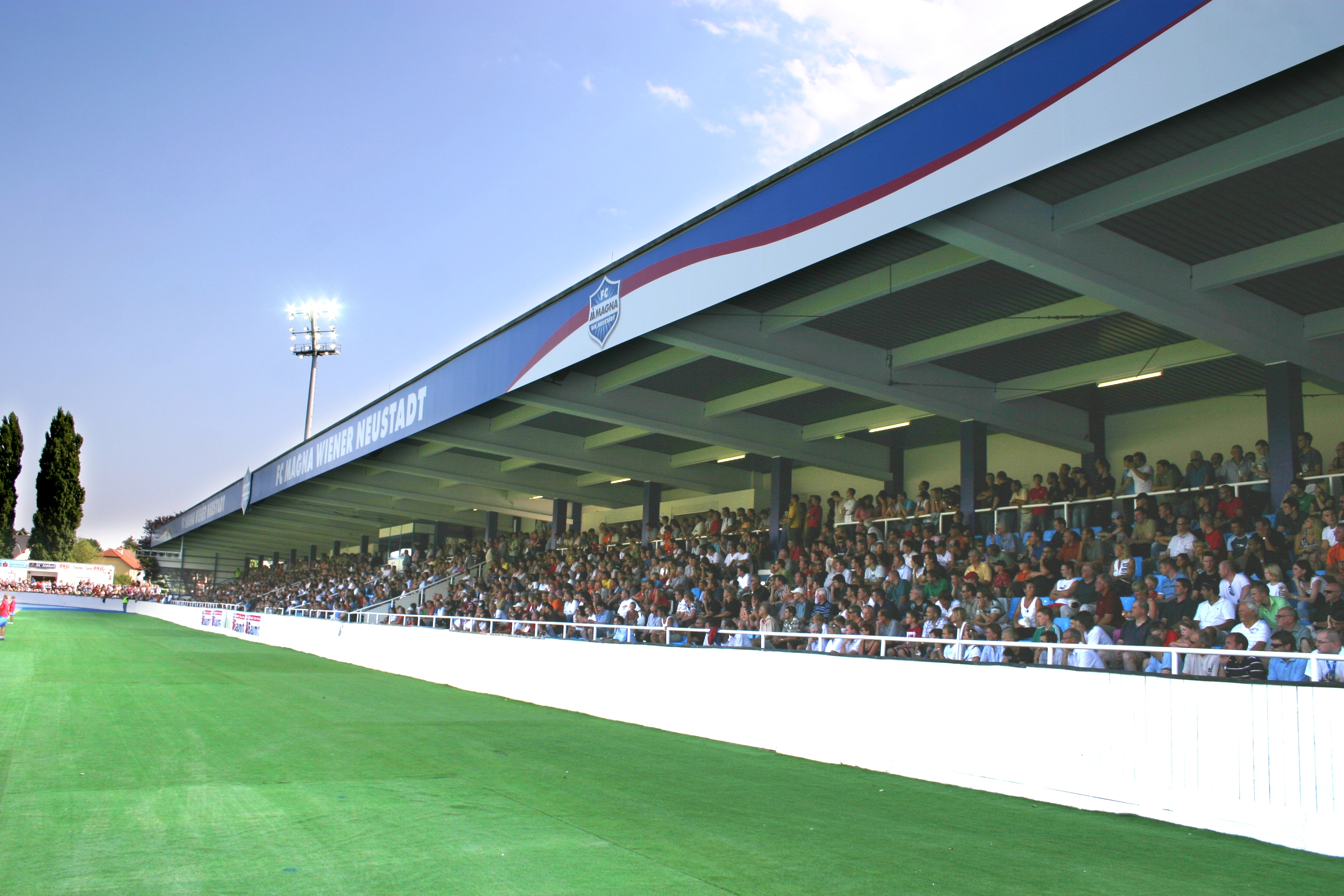
- The stadium after the 2008 upgrade
- Interactive map of Stadion Wiener Neustadt
- Location: Wiener Neustadt, Austria
- Coordinates: 47°49′22″N 16°15′19″E
- Capacity: 4,290

Construction
- Built: 1955
- Opened: 19 May 1955
- Renovated: 2008
- Closed: 2020
- Demolished: 23 April 2020

Tenants
- Wiener Neustädter SC (1955–2009); SC Wiener Neustadt (2008–2019) motorcycle speedway

Stadion Wiener Neustadt, also known as the Magna Arena, was a stadium in Wiener Neustadt, Austria. It was used for association football matches and motorcycle speedway. The football team SC Wiener Neustadt played at the stadium as did former Austrian champions 1. Wiener Neustädter SC at one time.

== History ==
After three years of construction the stadium opened its gates on 19 May 1955. On opening former Nationalliga team 1. Wiener Neustädter SC used the stadium for their home matches.

The record attendance at the stadium was on 14 September 1963, when 12,000 people watched the match between SC Wiener Neustadt and Austria Wien and celebrated a surprise 1–0 home victory. Other highlights include the first leg of the Austrian Cup 1964–65 between SC Wiener Neustadt and LASK Linz and a match in the European Cup Winners' Cup 1965–66 against Romanian sides Ştiinţa Cluj on 1 September 1965. SV Admira Wiener Neustadt played at the stadium during the 1972–73 season.

The venue held a series of major speedway events throughout its existence, including rounds of the Speedway World Team Cup in 1978, 1986 to 1989 and 1993 and rounds of the Speedway World Pairs Championship in 1988, 1990 and 1993. In 1995, the 1995 Speedway Grand Prix of Austria (the individual world championship round) was held at the stadium.

During the 1980s, Stadion Wiener Neustadt was extensively modernized, including the installation of floodlights and the completion of the roofed main stand. The Austrian Supercup final was staged in the stadium in 1992. After SC Wiener Neustadt were relegated from the Austrian second division in 1995, no professional football was played in the stadium until 2008 when FC Magna Wiener Neustadt from nearby Oberwaltersdorf decided to play their home matches there.

During this move, the existing floodlight system was converted and adaptations were made for spectators (new bucket seats, service containers), players (cabin wing) and television (commentary booths, transmission facilities). The playing field received new turf and during football games, the speedway track was covered with artificial turf that was originally laid in Vienna's Ernst Happel Stadium for the 2008 European Football Championship. A total of 1.2 million euros were invested in the stadium in 2008.

In 2017, the stadium was known as the Teddybären & Plüsch-Stadion for sponsorship reasons. In mid-March 2018, the municipal council of Wiener Neustadt unanimously decided to award the contract for a new stadium at a special meeting. The new stadium known as the Wiener Neustadt Arena opened on 28 September 2019.

Consequently, the Stadion Wiener Neustadt was no longer needed and was closed before being demolished on 23 April 2020. There are plans for 500 apartments to be built on the site.
