= Josh Larsen (speedway rider) =

American speedway rider

- Born: May 12, 1972 (age 54); Anaheim, California
- Nationality: American

Career history
- 1992-1993, 1995, 2004-2005: Arena Essex Hammers
- 1996: London Lions
- 1997: Bradford Dukes
- 1999: Eastbourne Eagles
- 2003: Belle Vue Aces

Individual honours
- 1986, 1987: USA Junior National Champion
- 2000: USA Open Champion

Team honours
- 1993: World Team Cup winner

Josh Randall Larsen (born May 12, 1972) is a former American motorcycle speedway rider who was a member of the winning American 1993 Speedway World Team Cup team, rode in the 1994 World Individual Speedway Final and in the 1995 Speedway Grand Prix. He earned 11 caps for the United States national speedway team.

== Career ==
Larsen first came to ride in Europe for Arena Essex during the 1992 British League season, upon the 'Hammers' elevation to the First Division in 1992. He'd been widely touted as the latest sensation to come out of the United States. Larsen started the season in the reserve berth.

Larsen made real progress in 1993, though, when he built upon his debutant year to improve his average significantly. He was a match winner on multiple occasions, scoring countless 5-1's at home alongside Hammers no.1 rider Leigh Adams and helping the USA to World Team Cup victory at Coventry. Larsen was so popular that a coach load of Hammers fans travelled to the Czech Republic to cheer him on in the World Under-21 championship - a meeting which was eventually won by Mikael Karlsson (now Max) with Larsen finishing sixth.

But come 1994 and Larsen dropped a bombshell on the Hammers - he was staying at home to train as a fireman. It was a devastating blow for the club, particularly as the side were forced to start the season without a recognised third heat leader. Larsen continued to ride in the US and in world championship rounds - he made his world final debut at Vojens that year, finishing high enough up the leader board to qualify for the inaugural Grand Prix series in 1995.

With Larsen a fully fledged GP rider and faced with a busy European season, he returned 'home' to Arena-Essex in '95. Sadly for both him and Hammers fans, a serious back injury sustained in Germany sidelined him for two months and put paid to his World Championship aspirations. Larsen moved with the promotion to the London Lions in 1996 and switched to Bradford in 1997 when the Hackney side shut, helping the Dukes to Elite League success. He stayed at home in 1998 before returning to Britain the following season to ride for Eastbourne. A long absence from Britain followed, by which time Larsen was working as a camera assistant for a large US production company.

An unrewarding spell at Belle Vue in 2003 looked to have signalled the end of Larsen's UK racing aspirations - but the Hammers' membership of the Elite League in 2004 resulted in a third spell at Arena-Essex for the popular American when it was clear he was keen to return. Once he adapted to life back in Britain he proved a useful asset - but 2005 was a different story. He struggled for points early on and then fought a seemingly never-ending battle against injury - he hurt his back riding for his country; suffered a broken ankle against Coventry; and snapped his collarbone at Eastbourne to put a premature end to his season and - to date - his British career.

== World Final appearances ==
- 1994 - (Denmark) Vojens, Speedway Center - 9th - 7pts

== Speedway Grand Prix results ==
Year	Position	Points	Best finish	Notes
1995	22nd	7	15th	15th in Denmark

== Results ==
World (European) U-21 Championship

- 1993 - (Czech Republic) Pardubice - 5th - 8pts

Speedway World Team Cup

- 1993 - (England) Coventry, Coventry Stadium - Winner - 40pts (5)
- 1999 - (Czech Republic) Pardubice - 3rd - 29pts (2)

== See also ==
- United States national speedway team
- List of Speedway Grand Prix riders
