= King's Lynn Stadium =

UK motorsport racing track

King's Lynn Stadium Adrian Flux Arena
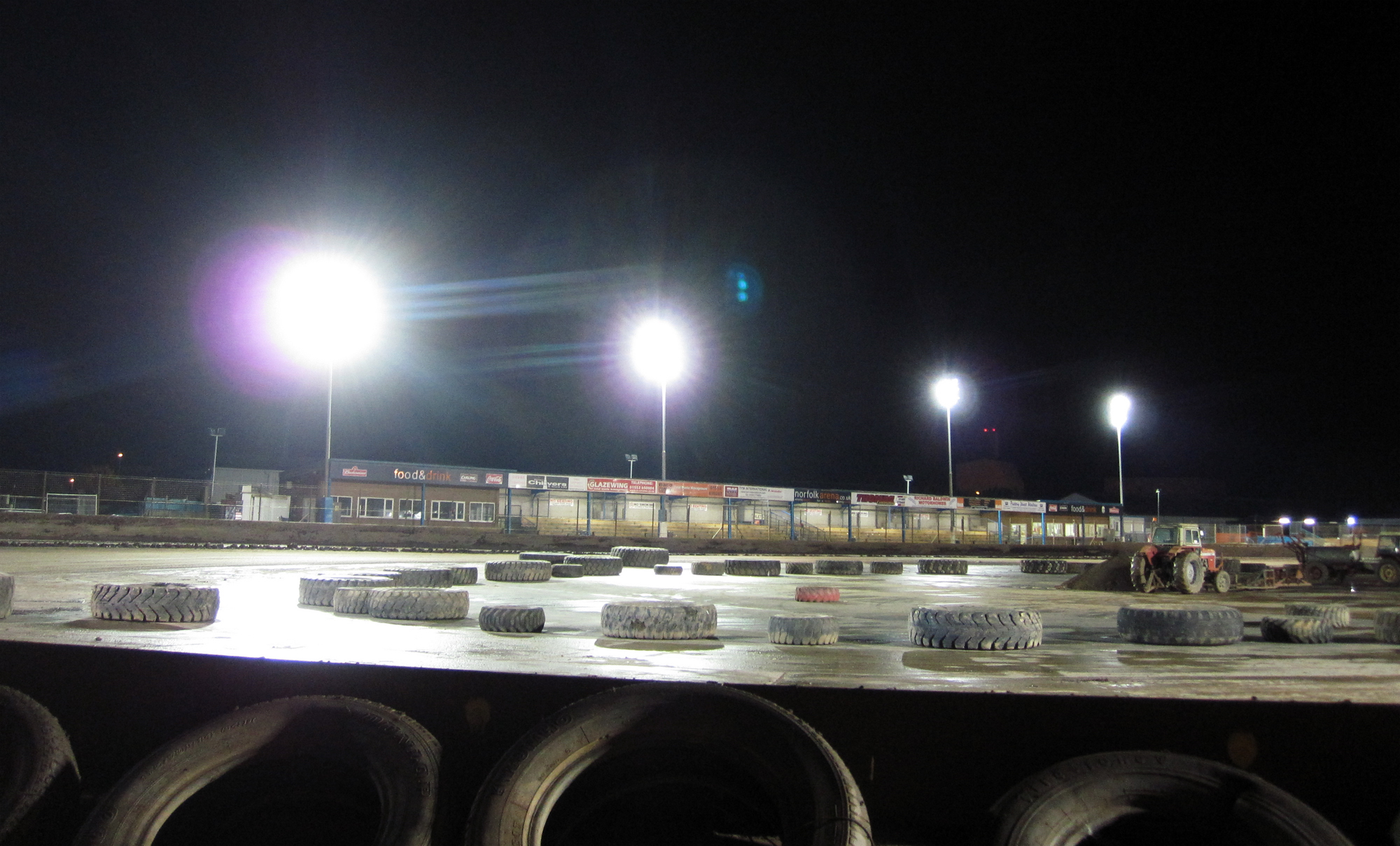
- Interactive map of King's Lynn Stadium; Adrian Flux Arena
- Location: Saddlebow Road; King's Lynn; Norfolk; PE34 3AG
- Coordinates: 52°43′48″N 0°23′20″E

Construction
- Opened: 1951

King's Lynn Stadium, also known as the Adrian Flux Arena and previously as the Norfolk Arena, is a short oval stadium situated to the south of King's Lynn, Norfolk, England. It currently hosts BriSCA Formula 1 Stock Car Racing, Banger racing, motorcycle speedway and is also a former greyhound racing track.

The track itself is a 342m shale track, in the stock car world it has been referenced as the best shale track in the UK.

== Origins ==
The stadium was constructed in 1951 on the west side of Saddlebow Road, adjacent to a poultry farm. It originally opened for greyhound racing.

== Stock car racing ==
Since 1955 it has hosted BriSCA Formula 1 Stock Car Racing, for which it has hosted World Final events for in 2007, 2009, 2013, 2015 and 2019. It is set to hold the World Final again in September 2020 with this year's winner Tom Harris defending his title.

== Speedway ==
The stadium has been the home of the King's Lynn Stars King’s Lynn Stars speedway team since 1965. It hosted the Final of the 1984 European (World) Under-21 Championship won by England's Marvyn Cox.

The shale-surfaced track is 342 metres (374 yards) long and is surrounded by a solid steel plate fence and like most international speedway venues, the fences in the turns are protected by an air fence.

== Sidecar Speedway ==
Three-wheeled motorcycle racing has been a regular visitor to Saddlebow Road over the years, the most prodigious event being the World Cup (The Gold Trophy). It was hosted in 2008 and won by Australian's Darrrin Treloar & Justin Plaisted.

== Greyhound racing ==
Independent greyhound racing (not affiliated to the sport's governing body the National Greyhound Racing Club) began on 27 August 1951. It is believed that greyhound racing at the stadium ended in 1966.

== Other uses ==
Other short oval formulas such as Banger racing also appear regularly at the track and the stadium also hosts drifting and stunt events.
