= Henrik Gustafsson =

Swedish speedway rider

Henka Gustafsson
- Born: 14 August 1970 (age 56); Sköllersta, Sweden
- Nationality: Swedish

Career history

Sweden
- 1986-2005, 2011: Indianerna
- 2009: Rospiggarna
- 2010: Valsarna

Great Britain
- 1990-1993: King's Lynn Stars
- 1994, 2001: Belle Vue Aces
- 2002: Poole Pirates
- 2005: Oxford Cheetahs

Poland
- 1992: KS Toruń
- 1993: WTS Wrocław
- 1994: ZKŻ Zielona Góra
- 1995-2001: Polonia Bydgoszcz
- 2002: Wybrzeże Gdańsk
- 2003: Warsaw

Denmark
- 2005: Fredericia
- 2008: Grindsted

Individual honours
- 1995, 2000: Swedish Champion
- 1986, 1987, 1988, 1989: Swedish U21 champion
- 1988: Nordic Longtrack Champion
- 1989: Swedish Longtrack Champion

Team honours
- 1993: World Pairs Champion
- 1994, 2000: World Team Cup Winner
- 1990, 1991: Swedish Elite League Winner
- 1993, 1997, 1998, 2000: Polish League Championship winner
- 2005: Craven Shield Winner
- 2005: Danish League Champion
- 1994: Swedish Pairs Champion

Henrik Anders (Henka) Gustafsson (born 14 August 1970) is a Swedish former Motorcycle speedway rider. He won the 1993 World Pairs Championship with Tony Rickardsson and the Speedway World Team Cup in 1994 and 2000. He earned 50 caps for the Sweden national speedway team.

== Career ==
Gustafsson, rode for Indianerna in the Swedish Elite League starting in 1986. Gustafsson rode in the first of his four Speedway World Finals in 1990, despite failing to qualify for the 1990 World Final in Bradford, England, he got a lucky break when he replaced the injured Dane Jan O. Pedersen. Supposed to be one who was "there for the experience" in his first World Final, Henka impressed many by finishing a surprise 6th in the final, winning two of his five rides. After his first three rides, he was in equal first place with eventual winner and fellow Swede Per Jonsson and Australia's Todd Wiltshire.

Gustafsson first rode in Britain during a few matches for the 1990 season for the King's Lynn Stars before signing for the 1991 British League season. He topped the King's Lynn averages in 1991 and 1992, establishing himself as one of the league's leading riders. In January 1991, Gustafsson toured Australia with the Swedish team alongside Per Jonsson, Jimmy Nilsen, Peter Nahlin, Erik Stenlund, Conny Ivarsson and Tony Rickardsson. The Swedes defeated the Aussies 3–2 in a five match series.

Gustafsson's first season riding in the Polish top division was 1992 with KS Toruń and then rode for WTS Wrocław in 1993, helping them to become Polish League champions. Gustafsson qualified for the 1992 World Final in Wrocław, Poland where he improved to finish fifth, again winning two of his five rides and improved again in the 1993 World Final in Denmark, finishing fourth and winning three of his rides.

In the 1994 World Final, the last before the Speedway Grand Prix series started in 1995, Gustafsson finished in seventh place winning only one of his rides. Also in 1994, Gustafsson signed for ZKŻ Zielona Góra in Poland and won the Swedish Pairs Championship. In Britain, after four years with King's Lynn he asked to be put on the transfer list and eventually joined Belle Vue Aces mid-way through the 1994 season. After the 1994 season, he then took a seven-year break from riding in the British leagues.

Gustafsson won his first Speedway Swedish Individual Championship in 1995 and signed for Polonia Bydgoszcz in Poland, staying with them until 2001, again winning the Polish League in 1997, 1998 and 2000. He became champion of Sweden for the second time in 2000.

Gustafsson would then ride in the speedway Grand Prix series as a regular rider from 1995 until 2000, finishing a best fifth overall in both 1996 and 1997. His best placings in one of the Grand Prix events was a second in Sweden in 1996 and a second as a Wild Card rider in the 2001 German GP.

The 2002 season saw Gustafsson on the move again, returning to the British leagues with Poole Pirates for one season and leaving Bydgoszcz for Wybrzeże Gdańsk. The following season in 2003 was his last season in Poland with Warsaw.

Gustafsson then returned for one last season in Britain with the Oxford Cheetahs in 2005, winning the Craven Shield while with Oxford.

== Family ==
Gustafsson's son, Simon (born 25 May 1990) has followed in his father's footsteps and has also become a speedway rider, riding for the Eastbourne Eagles in Britain and Start Gniezno in Poland.

== World final appearances ==
=== Individual World Championship ===
- 1990 - (England) Bradford, Odsal Stadium - 6th - 9pts
- 1992 - (Poland) Wrocław, Olympic Stadium - 5th - 9pts
- 1993 - (Germany) Pocking, Rottalstadion - 4th - 10pts
- 1994 - (Denmark) Vojens, Speedway Center - 7th - 9pts

=== World Pairs Championship ===
- 1991 - (Poland) Poznań, Olimpia Poznań Stadium (with Per Jonsson / Jimmy Nilsen) - 2nd - 24pts (9)
- 1992 - (Italy) Lonigo, Pista Speedway (with Per Jonsson / Tony Rickardsson) - 3rd - 22pts (8)
- 1993 - (Denmark) Vojens, Speedway Center (with Tony Rickardsson / Per Jonsson) - Winner - 26pts (6)

=== World Team Cup ===
- 1988 - USA Long Beach, Veterans Memorial Stadium (with Conny Ivarsson / Tony Olsson / Jimmy Nilsen / Per Jonsson) - 3rd - 22pts (4)
- 1991 - (Denmark) Vojens, Speedway Center (with Tony Rickardsson /Per Jonsson / Jimmy Nilsen / Peter Nahlin) - 2nd - 30pts (7)
- 1992 - (Sweden) Kumla, Kumla Speedway (with Tony Rickardsson / Per Jonsson / Jimmy Nilsen / Peter Nahlin) - 2nd - 33pts (12)
- 1993 - (England) Coventry, Brandon Stadium (with Peter Karlsson / Per Jonsson / Tony Rickardsson / Peter Nahlin) - 3rd - 28pts (6)
- 1994 - (Germany) Brokstedt, Holsteinring Brokstedt (with Tony Rickardsson / Mikael Karlsson) - Winner - 23pts (11)
- 1995 - (Poland) Bydgoszcz, Polonia Bydgoszcz Stadium (with Tony Rickardsson / Peter Karlsson) - 4th - 19+2 pts (4)
- 2000 - (England) Coventry, Brandon Stadium (with Tony Rickardsson / Mikael Karlsson / Peter Karlsson / Niklas Klingberg) - Winner - 40+3 pts (10)

=== Individual Under-21 World Championship ===
- 1988 - (Czechoslovakia) Slaný, Slaný Speedway Stadium - 2nd - 11+3 pts
- 1989 - (Italy) Lonigo, Santa Marina Stadium - 4th - 11 pts

== Speedway Grand Prix results ==
Year	Position	Points	Best finish	Notes
1995	8th	73+3	4th	4th in British GP
1996	5th	80	3rd	4th in Germany
1996	5th	80	2nd	2nd in Sweden
1997	15th	20	5th	5th in Czech Republic
1998	15th	43	5th	5th in Germany
1999	17th	35	8th	
2000	14th	39	8th	
2001	17th	33	2nd	2nd in Germany

== World Longtrack Championship ==
- 1985 - Semi-final
- 1985 - (Germany) Pfarrkirchen 11pts (7th)
- 1985 - (Germany) Mühldorf 9pts (9th)
- 1985 - (Czech Republic) Mariánské Lázně 9pts (9th)
- 1985 - Semi-final
