= Tommy Knudsen =

Danish speedway rider

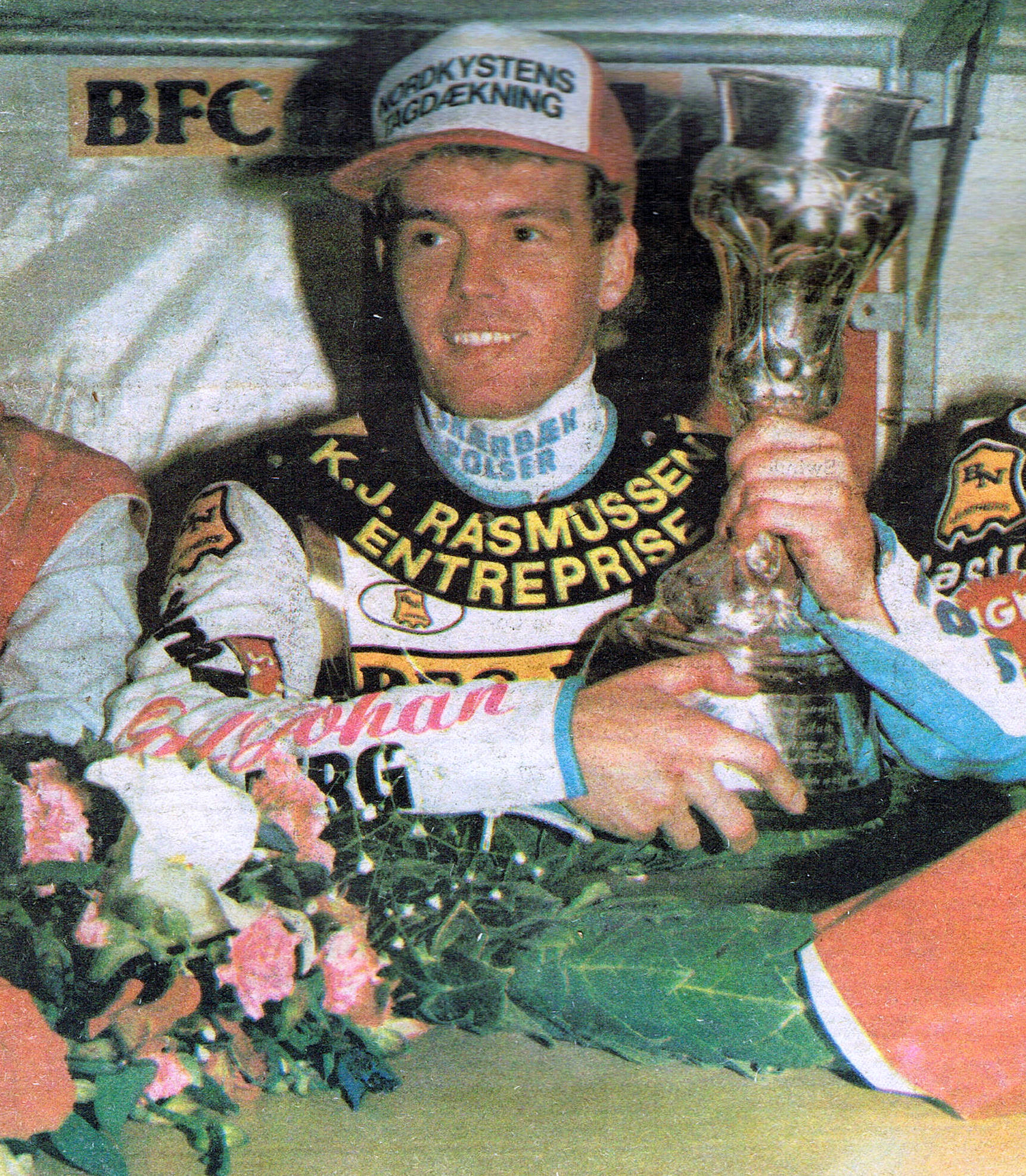
- Born: 9 November 1961 (age 65); Roager, Denmark
- Nationality: Danish

Career history

Denmark
- 1984–1988: Vojens
- 1990–1994: Fredericia
- 1997: Holstebro

Great Britain
- 1979–1988, 1990–1992: Coventry Bees

Poland
- 1992–1997: Wrocław

Individual honours
- 1997: Danish Champion
- 1975, 1976: Danish Under-16 Champion
- 1978: Danish Under-21 Champion
- 1980: European Under-21 Champion
- 1981, 1985, 1993: Nordic Champion
- 1997: Danish Final winner
- 1982, 1984: Brandonapolis
- 1982: Pride of the East
- 1982: Golden Gauntlets
- 1985, 1987, 1994: Danish Gold Bar
- 1986: Midland Riders' Champion
- 1988: Lobos Tomicek Memorial

Team honours
- 1981, 1985, 1986 1987, 1988, 1991 1995, 1997: World Team Cup
- 1985, 1991: World Pairs Champion
- 1979, 1987, 1988: British League Champion
- 1979, 1981, 1982: Midland Cup
- 1980: Midland League
- 1981, 1985, 1987: British League Cup

Competition record

Representing Denmark

Speedway World Championship
Bronze medal – third place	1981	

Speedway World Team Cup
Gold medal – first place	1981	
Gold medal – first place	1985	
Gold medal – first place	1986	
Gold medal – first place	1987	
Gold medal – first place	1988	
Gold medal – first place	1991	
Gold medal – first place	1995	
Gold medal – first place	1997	
Silver medal – second place	1982	
Silver medal – second place	1993	
Bronze medal – third place	1990	
Bronze medal – third place	1994	

Speedway World Pairs Championship
Gold medal – first place	1985	
Gold medal – first place	1991	
Bronze medal – third place	1993	

Intercontinental Cup
Bronze medal – third place	1986	

Tommy Knudsen (born 9 November 1961 in Roager, Denmark) is a former Motorcycle speedway rider who won eight Speedway World Team Cups, and two World Pairs. He earned 81 caps for the Denmark national speedway team.

He is not to be confused with Tom P. Knudsen (born 1968), another rider from the period.

== Career ==
Knudsen first became known when he won the Danish Under-16 Championships of 1975 and 1976 before becoming the Danish Under-21 Champion in 1978. Knudsen started racing in the United Kingdom during second half meetings in 1978. He was signed up by Coventry Bees in 1979 and was touted as a future champion.

Knudsen won the 1980 Individual Speedway Junior European Championship and recorded an 8.10 average for Coventry during the 1980 British League season. Knudsen also raced in Australia during the 1980s, winning the "Mr Melbourne" title at the Melbourne Showgrounds in January 1987, and a week later finished third behind fellow Dane Hans Nielsen and American Rick Miller in the West End Speedway International at the Wayville Showground in Adelaide.

Knudsen was matching Ole Olsen's average at Coventry during 1981 and helped the Bees win the League Cup and Midland Cup. That season he also made his first World Final appearance, finishing third at the 1981 Individual Speedway World Championship at Wembley Stadium in London, after losing a ride-off for second to countryman Ole Olsen. Knudsen had earlier defeated Olsen to win the opening heat of the World Final and a large number of fans and members of the speedway press believed that Knudsen would become Denmark's next world champion.

Unfortunately for Knudsen, two fellow Danish riders Erik Gundersen and Hans Nielsen emerged and became the world's leading riders, which arguably denied Knudsen his chance of becoming a world individual champion. However, because the Danes dominated world speedway, Knudsen was able to win eight World Team Cup's in 1981, 1985, 1986, 1987, 1988, 1991, 1995 and 1997 and two Speedway World Pairs titles in 1985 and 1991. Although he rode in a further five World Finals (1985, 1986, 1991, 1992 and 1994), Knudsen would never again finish on the podium in a World Final, his best placing being fourth in 1992. At the 1985 Final held in Los Angeles, Knudsen was undefeated on the night, famously holding out US team captain Bobby Schwartz in the penultimate heat to ensure Denmark could not be beaten.

During this golden period of speedway for the Danes, Knudsen remained loyal to the Coventry Bees, riding for them from 1979 to 1988 and again from 1990 to 1992, captaining the team and remaining one of the league's best riders.

Knudsen announced his retirement at the end of August 1990 after a crash in Australia but returned to racing the following year.

== World final appearances ==
=== Individual World Championship ===
- 1981 - (England) London, Wembley Stadium - 3rd - 12+2pts
- 1985 - (England) Bradford, Odsal Stadium - 6th - 10pts
- 1986 - (Poland) Chorzów, Silesian Stadium - 5th - 10pts
- 1991 - (Sweden) Gothenburg, Ullevi - 4th - 11+2pts
- 1992 - (Poland) Wrocław, Olympic Stadium - 4th - 9pts
- 1994 - (Denmark) Vojens, Speedway Center - 5th - 10pts

=== World Pairs Championship ===
- 1985 - (Poland) Rybnik, Rybnik Municipal Stadium (with Erik Gundersen) - Winner - 29pts (13)
- 1991 - (Poland) Poznań, Olimpia Poznań Stadium (with Hans Nielsen / Jan O. Pedersen) - Winner - 28pts (0)
- 1992 - (Italy) Lonigo, Santa Marina Stadium (with Hans Nielsen / Brian Karger) - 5th - 16pts (1)
- 1993 - (Denmark) Vojens, Speedway Center (with Hans Nielsen / Brian Karger) - 3rd - 21pts (6)

=== World Team Cup ===
- 1981 - (West Germany) Olching, Olching Speedwaybahn (with Ole Olsen / Hans Nielsen / Erik Gundersen / Finn Thomsen) - Winner - 36pts (9)
- 1982 - (England) London, White City (with Ole Olsen / Hans Nielsen / Erik Gundersen / Preben Eriksen) - 2nd - 24pts (1)
- 1985 - (United States) Long Beach, Veterans Memorial Stadium (with Erik Gundersen / Hans Nielsen / Preben Eriksen / Bo Petersen) - Winner - 37pts (12)
- 1986 - (Sweden) Gothenburg, Ullevi, (Denmark) Vojens, Speedway Center and (England) Bradford, Odsal Stadium (with Hans Nielsen / Erik Gundersen / Jan O. Pedersen / John Jørgensen) - Winner - 129pts (33)
- 1987 - (Denmark) Fredericia, Fredericia Speedway, (England) Coventry, Brandon Stadium and (Czech Republic) Prague, Markéta Stadium (with Hans Nielsen / Erik Gundersen / Jan O. Pedersen)- Winner - 130pts (32)
- 1988 - (United States) Long Beach, Veterans Memorial Stadium (with Hans Nielsen / Jan O. Pedersen / Erik Gundersen / John Jørgensen) - Winner - 44pts (6)
- 1990 - (Czech Republic) Pardubice, Svítkov Stadion (with Hans Nielsen / John Jørgensen / Bo Petersen / Brian Karger) - 3rd - 30pts (4)
- 1991 - (Denmark) Vojens, Speedway Center (with Jan O. Pedersen / Hans Nielsen / Gert Handberg / Brian Karger) - Winner - 51pts (13)
- 1993 - (England) Coventry, Brandon Stadium (with Brian Karger / Hans Nielsen / John Jørgensen / Brian Andersen) - 2nd - 38pts (12)
- 1994 - (Germany) Brokstedt, Holsteinring Brokstedt (with Hans Nielsen / Jan Staechmann) - 3rd - 17pts (12)
- 1995 - (Poland) Bydgoszcz, Polonia Bydgoszcz Stadium (with Hans Nielsen / Brian Karger) - Winner - 28pts (15)
- 1997 - (Poland) Piła, Stadion Żużlowy Centrum (with Hans Nielsen / Jesper B. Jensen) - Winner - 27pts (13)

=== Individual Under-21 World Championship ===
- 1980 - (West Germany) Pocking, Rottalstadion - Winner - 14pts

== Speedway Grand Prix results ==
Year	Position	Points	Best Finish	Notes
1995	10th	67	Winner	Won German and Swedish Grand Prix
1996	11th	44	Winner	Won Polish Grand Prix
