= Dariusz Śledź =

Polish speedway rider

- Born: 15 September 1969 (age 57); Lublin, Poland
- Nationality: Polish

Current club information
- Manager: Atlas Wrocław - team manager

Career history

Poland
- 1986–1991, 2003–2004, 2007: Lublin
- 1992–2000: Wrocław
- 2001: Rybnik
- 2005–2006: Rzeszów

Great Britain
- 2004: Peterborough Panthers

Individual honours
- 1993: Polish Golden Helmet Winner

Team honours
- 1993, 1994, 1995: Team Polish Champion
- 2005: Polish Pairs Champion

Dariusz Śledź (born 15 September 1969) is a former motorcycle speedway rider from Poland. He earned seven international caps for the Poland national speedway team.

== Career ==
Śledź first came to prominence after reaching the final of the 1990 Speedway Under-21 World Championship, finishing 12th. He rode in the 1995 Speedway Grand Prix of Poland. Śledź won the Polish league three times and spent most oh his career with Lublin and Wrocław.

In 2004, Śledź rode for Peterborough Panthers in the British speedway leagues, during the 2004 Elite League speedway season but only rode in six matches.

In February 2009, Śledź was appointed coach of the speedway club Stal Rzeszów, after previously managing the WTS Atlas team.

In 2019, Śledź became a manager of Sparta Wroclaw.

== Results ==
=== Speedway Grand Prix results ===
1995 SGP
	Grand Prix	Pos.	Pts.	Heats	Draw
1 (1)	[[1995 Speedway Grand Prix of Poland|]]	10	10	(1,0,M,1,3) +2C	16

permanent speedway rider
wild card, track reserve or qualified reserve
rider not classified (track reserve who did not start)

=== World Championships ===
- Individual World Championship (Speedway Grand Prix)
  - 1994 - 13th place in World Semi Final 2
  - 1995 - 22nd place (7 points in three event)
- Team World Championship (Speedway World Team Cup)
  - 1990 - 4th place in Group B
  - 1991 - 3rd place in Group C
  - 1993 - 3rd place in Group A
  - 1994 - Runner-up (0 points)
- Individual U-21 World Championship
  - 1990 - 12th place (5 points)

== See also ==
- Poland national speedway team
- List of Speedway Grand Prix riders
- Speedway in Poland
