= Jan Stæchmann =

Danish speedway rider and manager

- Born: 5 June 1966 (age 60); Kolding, Denmark
- Nationality: Danish

Career history

Denmark
- 1988–1989, 1996: Vojens
- 1990, 1992: Holsted
- 1991, 2001: Slangerup

Great Britain
- 1985–1990: Wolverhampton Wolves
- 1991–1994: Long Eaton Invaders
- 1995–1996: Hull Vikings
- 1998–2000, 2003: Oxford Cheetahs
- 2001–2005: Stoke Potters

Sweden
- 1989: Eskilstuna
- 1991: Getingarna
- 2000: Valsarna

Individual honours
- 1991: British League Div. 2 Riders Champion

Team honours
- 2006 & 2008: World Cup winner (as manager)

Jan Stæchmann (born 5 June 1966 in Kolding, Denmark) is a former professional motorcycle speedway rider and manager of the Danish national team. He earned 13 caps for the Denmark national speedway team.

== Career ==
In 1991, Stæchmann won the British League Division Two Riders Championship, held on 14 September at Brandon Stadium.

Stæchmann led Denmark to the 2006 Speedway World Cup and 2008 Speedway World Cup, as well as the 2010 U21 Team World Championship.

In the British leagues, Stæchmann most notably rode for Wolverhampton Wolves but also rode for Long Eaton Invaders, Hull Vikings, Oxford Cheetahs and Stoke Potters.

Stæchmann joined commercial rights holders BSI Speedway (IMG) on their media production team as broadcast co-commentator for 2011 and 2012. He had a short stint as team manager for Swindon Robins at end of 2011, and Peterborough Panthers 2012 until mid 2013.

Stæchmannworks freelance for Danish TV station TV3 Sport whom he joined in 2014, as broadcast commentator on Speedway Grand Prix and Speedway World Cup.

Stæchmann is a member of FIM's Track Racing Bureau since 2013.

== World Final appearances ==
- 1994 - (Denmark) Vojens, Speedway Center - 10th - 7pts

== Speedway Grand Prix results ==
Year	Position	Points	Best finish	Notes
1995	15th	23	13th	
1996	NC	-	-	

== See also ==
- Denmark national speedway team
- List of Speedway Grand Prix riders
