= Marvyn Cox =

British motorcycle speedway rider

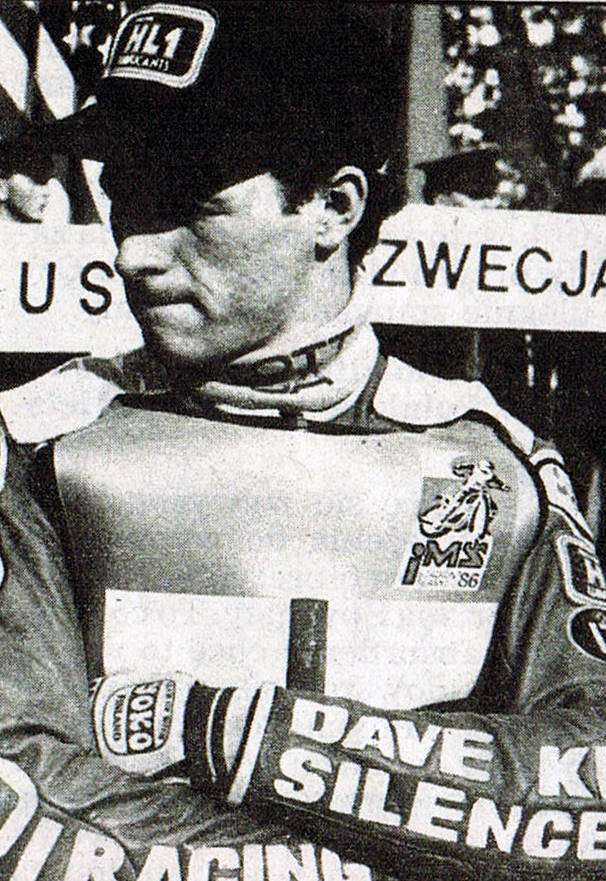
- Born: 11 July 1964; Whitstable, Kent
- Nationality: British (English)

Career history

Great Britain
- 1981-1983: Rye House Rockets
- 1982, 1983: Hackney Hawks
- 1984–1989, 1996: Oxford Cheetahs
- 1990: Bradford Dukes
- 1991–1992, 1997–1998: Poole Pirates
- 1995: Reading Racers

Sweden
- 1994–1996: Valsarna

Individual honours
- 1986, 1994: Speedway World Championship finalist
- 1989, 1990, 1991, 1992, 1994, 1995: Individual Long Track World Championship finalist
- 1993, 1995: German champion
- 1984: European Junior Champion
- 1984: British Under 21 Champion

Team honours
- 1986 (bronze) 1987 (silver): World Team Cup
- 1985, 1986, 1989: British League Champion
- 1985, 1986 (shared): British League KO Cup winner
- 1986 (shared): British League Cup
- 1996: Premier League Four-Team Championship
- 1985, 1986: Midland Cup

Marvyn Cox (born 11 July 1964 in Whitstable, Kent) is a former motorcycle speedway rider. Cox was twice a winner of the German Individual Championship in 1993 and 1995, when he raced under a German licence. At retirement, he had earned 25 international caps for the England national speedway team.

== Domestic career ==
Cox started his British leagues career riding for Rye House Rockets during the 1981 National League season. He made great progress during the 1982 season, improving his average to 8.87 but his season was overshadowed by tragedy when he was involved in an accident with American Denny Pyeatt whilst riding for Hackney in a league match against Reading, in which Pyeatt lost his life.

Cox topped the Rye House averages in 1983, which attracted the interest of Oxford Cheetahs. The Cheetahs signed Cox from Rye House for £15,000. The Oxford team had returned to the British League and the other signings to start as the top five riders for the season were Hans Nielsen for a record £30,000, Simon Wigg for £25,000, Melvyn Taylor for £12,000 and Jens Rasmussen, with Ian Clark and Nigel Sparshott at 6 & 7. During the 1984 season, he won both the European Junior Championship and the British Under 21 Championship.

After a mid-table finish with Oxford in 1984, Cox was part of the Oxford team that won the league and cup double during the 1985 British League season. They repeated the league and cup double the following season during the 1986 British League season and later won a third title during the 1989 British League season. He was a very popular rider at the Cowley circuit.

Cox's form, from an individual perspective, continued to impress, and he reached the final of the 1986 Speedway World Championship and won two medals with England at the Speedway World Team Cup. He also became a leading rider on the Longtrack, reaching six Individual Long Track World Championship finals from 1989 to 1995.

In 1996, Cox returned to Oxford Cheetahs after spells with Bradford, Poole Pirates and Reading Racers, and some time in Germany. His return saw him help Oxford win the Premier League Four-Team Championship, which was held on 4 August 1996, at the East of England Arena.

Cox competed in the first two seasons of the Speedway Grand Prix series in 1995 and 1996 and also rode in the Swedish Elitserien for Valsarna from 1995 to 1996. He finished his career at Poole after two seasons in 1997 and 1998.

== World Final appearances ==
=== Individual World Championship ===
- 1986 - (Poland) Chorzów, Silesian Stadium - 12th - 3pts
- 1994 - (Denmark) Vojens, Speedway Center - 6th - 9pts

=== World Team Cup ===
- 1986 - (England) Bradford, Odsal Stadium (with Simon Wigg / Kelvin Tatum / Jeremy Doncaster / Chris Morton) - 3rd - 81pts (0)
- 1987 - (England) Coventry, Brandon Stadium (with Kelvin Tatum / Jeremy Doncaster / Simon Wigg / Simon Cross) - 2nd - 101pts (2)

== Speedway Grand Prix results ==
- 1995 Speedway Grand Prix- 12th - 54pts
- 1996 Speedway Grand Prix- 18th - 15pts

== World Longtrack Championship Finals ==
- 1989 – (Czechoslovakia) Mariánské Lázně 16pts (10th)
- 1990 – (Germany) Herxheim 23pts (6th)
- 1991 – (Czechoslovakia) Mariánské Lázně 7pts (12th)
- 1992 – (Germany) Pfarrkirchen 5pts (14th)
- 1994 – (Czech Republic) Mariánské Lázně 0pts (18th)
- 1995 – (Germany) Scheeßel 17pts (4th)
