= European Grasstrack Sidecar Championship =

Motorcycle championship organized by Union Européenne

- Category: Motorcycle Racing
- Country: Various
- Region: Europe
- Inaugural season: 1980
- Riders' champion: 2019: William Matthijssen & Sandra Mollema

The European Grasstrack Sidecar Championship is a motorcycle event and is organised by Union Européenne de Motocyclisme. The first championship took place in 1980 at Melsungen, West Germany. It has run every year since except for 2015 as it was cancelled due to Stefan Muller losing his life in practice. The most successful nation is Germany. The European Solo Grasstrack Championship start in 1978.

The championships are run for 500cc Sidecars only and to qualify for the Final there are semi-finals. From 1980 there were two semi-finals and from 2012 there has been just one semi with the others qualifying automatically through there domestic championships. The first ever semi-final took place at Assen in the Netherlands on 19 April 1980. The first winners were the West German team of Otto Bauer and Peter Stiegelbrunner, second were England's Rob Stoneman and Rowland Broomfield and another West German team took third on the podium Harald Haus and Dietmar Haus.

The sport is popular in Germany, the Netherlands, France and the United Kingdom although there have been teams from Switzerland, Denmark, Norway, Sweden and Russia also.

== Most successful ==
Thomas Kunert is the most successful rider. He has taken the title on at eleven occasions and he also has five second and one third. He also holds the record for semi-final wins with 19. Kunert won a semi-final in every year from 1994 to 2007.

== Medalists ==
Year	Venue	First	Second	Third
1980	(Germany) Melsungen	(Germany) Otto Bauer & Peter Stiegelbrunner	(Germany) Egon Waller & Edgar Starke	(Germany) Michael Datzmann & Rosamunde Datzmann
1981	(Netherlands) Assen	(Germany) Michael Datzmann & Rosamunde Datzmann	(Germany) Heinz Pagel & Hans Werner Kempa	(Germany) Otto Bauer & Peter Stiegelbrunner
1982	(Germany) Schwarme	(Germany) Michael Datzmann & Rosamunde Datzmann	(Germany) Heinz Pagel & Jurgen Zaddach	(Germany) Rudolf Meyer & Diter Held
1983	(Netherlands) Assen	(Germany) Michael Datzmann & Rosamunde Datzmann	(Germany) Michael Lippmann & Willi Ganss	(Germany) Heinz Pagel & Jurgen Zaddach
1984	(Germany) Berghaupten	(Germany) Michael Datzmann & Rosamunde Datzmann	(Germany) Heinz Pagel & Jurgen Zaddach	(Germany) Ulrich Wehrle & Stefan Rufat
1985	(Netherlands) Kuinre	(Germany) Heinz Pagel & Jurgen Zaddach	(Germany) Ewald Heim & Robert Heim	(Germany) Karl Keil & Joachim Reeg
1986	(Germany) Bad Waldsee	(Germany) Josef Onderka & Franz Onderka	(Germany) Karl Keil & Reiner Ganster	(Germany) Heinz Pagel & Herbert Bucker
1987	(France) Valence	(Germany) Josef Onderka & Franz Onderka	(Switzerland) Hans Bolliger & Bernhard Gloor	(Germany) Karl Keil & Reiner Ganster
1988	(Germany) Celle	(Germany) Karl Keil & Joachim Reeg	(Germany) Josef Onderka & Franz Onderka	(Netherlands) Marco Glorie & Erik van Dijk
1989	(Germany) Berghaupten	(Germany) Josef Onderka & Josef Feigl	(Switzerland) Hans Bolliger & Bernhard Gloor	(Germany) Karl Keil & Joachim Reeg
1990	(Germany) Haunstetten	(Germany) Josef Onderka & Robert Wolf	(Germany) Karl Keil & Joachim Reeg	(Germany) Bernd Soger & Heinz Brandt
1991	(Netherlands) Eenrum	(Germany) Josef Onderka & Robert Wolf	(Germany) Karl Keil & Joachim Reeg	(Germany) Eward Heim & Robert Heim
1992	(Germany) Berghaupten	(Germany) Josef Onderka & Walter Huber	(Germany) Thomas Kunert & Josef Feigl	(France) Laurent Sambarrey & Lionel Sambarrey
1993	(Germany) Harsewinkel	(Germany) Karl Keil & Joachim Reeg	(Germany) Josef Onderka & Josef Feigl	(Netherlands) Marco Glorie & Harry Drenth
1994	(Netherlands) Lattrop	(Netherlands) Marco Glorie & Harry Drenth	(Germany) Karl Keil & Joachim Reeg	(Germany) Eward Heim & Robert Heim
1995	(Germany) Melsungen	(Germany) Thomas Kunert & Wolfgang Maier	(Germany) Peter Murmann & Stefan Muller	(Netherlands) Marco Glorie & Harry Drenth
1996	(Netherlands) Eenrum	(Germany) Thomas Kunert & Marco Hundsrucker	(Germany) Josef Onderka & Uwe Kuhberger	(France) Jacues Leduc & Michel Gorget
1997	(Germany) Melsungen	(Germany) Josef Onderka & Uwe Kuhberger	(Germany) Thomas Kunert & Marco Hundsrucker	(Germany) Oswald Bischoff & Mario Siebert
1998	(France) Morizès	(Germany) Josef Onderka & Uwe Kuhberger	(Germany) Thomas Kunert & Hermann Bacher	(Germany) Oswald Bischoff & Mario Siebert
1999	(Germany) Vechta	(Germany) Thomas Kunert & Hermann Bacher	(Germany) Josef Onderka & Uwe Kuhberger	(Germany) Oswald Bischoff & Mario Siebert
2000	(Netherlands) Lattrop	(Germany) Josef Onderka & Martin Wamprechtshammer	(Germany) Thomas Kunert & Hermann Bacher	(Netherlands) Marco Glorie & Harry Drenth
2001	(Germany) Melsungen	(Germany) Thomas Kunert & Marco Hundsrucker	(Germany) Oswald Bischoff & Mario Siebert	(Netherlands) Marco Glorie & Harry Drenth
2002	(Netherlands) Siddeburen	(Germany) Josef Onderka & Martin Wamprechtshammer	(Netherlands) William Matthijsen & Erwin Boers	(Germany) Thomas Kunert & Markus Eibl
2003	(Germany) Angenrod	(Germany) Thomas Kunert & Hermann Bacher	(Germany) Oswald Bischoff & Rainer Falter	(Netherlands) William Matthijsen & Erwin Boers
2004	(England) High Easter	(Germany) Thomas Kunert & Bernd Kreuzer	(Netherlands) Tjeerd Hoekstra & Henk Auwema	(Netherlands) William Matthijsen & Nathalie Matthijssen
2005	(Netherlands) Siddeburen	(Netherlands) Sven Holstein & Desiree Daubert	(Netherlands) William Matthijsen & Nathalie Matthijssen	(Netherlands) Mark Detz & Gerald Eelding
2006	(Germany) Melsungen	(Germany) Thomas Kunert & Bernd Kreuzer	(Germany) Markus Brandhofer & Helmut Beller	(Germany) Karl Keil & Berit Tralau
2007	(Netherlands) Eenrum	(Netherlands) William Matthijsen & Nathalie Matthijssen	(Germany) Markus Venus & Florian Niedermeier	(Netherlands) Sven Holstein & Desiree Daubert
2008	(Germany) Bielefeld	(Germany) Thomas Kunert & Markus Eibl	(Netherlands) William Matthijsen & Nathalie Matthijssen	(Germany) Stefan Brandhofer & Marco Hundsrucker
2009	(England) Wimborne	(Netherlands) William Matthijsen & Nathalie Matthijssen	(Germany) Thomas Kunert & Markus Eibl	(Netherlands) Markus Brandhofer & Corinna Gunthor
2010	(Netherlands) Uithuizen	(Germany) Thomas Kunert & Markus Eibl	(Netherlands) William Matthijssen & Sandra Mollema	(Netherlands) Sven Holstein & Anthony Goodwin (England)
2011	(Netherlands) Noordwolde	(Netherlands) William Matthijssen & Nathalie Matthijssen	(Netherlands) Mark Detz & Bonita van Dijk	(Germany) Stefan Brandhofer & Daniel Eibl
2012	(Germany) Werlte	(Germany) Thomas Kunert & Markus Eibl	(Germany) Markus Venus & Markus Heiss	(Germany) Stefan Brandhofer & Daniel Eibl
2013	(Netherlands) Loppersum	(Germany) Thomas Kunert & Markus Eibl	(Netherlands) William Matthijssen & Nathalie Stellingwerf	(France) Christophe Grenier & Gerben Sanders (Netherlands)
2014	(England) High Easter	(United Kingdom) Josh Goodwin & Liam Brown	(United Kingdom) Nick Radley & Abi Radley	(Germany) Markus Venus & Markus Heiss
2015	(Germany) Hertingen	Cancelled as a result of a fatal accident during practice		
2016	(Netherlands) Vries	(Netherlands) William Matthijssen & Sandra Mollema	(Germany) Markus Venus & Markus Heiss	(Germany) Markus Brandhofer & Michael Zapf
2017	(France) Tayac	(Netherlands) William Matthijssen & Sandra Mollema	(Germany) Markus Brandhofer & Tim Scheunemann	(Germany) Markus Venus & Markus Heiss
2018	(Germany) Werlte	(Netherlands) William Matthijssen & Sandra Mollema	(United Kingdom) Mitch Godden & Paul Smith	(Germany) Markus Venus & Markus Heiss
2019	(Netherlands) Eenrum	(Netherlands) William Matthijssen & Sandra Mollema	(Germany) Markus Venus & Markus Heis	(United Kingdom) Mitch Godden & Paul Smith
2020		Cancelled		
2021		Cancelled		
2022	(Netherlands) Eenrum	(Germany) Markus Venus & Markus Eibl	(United Kingdom) Mitch Godden & Paul Smith	(Netherlands) Wilfred Detz & Wendy Arling
2023	(Germany) Bad Hersfeld	(Germany) Markus Brandhofer & Sandra Mollema	(United Kingdom) Mitch Godden & Paul Smith	(Netherlands) Wilfred Detz & Bonita Van Dijk
2024	(Netherlands) Uithuizen	(Germany) Markus Venus & Markus Eibl	(United Kingdom) Mitch Godden & Paul Smith	(France) Guillaume Comblon & Baptiste Comblon
2025	(Germany) Haunstetton	(Germany) Markus Venus & Markus Eibl	(United Kingdom) Mitch Godden & Paul Smith	(France) Guillaume Comblon & Baptiste Comblon
2026	(Germany) Berghaupten	(Germany) Markus Brandhofer & Bridget Merijerink	(United Kingdom) Mitch Godden & Paul Smith	(Germany) Raphael San Millan & Benedikt Zapf

== Driver champions ==
Country	Passenger	First	Second	Third	Podium
(Germany)	Kunert, Thomas	11	5	1	16
(Germany)	Onderka, Josef	10	4	0	14
(Netherlands)	Matthijssen, William	7	5	2	14
(Germany)	Datzmann, Michael	4	0	1	5
(Germany)	Venus, Markus	3	4	3	10
(Germany)	Keil, Karl	2	4	4	10
(Germany)	Brandhofer, Markus	2	2	2	6
(Germany)	Pagel, Heinz	1	3	2	6
(Netherlands)	Glorie, Marco	1	0	5	6
(Netherlands)	Holstein, Sven	1	0	2	3
(Germany)	Bauer, Otto	1	0	1	2
(United Kingdom)	Goodwin, Josh	1	0	0	1
(United Kingdom)	Godden, Mitch	0	6	1	7
(Germany)	Bischoff, Oswald	0	2	3	5
(Switzerland)	Bolliger, Hans	0	2	0	2
(Germany)	Heim, Ewald	0	1	2	3
(Netherlands)	Detz, Wilfred	0	0	2	2
(Netherlands)	Detz, Mark	0	1	1	2
(Germany)	Waller, Egon	0	1	0	1
(Germany)	Lippmann, Michael	0	1	0	1
(Germany)	Murmann, Peter	0	1	0	1
(Netherlands)	Hoekstra, Tjeerd	0	1	0	1
(United Kingdom)	Radley, Nick	0	1	0	1
(Germany)	Brandhofer, Stefan	0	0	3	3
(France)	Comblon, Guillaume	0	0	2	2
(Germany)	Meyer, Rudolf	0	0	1	1
(Germany)	Wehrle, Ulrich	0	0	1	1
(Germany)	Soger, Bernd	0	0	1	1
(France)	Sambarrey, Laurent	0	0	1	1
(France)	Leduc, Jacues	0	0	1	1
(France)	Grenier, Christophe	0	0	1	1
(Germany)	San Millan, Raphael	0	0	1	1

== Passenger champions ==
Country	Passenger	First	Second	Third	Podium
(Germany)	Eibl, Markus	7	1	1	9
(Germany)	Datzmann, Rosamunde	4	0	1	5
(Netherlands)	Matthijssen (Stellingwerf), Nathalie	3	3	1	7
(Netherlands)	Mollema, Sandra	5	1	0	6
(Germany)	Reeg, Joachim	2	3	2	7
(Germany)	Kuhberger, Uwe	2	2	0	4
(Germany)	Bacher, Hermann	2	2	0	4
(Germany)	Onderka, Franz	2	1	3	6
(Germany)	Hundsrucker, Marco	2	1	1	4
(Germany)	Wolf, Robert	2	0	0	2
(Germany)	Wamprechtshammer, Martin	2	0	0	2
(Germany)	Kreuzer, Bernd	2	0	0	2
(Germany)	Zaddach, Jurgen	1	2	1	4
(Germany)	Feigl, Josef	1	2	0	3
(Netherlands)	Drenth, Harry	1	0	4	5
(Netherlands)	Daubert, Desiree	1	0	1	2
(Germany)	Stiegelbrunner, Peter	1	0	1	2
(Germany)	Huber, Walter	1	0	0	1
(Germany)	Maier, Wolfgang	1	0	0	1
(United Kingdom)	Brown, Liam	1	0	0	1
(Netherlands)	Meijerink, Bridget	1	0	0	1
(United Kingdom)	Smith, Paul	0	6	1	7
(Germany)	Heiss, Markus	0	3	2	5
(Switzerland)	Gloor, Bernhard	0	2	0	2
(Germany)	Siebert, Mario	0	1	3	4
(Germany)	Heim, Robert	0	1	2	3
(Netherlands)	Boers, Erwin	0	1	1	2
(Netherlands)	van Dijk, Bonita	0	1	1	2
(Germany)	Starke, Edgar	0	1	0	1
(Germany)	WernerKempa, Hans	0	1	0	1
(Germany)	Ganss, Willi	0	1	0	1
(Germany)	Ganster, Reiner	0	1	1	1
(Germany)	Muller, Stefan	0	1	0	1
(Germany)	Falter, Rainer	0	1	0	1
(Netherlands)	Auwema, Henk	0	1	0	1
(Germany)	Beller, Helmut	0	1	0	1
(Germany)	Niedermeier, Florian	0	1	0	1
(United Kingdom)	Radley, Abi	0	1	0	1
(Germany)	Scheunemann, Tim	0	1	0	1
(France)	Comblon, Baptiste	0	0	2	2
(Germany)	Eibl, Daniel	0	0	2	2
(Netherlands)	Arling, Wendy	0	0	1	1
(Germany)	Held, Diter	0	0	1	1
(Germany)	Rufat, Stefan	0	0	1	1
(Germany)	Bucker, Herbert	0	0	1	1
(Netherlands)	van Dijk, Erik	0	0	1	1
(Germany)	Brandt, Heinz	0	0	1	1
(France)	Sambarrey, Lionel	0	0	1	1
(France)	Gorget, Michel	0	0	1	1
(Netherlands)	Eelding, Gerald	0	0	1	1
(Germany)	Tralau, Berit	0	0	1	1
(Netherlands)	Gunthor, Corinna	0	0	1	1
(United Kingdom)	Goodwin, Anthony	0	0	1	1
(Netherlands)	Sanders, Gerben	0	0	1	1
(Germany)	Zapf, Michael	0	0	1	1
(Germany)	Zapf, Benedikt	0	0	1	1

== Results by country ==
Team	First		Second		Third		Podium
Team	Driver	Passenger	Driver	Passenger	Driver	Passenger	Total
Germany	33	34	27	27	25	25	171
Netherlands	10	9	7	7	13	13	59
England	1	1	6	6	1	2	17
France	0	0	0	0	4	3	7
Switzerland	0	0	2	2	0	0	4

== Medal percentage ==
Country	Percentage
Germany	67.48
Netherlands	23.58
England	5.28
France	2.03
Switzerland	1.63

== European Solo Championship ==
The European Solo Grasstrack championship first ran in 1978.
