= List of paintings by Johan Jongkind =

This is a list of paintings by Dutch painter Johan Jongkind. Jongkind's most frequent subject was the marine landscape.

== 1840s and 1850s ==
Picture	Title	Year	Current location
	Vue de Maassluis en hiver View of Maassluis in Winter	1848	Unknown
	The Pont Neuf	1849–1850	Metropolitan Museum of Art, New York City, U.S.
	Self Portrait by Johan Barthold Jongkind, 1850	1850	Unknown
	Gezicht op Montmartre; View on Monmartre	1850	Museum Boijmans Van Beuningen, Rotterdam, Netherlands
	A Street in Landerneau	1851	Kunstmuseum Den Haag, The Hague, Netherlands
	Notre-Dame Vue du Quai de la Tournelle	1852	Petit Palais, Paris, France
	Saint-Valéry-en-Caux	1852	Kröller-Müller Museum, Otterlo, Netherlands
	The Sea at Etretat	1853	Birmingham Museums Trust, Birmingham, England
	Notre-Dame de Paris, Vue du Quai Saint-Michel Avec le Petit Pont	1854	Louvre, Paris, France
	View from the Quai d'Orsay	1854	Metropolitan Museum of Art, New York City, U.S.
	Clair de Lune à Overschie (Environs de Rotterdam) (Moonlight in Overschie (Surroundings of Rotterdam))	1855	Petit Palais, Paris, France
	River View in France, Possibly near Pontoise	1855	Rijksmuseum, Amsterdam, Netherlands
	Frigates	1850–1855	Clark Art Institute, Williamstown, Massachusetts, U.S.
	Haven van Rotterdam; Rotterdam Harbour	1856	Stedelijk Museum Amsterdam, Amsterdam, Netherlands
	A View of the Harbour, Rotterdam	1856	Thyssen-Bornemisza Museum, Madrid, Spain
	Bateau en Construction en Bord de Canal, Paysage hollandais (Boat under Construction by the Canal, Dutch Landscape)	1857	Petit Palais, Paris, France
	Environs of Breda	1857	Museum of Fine Arts, Houston, Texas, U.S.
	Gezicht op de Ooster Oudehoofdpoort (View of the Ooster Oudehoofdpoort )	1857	Museum Rotterdam, Netherlands
	Windmill near Delft	1857	Unknown
	Molens bij Rotterdam (Windmills near Rotterdam)	1857	Rijksmuseum Twenthe, Enschede, Netherlands
	Jaagpad aan de Trekvliet bij Den Haag	1859	Rijksmuseum Twenthe, Enschede, Netherlands

== 1860s ==
Picture	Title	Year	Current location
	Ansicht von Maassluis (View of Maassluis)	1860	Staatliche Kunsthalle Karlsruhe, Germany
	Ruines du Château de Rosemont; Ruins of Rosemont castle	1861	Musée d'Orsay, Paris, France
	Beach at Ste-Adresse	1862	Phoenix Art Museum, Arizona, U.S.
	Dutch Landscape	1862	Museum of Fine Arts, Houston, Texas, U.S.
	Rotskust bij Sainte-Adresse; Rocky coast at Sainte-Adresse	1862	Rijksmuseum Twenthe, Enschede, Netherlands
	A Roadside Tavern	1863	Art Institute of Chicago, Illinois, U.S.
	Voilier dans le Port de Honfleur; Sailboat in the Port of Honfleur	1863	Private collection
	Entrance to the Port of Honfleur	between 1863 and 1864	Art Institute of Chicago, Illinois, U.S.
	Maannacht bij Overschie	1864	Rijksmuseum Twenthe, Enschede, Netherlands
	The Towpath	1864	National Gallery of Art, Washington DC, U.S.
	Wintergezicht met Schaatsers; Winter Landscape with Skaters	1864	Teylers Museum, Haarlem, Netherlands
	Honfleur	1865	Metropolitan Museum of Art, New York City, U.S.
	Les Patineurs; The Painters	1865	Palais des Beaux-Arts de Lille, France
	The Seine at Bas-Meudon	1865	Cleveland Museum of Art, Ohio, U.S.
	Jaagpad bij Overschie; Towpath near Overschie	1865	Thyssen-Bornemisza Museum, Madrid, Spain
	Quai à Honfleur	1866	Museum of modern art André Malraux - MuMa, Le Havre, France
	Seascape	1866	Unknown
	Rue Nôtre-Dame, Paris	1866	Rijksmuseum, Amsterdam, Netherlands
	The Church of Overschie	1866	Art Institute of Chicago, Illinois, U.S.
	The Inn	1867	Rhode Island School of Design Museum, Providence, Rhode Island, U.S.
	Sunset near Overschie	1867	Museum Boijmans Van Beuningen, Rotterdam, Netherlands
	In Holland, the Boats by the Mill	1868	Musée d'Orsay, Paris, France
	Une rue à Delft, le soir A Street in Delft in the Evening	1868	Petit Palais, Paris, France
	Scene at Delft	1868	Yale University Art Gallery, New Haven, Connecticut, U.S.
	Afbraak van de Rue des Franc-Bourgeois St. Marcel; Demolition work in Rue des Franc-Bourgeois St. Marcel	1868	Kunstmuseum Den Haag, The Hague, Netherlands
	Harbor Scene in Holland	1968	Museum of Fine Arts, Boston, U.S.
	Saint-Parize-le-Châtel	1869	Petit Palais, Paris, France
	Le port de Dordrecht	1869	Dordrechts Museum

== 1870s ==
Picture	Title	Year	Current location
	Harbor by Moonlight	1871	Museum of Fine Arts, Boston, U.S.
	Landschap bij Nevers; Landscape near Nevers	1871	Rijksmuseum, Amsterdam, Netherlands
	Overschie bij Maneschijn; Overschie in the Moonlight	1871	Rijksmuseum, Amsterdam, Netherlands
	Village Street with a Canal	1871	Detroit Institute of Arts, Michigan, U.S.
	Gezicht op Overschie bij Maanlicht; View on Overschie in moonlight	1872	Museum Boijmans Van Beuningen, Rotterdam, Netherlands
	Maannacht	1873	Centraal Museum, Utrecht, Netherlands
	Maannacht	1873	Centraal Museum, Utrecht, Netherlands
	Stadsgezicht Rotterdam: Canal à Rotterdam; Cityscape Rotterdam: Canal à Rotterdam	1873	Museum Rotterdam, Netherlands
	La maison du maître Adam Billaud à Nevers; The House of Master Adam Billaud at Nevers	1874	Stedelijk Museum Amsterdam, Netherlands
	Paris, le pont Marie et le quai des Célestins	1874	Museum of modern art André Malraux - MuMa, Le Havre, France
	Huizen aan een vaart bij Crooswijk; Houses along a Canal near Crooswijk	1874	Rijksmuseum, Amsterdam, Netherlands
	The Port of Honfleur	1875	Yale University Art Gallery, New Haven, Connecticut, U.S.
	View of Lake Léman at Nyon	1875	Minneapolis Institute of Art, Minnesota, U.S.
	Fishing Boat	1878	Art Institute of Chicago, Illinois, U.S.
	River Scene	1860–1880	National Gallery, London, England
	Barges	before 1891	Museo Municipal de Bellas Artes de Valparaíso, Chile

== 1880s ==
Picture	Title	Year	Current location
	La Ciotat	1880	Museum Boijmans Van Beuningen, Rotterdam, Netherlands
	Rotterdam bij Maneschijn; Rotterdam in the Moonlight	1881	Rijksmuseum, Amsterdam, Netherlands
	Seascape	1886	Museo Nacional de Bellas Artes de La Habana, Cuba

== Unknown date ==
Picture	Title	Year	Current location
	Landschaft; Landscape	2nd third of 19th century	Private collection
	Krajobraz z Wiatrakiem; Landscape with a Windmill	2nd half of 19th century	National Museum, Kraków, Poland
