= Kehrenbach =

Kehrenbach may refer to:

- Kehrenbach, Melsungen, a district of the town Melsungen in Hesse, Germany
- Kehrenbach (Fulda), a river of Hesse, Germany, tributary of the Fulda
