= Grimme (disambiguation) =

Grimme may refer to:

- Grimme, village in Saxony-Anhalt
- Grimme Award

== People ==
- Adolf Grimme, German politician
- Arnold Grimme, German veterinarian and naturalist
- Friedrich Wilhelm Grimme, German writer
- Leopold Grimme, Austrian footballer
- Matthias T. J. Grimme, German author
- Stefan Grimme, German chemist
