= Johannes Rhenanus =

German theologian

Johannes Rhenanus (about 1528 in Melsungen – April 29, 1589, in Allendorf in den Sooden, actually Johann Rheinlandt) was a German salinist, theologian, alchemist, printer and author.

== Life ==
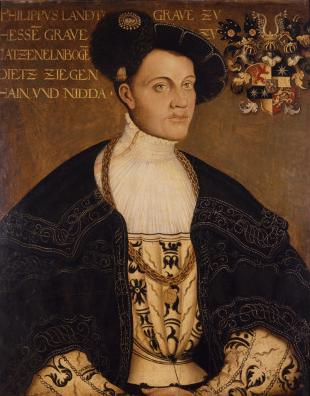
Philip of Hesse

From 1548, Johannes Rhenanus studied theology in Marburg, in 1553 he was ordained by Adam Krafft, the reformer of Hessen. Between 1553 and 1554 he worked as a second pastor in his hometown. At Pentecost in 1555 Landgrave Philipp transferred him to Allendorf in Sooden. Meanwhile, he called himself no longer Rheinlandt but Latinized his name (according to the customs of former scholars) to Johannes Rhenanus. In 1566, he married Catharina Brown († 1586), daughter of the rent writer Jost Braun von Melsungen. They had five children. His second marriage was with Catherine Schott, née von Lowenstein.

He should not be confused with John Rhenanus, his grandson, who was the doctor of Landgraf Moritz of Hessen-Kassel. He received his doctorate in 1610 in Marburg from Johannes Hartmann. In the 17th century, he became the author and editor of alchemical texts. He was the son of Dr. Martin Rhenanus and was born in Kassel.

== Working as Salinist ==
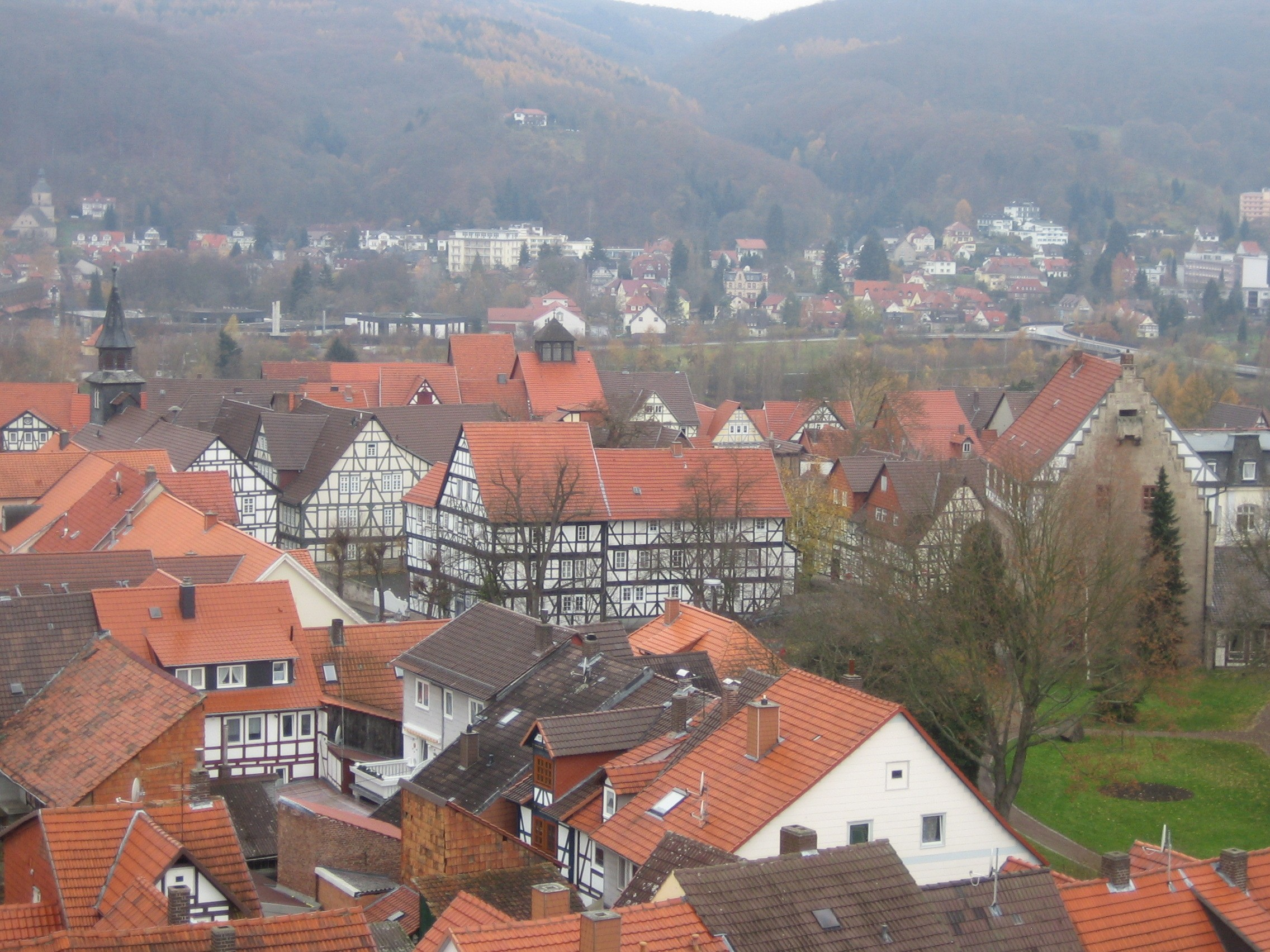
View over Bad Sooden-Allendorf, earlier called Allendorf in the Soden

Although his new workplace in Allendorf in the Soden, lived already several hundred years from the salt production, which has been boiled from local salt springs, however, now saline was in a crisis. Although more and more salt was needed, the production could not just be increased, due to the "Siedehütten" (boiling huts where the salt was boiled/produced in pans). They were in poor condition and the forests that provided the firewood, was devastated. On the other hand, the Pfännerschaft was interested to drive the already high salt prices further up. To do so, they concealed the knowledge of a new sole vein. To improve the situation, Philipp I. built 43 new Siedehütten with one pan each. The 42 pans of the Pfännerschaft now had to face the new improvements. The cooperation between public and private Siedehütten proved to be difficult. It seemed to be impossible to arrive at a uniform fixed salt price. To counteract this, Philip I. leased all the pans, the partnerships and their forests, in 1540. In only a few years under his supervision, the Saline production was back into profit again.

Philip I, found in Rhenanus, a capable man, to further promote the Saline production and also introduce new production methods. In 1559, he appointed him as the Salzgreben and entrusted him against the resistance of Pfännerschaft, with the supervision of the important timber industry. In 1561, he also received the co-supervision over the salt production to improve the outdated ways of working lastingly. Rhenanus had his own Siedehütte set up for his experiments. Here he could boil 140 pans of salt per year while the other Siedehütte only managed 90 to 95 pans over the same time, with their rather conventional production method.

== The "New Saltzbuch" ==
Philip I. had already the idea for it, but it was only his successor, William IV. who commanded Rhenanus to write down his knowledge of the salt production in the "New Saltzbuch". However, the Landgraf admonished Rhenanus and his co-author and Co-Salzgreben Christoph Homberg not to give up the work in favour of debauchery. Nonetheless, now and then the Landgraf sent the occasional wine barrel from the court cellars over to Soden.

After almost 20 years of work, the "New Saltzbuch" (now called "Salt Bible") was finished. The work covers 2000 pages in five volumes, with four annexes and some miscellanies. The original is in the Library of the Mining Office in Clausthal-Zellerfeld; this is a contemporary copy of the library of the University of Kassel. In the Salt Museum in Bad Soden-Allendorf, another copy is on display.

== Introduction of brown coal ==
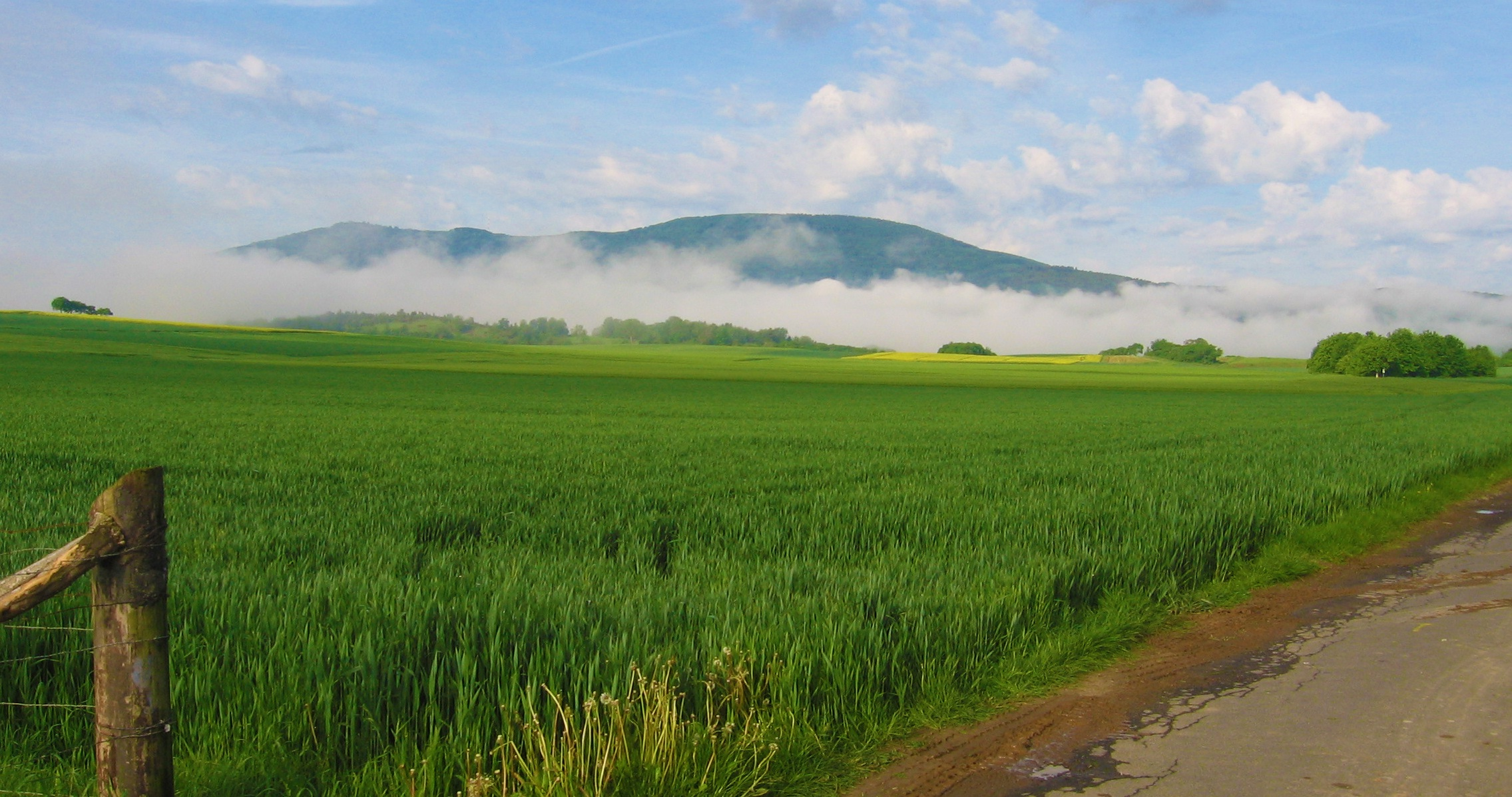
View from southwest to the Hoher Meissner

To solve the problem of energy shortage after the deforestation in the area, Rhenanus experimented with brown coal beginning in 1563, which was discovered a few years earlier in the area of the nearby mountain "Hoher Meissner". He could use higher flame temperatures by putting the boiling pans, which so far, hung over an open fire, on a grill of bricks. In 1575, William IV allowed him to drive a tunnel in the Hoher Meissner hillside of Schwalbental, to explore further the coal deposits on. Financed by the proceeds of Saline Soden, this was Germany's first brown coal mine. Despite initial success with the brown coal firing, Rhenanus was still not satisfied. The brown coal burned worse than the charcoal, whose technology was better known. Wilhelm IV. responded to complaints of the Pfännerschaft and threatened with salary cuts. However, Rhenanus was so convinced of his ideas that he answered the Landgraf that from now on he would pay for the additional experiments himself. He managed to increase the firing temperature of the coal further by putting a chimney on his stove. This invention made history as the "Allendorf Wind oven". Also, he took the heat of the exhaust gases in the chimney to dry the salt, which to prevent weight falsifications could only be sold in dry conditions. The coal production capacity of Saline increased in a short time by more than 20%. It did not take long, and other salt works began to fire up their pans with coal.

== Improving Ross Art ==
Rhenanus also worked on improving the Ross Art (The technique by which brine was pumped from the earth) Since 1560. He recognized the shortcomings of the Goepel plant, a conveyor system, which was driven by two horses and developed its pumping station, which for centuries was in use in other places as well.

== Further research ==
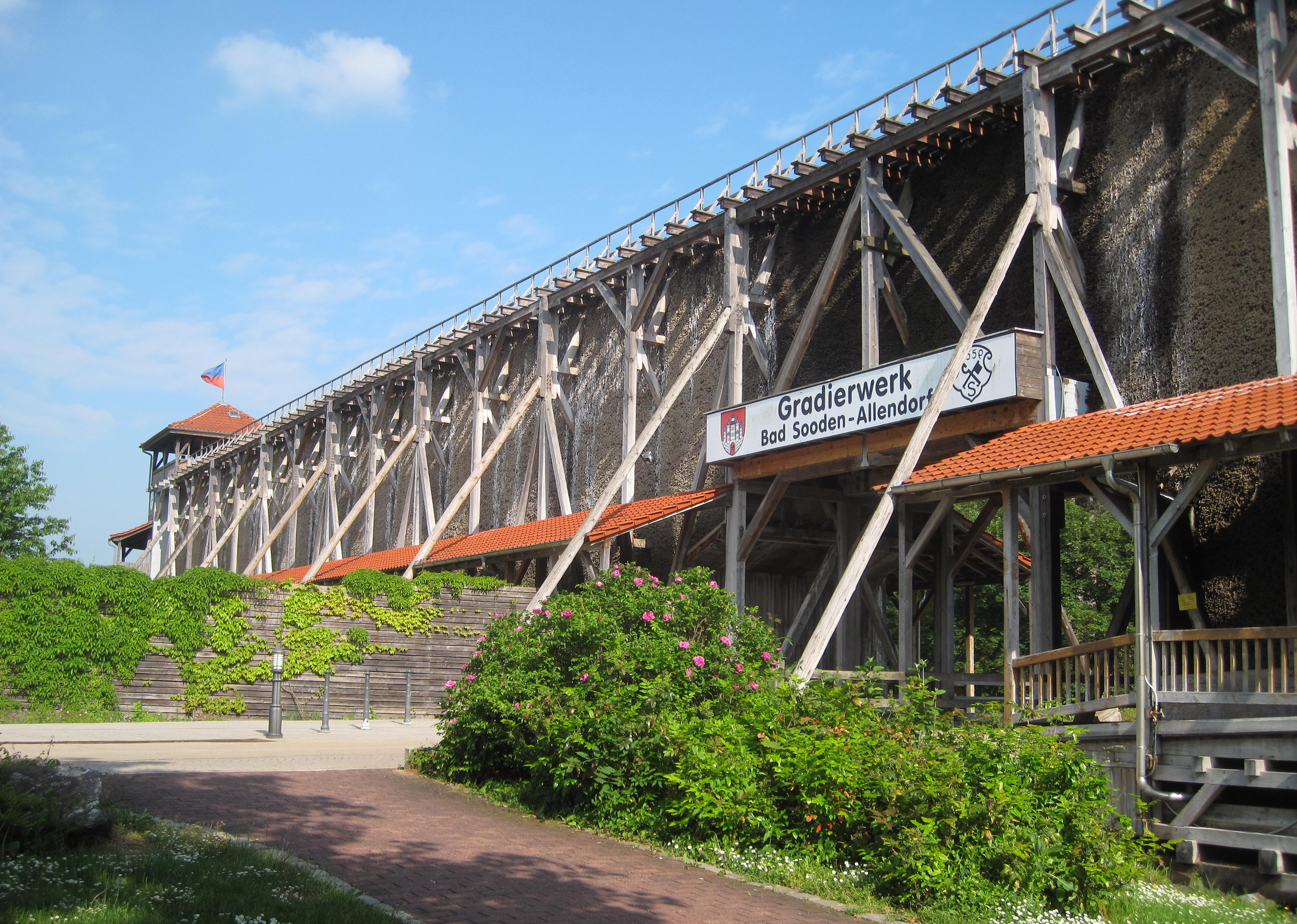
Graduation tower

After the successes in Soden, they introduce the brown coal firing in other industries as well. For example in glassworks. However, this was only possible with desulfurized coal. Rhenanus was also involved in the development of the coking of brown coal. This made the burning of limestone and the smelting of copper possible. Other energy-intensive industries could now be converted to brown coal firing. By replacing fossil fuels by renewable energyRhenanus anticipated an element of the industrial revolution. As a specialist in technology, he enjoyed such a reputation that foreign Princes asked for his opinion. From 1567 on, he made numerous trips; including Braunschweig, Lüneburg, Thuringia and Saxony. In 1584, his ruler allowed him a several months long trip to Pomerania, where he was to investigate a new salt vein. He visited numerous salt mines, iron ore huts and gravel works and also wrote a travel description, which is preserved to the very day.

== Illness, death and his descendants ==
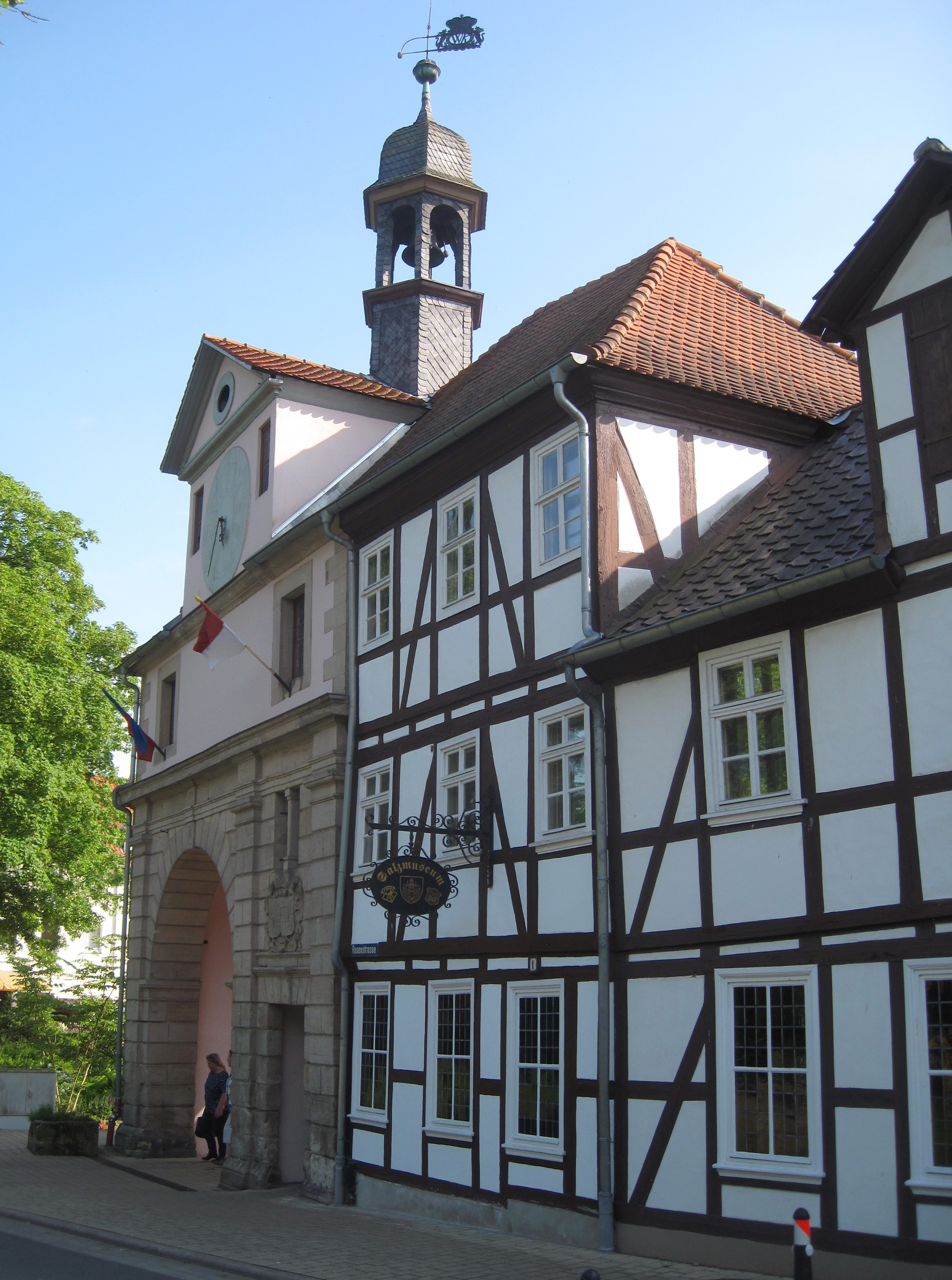
Salt museum

In 1589, Rhenanus got gravely ill. He sent an empty wine barrel to William IV and asked to fill it up with the best "drop" of the court cellar; it will probably be the last wine he would ever drink again. Shortly after, he died and was buried in the St. Mary's Church to Sooden. Rhenanus left a debt of 993 Gulden, which was roughly the equivalent to three years' salary. The Landgraf appeared generous and paid the outstanding debt. Rhenanus' son Martin was a doctor of medicine and practiced as such in the neighbouring town of Eschwege. His homonymous grandson, John Rhenanus, following his grandfather's footsteps was also an alchemist and the physician to the Landgraf Moritz the Scholar.

== Afterlife ==
The salt history of the city and memories of Johannes Rhenanus can be seen in the salt museum. In Bad Sooden-Allendorf, there is not only a Rhenanus-school, but also a Rhenanusplatz and Rhenanushaus (Municipal House of the Protestant parish of St. Mary). For the annual Brunnenfest, Rhenanus is embodied by a pastor in traditional costumes of his time, presented, next to the mayor, who represents the Landgraf.

So far, there is no known portrait of Rhenanus. It is only reported that he was overweight, but at the same time a sporty wanderer.

It was not until 1601 that the first graduation towers were erected – a few years after the death of Rhenanus. It is, however, reported that he has already seen such buildings.
