= B. Braun =

German medical and pharmaceutical device company

B. Braun Melsungen SE
- Type: Societas Europaea
- Industry: Healthcare
- Founded: 1839; 187 years ago
- Founder: Julius Wilhelm Braun
- Headquarters: Melsungen, Germany
- Key people: Anna Maria Braun (CEO)
- Revenue: ▲€ 8,755 million (2023)
- Owner: Private
- Number of employees: ▼63,011 (2023)
- Website: www.bbraun.com

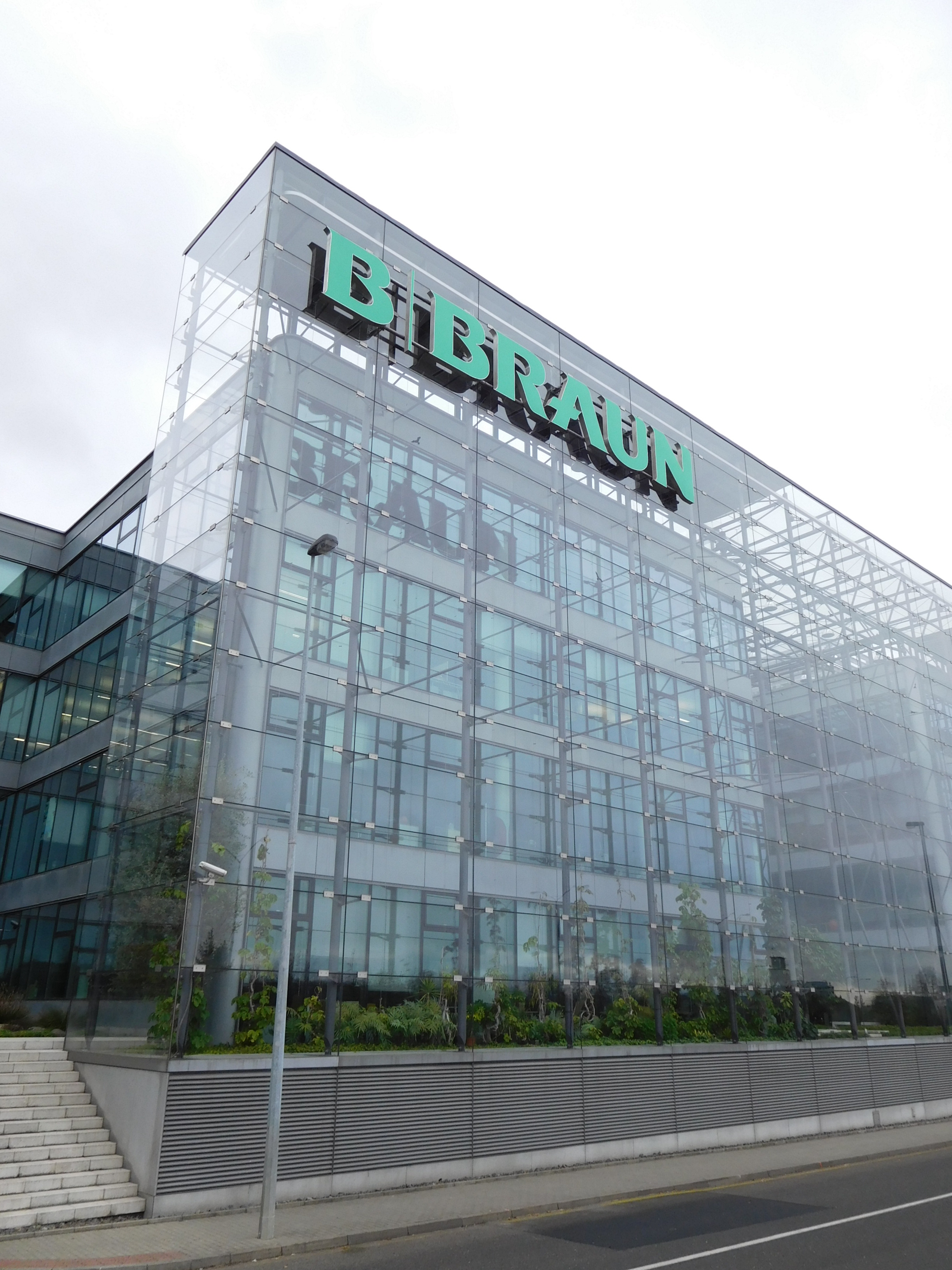
B. Braun offices in Prague.

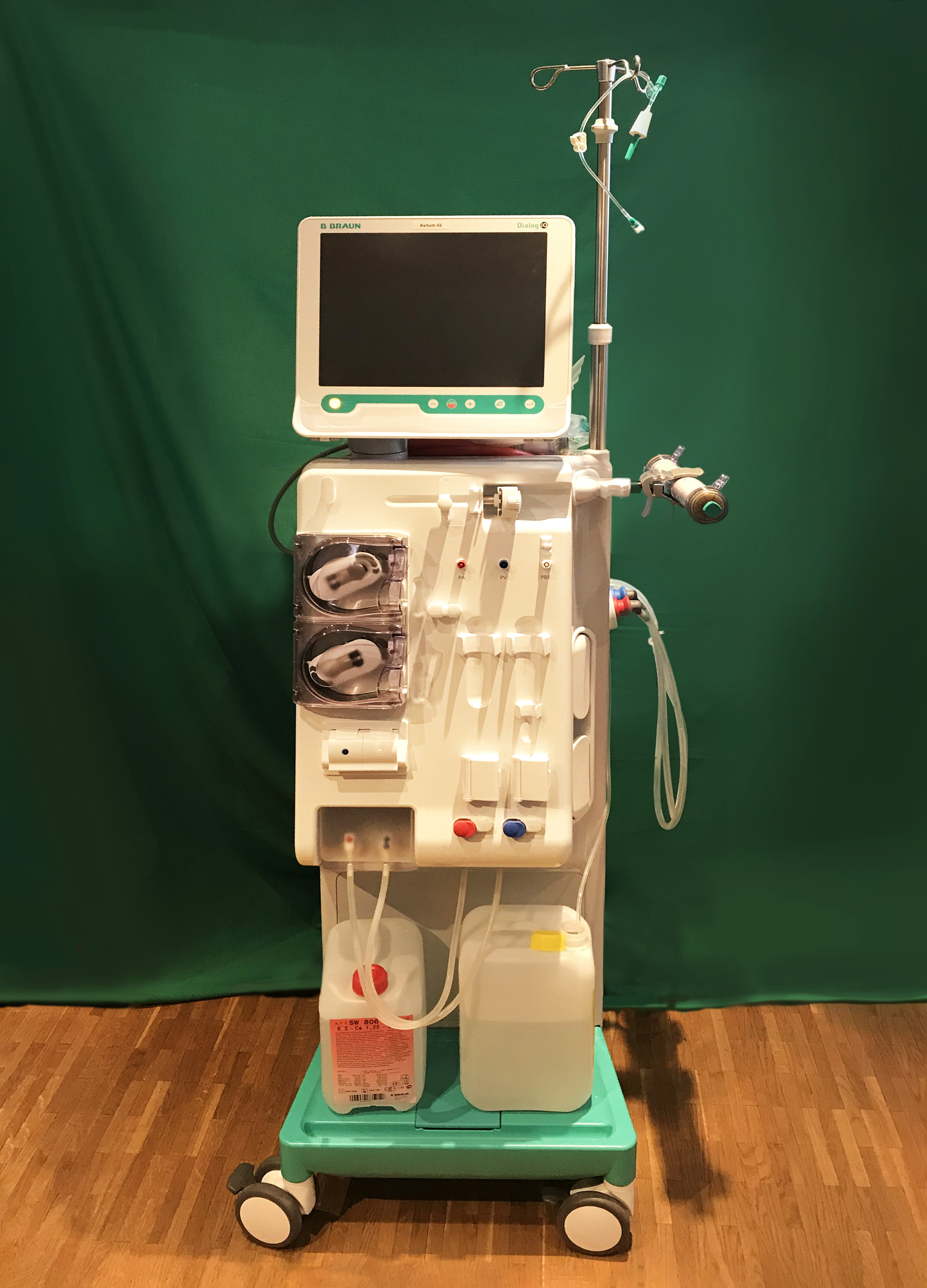
Dialog dialysis machine from B. Braun

B. Braun is a German medical and pharmaceutical device company with more than 63,000 employees globally, and offices and production facilities in more than 60 countries. Its headquarters are located in Melsungen, in central Germany. The company was founded in 1839 and is still owned by the Braun family.

B. Braun has more than 5,000 different healthcare products, of which 95% are manufactured by the company. In 2018, the company had a revenue of 6.908 Billion Euros.

== History ==
The company began in 1839 as a pharmacy in Melsungen, where it started to sell medical herbs by mail to customers in Germany.

Later, a manufacturing plant was built, where production of several medical products began, mainly surgical sutures. With this product, Braun started to supply to hospitals, and added in the following decades other product lines to its manufacturing program, like intravenous solutions, monitoring apparatus and other medical devices. In the 1960s, Braun became highly specialised in plastics for pharmaceutical and medical uses, and developed the first plastic container for I. V. solutions in 1956, as well as many other products for patient care in hospitals.

As the company grew, manufacturing facilities were acquired or established in the United Kingdom, France, Italy, Spain, Switzerland, Hungary, Slovakia, Czech Republic, the United States, Brazil and Malaysia. B. Braun acquired Aesculap AG, a Germany-based manufacturer of surgical instruments. B. Braun and its subsidiaries employ more than 54,000 people in more than 60 countries as of 2014.

In 1969, the company introduced Lyodura. Similar products from other manufacturers were removed from the market in the USA and Canada in 2002. In the same year, B. Braun Melsungen agreed with the Japanese health authorities to pay compensation to the families of the victims of over $600,000 each.

In 2009, the company was named the best company in Germany to work for.

In February 2012, the company announced that it was no longer passing on human insulin. In the same year, B. Braun came into the market for genetic diagnostics with a participation in Tübinger Cegat GmbH.

From 2012 to 2013, B. Braun increased its share in Rhön-Klinikum from 5 to 18 percent in order secure a minority blocking stake in the company; it also won antitrust approval for raising its stake to 25 percent. Together with another shareholder, hospitals operator Asklepios Kliniken, it opposed a takeover by Fresenius. In late 2013, B. Braun filed a lawsuit to contest the sale of most of Rhön-Klinikum’s hospitals, which accounted for about two-thirds of the company’s revenues. After that sale was completed, B. Braun reduced its share.

In 2013, B. Braun opened a day and seminar center in the Haydau monastery complex in Morschen.

In 2017, B. Braun and Philips entered into an alliance in the field of ultrasound-guided regional anesthesia. In 2018, B. Braun opened a new production facility for dialyzers in Wilsdruff, Saxony.

== Controversies ==
In 1969, B. Braun released Lyodura, a graft product used in neurosurgery as a patch material on the brain. The grafts were harvested from donor cadavers and have been shown to transmit Creutzfeldt–Jakob disease (CJD), an incurable and inevitably fatal degenerative neurological disorder. Additionally, Lyodura was harvested through black-market cadavers, meaning that donor grafts lacked patient histories. At least 154 people have been diagnosed with CJD due to Lyodura.

As of December 2024, B. Braun continues its operations in Russia. According to data from the Leave Russia project, B. Braun's Russian subsidiary reported revenues of approximately $291 million and employed 1,362 staff members in 2021. Despite the ongoing conflict and international calls for companies to exit the Russian market, B. Braun has maintained its business activities in the country.

== Divisions ==
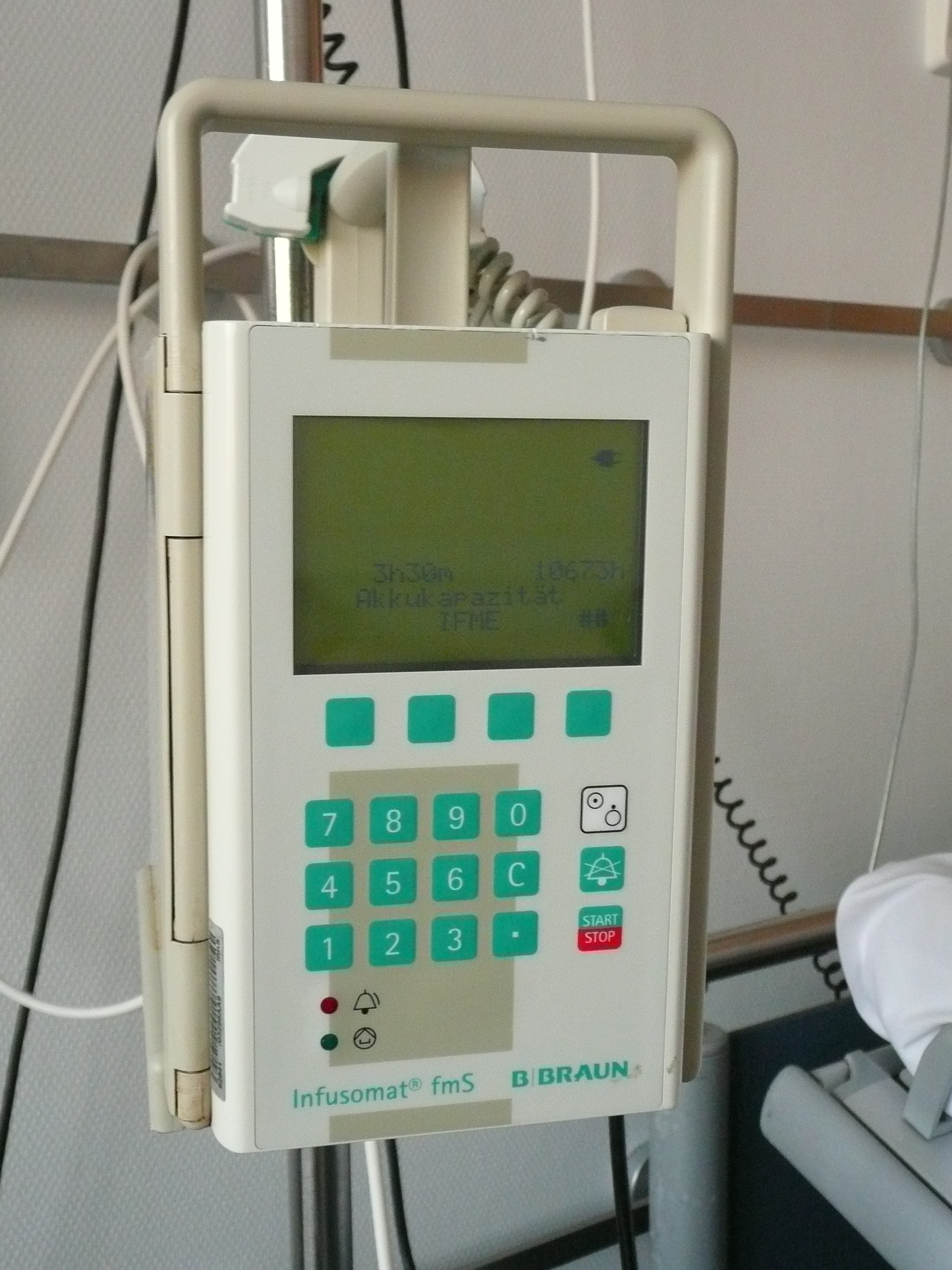
B.Braun Infusomat fmS

On an international level, B. Braun is separated into several divisions:

- Hospital Care Division, which handles products related to infusion and injection and other disposable hospital supplies.
- Aesculap Division, which handles products and services related to surgery.
- OPM (Out Patient Market) Division
- B. Braun Avitum Division which handles products and services related to extracorporeal blood treatment.
- TransCare, a home healthcare service operating in Germany, Austria, and the United Kingdom.
- B. Braun Sterilog, a service based in the United Kingdom for the cleaning, decontamination and sterilising of surgical instruments. Sterilog facilities are located in Pudsey, Yardley Green and King's Norton.

The United Kingdom headquarters are located in Chapeltown, just north of Sheffield in South Yorkshire. The United States headquarters are located in Bethlehem, Pennsylvania, where the subsidiary company is known as B. Braun Medical, Inc. It sells pharmaceutical and medical products.

=== Aesculap ===
B. Braun's Aesculap division, (/æsˈkliːp/), which includes Aesculap, Inc., its American unit, is a manufacturer of surgical equipment. It derives its name from Aesculapius, the Greek and Roman god of medicine and physicians. It manufactures a range of equipment including sutures, handheld surgical instruments, implants, and electrosurgical devices and powers systems. During the Second World War they produced tattoo stamps used in German extermination camps. They also provide training to healthcare workers through its Aesculap Academy.

Aesculap was founded in 1867 in Tuttlingen, Germany by Gottfried Jetter.

Aesculap, Inc., its American division, was founded in 1977 in Center Valley, Pennsylvania. Aesculap AG was incorporated into the B. Braun Group in 1998.

== Legal issues ==
In 2010, B. Braun Medical, a unit of B. Braun, agreed to pay $14.7 million for causing the Medicaid program in the US to pay inflated amounts on dozens of its products.
