= Anna Maria Braun =

German business executive (born 1979)

- Born: 3 July 1979 (age 47); Melsungen, Hesse, West Germany
- Education: Georgetown University
- Occupation: Business executive
- Title: CEO, B. Braun Melsungen
- Spouse: married
- Children: 3
- Parent: Ludwig Georg Braun

Anna Maria Braun (born 3 July 1979) is a German businesswoman and lawyer. Since 2019, she has been managing the family business B. Braun in the sixth generation as CEO. She holds 10% of the company's shares.

== Early life and education ==
Braun was born in Melsungen, one of five children of Ludwig Georg Braun. She graduated from United World College of the Atlantic (UWC) and completed a one-year intensive language course in Chinese at the Beijing Language and Culture University. She studied law at Georgetown University in Washington, D.C., with a Master of Laws degree.

== Career ==
From 2007 to 2009, Braun worked as lawyer at the Düsseldorf office of CMS.

In 2009, Braun joined the family business. Before her position as CEO, she headed the subsidiary B. Braun Medical Industries in Malaysia in 2013. By 2016, she was on the board of B. Braun Melsungen AG responsible for the Asia-Pacific operations where she also is president.

== Other activities ==
=== Corporate boards ===
- Freudenberg Group, Member of the Supervisory Board (since 2022)
- Oetker Group, Member of the Advisory Board (since 2019)

=== Non-profit organizations ===
- Bertelsmann Stiftung, Member of the Board of Trustees (since 2024)
- Robert Koch Foundation, Member of the Board of Trustees

== Personal life ==
Braun is married and has three children.
