= View from the Quai d'Orsay =

1854 painting by Johan Barthold Jongkind

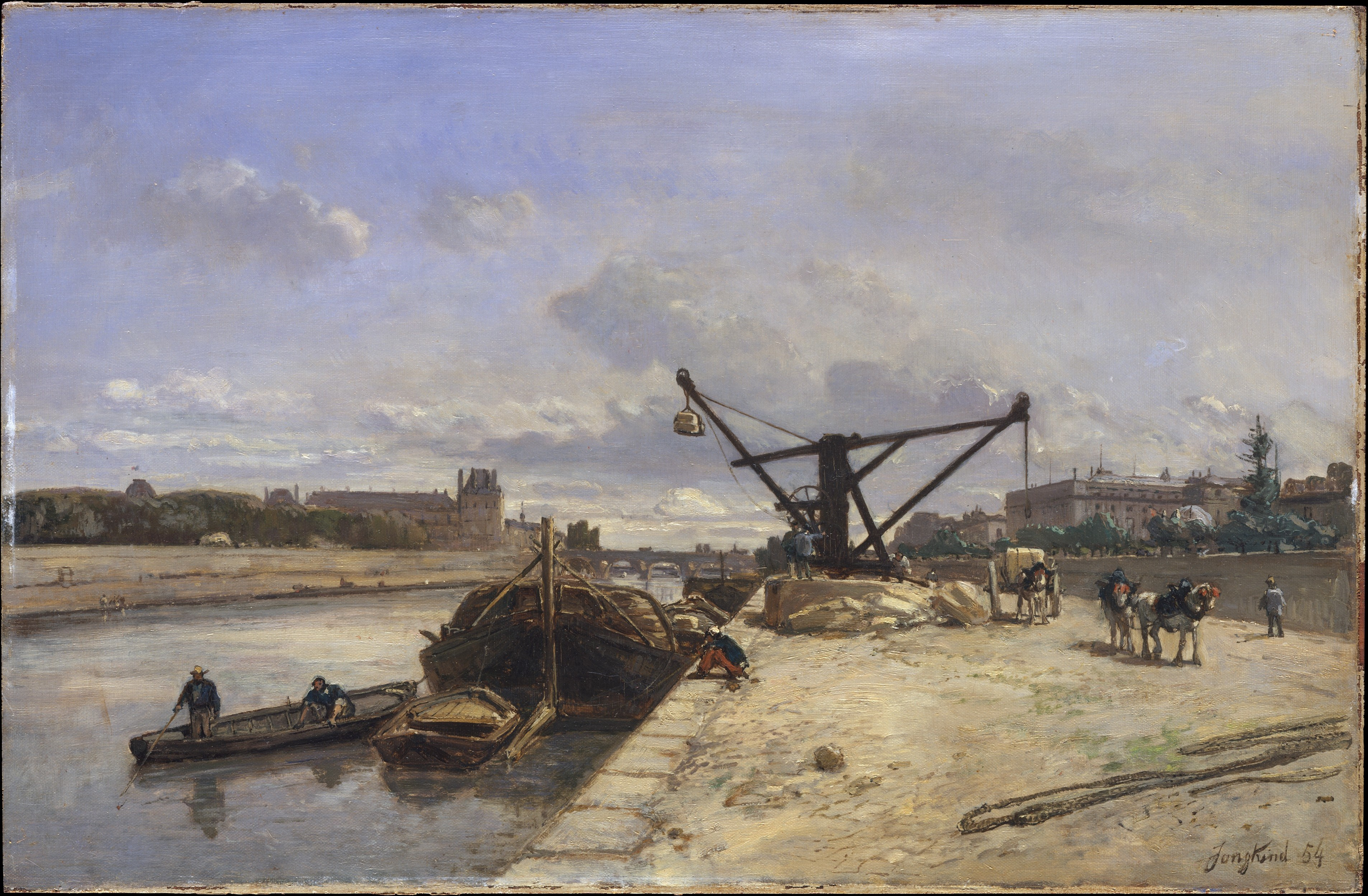
- Artist: Johan Barthold Jongkind
- Year: 1854
- Medium: Oil on canvas
- Dimensions: 43.8 cm × 66 cm (17.2 in × 26 in)
- Location: Metropolitan Museum of Art; New York City

View from the Quai d'Orsay is a mid-19th century painting by the Dutch artist Johan Barthold Jongkind. Executed in oils on canvas, the painting is currently in the collection of the Metropolitan Museum of Art.

== Description ==
The painting depicts the Quai d'Orsay on the left bank of the River Seine. Jongkind rendered the Seine as a place of industrial activity, featuring cranes, barges, rowboats, and animals. Further down the river, Parisian structures are visible, under a sky.
