= Lattrop =

- village
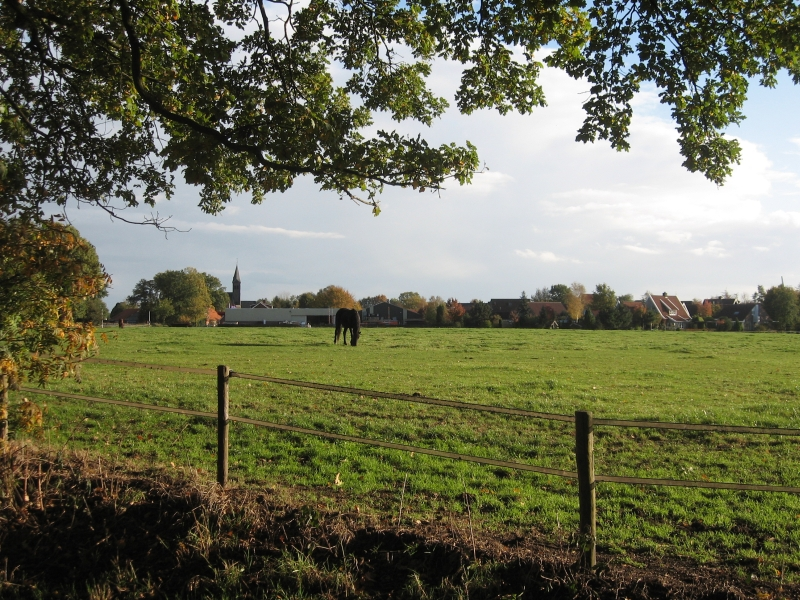
- View on Lattrop
- Nickname: Droadneagels
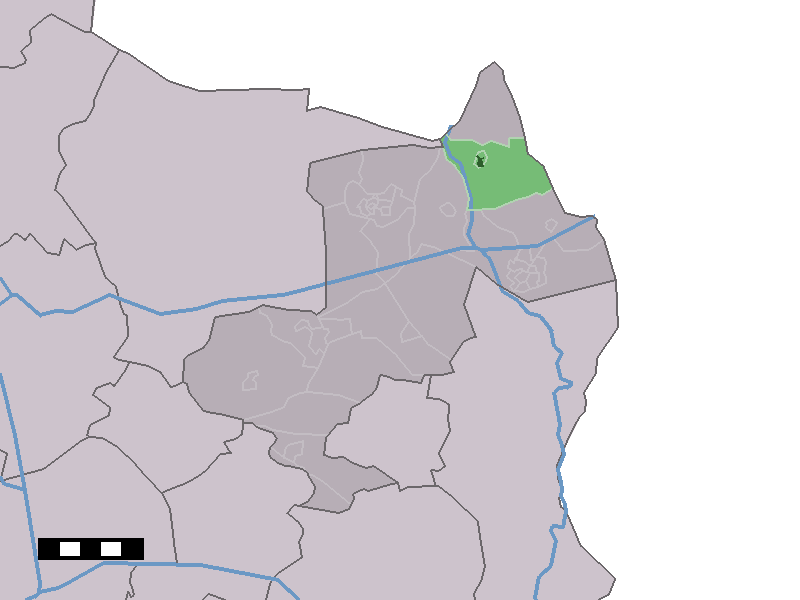
- The village centre (dark green) and the statistical district (light green) of Lattrop in the municipality of Dinkelland.

- Location in the Netherlands Lattrop (Netherlands)
- Coordinates: 52°25′40″N 6°58′31″E
- Country: Netherlands
- Province: Overijssel
- Municipality: Dinkelland

Area
  - Total: 10.90 km^{2} (4.21 sq mi)
- Elevation: 19 m (62 ft)

Population
  - Total: 810
  - Density: 74/km^{2} (190/sq mi)
- Demonym: Lattroppers
- Time zone: UTC+1 (CET)
  - Summer (DST): UTC+2 (CEST)
- Postal code: 7635
- Dialing code: 0541

Lattrop is a village in the Dutch province of Overijssel. It is a part of the municipality of Dinkelland, and lies about 13 km north of Oldenzaal.

== Overview ==
It was first mentioned in 1272 as Lattorpe, and means "village of Læta (partially unfree farmer)". In 1840, it was home to 516 people. The postal authorities have placed Lattrop and Breklenkamp into a single entity called "Lattrop-Breklenkamp". however both still have their own place name signs.

The Oortmanmolen is a windmill from 1910 which has been restored in 1983.

The Cosmos Sterrenwacht is an observatory which started in the garden of Hennie Gosemeijer as a hobby. In 1964, Gosemeijer became an official satellite observer for NASA. His observatory received many visitors, and in 1974, it became a public observatory. The Astro Theater, a planetarium was later added to the observatory.

== Born in Lattrop ==
- Johan Barthold Jongkind (1819–1891), painter
- Marga Bult (b. 1956), singer and presenter

== Gallery ==
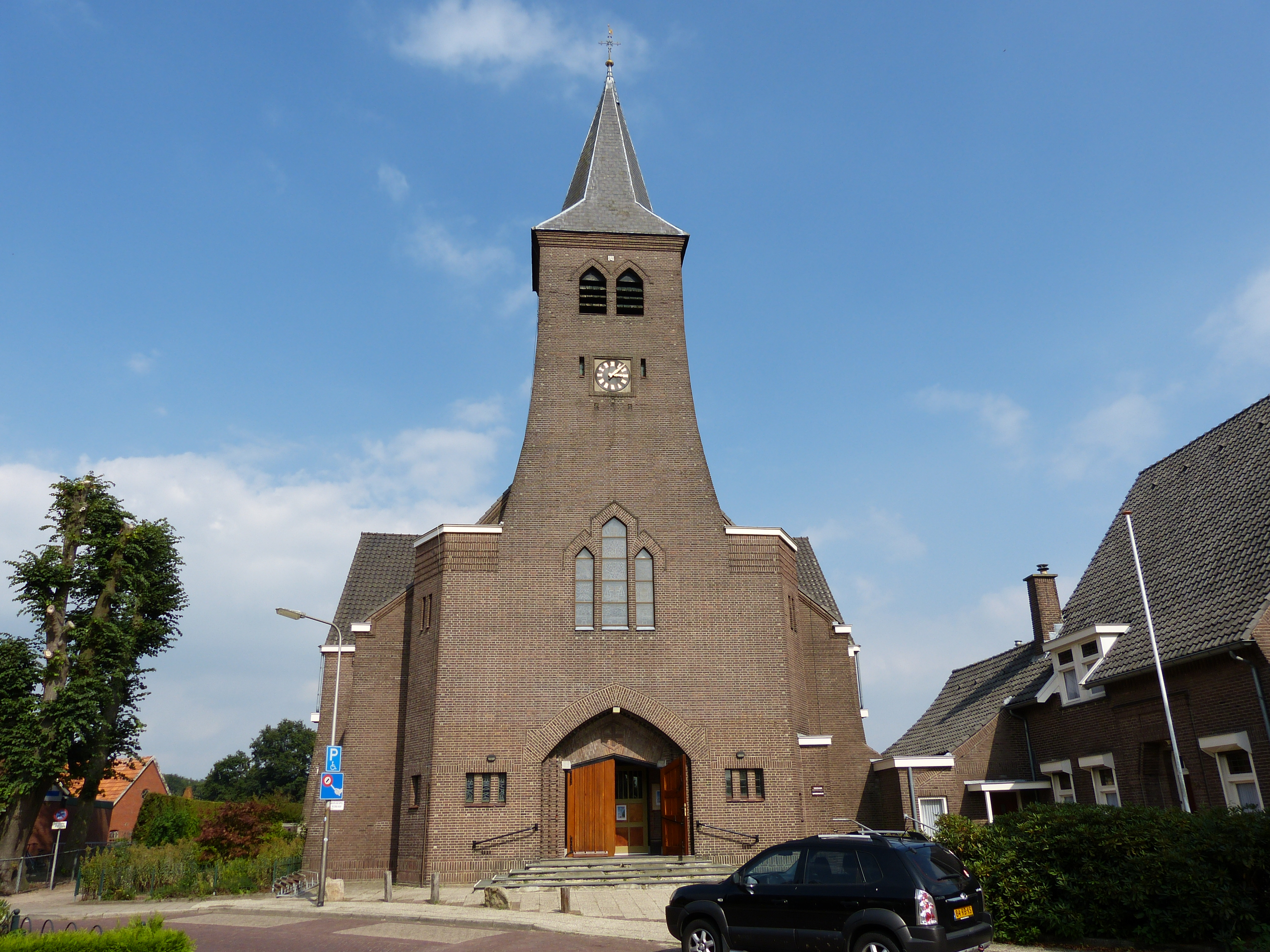
Simon and Judas Church

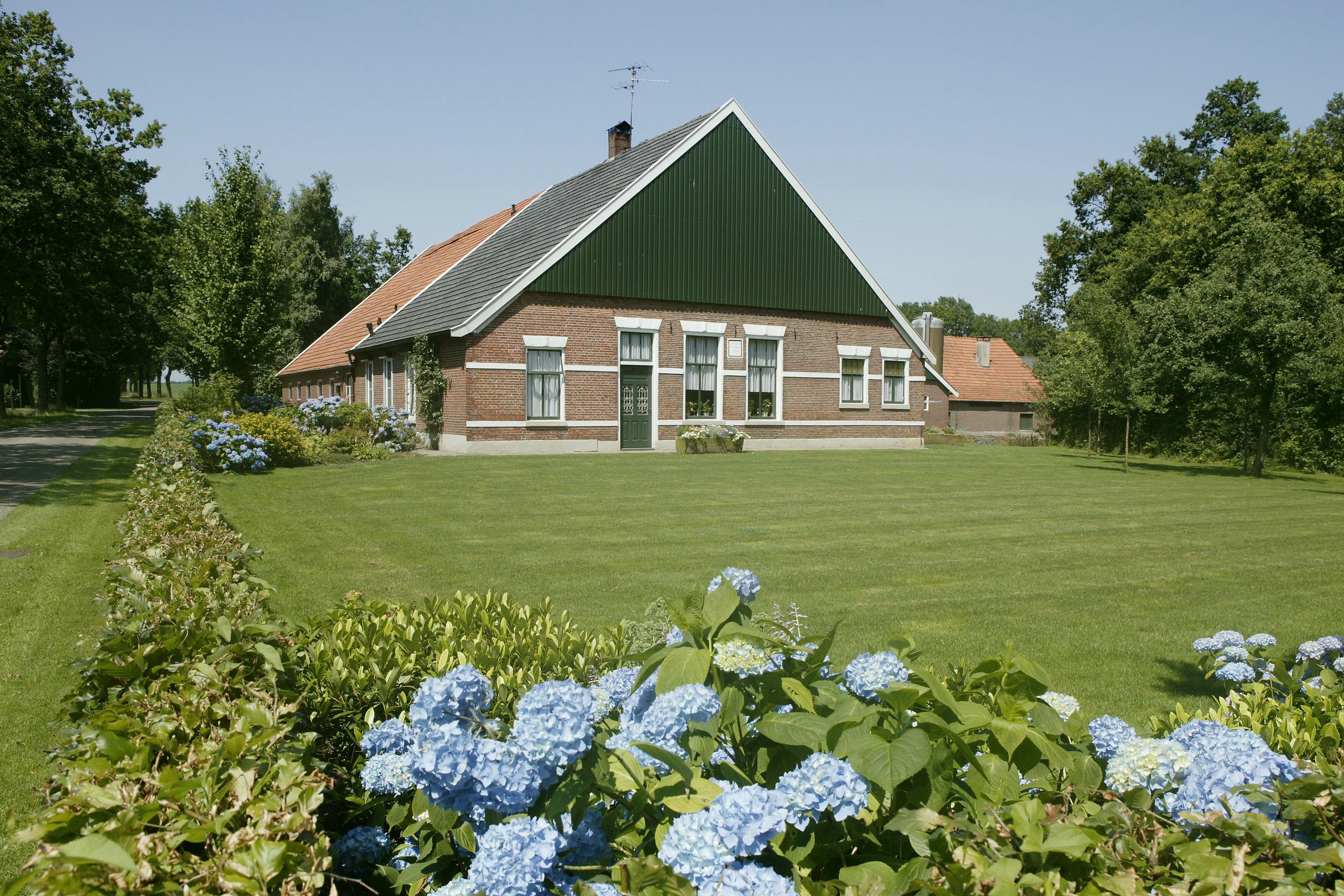
Farm in Lattrop

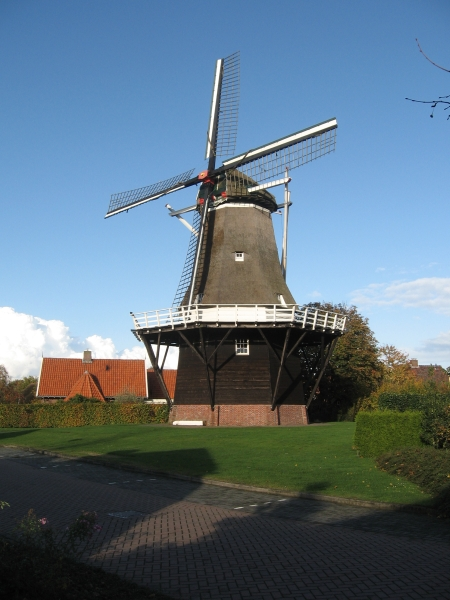
Windmill Ortmanmolen

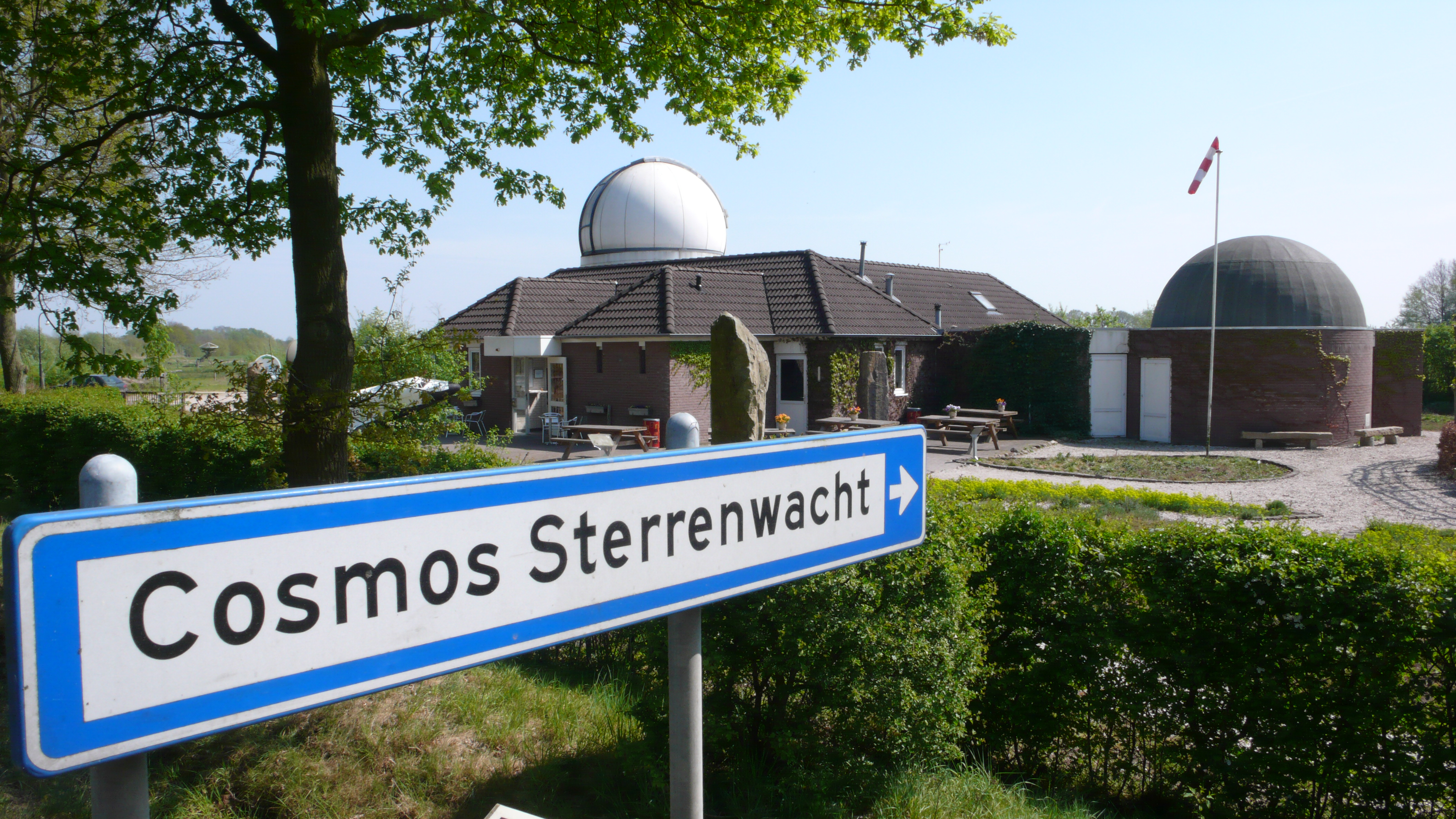
Cosmos observatory
