= Kehrenbach (Fulda) =

River in Germany

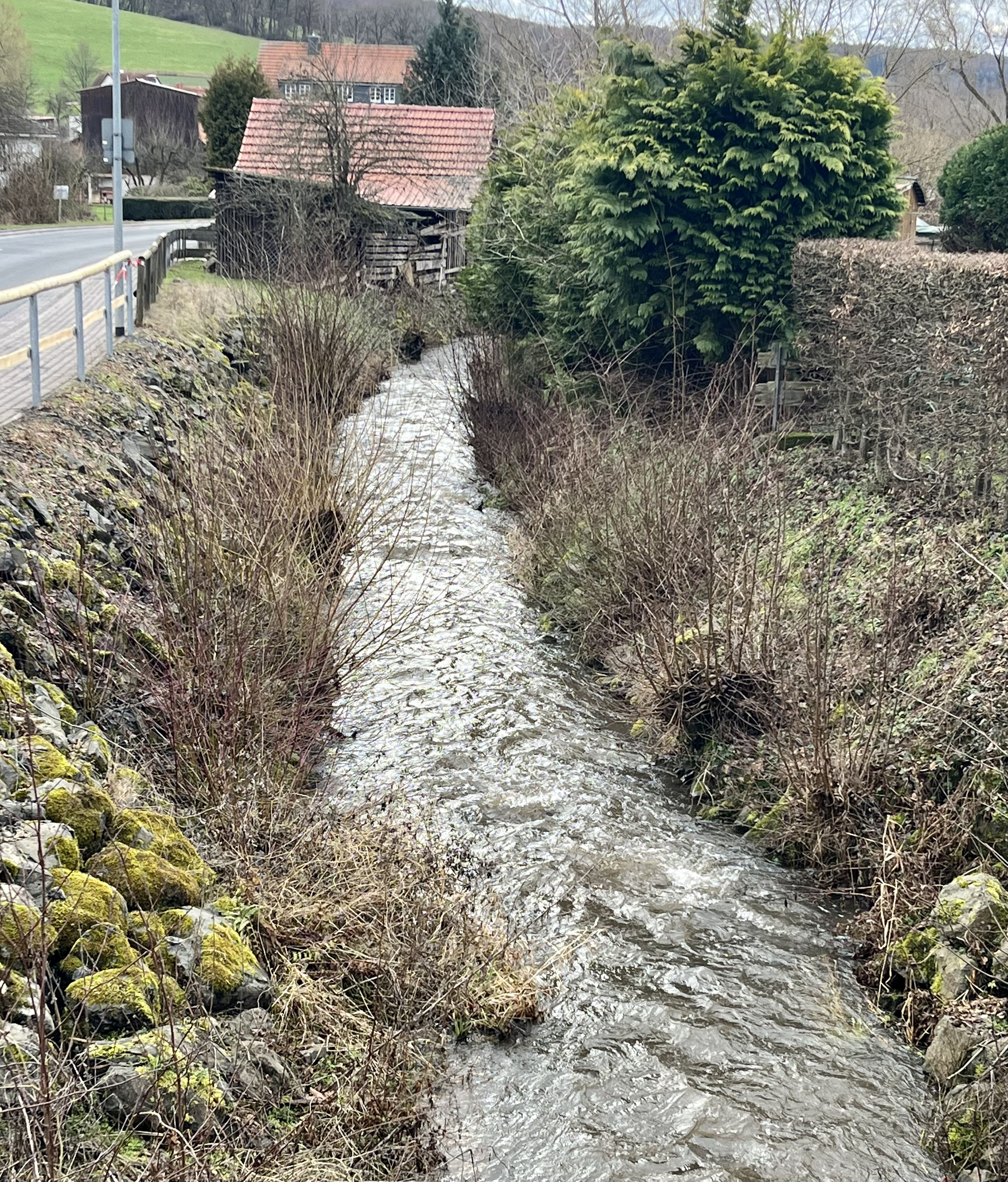
- Kehrenbach at Kirchhof

Location
- Country: Germany
- State: Hesse

Physical characteristics
- Mouth
  - location: Fulda
  - coordinates: 51.1317°N 9.5480°E
- Length: 12.1 km (7.5 mi)

Basin features
- Progression: Fulda→ Weser→ North Sea

Kehrenbach is a river of Hesse, Germany. It is called Salmsbach in its upper course and flows into the Fulda in Melsungen. It is a roughly 12 km (7.5 mi) long right tributary of the Fulda in the Schwalm-Eder district of northern Hesse. Its drainage basin covers 36.228 km^{2} (13.988 mi^{2}). The river rises in the Melsunger Bergland and flows through the villages of Kehrenbach and Kirchhof before joining the Fulda at Melsungen.

== See also ==
- List of rivers of Hesse
