= Johan Jongkind =

Dutch painter and printmaker

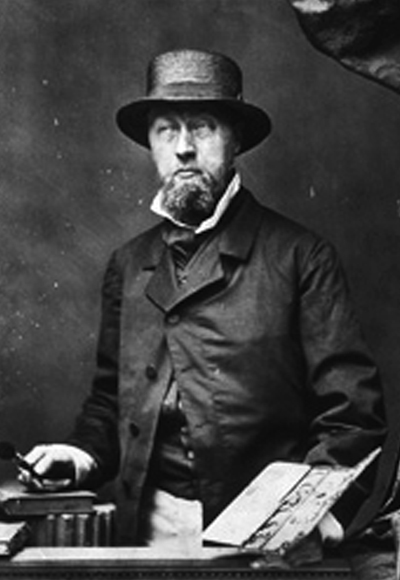
- Born: 3 June 1819; Lattrop, Netherlands
- Died: 9 February 1891 (aged 71); Saint-Égrève, France
- Known for: marine landscapes
- Movement: forerunner of Impressionism

Johan Barthold Jongkind (Dutch pronunciation: [ˈjoːɦɑn ˈbɑrtɔlt ˈjɔŋkɪnt]; 3 June 1819 – 9 February 1891) was a Dutch painter and printmaker. He painted marine landscapes in a free manner and is regarded as a forerunner of impressionism.

== Career ==
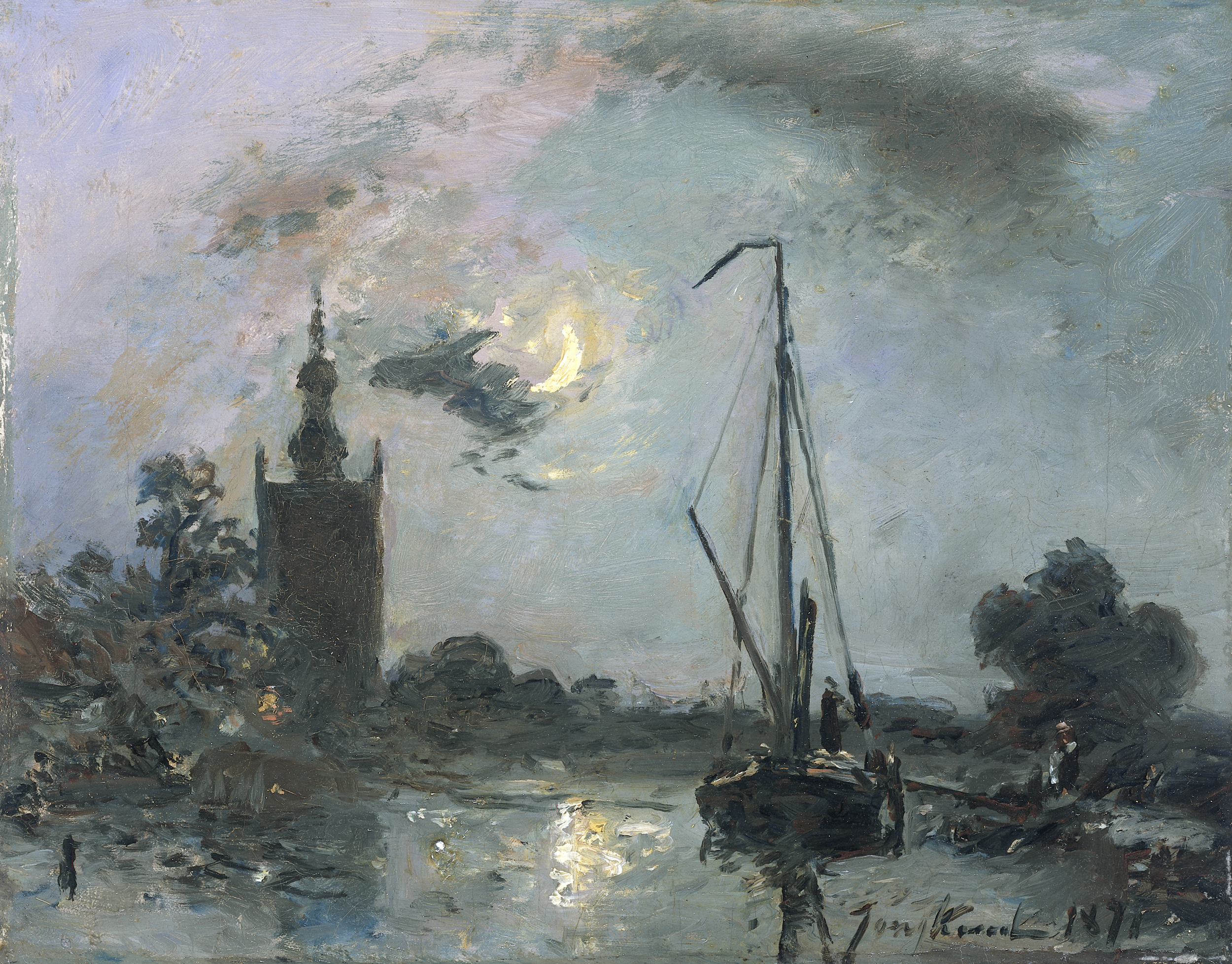
Overschie in the Moonlight, 1871, Rijksmuseum, Amsterdam

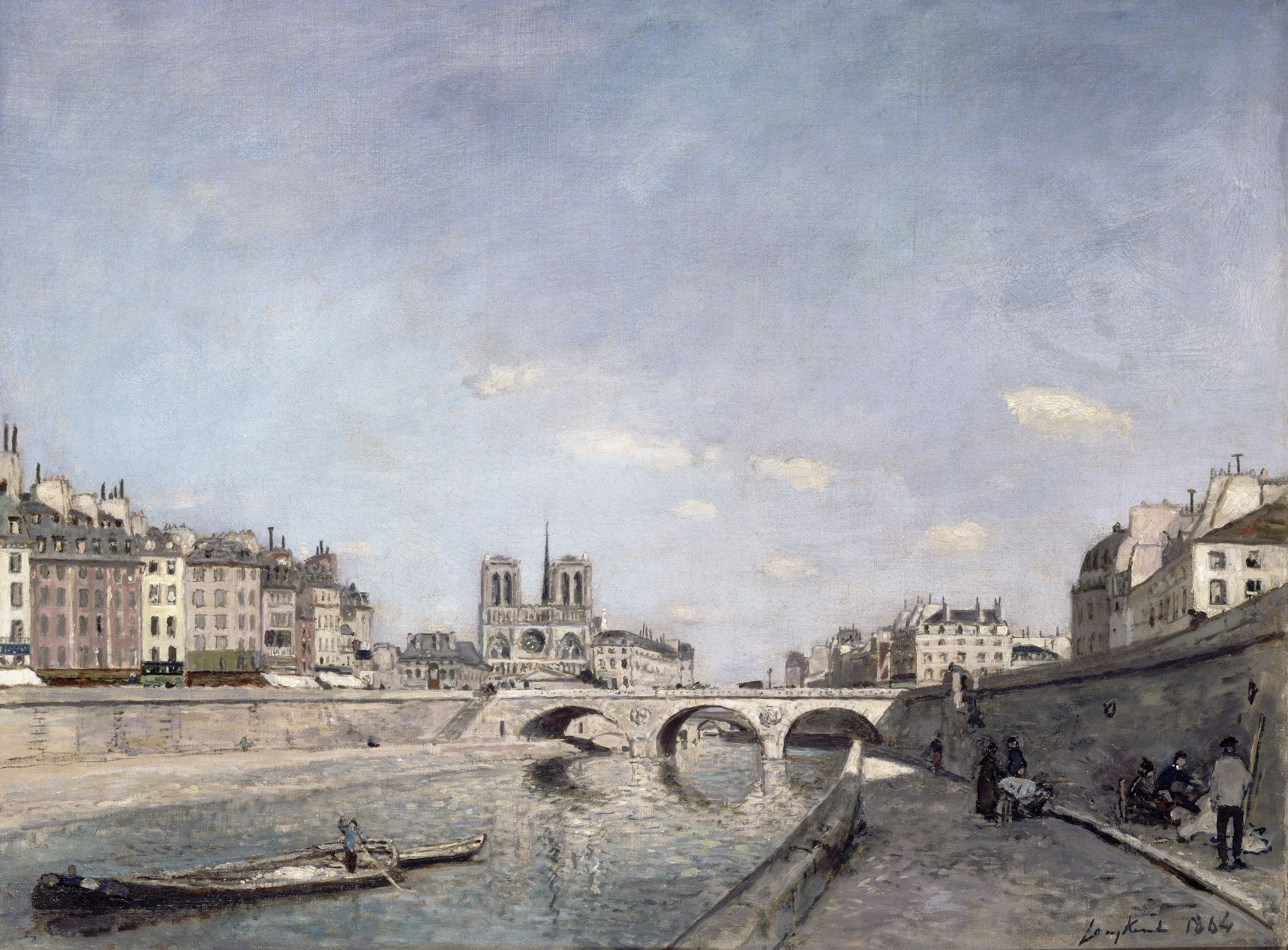
The Seine and Notre-Dame in Paris, 1864, Musée d'Orsay, Paris

Jongkind was born in the town of Lattrop in the Overijssel province of the Netherlands near the border with Germany. Trained at the art academy in The Hague under Andreas Schelfhout, in 1846 he moved to Montparnasse in Paris, France where he studied under Eugène Isabey and François-Édouard Picot. Two years later, the Paris Salon accepted his work for its exhibition, and he received acclaim from critic Charles Baudelaire and later on from Émile Zola. He was to experience little success, however, and he suffered bouts of depression complicated by alcoholism.

Jongkind returned to live in Rotterdam in 1855, and remained there until 1860. Back in Paris, in 1861 he rented a studio on the rue de Chevreuse in Montparnasse where some of his paintings began to show glimpses of the Impressionist style to come. From 1862 onwards, Jongkind travelled regularly to Normandy. In Normandy he established a friendship with the painter Eugène Boudin, becaming acquainted with Claude Monet and Frédéric Bazille. The Saint-Siméon farm in Honfleur was a meeting place for painters who had rank and name in France. Monet credited Jongkind for the "definitive education" of his own eye. In 1863 Jongkind exhibited at the first Salon des Refusés. He was invited to participate in the first exhibition of the Impressionist group in 1874, now known as the First Impressionist Exhibition, but he declined.

In 1878, Jongkind and his companion Joséphine Fesser moved to live in the small town of La Côte-Saint-André near Grenoble in the Isère département in the southeast of France. He died in 1891 in Saint-Égrève, in the same département. He is buried in the cemetery of La Côte-Saint-André. Streets are named after him in some Dutch town quarters dedicated to 19th- and 20th-century Dutch painters, for example Overtoomse Veld-Noord in Amsterdam and De Vijfhoek in Deventer, as well as in Grenoble in France.

== Commemoration ==
On 2 June 2019, a statue of Jongkind made by Dutch sculptor Rob Houdijk was unveiled in the Duifpolder between Maassluis and Vlaardingen alongside the Vlaardingertrekvaart canal, on the occasion of the 200th anniversary of his birth. At this spot, Jongkind must have made preparatory sketches of the Rechthuis van Zouteveen for his later etching "The two sailboats" from 1862.

== Subject and style ==
Jongkind's most frequent subject was the marine landscape, which he painted both in the Netherlands and in France. Many of his works depict the Seine, particularly the area near Notre-Dame de Paris cathedral. He painted watercolors out-of-doors, and used them as sketches for oil paintings made in his studio. His paintings are characterized by vigorous brushwork and strong contrasts. Like the 17th-century Dutch landscape painters of the Golden Age of Dutch painting, he typically composed his landscapes with a low horizon, allowing the sky to dominate.

== Selected paintings ==
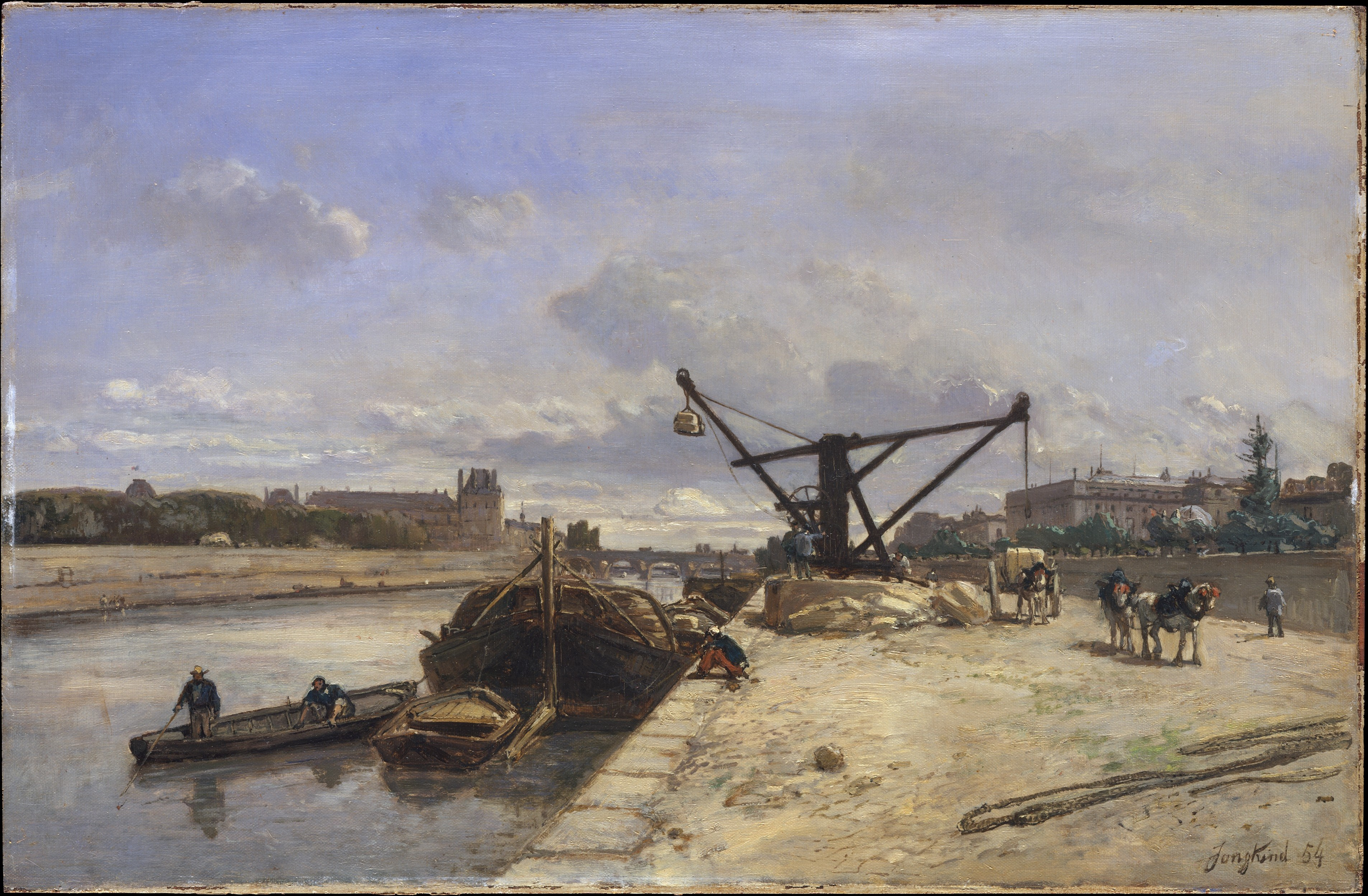
View from the Quai d'Orsay, 1854

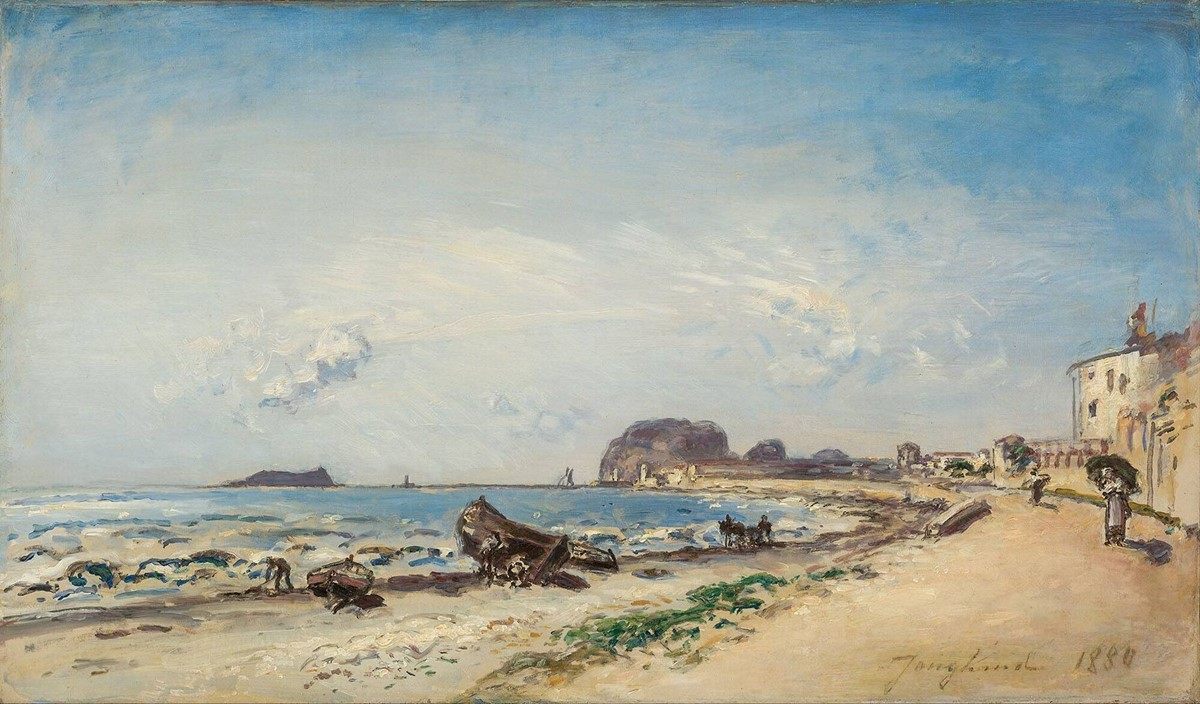
La Ciotat, 1880

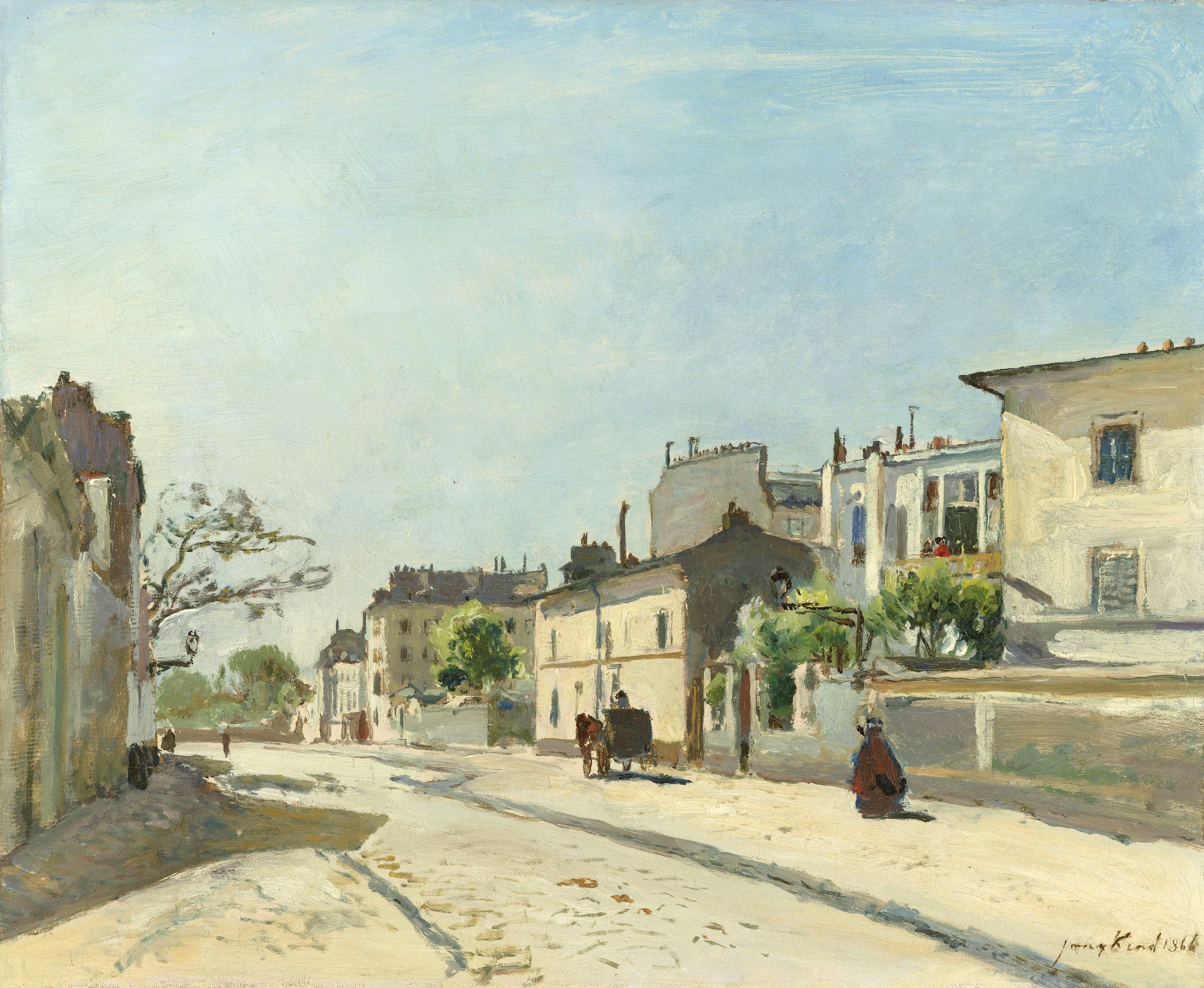
Rue Nôtre-Dame, Paris, 1866

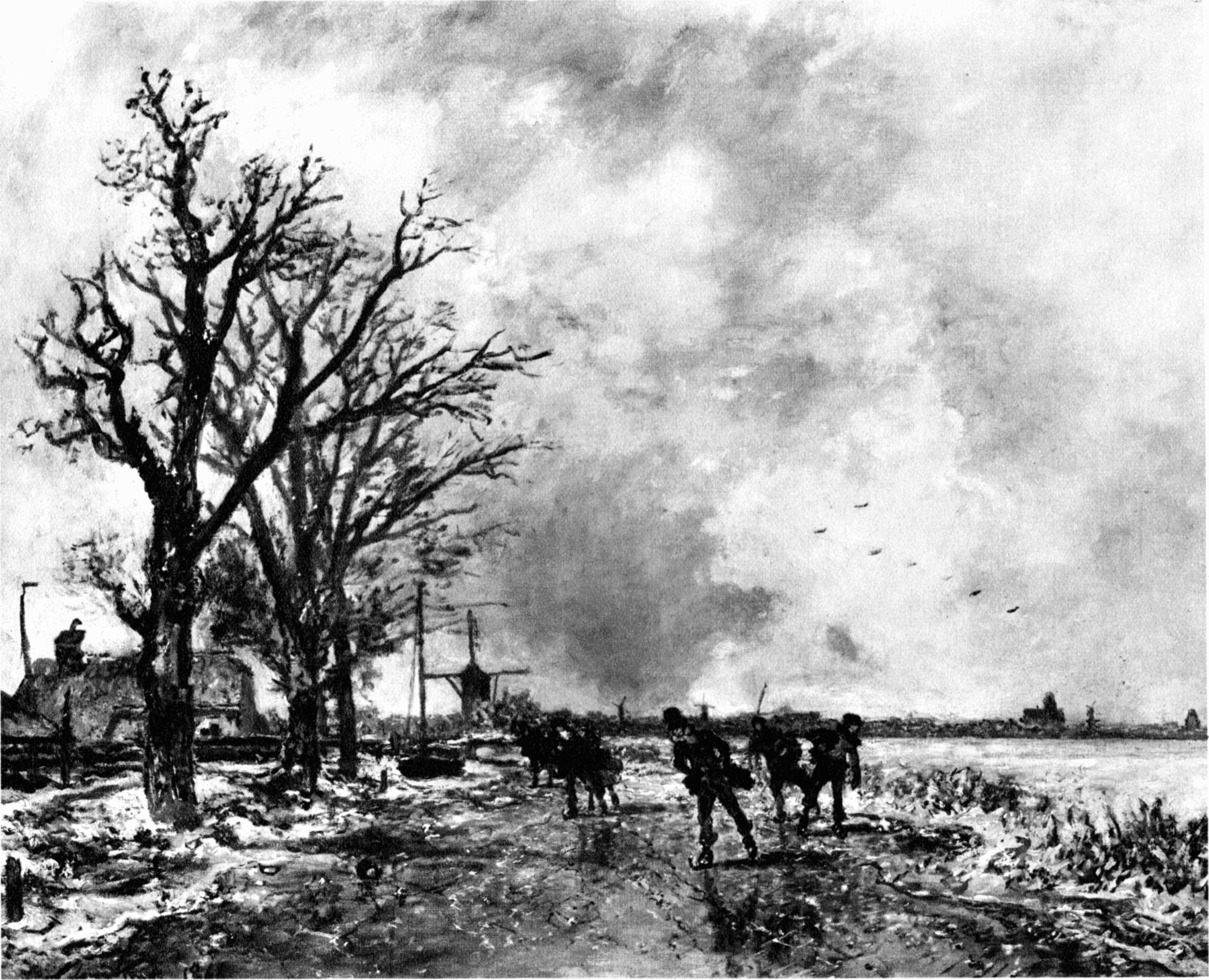
Ice Skaters, 1866

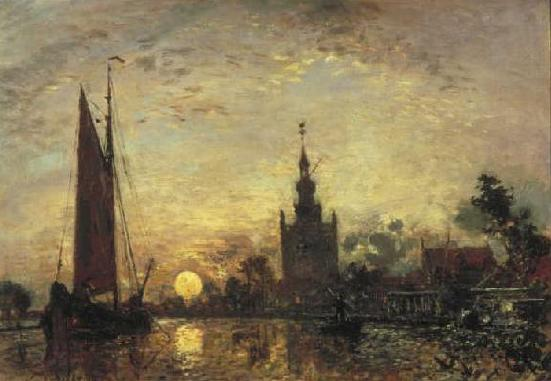
Sunset near Overschie, 1867

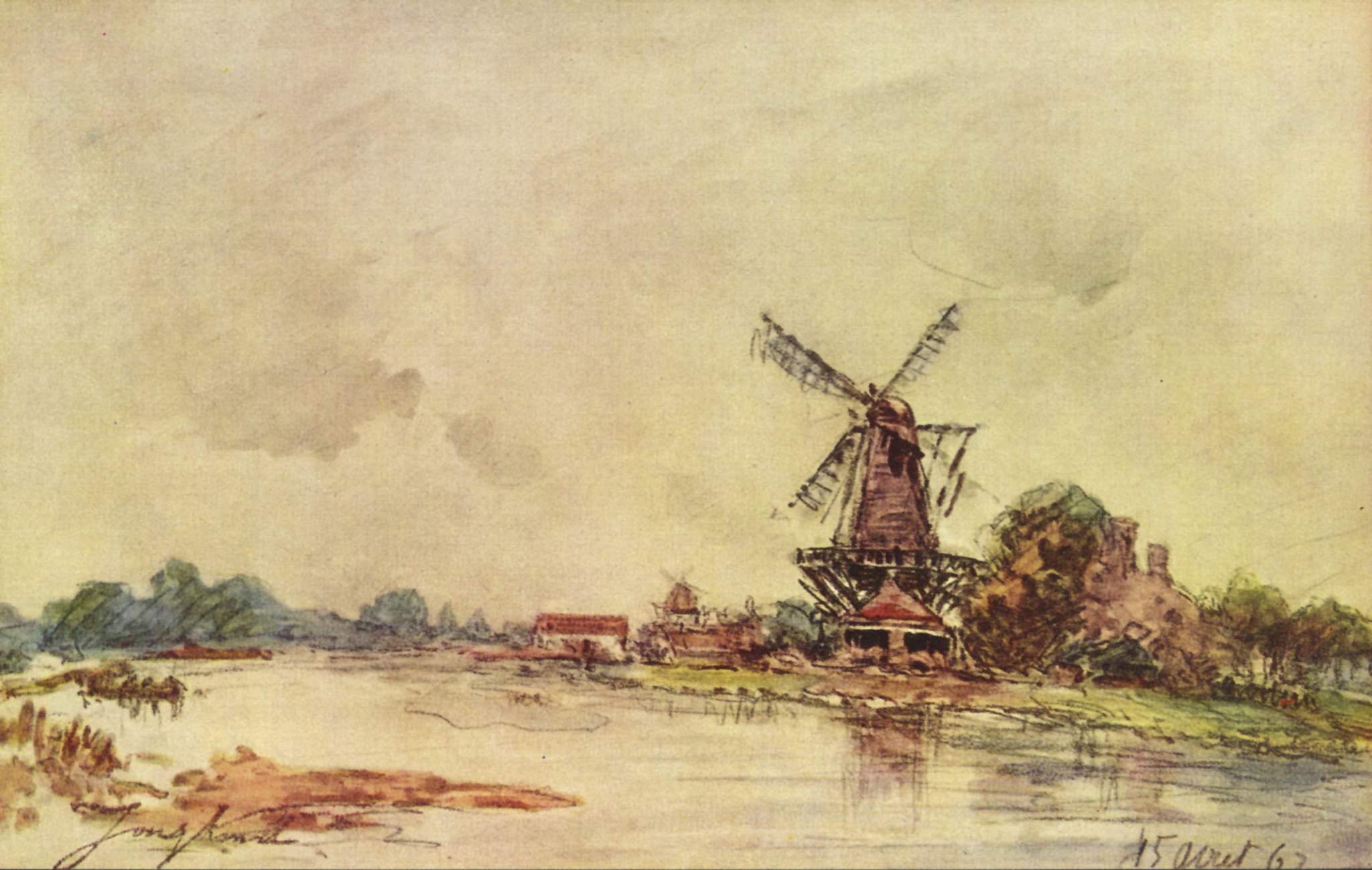
Landschaft, date unknown

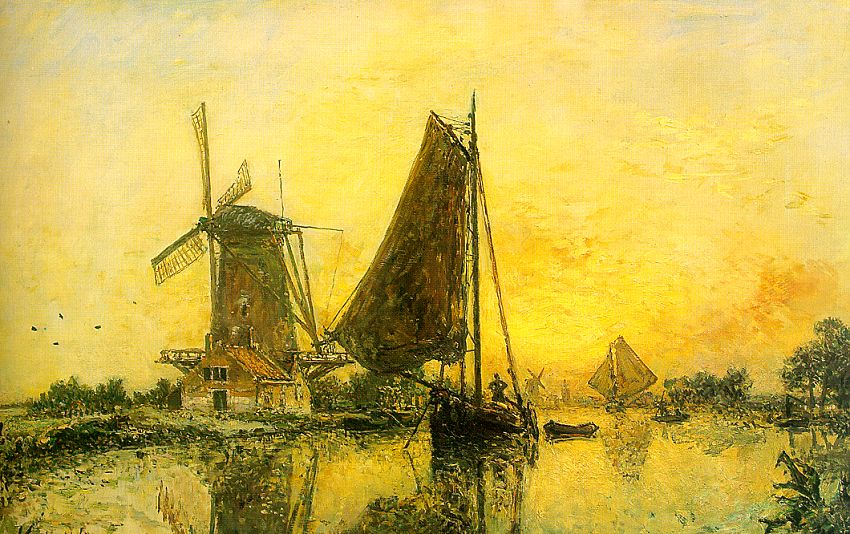
In Holland; Boats near the Mill, 1868

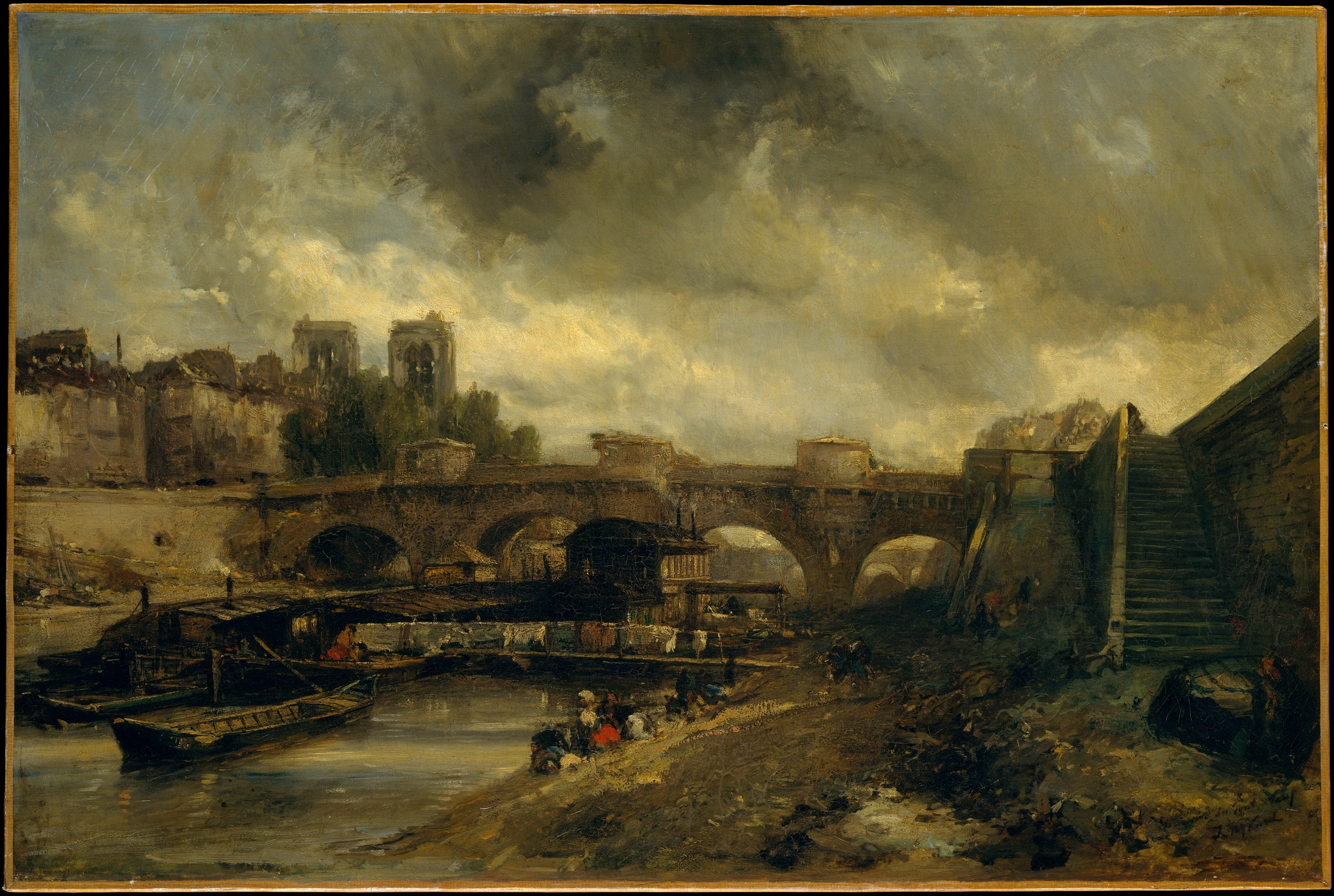
The Pont Neuf, 1849-1850

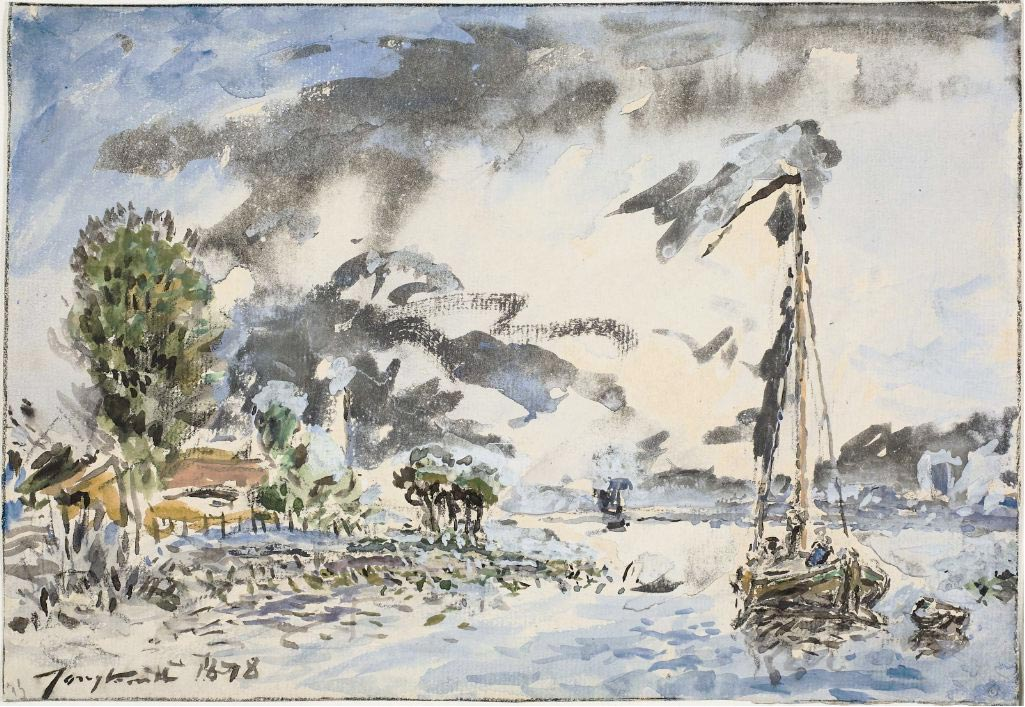
Fishing Boat, 1878

Jongkind's paintings, prints, and sketches are exhibited in museums worldwide including Museum Rotterdam, Rijksmuseum Twenthe, Petit Palais in Paris, the Metropolitan Museum of Art in New York City, the Museum of Fine Arts in Houston, the Art Institute of Chicago, the National Gallery in London, the National Museum in Kraków, and the Museo Municipal de Bellas Artes de Valparaíso.

== Bibliographies ==
- Ankelle, Daniel (2011): Johan Jonkind: 75 Impressionist Paintings - Impressionisme, Angelke Publishing LLC, ASIN: B005VU2H1Y.
- Auffret, François (2003): Jongkind 1819-1891 - Biographie Illustrée, Maisonneuve et Larose, Paris, ISBN 978-2-706-81766-3.
- Czymmek, Götz, Jaques Foucart John Sillevis u. a. (2004): Johan Barthold Jongkind: Ein Wegbereiter des Impressionismus, Ausstellungskatalog Richartz Wallraf Museum, Köln, ISBN 978-9-040-08924-4.
- Hefting, Victorine (1975). Jongkind—sa vie, son œuvre, son époque. Paris: Arts et métiers graphiques.
- Patin, Sylvie (2014): Jongkind - une Fascination pour La Lumière, Édition des Falaises, Rouen, ISBN 978-2-848-11229-9.
- Sillevis, John (2003): Jongkind Paintings, Bibliothèque De L'image, Paris, ISBN 978-2-914-66135-5.
- Stein, Adolphe. Jongkind—catalogue critique de l'oeuvre. (2003 volume 1) Paris: Brame & Lorenceau. ISBN 2951015666.
