= Lyodura =

Medical product now known as a transmitter of Creutzfeldt–Jakob disease

Lyodura was a medical product used in neurosurgery that has been shown to have a risk of transmitting Creutzfeldt–Jakob disease, a degenerative neurological disorder that is incurable, from affected donor cadavers to surgical recipients. Lyodura was introduced in 1969 as a product of B. Braun Melsungen AG, a leading hospital supply company based in Germany.

The product was used as a quick and effective patch material for surgery on the brain. It was a section of freeze-dried tissue which could be stored for extended periods on hospital shelves and could be made ready for use simply by soaking it in water for a few minutes. As suggested by the name, Lyodura consisted of lyophilized dura mater. Lyophilization is a technical term for freeze-drying.

Until 1987, Lyodura was manufacted by mixing together harvested tissue from different donors. The dura matter was then sterilized in batches using gamma radiation and freeze-drying. The manufacturer believed that its sterilization procedure was sufficiently powerful to render any diseases in the tissue harmless and was therefore unconcerned about cross-contamination from CJD-containing tissue to other tissue in the same sterilization vat. It is now believed that of the Lyodura product that was contaminated, almost all was tainted through this process. In 1987, after the first deaths linked to Lyodura, the manufacturer began processing tissue from each individual donor separately to prevent cross-contamination and rinsing it with sodium hydroxide, a proven means of deactivating prions, afterwards. That same year, the American Food and Drug Administration issued a safety alert advising medical professionals to dispose of all Lyodura that they could not confirm was from a different batch than the contaminated one, then an import alert stating that Lyodura was believed to carry Creutzfeldt–Jakob disease and shipments of it should be stopped by US customs agents as an "adulterated drug". The Australian Therapeutic Goods Administration also revoked its approval for use in 1987.

The manufacturer did not keep records that allowed contaminated product to be traced back to a specific donor. According to an article published in 1991, "unsubstantiated reports suggested that donor screening was not rigidly adhered to." The cost was around $300 Canadian Dollars for a piece the size of a postage stamp.

Lyodura was removed from sale in 1996. The World Health Organization recommended in 1997 that the medical field move away from cadaver-sourced dura mater grafts due to the risk of transmitting Creutzfeldt–Jakob disease highlighted by Lyodura-related cases. Dural grafts are now made from bovine tissue, various synthetic materials, or part of the patient's own body.

The product's largest consumer was Japan. By 2017, 154 patients in Japan had been diagnosed with Creutzfeldt–Jakob disease after receiving dural grafts. Every patient where the brand of graft could be identified from medical records had received a Lyodura graft. Patients continued to develop symptoms up to thirty years after their surgery. According to a study published in 2017, the odds of contracting CJD for patients in Japan who received a Lyodura graft was at least 1 in 877 (~0.1%). In 2004, five Australian patients had been diagnosed with Creutzfeldt–Jakob disease after receiving Lyodura grafts. Due to the long latent period of Creutzfeldt–Jakob disease, epidemiologists remain uncertain how many people will be affected by the disease. B.Braun Melsungen and several other entities agreed to compensate the families of Japanese CJD victims for more than $600,000 each.

An award-winning documentary was produced on the subject. The Canadian Broadcasting Corporation's The Fifth Estate segment, "Deadly Harvest", dealt with the product's history, sale in Canada, and health effects worldwide. The product has since been banned for use in Canada.
