= Arnold Grimme =

German botanist (1868–1959)

Arnold Grimme (28 November 1868, in Bückeburg – 1 November 1958, in Kassel) was a German veterinarian and naturalist, known for his botanical investigations of northern Hesse. The standard author abbreviation A.T.Grimme is used to indicate this person as the author when citing a botanical name.

He attended the veterinary school in Hanover, and later studied botany and zoology in Berlin. In 1902 he received his doctorate from the University of Marburg. During his career, he worked as a district veterinarian in Melsungen (1895–1910), Kiel (1910–1921) and Kassel (1921–1934). From 1932 to 1945 he was chairman of the Vereins für Naturkunde in Kassel. His herbarium is now located at the Naturkundemuseum Ottoneum in Kassel.

== Selected works ==
- Die Flora des Kreises Melsungen : ein Beitrag zur Kenntnis der Pflanzenvereine des niederhessischen Berglandes, 1909 – Flora of Kreis Melsungen.
- Die Torf- und Laubmoose des Hessischen Berglandes, 1936 – Peat and mosses of the Hessian mountains.
- Flora von Nordhessen, 1958 – Flora of North Hesse.
