= Melsungen =

- Town
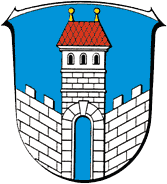
- Coat of arms

- Location of Melsungen within Schwalm-Eder-Kreis district
- Interactive map of Melsungen
- Location within Germany Location within Hesse
- Coordinates: 51°08′N 09°33′E
- Country: Germany
- State: Hesse
- Admin. region: Kassel
- District: Schwalm-Eder-Kreis
- Subdivisions: 7 Stadtteile

Government
  - Mayor (2018–24): Markus Boucsein (Ind.)

Area
  - Total: 63.09 km^{2} (24.36 sq mi)
- Elevation: 160–460 m (520–1,510 ft)

Population (2025-12-31)
  - Total: 13,992
  - Density: 221.8/km^{2} (574.4/sq mi)
- Time zone: UTC+01:00 (CET)
  - Summer (DST): UTC+02:00 (CEST)
- Postal codes: 34212
- Dialling codes: 05661
- Vehicle registration: HR
- Website: www.melsungen.de

Melsungen (German pronunciation: [ˈmɛlzʊŋən]) is a small climatic spa town in the Schwalm-Eder district in northern Hesse, Germany. In 1987, the town hosted the 27th Hessentag state festival.

== Geography ==
Melsungen lies on the river Fulda in the North Hesse Highlands. The streams Pfieffe and Kehrenbach, flow into the Fulda in the town. A few kilometres downstream, the river Eder flows into the Fulda.

=== Location ===
The nearest large towns are Kassel (downstream, about 22 km to the north) and Bad Hersfeld (upstream, about 32 km to the southeast).

=== Constituent communities ===
Melsungen consists of several smaller communities. Besides the main community, there are seven other communities: Adelshausen, Günsterode, Kehrenbach, Kirchhof, Obermelsungen, Röhrenfurth, and Schwarzenberg.

== History ==
Historical records of the town date from 802, but it was likely settled much earlier, during the Hallstatt period (9th to 4th Centuries BCE).

=== Middle Ages ===
Melsungen had developed into a small town (burgus) by 1189. The town's coat of arms also originated at this time.

In the course of its history, Melsungen often changed hands. The fiercest fighting over the town was between the Archbishops of Mainz and the Landgraves of Hesse and Thuringia.

Melsungen gained significance due to its location at the intersection of three medieval trade routes: the Sälzerweg, which runs east–west; the Nürnberger Straße, which runs north–south; and Durch die langen Hessen (roughly translated as "Through the Long Hessians").

=== Modern Age ===
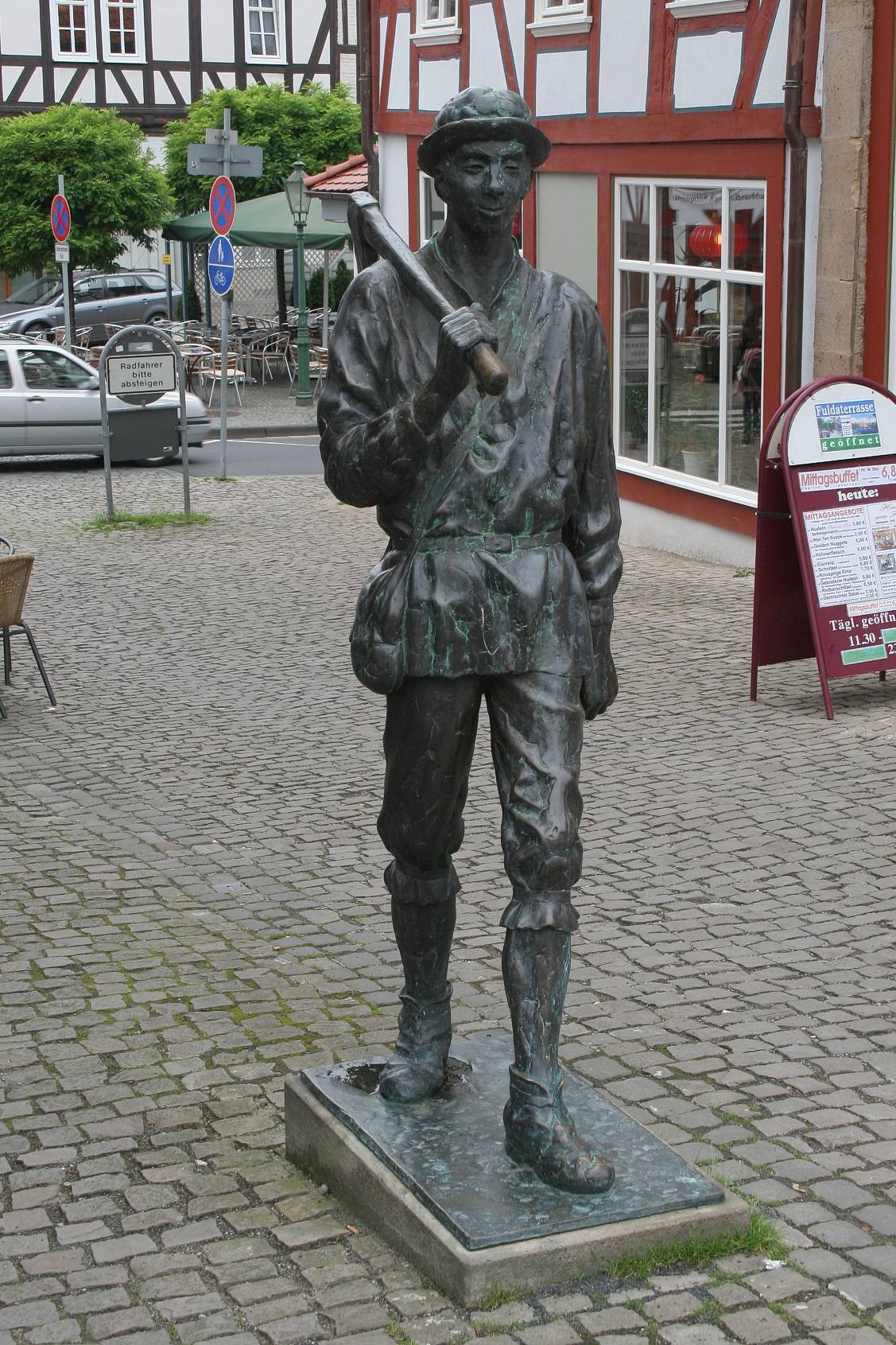
Sculpture Bartenwetzer

In 1554, a fire destroyed parts of the heart of town. In 1637, during the Thirty Years' War, the constituent community of Günsterode was laid waste.

From 1821 to 1974, Melsungen served as an administrative center and independent district seat, until the Melsungen district merged with the neighboring Fritzlar-Homberg and Ziegenhain districts.

The town's approximately 14,000 residents refer to themselves as Bartenwetzer ("Axe whetters").

=== Coat of arms ===
The origins of the old seal and the current civic coat of arms date back to the late 12th century. Heraldically, the arms can be described as follows: on a blue background, a town gate and tower in silver with a red roof topped by two gold finials, flanked by silver crenellated town walls.

The official description of the town's blazon specifies the roof as "tile-red" rather than "gules" (red). The arms have been in use since 1577.

== Politics ==
Town council consists of 37 members. Following the municipal elections held on 14 March 2021, the seats were apportioned thus:

Party	Votes	%	+/–	Seats	+/–
SPD	74,474	37.09	-6.3	14	-2
FDP	39,967	19.90	-3,3	7	+1
CDU	31,059	15.47	-1.0	6	+-0
GRÜNE	30,473	15.18	+6.1	6	+ 2
FWG	24,821	12.36	-2	4	-1
Total	200,794	100.00	–	37	–
Valid votes	200,794	99.89			
Invalid/blank votes	222	0.11			
Total votes	201,016	100.00			

The town executive consists of six councilors and the mayor. Three of these seats are held by the SPD, and one each by FDP, CDU, GRÜNE & FWG each.

List of elected mayors:

- 1998–2004: Karl-Heinz Dietzel (SPD)
- 2004–2013: Dieter Runzheimer (SPD)
- 2013–2025: Markus Boucsein
- 2025–incumbent: Timo Riedemann (SPD)

== Places of interest ==
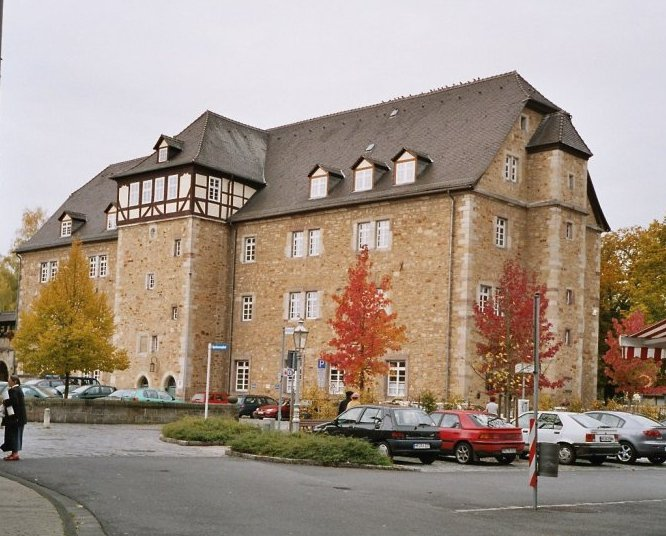
The Melsunger Schloss.

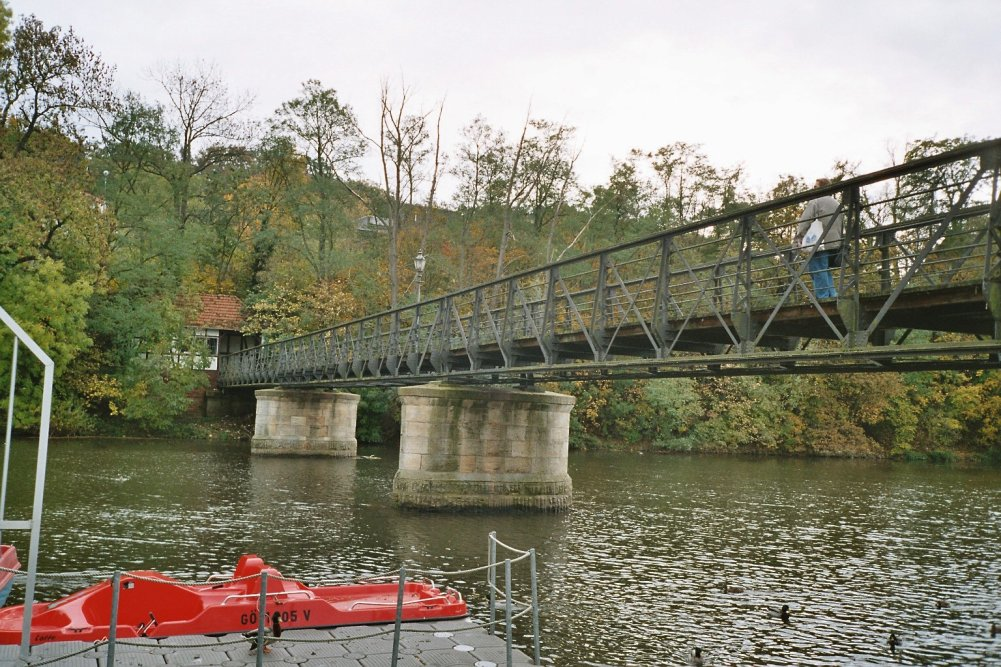
The "Zweipfennigbrücke" across the Fulda.

- Fachwerkstadt (compact area featuring half-timbered houses in the Old Town)
- Town Hall (from 1556), with Axe Whetter in the tower
- Schloss (stately home built between 1550 and 1557 by Landgrave Philip) with garden
- Marketplace
- Bartenwetzerbrücke ("Axe Whetters' Bridge" built between 1595 and 1596)
- Gothic town church (built between 1415 and 1425)
- Hospitalskapelle St. Georg ("St George's Hospital Chapel")
- Eulenturm ("Owl Tower"; a preserved tower from the old town wall)
- Zweipfenningsbrücke ("Twopenny Bridge" from 1890)
- Stirling-Bau (B. Braun Melsungen AG's Pfieffewiesen Works)

== Sport ==
- MT Melsungen (handball)
- Melsunger Fußballverein 08 (football)

== Culture ==
=== Regular events ===
- Melsunger Weinfest (wine festival)
- Melsunger Kabarett-Wettbewerb (cabaret contest)
- Bad Liebenstein-Stafette (yearly relay)

=== Culinary specialities ===
- Ahle Wurst (or Aahle Worscht), a kind of Hessian hard pork sausage. Its name is a dialectal form of alte Wurst – "old sausage".

== Transportation ==
The town lies on Autobahn A 7. Federal Highway (Bundesstraße) B 83 runs through Melsungen and Bundesstraßen B 253 and B 487 both begin (or end) here.

Melsungen lies on the Kassel—Bebra—Fulda railway line and belongs to the North Hesse Transport Network. In May 2006 the RegioTram line RT5 (Kassel-Melsungen) began. It directly connects Melsungen with downtown Kassel. The line ends at present where the Melsungen-Süd return loop is still not finished. Further stations are being built at Melsungen-Schwarzenberg und Melsungen-Bartenwetzerbrücke.

== Economy ==
Melsungen is home to the firm of B. Braun Melsungen, which has a €9,100,000,000 yearly turnover, and about 64,000 employees worldwide (as of 2024).

== Notable people ==
- Johannes Rhenanus (c.1528 in Melsungen–1589) salinist, theologian, alchemist, printer and author.
- Arnold Grimme (1868–1958) veterinarian and naturalist, district veterinarian in Melsungen (1895–1910)
- Reinhard Selten (1930–2016) Nobel Prize winner in Economics for his contribution to game theory
- Alwin Wagner (born 1950 in Melsungen) discus thrower and weight lifter, competed in 1984 Summer Olympics
- Christof Lauer (born 1953 in Melsungen) jazz tenor and soprano saxophonist
- Anna Maria Braun (born 1979) CEO of the billion-dollar company B. Braun

== Twin towns ==
Melsungen has partnerships with the following towns:

- Dreux, France, since 1966
- Evesham, United Kingdom, since 1982
- Todi, Italy, since 1985–86
- Koudougou, Burkina Faso, since 1990
- (Germany) Bad Liebenstein, Thuringia, since 1990

There is also a "friendship" with the Berlin community of Spandau.
