= 2026 FIM Long Track World Championship =

World motorcycle racing competition

2026 Individual Long Track World Championship
- Start date: 23 August
- End date: 26 September

The 2026 FIM Long Track World Championship was the 56th edition of the FIM Individual Long Track World Championship.

Zach Wajtknecht was the defending champion having won the title for the first time in 2025.

The first round in Marmande was originally supposed to take place on 13 July, but was cancelled due to the severe heat alert issues in France. It was rescheduled as the final round on 26 September.

Former two-time champion Erik Riss returned to the competition and claimed his third world title, winning the opening two rounds. Dave Meijerink finishing second, with Chris Harris completing the podium.

== Venues ==
Final	Date	Venue	Winner	Ref
1	23 August	(Germany) Eichenring Scheeßel	(Germany) Erik Riss	
2	5 September	(France) Morizès	(Germany) Erik Riss	
3	26 September	(France) Marmande Speedway	(England) Chris Harris	

== Final Classification ==
Pos	Rider	Final 1	Final 2	Final 3	Total
1	(Germany) Erik Riss	26	26	22	74
2	(Netherlands) Dave Meijerink	24	18	24	66
3	(England) Chris Harris	22	11	26	59
4	(Germany) Lukas Fienhage	15	24	20	59
5	(England) Zach Wajtknecht	20	22	16	58
6	(Finland) Jesse Mustonen	16	16	18	50
7	(Netherlands) Mika Meijer	11	14	15	40
8	(Finland) Tero Aarnio	10	15	13	38
9	(Netherlands) William Kruit	13	13	11	37
10	(Denmark) Patrick Kruse	14	12	9	35
11	(Denmark) Kenneth Kruse Hansen	18	x	14	32
12	(Norway) Glenn Moi	12	10	6	28
13	(France) Mathias Trésarrieu	x	20	x	20
14	(England) Jake Mulford	9	4	12	25
15	(France) Tino Bouin	7	0	10	17
16	(France) Anthony Chauffour	5	2	7	14
17	(Netherlands) Romano Hummel	x	9	x	9
18	(England) Darryl Ritchings	x	5	4	9
19	(France) Theo Ugoni	x	7	1	8
20	(France) Noah Urda	x	6	x	6
21	(England) Andrew Appleton	6	x	x	6
22	(Netherlands) Niek Meijerink	x	x	5	5
23	(France) Jordan Dubernard	2	3	x	5
24	(Germany) Timo Wachs	4	x	x	4
25	(Germany) Keijo Busch	3	x	x	3
26	(England) Ashton Vale	x	x	3	3
27	(Czech Republic) Jan Hlačina	x	1	2	3
28	(Germany) Daniel Spiller	1	x	x	1
29	(Germany) Fabian Wachs	0	x	x	1

== See also ==
- 2026 FIM Long Track of Nations
