= FIM Long Track Youth World Cup =

The FIM Long Track Youth World Cup, formerly known as the FIM Long Track Youth World Cup 250cc and the FIM Long Track Youth Gold Trophy, was an international Long Track event held from 2010 to 2018 for 250cc machinery. The final edition was staged at Wittstock in Germany in 2018.

== Medalists ==
Year	Venue	Champion	Runner-up	3rd place
2010	(United Kingdom) Tallington	(France) Richard De Biasi	(United Kingdom) Oliver Greenwood	(France) Xavier Muratet
2011	(France) Tayac	(France) Richard De Biasi	(France) Anthony Caldo	(Germany) Andre Majewsky
2012	(Germany) Vechta	(France) Dimitri Bergé	(Germany) Michael Härtel	(Germany) Daniel Spiller
2013	(Germany) Vechta	(Netherlands) Romano Hummel	(France) Jordan Dubernard	(France) Maeron Hermes
2014	(France) Morizès	(United Kingdom) Zach Wajtknecht	(Germany) Lukas Fienhage	(France) Gaétan Stella
2015	(Germany) Vechta	(Denmark) Mads Hansen	(France) Gaétan Stella	(Germany) Niels Oliver Wessel
2016	(Poland) Toruń	(France) Gaétan Stella	(Netherlands) Dave Meijerink	(Netherlands) Mika Meijer
2017	(Czech Republic) Pardubice	(Denmark) Mads Hansen	(Germany) Celina Liebmann	(United Kingdom) Charlie Brooks
2018	(Germany) Wittstock	(France) Steven Labouyrie	(Germany) Ben Ernst	(Australia) Keynan Rew
