= 2026 FIM Long Track of Nations =

2026 Speedway event

- Venue: Speed Centre Roden
- Location: Roden, Netherlands

The 2026 FIM Long Track of Nations was the 18th annual FIM Team Long Track World Championship. The final took place on 20 September 2025 at the Speed Centre in Roden, Netherlands.

The Netherlands won the event for the first time since 2023, defeating defending champions Great Britain in the final. Great Britain had initially top scored during the qualifying rounds. France completed the podium.

== Results ==
- (Netherlands) Speed Centre, Roden
- 20 September 2026

Pos.	Team	Pts	riders
1	Great Britain	65	Zach Wajtknecht 27, Chris Harris 21, Jake Mulford 9, James Shanes 8
2	Netherlands	59	Dave Meijerink 28, Romano Hummel 13, William Kruit 10, Mika Meijer 8
3	France	45	Tino Bouin 18, Anthony Chauffour 17, Noah Urda 10
4	Denmark	43	Patrick Kruse 18, Kenneth Hansen 14, Jacob Bukhave 11
5	Germany	40	Lukas Fienhage 29, Timo Wachs 9, Dominik Werkstetter 1, Fabian Wachs 1
6	Finland	37	Jesse Mustonen 20, Ossi Rantala 11, Tero Aarnio 6
7	Norway	25	Glenn Moi 16, Truls Kamhaug 5, Robert Langeland 2, Magnus Klipper 2

=== Grand Final ===
1st	2nd
Netherlands - 8 Dave Meijerink - 5 Romano Hummel - 2 Mika Meijer - 1	Great Britain - 7 Zach Wajtknecht - 4 James Shanes - 3 Chris Harris - 0

== See also ==
- 2026 FIM Long Track World Championship
