= 2016 Premier League speedway season =

British motorcycle speedway season

- Champions: Somerset Rebels
- Knockout Cup: Glasgow Tigers
- Individual: Simon Stead
- Pairs: Somerset Rebels
- Fours: Plymouth Devils
- Highest average: Craig Cook
- Division/s above: 2016 Elite League
- Division/s below: 2016 National League

The 2016 Premier League season was the second division of British speedway. The title was won by Somerset Rebels who defeated Sheffield Tigers in the Grand Final.

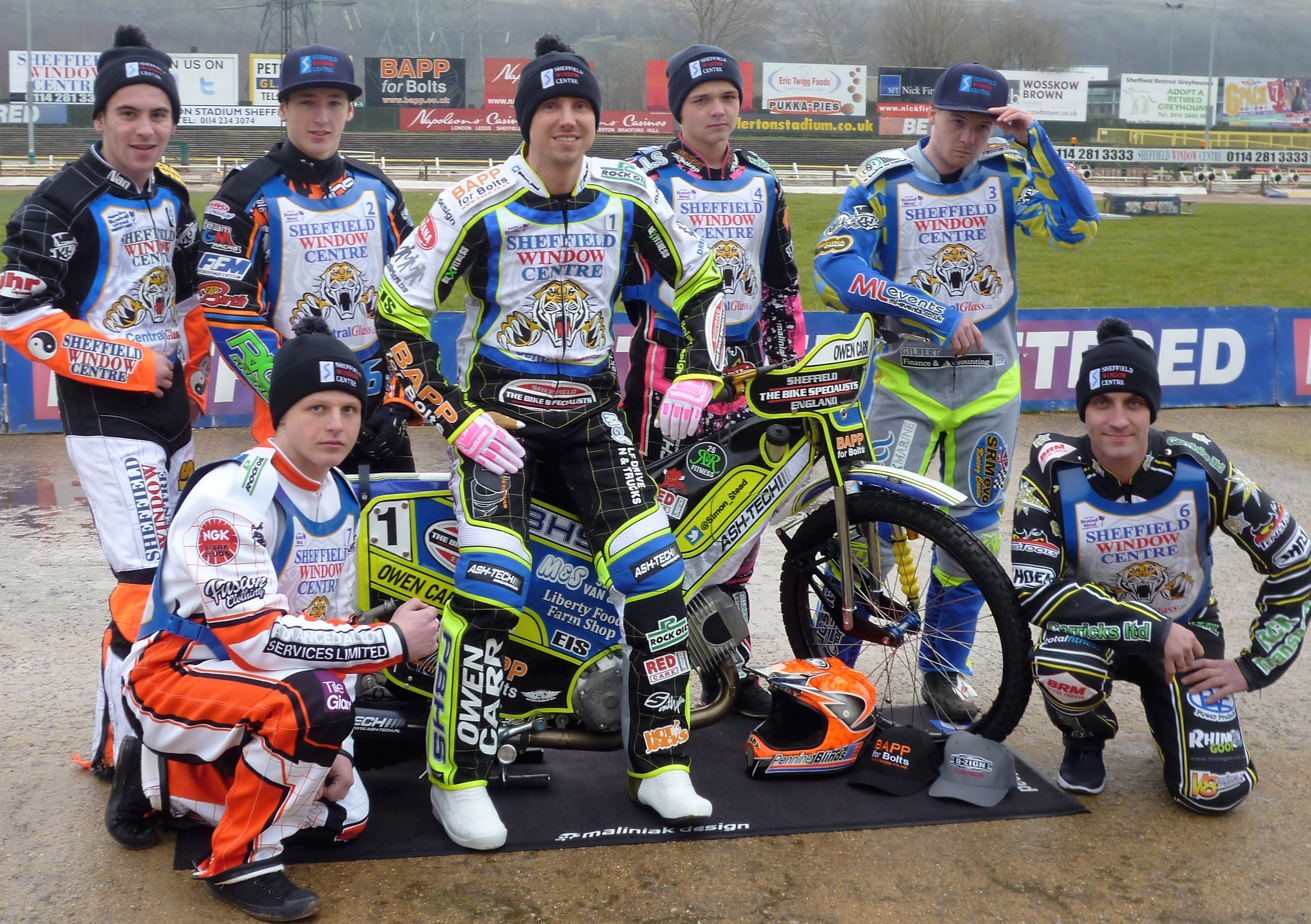
Sheffield Tigers were defeated by Somerset in the play off final

== Final league table ==
Pos	Team	Played	Won	Drawn	Lost	4w	3w	D	1L	L	For	Against	Points
1	Somerset Rebels	24	12	0	0	1	6	1	0	4	1192	998	60
2	Glasgow Tigers	24	11	0	1	4	2	0	2	4	1212	962	57
3	Newcastle Diamonds	24	12	0	0	2	2	0	3	5	1171	989	53
4	Edinburgh Monarchs	24	11	0	1	1	2	0	4	5	1088	1043	47
5	Ipswich Witches	24	10	0	2	1	1	1	1	8	1136	1057	40
6	Sheffield Tigers	24	10	1	1	1	1	1	0	9	1080	1104	40
7	Workington Comets	24	11	0	1	0	1	1	0	10	1058	1126	38
8	Peterborough Panthers	24	6	1	5	3	2	0	1	6	1056	1131	38
9	Rye House Rockets	24	7	2	3	1	0	0	4	7	1042	1114	31
10	Berwick Bandits	24	7	1	4	1	0	1	1	9	1042	1097	29
11	Scunthorpe Scorpions	24	7	0	5	0	1	0	2	9	1017	1160	26
12	Plymouth Devils	24	8	0	4	0	0	0	1	11	992	1126	25
13	Redcar Bears	24	5	1	6	0	0	1	3	8	997	1176	21

Scoring

- Home draw = 1 point
- Home win by any number of points = 3
- Away loss by 6 points or less = 1
- Away draw = 2
- Away win by between 1 and 6 points = 3
- Away win by 7 points or more = 4

== Fixtures & results ==
Home \ Away	BER	ED	GLA	IPS	NEW	PET	PLY	RED	RYE	SCU	SHE	SOM	WOR
Berwick Bandits		50–40	31–58	60–33	42–50	40–50	40–32	46–44	56–37	60–33	41–49	45–45	59–31
Edinburgh Monarchs	50–44		38–55	52–39	46–44	59–33	39–30	62–28	45–44	49–40	56–36	50–43	49–41
Glasgow Tigers	53–38	51–39		50–39	49–40	62–30	57–35	51–39	54–36	71–19	62–30	44–46	59–31
Ipswich Witches	58–34	48–45	44–46		52–41	57–36	61–29	61–32	48–45	56–34	59–34	42–48	69–23
Newcastle Diamonds	51–39	33–27	49–44	55–37		59–34	55–37	58–35	57–36	61–31	54–36	57–36	57–33
Peterborough Panthers	50–40	39–52	50–40	56–36	38–54		55–34	45–45	46–43	44–46	50–40	37–53	45–48
Plymouth Devils	47–43	52–41	39–51	42–48	43–47	52–40		48–42	48–45	48–42	52–41	43–47	56–37
Redcar Bears	47–31	45–48	48–44	37–53	44–45	40–53	47–43		41–49	48–41	45–45	46–47	50–43
Rye House Rockets	45–45	47–42	44–46	53–39	48–42	42–48	35–25	55–37		48–45	51–41	45–47	45–45
Scunthorpe Scorpions	39–52	44–45	51–39	53–37	54–38	40–53	50–43	54–39	51–39		43–49	43–47	54–30
Sheffield Tigers	49–36	47–43	54–38	45–45	49–40	45–48	51–42	51–41	56–37	54–35		50–40	53–38
Somerset Rebels	56–34	57–35	53–37	61–31	47–43	57–33	57–35	47–43	55–38	52–41	53–38		55–38
Workington Comets	50–40	57–36	39–51	46–44	52–41	47–43	55–37	56–34	55–35	58–34	55–37	50–43	

Legend: Blue = home team win; Yellow = draw; Red = away team win.

== Play-offs ==
Quarter-finals

Team one	Team two	First Leg	Second Leg	Aggregate
Ipswich	Edinburgh	58-32	37-53	95–85
Sheffield	Newcastle	48-42	44-46	92–88

Semi-finals

Team one	Team two	First Leg	Second Leg	Aggregate
Somerset	Ipswich	53-37	49-41	102–78
Sheffield	Glasgow	49-41	42-48	91–87

== Play Off final ==
First leg

24 October 2014

Sheffield Tigers Kyle Howarth 13 Stuart Robson 12 Arthur Sissis 6 Josh Bates 6 Ricky Wells 4 Nathan Greaves 3 Simon Stead R/R	44 – 46	Somerset Rebels Josh Grajczonek 12 Rohan Tungate 12 Paul Starke 7 Charles Wright 6 Robert Branford 4 James Shanes 3 Jake Allen 3

Owlerton Stadium

Second leg

25 October 2014

Somerset Rebels Rohan Tungate 12 Josh Grajczonek 11 Paul Starke 11 Charles Wright 8 Robert Branford 6 Jake Allen 5 James Shanes 2	54 – 36	Sheffield Tigers Ricky Wells 11 Kyle Howarth 9 Stuart Robson 8 Arthur Sissis 5 Josh Bates 3 Nathan Greaves 0 Dimitri Bergé R/R

Oaktree Arena

Somerset were declared League Champions, winning on aggregate 100–80.

== Knockout Cup ==
The 2016 Premier League Knockout Cup was the 49th edition of the Knockout Cup for tier two teams. It was the last time it would be known as the Premier League Knockout Cup because the following season it would be the SGB Championship Knockout Cup.

Glasgow Tigers were the winners of the competition.

First round

Date	Team one	Score	Team two
02/05	Scunthorpe	50-40	Newcastle
06/05	Somerset	52-38	Workington
12/05	Ipswich	46-44	Rye House
13/05	Edinburgh	54-36	Plymouth
14/05	Plymouth	47-42	Edinburgh
14/05	Rye House	53-37	Ipswich
14/05	Workington	44-46	Somerset
22/05	Glasgow	60-29	Redcar
26/05	Redcar	40-50	Glasgow
11/07	Newcastle	57-32	Scunthorpe

Quarter-finals

Date	Team one	Score	Team two
03/07	Peterborough	38-52	Somerset
28/06	Somerset	62-28	Peterborough
17/07	Newcastle	62-28	Sheffield
21/07	Sheffield	45-45	Newcastle
31/07	Glasgow	54-30	Edinburgh
06/08	Berwick	53-37	Rye House
29/08	Rye House	54-36	Berwick
26/08	Edinburgh	48-41	Glasgow

Semi-finals

Date	Team one	Score	Team two
09/10	Newcastle	47-43	Rye House
07/10	Rye House	47-43	Newcastle
08/10	Glasgow	50-39	Somerset
23/09	Somerset	34-38	Glasgow

=== Final ===
First leg

23 October 2016

Newcastle Diamonds Robert Lambert 14 Steve Worrall 10 Ashley Morris 10 Ludvig Lindgren 9 Victor Palovaara 2 Danny Phillips 0 Matej Kus 0	45 – 45	Glasgow Tigers Richie Worrall 9 Rene Bach 8 Aaron Summers 7 Richard Lawson 7 Danny Ayres 6 Nike Lunna 5 Mitchell Davey 3

Newcastle Stadium

Second leg

24 October 2016

Glasgow Tigers Richard Lawson 12 Richie Worrall 11 Aaron Summers 11 Arthur Sissis 10 Rene Bach 8 Nike Lunna 7 Danny Ayres 0	59 – 31	Newcastle Diamonds Robert Lambert 10 Steve Worrall 7 Ludvig Lindgren 5 Ashley Morris 4 Danny Phillips 3 Victor Palovaara 2 Matej Kus R/R

Ashfield Stadium

Glasgow were declared Knockout Cup Champions, winning on aggregate 104–76.

== Riders' Championship ==
Simon Stead won the Riders' Championship for the second time. The final was held on 11 September at Owlerton Stadium.

Pos.	Rider	Pts	Total	SF	Final
1	(England) Simon Stead	3 3 2 3 2	13	-	3
2	(Australia) Sam Masters	3 2 3 0 3	11	2	2
3	(France) David Bellego	2 3 1 3 3	12	3	1
4	(England) Richard Lawson	3 2 3 3 2	13	-	0
5	(England) Danny King	2 3 2 2 2	11	1	
6	(Australia) Jack Holder	3 F 3 2 2	10	0	
7	(England) Kyle Howarth	1 3 1 2 1	8		
8	(Australia) Josh Grajczonek	2 1 1 1 3	8		
9	(Australia) Kevin Doolan	0 1 0 2 3	6		
10	(England) Steve Worrall	2 0 2 0 1	5		
11	(England) Craig Cook	0 1 2 1 1	5		
12	(England) Josh Auty	1 2 0 1 1	5		
13	(United States) Ricky Wells	1 0 3 1 0	5		
14	(Australia) Aaron Summers	0 1 0 3 0	4		
15	(Denmark) Ulrich Østergaard	0 2 1 0 0	3		
16	(Denmark) Claus Vissing	1 0 0 0 R	1		

- f=fell, r-retired, ex=excluded, ef=engine failure t=touched tapes

== Pairs ==
The Premier League Pairs Championship was held at Oaktree Arena on 8 July. The event was won by Somerset Rebels.

Group A
Pos	Team	Pts	Riders
1	Somerset	26	Grajczonek 14, Tungate 12
2	Glasgow	18	Lawson 9, Summers 9
3	Workington	17	Vissing 9, Wells 8
4	Peterborough	15	Ostergaard 10, Jakobsen 5
5	Newcastle	14	Kus 10, Rose 4

Group B
Pos	Team	Pts	Riders
1	Edinburgh	23	Fisher 14, Masters 9
2	Sheffield	21	Stead 11, Howarth 10
3	Plymouth	20	Kurtz 12, Holder 8
4	Ipswich	15	Covatti 13, Risager 2
5	Rye House	11	Robson 11, Heeps 0

Semi finals

- Edinburgh bt Glasgow 5–4
- Somerset bt Sheffield 7–2

Final

- Somerset bt Edinburgh 7–2

== Fours ==
Plymouth Devils won the Premier League Four-Team Championship, held on 23 and 24 July 2016, at the East of England Arena.

Group A
Pos	Team	Pts	Riders
1	Workington	23	Hansen 8, Wells 6, Jensen 5, Vissing 4
2	Glasgow	23	Worrall 7, Bach 6, Lawson 5, Summers 5
3	Somerset	12	Grajczonek 6, Allen 4, Tungate 3, Starke 1, Wilson-Dean 0
4	Scunthorpe	12	Palm Toft 6, Douglas 4, Wilkinson 1, Auty 1

Group B
Pos	Team	Pts	Riders
1	Plymouth	23	Holder 8, Kurtz B 8, Newman 6, Kurtz T 1
2	Sheffield	18	Howarth 8, Berge 4, Stead 3, Bates 3
3	Newcastle	17	Worrall 7, Lambert 5, Rose 3, Phillips 2
4	Redcar	14	Bjerre 9, Andersen 3, Bellego 2, Skidmore 0

Group C
Pos	Team	Pts	Riders
1	Berwick	21	Jorgensen 8, Doolan 5, Pjiper 5, Wethers 3
2	Edinburgh	20	Masters 9, Fisher 5, Riss 3, Wolbert 3
3	Rye House	17	Robson 8, Lanham 5, Heeps 3, Kennett 1
4	Ipswich	14	King 5, Covatti 5, Barker 2, Risager 2

Final
Pos	Team	Pts	Riders
1	Plymouth	30	Holder 11, Kurtz B 7, Kurtz T 7, Newman 5
2	Workington	29	Hansen 10, Wells 7, Vissing 7, Jensen 5
3	Peterborough	25	Cook 11, Jakobsen 7, Ostergaard 4, Perry 2, Grondal 1
4	Berwick	12	Doolan 4, Wethers 4, Jorgensen 3, Pjiper 1

== Final Leading averages ==
Rider	Team	Average
(England) Craig Cook	Peterborough	9.83
(England) Danny King	Ipswich	9.57
(England) Edward Kennett	Rye House	9.27
(Australia) Rohan Tungate	Somerset	9.03
(Australia) Sam Masters	Edinburgh	8.97
(England) Robert Lambert	Newcastle	8.92
(Australia) Josh Grajczonek	Somerset	8.90
(Australia) Aaron Summers	Glasgow	8.57
(England) Jason Garrity	Sheffield	8.55
(England) Richie Worrall	Glasgow	8.49

== Teams ==
Berwick Bandits

- (Denmark) Thomas Jørgensen 7.45
- (Sweden) Sebastian Aldén 7.18
- (Australia) Kevin Doolan 6.99
- (Netherlands) Theo Pijper 6.16
- (Australia) Matthew Wethers 5.65
- (Sweden) Anders Mellgren 5.09
- (England) Liam Carr 4.81
- (England) Tom Perry 3.76
- (Austria) Dany Gappmaier 3.75
- (Netherlands) Romano Hummel 2.86
- (Denmark) Henning Bager 2.67
- (Poland) Dawid Stachyra 1.74

Edinburgh Monarchs

- (Australia) Sam Masters 8.97
- (Germany) Kevin Wölbert 8.00
- (United States) Ryan Fisher 7.49
- (Germany) Erik Riss 6.85
- (England) Max Clegg 4.34
- (England) Dan Bewley 4.00
- (Germany) Mark Riss 3.27
- (Australia) Jye Etheridge 1.00

Glasgow Tigers

- (Australia) Aaron Summers 8.57
- (England) Richie Worrall 8.49
- (England) Richard Lawson 8.22
- (Denmark) René Bach 7.53
- (England) Ben Barker 7.48
- (Finland) Nike Lunna 4.90
- (Argentina) Coty Garcia 4.23
- (England) Danny Ayres 3.70

Ipswich Witches

- (England) Danny King 9.57
- (England) Ben Barker 7.91
- (Argentina) Nico Covatti 7.49
- (Denmark) Morten Risager 7.13
- (England) Lewis Kerr 6.48
- (England) James Sarjeant 5.80
- (England) Joe Jacobs 5.36
- (England) Danyon Hume 3.48
- (Italy) Michele Paco Castagna 2.78
- (England) Oliver Greenwood 2.12
- (England) Darryl Ritchings 1.88

Newcastle Diamonds

- (England) Robert Lambert 8.92
- (England) Steve Worrall 8.47
- (Czech Republic) Matěj Kůs 7.74
- (Sweden) Ludvig Lindgren 7.69
- (England) Lewis Rose 6.12
- (Finland) Tero Aarnio 6.24
- (Sweden) Victor Palovaara 5.80
- (England) Ashley Morris 4.98
- (England) Danny Phillips 1.73

Peterborough Panthers

- (Denmark) Lasse Bjerre 10.40 (2 matches only)
- (England) Craig Cook 9.83
- (Denmark) Anders Thomsen 8.29
- (Denmark) Ulrich Østergaard 7.14
- (Denmark) Nicklas Porsing 6.58
- (Denmark) Nikolaj Busk Jakobsen 6.50
- (England) Simon Lambert 5.25
- (Denmark) Michael Palm Toft 5.18
- (England) Ashley Morris 4.67
- (Denmark) Emil Grøndal 4.39
- (England) Tom Perry 3.95
- (England) Richard Hall 3.53
- (Czech Republic) Zdeněk Holub 2.99
- (England) Danny Halsey 0.36 (3 matches only)

Plymouth Devils

- (Australia) Brady Kurtz 7.65
- (Australia) Jack Holder 7.16
- (England) Kyle Newman 6.31
- (Denmark) Charlie Gjedde 6.12
- (Australia) Todd Kurtz 5.76
- (Denmark) Stefan Nielsen 5.53
- (Czech Republic) Zdeněk Simota 5.09
- (England) Steve Boxall 4.40
- (England) Ellis Perks 2.38

Redcar Bears

- (France) David Bellego 7.63
- (Australia) Hugh Skidmore 6.84
- (Denmark) Lasse Bjerre 6.64
- (Denmark) Jonas B. Andersen 6.30
- (Germany) Tobias Busch 4.66
- (Denmark) Simon Nielsen 4.19
- (England) Lee Payne 2.68
- (Australia) Jye Etheridge 2.06
- (Denmark) Jacob Bukhave 1.60

Rye House Rockets

- (England) Edward Kennett 9.27
- (England) Stuart Robson 7.09
- (Denmark) Kasper Lykke 5.16
- (Australia) Cameron Heeps 5.07
- (Australia) Robert Branford 4.60
- (England) Leigh Lanham 4.34
- (England) Ben Morley 3.85
- (Denmark) Peter Karger 1.62

Scunthorpe Scorpions

- (Australia) Ryan Douglas 7.18
- (England) Josh Auty 7.01
- (Denmark) Michael Palm Toft 6.98
- (England) Carl Wilkinson 6.12
- (England) Lewis Kerr 5.98
- (Denmark) Nicolai Klindt 5.42
- (England) Alex Davies 5.41
- (England) Ashley Morris 4.76
- (Austria) Fritz Wallner 3.83
- (Denmark) Andreas Lyager 3.38
- (Czech Republic) Zdeněk Holub 3.09
- (England) Josh Bailey 2.05

Sheffield Tigers

- (England) Jason Garrity 8.55
- (England) Simon Stead 8.39
- (England) Kyle Howarth 7.18
- (France) Dimitri Bergé 6.91
- (England) Josh Bates 5.02
- (Australia) Arthur Sissis 3.79
- (England) Richard Hall 3.29
- (England) Nathan Greaves 2.32

Somerset Rebels

- (Australia) Rohan Tungate 9.03
- (Australia) Josh Grajczonek 8.90
- (England) Paul Starke 6.62
- (England) Charles Wright 6.59
- (Australia) Jake Allen 5.96
- (New Zealand) Bradley Wilson-Dean 5.02
- (England) Zach Wajtknecht 2.63

Workington Comets

- (United States) Ricky Wells 7.92
- (Denmark) Claus Vissing 6.80
- (Denmark) Kenneth Hansen 6.74
- (Denmark) Rasmus Jensen 6.14
- (England) Adam Roynon 5.12
- (Australia) Mason Campton 4.67
- (England) Matt Williamson 3.67

== See also ==
- List of United Kingdom Speedway League Champions
- Knockout Cup (speedway)
