= 2025 FIM Long Track World Championship =

World motorcycle racing competition

2025 Individual Long Track World Championship
- Start date: 6 July
- End date: 21 September

The 2025 FIM Long Track World Championship was the 55th edition of the FIM Individual Long Track World Championship.

Martin Smolinski was the defending champion having won the title for the two previous years in 2023 and 2024.

Zach Wajtknecht and Chris Harris secured a 1-2 finish for Great Britain.

== Venues ==
Final	Date	Venue	Winner	Ref
1	6 July	(Germany) Rennbahn Mühldorf	(Germany) Martin Smolinski	
2	13 July	(France) Marmande Speedway	(England) Zach Wajtknecht	
3	24 August	(Germany) Eichenring Scheeßel	(England) Chris Harris	
4	21 September	(Netherlands) Speed Centre Roden	(Netherlands) Dave Meijerink	

== Final Classification ==
Pos	Rider	Final 1	Final 2	Final 3	Final 4	Total
1	(England) Zach Wajtknecht	19	21	13	19	72
2	(England) Chris Harris	13	17	21	17	68
3	(Germany) Lukas Fienhage	17	19	19	10	65
4	(Netherlands) Dave Meijerink	11	13	11	21	56
5	(Germany) Martin Smolinski	21	11	15	x	47
6	(France) Mathias Trésarrieu	9	10	8	15	42
7	(England) Andrew Appleton	7	9	17	3	36
8	(Netherlands) Mika Meijer	10	8	7	9	34
9	(Denmark) Kenneth Kruse Hansen	8	5	0	13	26
10	(Finland) Tero Aarnio	4	3	10	7	24
11	(France) Jordan Dubernard	3	15	5	x	23
12	(Germany) Stephan Katt	5	4	9	4	22
13	(Germany) Daniel Spiller	15	1	x	x	16
14	(Netherlands) Romano Hummel	x	x	x	11	11
15	(England) Jake Mulford	x	x	3	8	11
16	(France) Anthony Chauffour	x	7	x	x	7
17	(Germany) Jörg Tebbe	2	x	4	x	6
18	(Denmark) Patrick Kruse	x	x	x	5	5
19	(Netherlands) William Kruit	x	x	2	2	4
20	(France) Tino Bouin	x	2	x	x	2
21	(Germany) Mario Niedermaier	1	x	x	x	1
22	(Germany) Fabian Wachs	0	x	1	0	1
23	(Germany) Timo Wachs	x	x	0	1	1
24	(France) Thomas Valladon	x	0	x	x	0

== See also ==
- 2025 FIM Long Track of Nations
