= 2021 FIM Long Track World Championship =

International motorcycle racing competition

2021 Individual Long Track World Championship

The 2021 Individual Long Track World Championship is the 51st edition of the FIM speedway Individual Long Track World Championship.

The Championship will be decided by a series of five Grand Prix races. Once again the schedule was seriously disrupted due to the COVID-19 pandemic, as it had been during the 2020 Individual Long Track World Championship.

Romano Hummel of the Netherlands won the world Championship title after securing 13 points in round two. Dimitri Bergé who led after round 1, was unable to ride in round 2 because he had been a wildcard in round 1. The Frenchman was denied the chance of a title shot, which was extremely unfortunate. The second and final round was streamed live on YouTube.

== Venues ==
Round	Date	Venue
1	4 July	(Germany) Mühldorf (cancelled)
2	13 July	(France) Marmande
3	28 August	(Poland) Rzeszów
4	4 September	(France) Morizès (cancelled)
5	19 September	(Germany) Herxheim bei Landau/Pfalz (cancelled)

== Final classification ==
Pos	Num	Rider	Round 1	Round 2	Round 3	Round 4	Round 5	Total
1		(Netherlands) Romano Hummel	x	19	13	x	x	32
2		(Germany) Martin Smolinski	x	9	21	x	x	30
3		(Netherlands) Theo Pijper	x	17	7	x	x	24
4		(England) Chris Harris	x	13	10	x	x	23
5		(France) Dimitri Bergé	x	21	x	x	x	21
6		(Germany) Lukas Fienhage	x	5	17	x	x	22
7		(Czech Republic) Josef Franc	x	0	19	x	x	19
8		(Czech Republic) Hynek Štichauer	x	15	4	x	x	19
9		(Poland) Stanisław Burza	x	x	17	x	x	17
10		(Netherlands) Dave Meijerink	x	7	9	x	x	16
11		(England) James Shanes	x	11	2	x	x	13
12		(Denmark) Jacob Bukhave	x	10	3	x	x	13
13		(Germany) Max Dilger	x	x	11	x	x	11
14		(France) Gaétan Stella	x	1	8	x	x	9
15		(England) Zach Wajtknecht	x	3	5	x	x	8
16		(Germany) Bernd Diener	x	8	x	x	x	8
17		(France) Julien Cayre	x	4	x	x	x	4
18		(France) Jordan Dubernard	x	2	x	x	x	2
19		(Germany) Fabian Wachs	x	x	1	x	x	1
20		(Sweden) Thomas H. Jonasson	x	0	x	x	x	0
