= 2020 FIM Long Track World Championship =

Motorcycle racing competition

2020 Individual Long Track World Championship

The 2020 Individual Long Track/Grasstrack World Championship was the 50th edition of the FIM speedway Individual Long Track World Championship. There were only two Grand-Prix rounds due to the COVID-19 pandemic.

== Venues ==
| Round | Date | Venue |
|---|---|---|
| 1 | 5 September | (France) Morizès |
| 2 | 15 June | (Poland) Rzeszów |

== Final classification ==
| Pos | Num | Rider | Round 1 | Round 2 | Total Pts |
|---|---|---|---|---|---|
| 1 | 125 | (Germany) Lukas Fienhage | 25 | 22 | 47 |
| 2 | 333 | (Denmark) Kenneth Kruse Hansen | 12 | 25 | 37(*) |
| 3 | 56 | (France) Mathieu Trésarrieu | 22 | 15 | 37(*) |
| 4 | 125 | (England) Zach Wajtknecht | 15 | 17 | 32 |
| 5 | 666 | (Netherlands) Romano Hummel | 19 | 11 | 30 |
| 6 | 115 | (Netherlands) Theo Pijper | 17 | 9 | 26 |
| 7 | 93 | (England) James Shanes | 9 | 12 | 21 |
| 8 | 31 | (Germany) Max Dilger | 11 | 8 | 19 |
| 9 | 15 | (Poland) Stanisław Burza | | 19 | 19 |
| 10 | 37 | (England) Chris Harris | 8 | 10 | 18 |
| 11 | 444 | (Czech Republic) Josef Franc | 10 | 1 | 11 |
| 12 | 42 | (Germany) Stephan Katt | 5 | 3 | 8 |
| 13 | 16 | (Czech Republic) Martin Málek | 3 | 2 | 5 |
| 14 | 30 | (Sweden) Thomas H. Jonasson | | 5 | 5 |
| 15 | 27 | (France) Stephane Tresarrieu | 4 | | 4 |
| 16 | 95 | (Finland) Jesse Mustonen | | 4 | 4 |
| 17 | 104 | (France) Gaetan Stella | 2 | 0 | 2 |
| 18 | 15 | (France) Jerome Lespinasse | 1 | | 1 |
| 19 | 16 | (France) Gabriel Dubernard | NRS | | 0 |
| 20 | 17 | (France) Steven Goret | NRS | | 0 |
| 21 | 17 | (Czech Republic) Zdeněk Holub | | NSR | 0 |

Note: Kenneth Kruse Hansen beat Mathieu Trésarrieu in a run-off to take second overall.
