= 2019 FIM Long Track of Nations =

Speedway event

- Venue: Reiterwaldstadion
- Location: Vechta, Germany

The 2019 FIM Long Track of Nations was the 13th annual FIM Team Long Track World Championship and the first under its new name. The final took place on 7 September 2019 at the Reiterwaldstadion in Vechta, Germany.

== Results ==
- (Germany) Vechta
- 7 September 2019

Pos.	Team	Pts	riders
1	France	64	Mathieu Trésarrieu 25, Dimitri Bergé 24, David Bellego 15
2	Germany	59	Lukas Fienhage 24, Martin Smolinski 24, Max Dilger 11
3	Czech Republic	54	Josef Franc 24, Hynek Štichauer 19, Martin Málek 11
4	Great Britain	47	Chris Harris 19, Zach Wajtknecht 16, Edward Kennett 12
5	Netherlands	27	Theo Pijper 11, Dave Meijerink 10, Henry Van Der Steen 3, Lars Zandvliet 3
6	Sweden	18	Sebastian Aldén 6, Joel Andersson 6, Thomas H. Jonasson 5, Andreas Bergstrom 1

== See also ==
- 2019 Individual Long Track World Championship
- 2019 Speedway of Nations
