= 2018 Team Long Track World Championship =

The 2018 Team Long Track World Championship was the 12th annual FIM Team Long Track World Championship. The final took place on 1 September 2018 in Morizès, France.

== Results ==
- (France) Morizès
- 1 September 2018

Pos.	Team	Pts	riders
1	France	54	Dimitri Bergé 22, Mathieu Trésarrieu 19, David Bellego 12, Stéphane Trésarrieu 1
2	Great Britain	46	James Shanes 19, Chris Harris 16, Zach Wajtknecht 6, Adam Ellis 5
3	Germany	38	Lukas Fienhage 16, Jörg Tebbe 15, Danny Maassen 7, Jens Benneker 0
4	Netherlands	34	Theo Pijper 20, Dave Meijerink 10, Lars Zandvliet 4
5	Czech Republic	32	Josef Franc 20, Martin Malek 7, Michal Skurla 5
6	Sweden	21	Robin Aspegren 11, Anders Mellgren 9, Andreas Bergstrom 1

== See also ==
- 2018 Individual Long Track World Championship
- 2018 Speedway of Nations
