= 2018 FIM Long Track World Championship =

Motorcycle racing competition

2018 Individual Long Track World Championship

The 2018 Individual Long Track/Grasstrack World Championship is the 48th edition of the FIM speedway Individual Long Track World Championship.

== Venues ==
| Round | Date | Venue |
|---|---|---|
| 1 | 10 May | (Germany) Herxheim |
| 2 | 16 Jun | (France) La Réole |
| 3 | 15 Jul | (Netherlands) Roden |
| 4 | 19 Aug | (Netherlands) Eenrum |
| 5 | 30 Sep | (Germany) Mühldorf |

== Current Classification ==
| Pos | Rider | Round 1 | Round 2 | Round 3 | Round 4 | Round 5 | Total Pts |
|---|---|---|---|---|---|---|---|
| 1 | (Germany) Martin Smolinski | 20 | 9 | 28 | 25 | 27 | 109 |
| 2 | (France) Dimitri Bergé | 25 | 23 | 15 | 22 | 23 | 108 |
| 3 | (France) Mathieu Tresarrieu | 13 | 25 | 21 | 23 | 20 | 102 |
| 4 | (Czech Republic) Josef Franc | 14 | 16 | 22 | 15 | 10 | 77 |
| 5 | (England) James Shanes | 17 | 12 | 16 | 19 | 7 | 71 |
| 6 | (Netherlands) Theo Pijper | 7 | 9 | 18 | 14 | 16 | 64 |
| 7 | (Germany) Bernd Diener | 19 | 10 | 6 | 2 | 17 | 54 |
| 8 | (England) Chris Harris | 7 | 10 | 7 | 20 | 8 | 52 |
| 9 | (England) Richard Hall | 11 | 7 | 15 | 10 | 2 | 45 |
| 10 | (Germany) Max Dilger | 10 | | 12 | 9 | | 31 |
| 11 | (Germany) Michael Hartel | 9 | 15 | | | 6 | 30 |
| 12 | (Netherlands) Romano Hummel | 7 | 19 | | | | 26 |
| 13 | (Czech Republic) Hynek Štichauer | | | 4 | 10 | 10 | 24 |
| 14 | (Finland) Jesse Mustonen | 16 | 2 | | | | 18 |
| 15 | (Germany) Stephan Katt | 3 | 2 | 3 | 3 | 5 | 16 |
| 16 | (Sweden) Anders Mellgren | | | 2 | 2 | 11 | 15 |
| 17 | (Germany) Lukas Fienhage | 2 | | | | 12 | 14 |
| 18 | (France) Jerome Lespinasse | 1 | 4 | 6 | 2 | 1 | 14 |
| 19 | (France) Stephane Tresarrieu | | 14 | | | | 14 |
| 20 | (Netherlands) Dave Meijerink | | | 5 | 4 | | 9 |
| 21 | (Germany) Jorg Tebbe | | | | | 4 | 4 |
| 22 | (France) Anthony Chauffour | | 2 | | | | 2 |
| 23 | (France) Gabriel Dubernard | | 1 | | | | 1 |
