= 2015 FIM Long Track World Championship =

Motorcycle racing competition

2015 Individual Long Track World Championship

The 2015 Individual Long Track/Grasstrack World Championship was the 45th edition of the FIM speedway Individual Long Track World Championship.

The world title was won by Jannick de Jong of the Netherlands.

== Venues ==
Round	Date	Venue
1	14 May	(Germany) Herxheim
2	26 Aug	(Netherlands) Eenrum
3	12 Sep	(Germany) Vechta
4	19 Sep	(Germany) Mühldorf

== Final Classification ==
Pos	Rider	Round 1	Round 2	Round 3	Round 4	Total Pts
1	(Netherlands) Jannick de Jong	17	19	15	24	75
2	(Germany) Erik Riss	15	22	16	15	68
3	(France) Dimitri Bergé	18	12	11	23	64
4	(Netherlands) Theo Pijper	15	18	14	14	61
5	(Czech Republic) Josef Franc	7	20	10	16	53
6	(France) Mathieu Tresarrieu	20	–	8	22	50
7	(Finland) Joonas Kylmäkorpi	22	24	–	–	46
8	(England) Richard Hall	5	15	16	8	44
9	(Germany) Michael Hartel	18	–	18	–	36
10	(France) Stephane Tresarrieu	5	12	8	6	31
11	(England) Glen Phillips	3	9	5	12	29
12	(Germany) Jörg Tebbe	15	2	2	10	29
13	(Germany) Stephan Katt	3	4	10	10	27
14	(Germany) Kai Huckenbeck	x	4	9	10	23
15	(England) Andrew Appleton	7	4	6	4	21
16	(Netherlands) Dirk Fabriek	7	11	2	1	21
17	(Netherlands) Henry van der Steen	–	4	–	–	4
18	(France) Theo di Palma	–	–	-	4	4
19	(France) Alexander Dubrana	–	–	–	1	1
