= 2023 FIM Long Track World Championship =

World motorcycle racing competition

2023 Individual Long Track World Championship
- Start date: 18 May
- End date: 17 September

The 2023 FIM Long Track World Championship was the 53rd edition of the FIM Individual Long Track World Championship.

Mathieu Trésarrieu was the defending champion having won the title in 2022, but did not compete.

Germany's Martin Smolinski won the championship by seven points from Chris Harris, despite not winning a Grand Prix. It was the second time he won the title, having also triumphed in 2018. Kenneth Kruse Hansen completed the podium on countback, ahead of Zach Wajtknecht.

== Venues ==
Final	Date	Venue	Winner
1	18 May	(Germany) Herxheim bei Landau/Pfalz	(Czech Republic) Josef Franc
2	17 June	(Poland) Ostrów Wielkopolski	(England) Chris Harris
3	13 July	(France) Marmande	(England) Chris Harris
4	20 August	(Germany) Scheessel	(Denmark) Kenneth Kruse Hansen
5	2 September	(France) Morizès	(Netherlands) Romano Hummel
6	17 September	(Germany) Mühldorf	(Denmark) Kenneth Kruse Hansen

== Final classification ==
Pos	Rider	Final 1	Final 2	Final 3	Final 4	Final 5	Final 6	Total
1	(Germany) Martin Smolinski	13	19	19	17	19	19	106
2	(England) Chris Harris	10	21	21	19	17	11	99
3	(Denmark) Kenneth Kruse Hansen	2	17	3	21	13	21	77
4	(England) Zach Wajtknecht	19	13	17	4	9	15	77
5	(Netherlands) Romano Hummel	11	5	9	10	21	17	73
6	(Czech Republic) Josef Franc	21	11	7	2	10	13	64
7	(Denmark) Jakub Bukhave	9	7	11	11	11	5	54
8	(Germany) Lukas Fienhage	17	8	13	9	x	x	47
	(Czech Republic) Hynek Štichauer	1	15	10	3	8	10	47
10	(Netherlands) Dave Meijerink	x	3	15	5	15	7	45
11	(Netherlands) Mika Meijer	3	9	8	7	3	2	32
12	(Germany) Stephan Katt	8	2	1	13	2	3	29
	(Netherlands) Theo Pijper	7	4	5	8	1	4	29
14	(France) Gaétan Stella	15	1	x	x	7	1	24
15	(Finland) Tero Aarnio	x	x	4	0	4	9	17
16	(Germany) Erik Riss	x	x	x	15	x	x	15
17	(Poland) Stanisław Burza	x	10	x	x	x	x	10
18	(Germany) Jörg Tebbe	0	x	x	1	x	8	9
19	(Germany) Daniel Spiller	5	x	x	x	x	x	5
	(France) Jordan Dubernard	x	x	0	x	5	x	5
21	(Germany) Max Dilger	4	x	x	x	x	x	4
22	(France) Mathias Trésarrieu	x	x	2	x	x	x	2
23	(Germany) Fabian Wachs	x	x	x	0	x	x	0
