= European Grasstrack Championship =

European grasstrack event

- Category: Motorcycle Racing
- Country: Various
- Region: Europe
- Inaugural season: 1978

The European Grasstrack Championship is a motorcycle championship and is organised by FIM Europe. The first championship took place in 1978 at Hereford Racecourse, England, and was won by Chris Baybutt. The competitors qualified though two semi-finals. Don Godden of England won the first semi-final in Artigues de Lussac, France and Skjold Larsen of Denmark won the second in Stadskanaal, Netherlands.

== Medalists ==
| Year | Venue | First | Second | Third |
| 1978 | (England) Hereford | (United Kingdom) Chris Baybutt | (Germany) Franz Kolbeck | (United Kingdom) Don Godden |
| 1979 | (Netherlands) Assen | (United Kingdom) Gerald Short | (Germany) Gunther Brackland | (Netherlands) Tjalle Reitsma |
| 1980 | (Germany) Bad Waldsee | (Germany) Willi Stauch | (United Kingdom) Gerald Short | (Sweden) Sture Lindblom |
| 1981 | (France) Artigues de Lussac | (United Kingdom) Neil Farnish | (United Kingdom) Bernie Leigh | (Denmark) Skjold Larsen |
| 1982 | (Belgium) Damme | (United Kingdom) Jeremy Doncaster | (United Kingdom) Mike Beaumont | (Germany) Josef Maucher |
| 1983 | (Germany) Nandlstadt | (Germany) Christian Brandt | (Germany) Eric Schafferer | (United Kingdom) Gerald Short |
| 1984 | (Netherlands) Eenrum | (United Kingdom) Martin Hagon | (Czech Republic) Vaclav Verner | (Denmark) Kent Noer |
| 1985 | (France) La Reole | (United Kingdom) Clayton Williams | (Netherlands) Harm Horstede | (Denmark) Tommy Brock |
| 1986 | (Netherlands) Eenrum | (United Kingdom) Simon Cross | (United Kingdom) Steve Schofield | (Germany) Joachim Reitzel |
| 1987 | (Germany) Nandlstadt | (Czech Republic) Roman Matoušek | (Germany) Joachim Reitzel | (United Kingdom) Bob Dolman |
| 1988 | (Netherlands) Joure | (Germany) Frank Kehlenbeck | (United Kingdom) Will James | (Denmark) Kent Noer |
| 1989 | (France) La Reole | (Germany) Robert Barth | (Denmark) Kent Noer | (United Kingdom) John Bostin |
| 1990 | (Netherlands) Uithuizen | (Germany) Robert Barth | (Denmark) Kent Noer | (Netherlands) Henk Snijder |
| 1991 | (Germany) Werlte | (Russia) Rif Saitgareev | (Germany) Thomas Diehr | (United Kingdom) Trever Banks |
| 1992 | (Belgium) Alken | (Netherlands) Anne van der Helm | (Czech Republic) Vaclav Milik | (Netherlands) Paulus Ellens |
| 1993 | (Netherlands) Eenrum | (United Kingdom) Richard Musson | (Netherlands) Paulus Ellens | (Italy) Armando Dal Chiele |
| 1994 | (Germany) Cloppenburg | (Germany) Robert Barth | (Netherlands) Anne van der Helm | (United Kingdom) Steve Schofield |
| 1995 | (Netherlands) Joure | (United Kingdom) Kelvin Tatum | (Germany) Bernd Diener | (Netherlands) Anne van der Helm |
| 1996 | (France) Saint-Colomb-de-Lauzun | (Australia) Steve Johnston | (United Kingdom) Steve Schofield | (Czech Republic) Zdeněk Schneiderwind |
| 1997 | No championship | | | |
| 1998 | (Germany) Schwarme | (Czech Republic) Zdeněk Schneiderwind | (Russia) Oleg Kurguskin | (Italy) Massimo Mora |
| 1999 | (Germany) Werlte | (Germany) Bernd Diener | (Czech Republic) Zdeněk Schneiderwind | (Ukraine) Vladimir Trofimov |
| 2000 | (France) Saint-Colomb-de-Lauzun | (Czech Republic) Zdeněk Schneiderwind | (Netherlands) Uppie Bos | (Germany) Enrico Janoschka |
| 2001 | (Netherlands) Noordwolde | (Netherlands) Maik Groen | (Czech Republic) Zdeněk Schneiderwind | (Netherlands) Uppie Bos |
| 2002 | (Germany) Berghaupten | (Germany) Sirg Schutzbach | (Czech Republic) Zdeněk Schneiderwind | (Netherlands) Uppie Bos |
| 2003 | (France) La Reole | (Germany) Gerd Riss | (Germany) Herbert Rudolph | (Germany) Matthias Kroger |
| 2004 | (Netherlands) Eenrum | (Netherlands) Theo Pijper | (Germany) Gerd Riss | (Germany) Bernd Diener |
| 2005 | (Germany) Schwarme | (United Kingdom) Paul Hurry | (Netherlands) Dirk Fabriek | (United Kingdom) Andrew Appleton |
| 2006 | (France) La Reole | (Germany) Stephan Katt | (Netherlands) Theo Pijper | (Netherlands) Dirk Fabriek |
| 2007 | (England) Folkestone | (Netherlands) Theo Pijper | (Germany) Stephan Katt | (United Kingdom) Andrew Appleton |
| 2008 | (Netherlands) Siddeburen | (France) Stephane Tresarrieu | (Germany) Richard Speiser | (Finland) Rene Lehtinen |
| 2009 | (Germany) Berghaupten | (Germany) Stephan Katt | (France) Stephane Tresarrieu | (United Kingdom) Glen Phillips |
| 2010 | (France) La Reole | (United Kingdom) Andrew Appleton | (Netherlands) Theo Pijper | (Germany) Martin Smolinski |
| 2011 | (England) Wainfleet | (Germany) Martin Smolinski | (Netherlands) Jannick de Jong | (United Kingdom) Andrew Appleton |
| 2012 | (Netherlands) Eenrum | (Germany) Stephan Katt | (Netherlands) Dirk Fabriek | (Netherlands) Jannick de Jong |
| 2013 | (Germany) Bielefeld | (Netherlands) Jannick de Jong | (Netherlands) Dirk Fabriek | (Germany) Richard Speiser |
| 2014 | (France) St. Macaire | (Netherlands) Jannick de Jong | (United Kingdom) David Howe | (Germany) Enrico Janoschka |
| 2015 | (Netherlands) Staphorst | (Netherlands) Jannick de Jong | (United Kingdom) James Shanes | (Germany) Stephan Katt |
| 2016 | (England) Folkestone | (United Kingdom) James Shanes | (France) Mathieu Tresarrieu | (United Kingdom) Andrew Appleton |
| 2017 | (Germany) Hertingen | (United Kingdom) James Shanes | (United Kingdom) Andrew Appleton | (United Kingdom) Edward Kennett |
| 2018 | (France) Tayac | (France) Dimitri Berge | (Czech Republic) Josef Franc | (United Kingdom) Zach Wajtknecht |
| 2019 | (Germany) Bad Hersfeld | (United Kingdom) Zach Wajtknecht | (United Kingdom) Paul Hurry | (Denmark) Kenneth Hansen |
| 2020 | (France) Tayac | (France) Mathieu Tresarrieu | (Netherlands) Romano Hummel | (Netherlands) Dave Meijerink |
| 2021 | Cancelled due to the global Covid-19 pandemic. | | | |
| 2022 | (United Kingdom) Swingfield | (Netherlands) Romano Hummel | (United Kingdom) Chris Harris | (United Kingdom) Zach Wajtknecht |
| 2023 | (Germany) Werlte | (Netherlands) Romano Hummel | (United Kingdom) Chris Harris | (United Kingdom) Andrew Appleton |
| 2024 | (France) Tayac | (United Kingdom) Chris Harris | (Netherlands) Dave Meijerink | (Germany) Lukas Fienhage |

== Results by rider (up to and including 2024) ==
| Rider | First | Second | Third | Podium | Best Finish |
|---|---|---|---|---|---|
| (Germany) Stephan Katt | 3 | 1 | 1 | 5 | 2006, 2009, 2012 |
| (Netherlands) Jannick de Jong | 3 | 1 | 1 | 5 | 2013, 2014, 2015 |
| (Germany) Robert Barth | 3 | 0 | 0 | 3 | 1989, 1990, 1994 |
| (Czech Republic) Zdeněk Schneiderwind | 2 | 3 | 1 | 6 | 1998, 2000 |
| (Netherlands) Theo Pijper | 2 | 1 | 0 | 3 | 2004, 2007 |
| (England) James Shanes | 2 | 1 | 0 | 2 | 2016, 2017 |
| (Netherlands) Romano Hummel | 2 | 1 | 0 | 3 | 2022, 2023 |
| (England) Chris Harris | 1 | 2 | 0 | 3 | 2024 |
| (England) Andrew Appleton | 1 | 1 | 5 | 7 | 2010 |
| (England) Gerald Short | 1 | 1 | 1 | 3 | 1979 |
| (Netherlands) Anne van der Helm | 1 | 1 | 1 | 3 | 1992 |
| (Germany) Bernd Diener | 1 | 1 | 1 | 3 | 1999 |
| (Germany) Gerd Riss | 1 | 1 | 0 | 2 | 2003 |
| (England) Paul Hurry | 1 | 1 | 0 | 2 | 2005 |
| (Germany) Martin Smolinski | 1 | 0 | 1 | 2 | 2011 |
| (England) Zach Wajtknecht | 1 | 0 | 1 | 2 | 2019 |
| (England) Chris Baybutt | 1 | 0 | 0 | 1 | 1978 |
| (Germany) Willie Stauch | 1 | 0 | 0 | 1 | 1980 |
| (England) Neil Farnish | 1 | 0 | 0 | 1 | 1981 |
| (England) Jeremy Doncaster | 1 | 0 | 0 | 1 | 1982 |
| (Germany) Christian Brandt | 1 | 0 | 0 | 1 | 1983 |
| (England) Martin Hagon | 1 | 0 | 0 | 1 | 1984 |
| (England) Clayton Williams | 1 | 0 | 0 | 1 | 1985 |
| (England) Simon Cross | 1 | 0 | 0 | 1 | 1986 |
| (Czech Republic) Roman Matousek | 1 | 0 | 0 | 1 | 1987 |
| (Germany) Frank Kehlenbeck | 1 | 0 | 0 | 1 | 1988 |
| (Russia) Rif Saigareev | 1 | 0 | 0 | 1 | 1991 |
| (England) Richard Musson | 1 | 0 | 0 | 1 | 1993 |
| (England) Kelvin Tatum | 1 | 0 | 0 | 1 | 1995 |
| (Russia) Steve Johnson | 1 | 0 | 0 | 1 | 1996 |
| (Netherlands) Maik Groen | 1 | 0 | 0 | 1 | 2001 |
| (Germany) Sirg Schutzbach | 1 | 0 | 0 | 1 | 2002 |
| (France) Stephane Tresarrieu | 1 | 0 | 0 | 1 | 2008 |
| (France) Dimitri Berge | 1 | 0 | 0 | 1 | 2018 |
| (France) Mathieu Tresarrieu | 1 | 0 | 1 | 2 | 2020 |

== Results by country ==
| Team | First | Second | Third | Podium |
|---|---|---|---|---|
| England | 15 | 12 | 15 | 42 |
| Germany | 13 | 10 | 10 | 33 |
| Netherlands | 9 | 11 | 8 | 28 |
| Czech Republic | 3 | 6 | 2 | 11 |
| France | 3 | 2 | 0 | 5 |
| Russia | 1 | 1 | 0 | 2 |
| Australia | 1 | 0 | 0 | 1 |
| Denmark | 0 | 2 | 5 | 7 |
| Italy | 0 | 0 | 2 | 2 |
| Sweden | 0 | 0 | 1 | 1 |
| Ukraine | 0 | 0 | 1 | 1 |
| Finland | 0 | 0 | 1 | 1 |

== See also ==
- European Grasstrack Sidecar Championship
