= 2023 FIM Long Track of Nations =

2023 Speedway event

The 2023 FIM Long Track of Nations was the 15th annual FIM Team Long Track World Championship. The final took place on 24 September 2023 in Roden, Netherlands.

The Netherlands won the event for a fourth time, with 2021 individual World Long Track champion Romano Hummel winning all six of his races for a maximum 30 points. Dave Meijerink, Mika Meijer and Jannick de Jong completed the successful quartet.

Nine-time champions Germany finished second, with Erik Riss top scoring, while Great Britain completed the podium.

== Results ==
- (Netherlands) Roden
- 24 September 2023

Pos.	Team	Pts	riders
1	Netherlands	64	Romano Hummel 30, Dave Meijerink 17, Mika Meijer 10, Jannick de Jong 7
2	Germany	57	Erik Riss 29, Martin Smolinski 18, Jörg Tebbe 9, Stephan Katt 1
3	Great Britain	49	Chris Harris 25, Zach Wajtknecht 12, Andrew Appleton 12
4	Finland	44	Henri Ahlbom 16, Tero Aarnio 14, Jesse Mustonen 13, Topi Mustonen 1
5	Czech Republic	36	Hynek Štichauer 18, Josef Franc 13, Jan Macek 5
6	Denmark	35	Jacob Bukhave 23, Tobias Thomsen 12, Morten Qvistgaard 0
7	France	29	Mathias Trésarrieu 10, Jordan Dubernard 8, Steven Labouyrie 8, Gaétan Stella 3

== See also ==
- 2023 Individual Long Track World Championship
