= 2019 Speedway of Nations =

International motorcycle speedway team competition

The 2019 Speedway of Nations was the second FIM Speedway of Nations. The competition consisted of two race-off events and a two-legged final. The event was won by Russia for the second consecutive year. They beat Poland in the Grand Final with Australia taking the bronze medal.

== Format ==
The 2019 Speedway of Nations was a pairs event, with each nation being represented by two senior riders and one rider under the age of 21. Each meeting was staged over 21 heats with the scores from each rider added together to give a total for each nation.

The two race-off events consisted of seven teams, with three qualifying for the final. The final, which included hosts and defending champions Russia, was staged over two legs with the scores from each added together. The top scoring nation went straight through to the Grand Final, while the second and third placed nations competed in the final qualifier for the chance to reach the Grand Final. The final qualifier and Grand Final were one-off heats.

The winner of the Grand Final determined the overall winner of the 2019 Speedway of Nations.

== Race Off 1 ==
- (Germany) Landshut
- May 4

1st	2nd	3rd
Sweden - 25; Fredrik Lindgren - 18; Peter Ljung - 6 Filip Hjelmland - 1	Poland - 24; Bartosz Zmarzlik - 15; Patryk Dudek - 7 Bartosz Smektała - 2	Germany - 20; Martin Smolinski - 11; Kai Huckenbeck - 8 Michael Hartel - 1

4th	5th	6th	7th
Slovenia - 19; Matej Žagar - 13; Matic Ivačič - 4 Nick Škorja - 2	Czech Republic - 19; Václav Milík Jr. - 16; Eduard Krčmář - 2 Jan Kvěch - 1	Ukraine - 10; Stanislav Melnychuk - 8 Marko Levishyn - 7 Andrii Rozaliuk - DNR	Italy - 9 Nicolás Covatti - 9 Michele Paco Castagna - 0 Michele Menani - 0

== Race Off 2 ==
- (England) Manchester
- May 11

1st	2nd	3rd
Great Britain - 26; Tai Woffinden - 12; Craig Cook - 8 Robert Lambert - 6	Australia - 22; Max Fricke - 12; Chris Holder - 9 Jaimon Lidsey - 1	Denmark - 22; Niels-Kristian Iversen - 15; Leon Madsen - 5 Frederik Jakobsen - 2

4th	5th	6th	7th
France - 16; David Bellego - 10; Dimitri Bergé - 6 Gaétan Stella - 0	United States - 16; Luke Becker - 11; Broc Nicol - 4 Austin Novratil - 1	Latvia - 16; Andžejs Ļebedevs - 14; Jevgeņijs Kostigovs - 2 Oļegs Mihailovs - 0	Finland - 9 Tero Aarnio - 8 Jesse Mustonen - 0 Timi Salonen - 0

== Final ==
- (Russia) Tolyatti, Anatoly Stepanov Stadium

=== First leg ===
- July 20

1st	2nd	3rd
Australia - 23; Jason Doyle - 16; Max Fricke - 5 Jaimon Lidsey - 2	Russia - 22; Emil Sayfutdinov - 17; Artem Laguta - 4 Gleb Chugunov - 1	Poland - 21; Bartosz Zmarzlik - 17; Maksym Drabik - 4 Maciej Janowski - 0

4th	5th	6th	7th
Denmark - 19; Leon Madsen - 13; Frederik Jakobsen - 4 Niels-Kristian Iversen - 2	Sweden - 16; Fredrik Lindgren - 9 Peter Ljung - 7 Filip Hjelmland - 0	Germany - 14; Kai Huckenbeck - 9 Erik Riss - 5 Lukas Fienhage - 0	Great Britain - 10; Craig Cook - 6 Robert Lambert - 2 Chris Harris - 2

=== Second leg ===
- July 21

1st	2nd	3rd
Poland - 26; Bartosz Zmarzlik - 18; Patryk Dudek - 6 Maksym Drabik - 2	Russia - 23; Emil Sayfutdinov - 14; Artem Laguta - 8 Gleb Chugunov - 1	Sweden - 19; Fredrik Lindgren - 10; Peter Ljung - 9 Filip Hjelmland - 0

4th	5th	6th	7th
Australia - 18; Jason Doyle - 14; Max Fricke - 4 Jaimon Lidsey - 0	Denmark - 18; Leon Madsen - 11; Frederik Jakobsen - 5 Niels-Kristian Iversen - 2	Germany - 16; Kai Huckenbeck - 11; Erik Riss - 5 Lukas Fienhage - 0	Great Britain - 6 Craig Cook - 4 Chris Harris - 2 Robert Lambert - DNR

=== Total ===
1st	2nd	3rd
Poland - 47; Bartosz Zmarzlik - 35; Patryk Dudek - 6 Maksym Drabik - 6 Maciej Janowski - 0	Russia - 45; Emil Sayfutdinov - 31; Artem Laguta - 12; Gleb Chugunov - 2	Australia - 41; Jason Doyle - 30; Max Fricke - 9 Jaimon Lidsey - 2

4th	5th	6th	7th
Denmark - 37; Leon Madsen - 24; Frederik Jakobsen - 9 Niels-Kristian Iversen - 4	Sweden - 35; Fredrik Lindgren - 19; Peter Ljung - 16; Filip Hjelmland - 0	Germany - 30; Kai Huckenbeck - 20; Erik Riss - 10; Lukas Fienhage - 0	Great Britain - 16; Craig Cook - 10; Chris Harris - 4 Robert Lambert - 2

=== Grand Final Qualifier ===
1st	2nd
Russia - 3 Artem Laguta - 2 Emil Sayfutdinov - 1	Australia - 3 Jason Doyle - 3 Max Fricke - 0

=== Grand Final ===
1st	2nd
Russia - 5 Emil Sayfutdinov - 3 Artem Laguta - 2	Poland - 1 Bartosz Zmarzlik - 1 Patryk Dudek - 0

== See also ==
- 2019 Speedway Grand Prix
- motorcycle speedway
- 2019 in sports
