= Mathieu Trésarrieu =

French motorcycle speedway rider (born 1986)

- Born: 2 March 1986 (age 40); Bordeaux, France

Career history
- 2001–2002: Isle of Wight Islanders
- 2005: Reading Racers
- 2006–2007: Redcar Bears
- 2010: Peterborough Panthers
- 2011: Leicester Lions
- 2011–2012: Ipswich Witches
- 2014: Rye House Rockets

Individual honours
- 2017, 2022: World Longtrack Champion
- 2004, 2007, 2018: French Speedway Champion
- 2020: European Grasstrack Champion
- 2009, 2016: French Grasstrack Champion

Team honours
- 2018, 2019: World Longtrack Team champion
- 2022: World Longtrack Team bronze
- 2011: Premier League Fours

Mathieu "Mat" Trésarrieu (born 2 March 1986) is a French motorcycle speedway rider who competes in Speedway, Longtrack and Grasstrack. He is a two-time World Longtrack Champion and is a three-time speedway champion of France. He earned two caps for the France national speedway team.

== Biography ==
Trésarrieu was born in Bordeaux in 1986, and took up speedway at the age of twelve. His two older brothers Stéphane and Sebastien are also speedway riders. He won the French national championship for the first time in 2002. Between 2002 and 2003, he rode for the Isle of Wight Islanders in seven matches, but only got a regular league place in 2005 when he rode in forty matches for Reading Racers at an average score of 5.6.

In 2006, Trésarrieu was named as number 8 for Oxford Cheetahs but moved on to Redcar Bears, where he stayed for two seasons, averaging over seven in each. He won the French title for a second time in 2007, and (after missing the 2008 season through injury) for a third time in 2009. He also finished third in the Individual Speedway Long Track World Championship in 2007. He returned to British speedway in 2010 in the Elite League with Peterborough Panthers, but failed to get a starting place at the start of the 2011 season. An injury to Ilya Bondarenko gave him an opportunity with Leicester Lions, and later in 2011, he signed for Ipswich Witches to replace the injured Chris Schramm, riding as part of the team that won the Premier League Four-Team Championship at Leicester.

Trésarrieu re-joined Ipswich in 2012, electing to focus on speedway, rather than grass and long track racing.

In 2018, Trésarrieu was part of the French team, along with Dimitri Bergé, Stéphane Trésarrieu and David Bellego, that won the 2018 Team Long Track World Championship. The following season, in 2019, he was part of the French team again, along with Bergé and Bellego, that won the 2019 Team Long Track World Championship.

In 2022, Trésarrieu won his second individual World Longtrack title, finishing 28 points clear of Zach Wajtknecht in the 2022 Individual Long Track World Championship. Additionally in 2022, he was part of the French team, along with Stéphane Trésarrieu and Mathias Trésarrieu, that won the bronze medal at the 2022 Team Long Track World Championship.

In 2023, Trésarrieu was part of the French team that competed at the 2023 Speedway World Cup in Poland.

== World Longtrack Championship ==
=== Grand-Prix Series ===
Year	GP	Points	Pos	GP Wins	GP Podiums
2004	NSR	0	0	0	0
2005	1	16	19	0	0
2006	3	46	5	0	1
2007	3	42	3rd	1	0
2008	DNC	0	0	0	0
2009	5	72	8	0	2
2010	6	91	6	0	1
2011	6	90	5	0	1
2012	1	14	26	0	0
2013	6	81	8	0	1
2014	4	64	5	0	2
2015	3	50	6	0	1
2016	5	84	3rd	0	2
2017	5	101	1st	1	2
2018	5	102	3rd	1	3
2019	5	101	3rd	1	2
2020	2	37	3rd	0	1
2022	6	116	1st	3	2

Best results

- (Finland) Forssa Third 2016
- (Germany) Herxheim bei Landau/Pfalz First 2019, Second 2014, 2017
- (France) La Réole First 2007, 2018
- (France) Marmande First 2007, Third 2011
- (France) Morizès Second 2009, 2013, 2014, 2015, 2016, 2019, 2020
- (Germany) Mühldorf Third 2017, 2018, 2019
- (Germany) Vechta Second 2009, 2010
- (France) Saint-Macaire Third 2006
- (Netherlands) Roden Second 2018
- (Netherlands) Eenrum Second 2018

== European Grasstrack Championship ==
Finals

- 2003 (France) La Réole (NSR)
- 2004 (Netherlands) Eenrum (18th) 6pts
- 2006 (France) La Réole (NS)
- 2007 (England) Folkestone (NS)
- 2013 (Germany) Bielefeld (10th) 12pts
- 2014 (France) Saint-Macaire (5th) 17pts
- 2016 (England) Folkestone (Second) 19pts
- 2017 (Germany) Hertingen (16th) 3pts
- 2018 (France) Tayac (5th) 16pts
- 2019 (Germany) Bad Hersfeld (10th) 12pts
- 2020 (France) Tayac (First) 19pts
