= French Individual Speedway Championship =

Motorcycle speedway championship

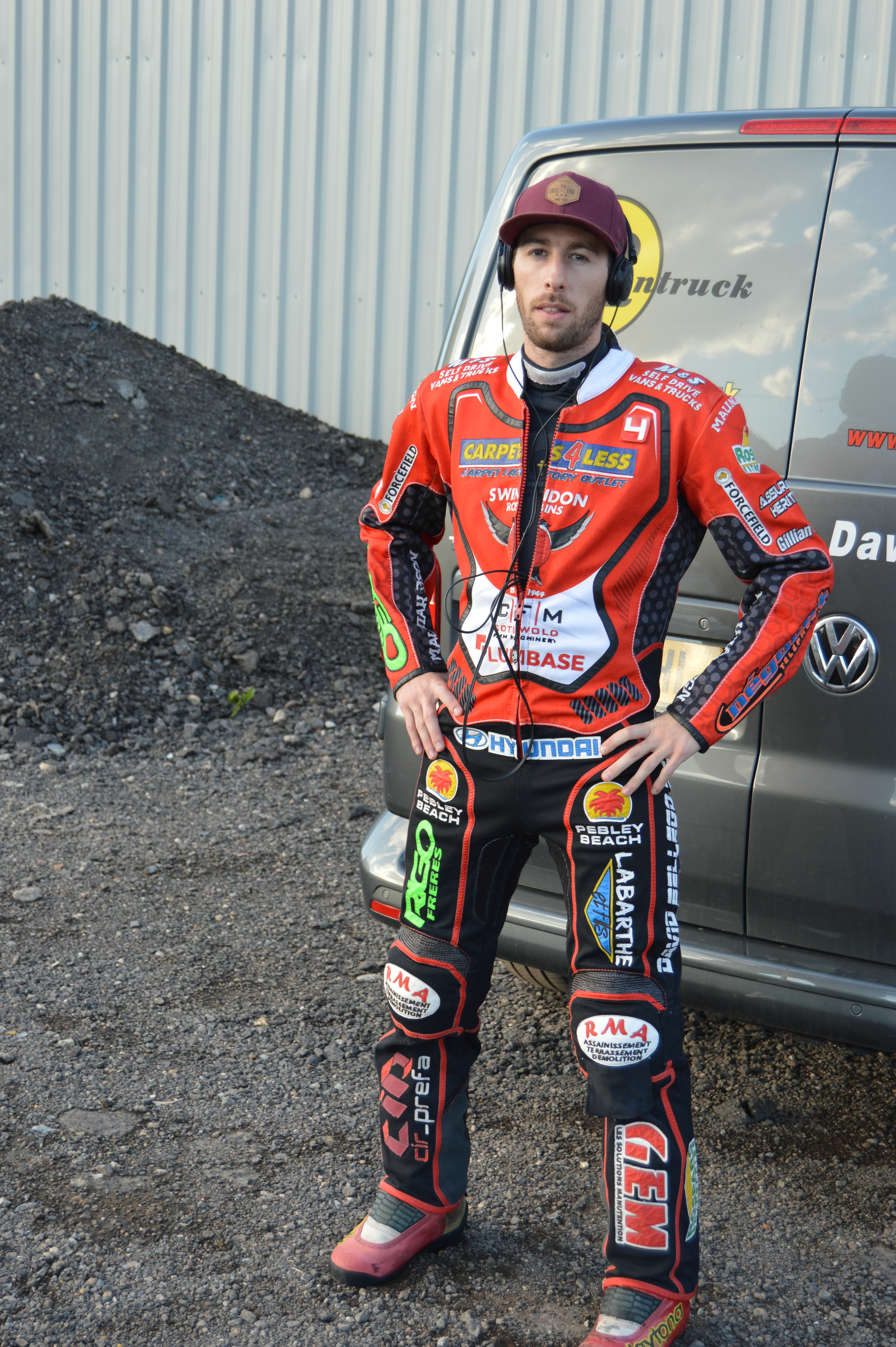
- David Bellego, four times champion
- Sport: Motorcycle speedway
- Founded: 1928
- Most titles: Charles Bellissent (6)

The French Individual Speedway Championship is a Motorcycle speedway championship held each year to determine the French national champion. It was first staged in 1928.

== Winners ==
Year	Winner
1928	Charles Bellissent
1929	Fernand Meynier
1930	Fernand Meynier
1931	Charles Bellissent
1932	Charles Bellissent
1933	Charles Bellissent
1934	Leon Boulard
1935	Charles Bellissent
1936	Leon Boulard
1948	Charles Bellissent
1950	Jean Landru
1953	Robert Fluimani
1957	Ted Connor (Great Britain)
1958	Keith Morrison (Great Britain)
1959	Claude Boston
1960	Jean Du Bardine
1961	Ray Liston (Australia)
1962	Roger Begasse
1976	Bernard Tison
1977	Bernard Tison
1978	Bernard Tison
1980	Bernard Tison
1984	Patrice Blondy
1987	Thierry Hilaire
1989	Patrice Blondy
1992	Christophe Dubernard
1996	Philippe Bergé
2004	Mathieu Trésarrieu
2007	Mathieu Trésarrieu
2008	Theo Pijper (Netherlands)
2009	Stéphane Trésarrieu
2010	David Bellego
2011	Stéphane Trésarrieu
2013	Philippe Ostyn
2014	Garbiel Dubernard
2015	Richard De Biasi
2016	Stéphane Trésarrieu
2017	Gaetan Stella
2018	Mathieu Trésarrieu
2019	Ondřej Smetana (Czech Republic)
2020	David Bellego
2021	David Bellego
2022	David Bellego
2023	Dimitri Bergé
