= 2025 FIM Long Track of Nations =

2025 Speedway event

- Venue: Reiterwaldstadion
- Location: Vechta, Germany

The 2025 FIM Long Track of Nations was the 17th annual FIM Team Long Track World Championship. The final took place on 14 September 2025 at the Reiterwaldstadion in Vechta, Germany. Great Britain won the event for the second time, while defending champions Netherlands finished third.

The final had been set for 13 September but was held the following day due to heavy rain.

== Results ==
- (Germany) Reiterwaldstadion, Vechta
- 14 September 2025

Pos.	Team	Pts	riders
1	Great Britain	56	Zach Wajtknecht 26, Chris Harris 17, Andrew Appleton 13
2	Netherlands	49	Romano Hummel 18, Dave Meijerink 17, Mika Meijer 14
3	Germany	48	Lukas Fienhage 23, Stephan Katt 13, Mario Niedermeier 12
4	Denmark	43	Kenneth Hansen 26, Jacob Bukhave 16, Patrick Kruse 3
5	Czech Republic	40	Hynek Štichauer 16, Jan Macek 14, Daniel Klíma 10, Jan Hlacina 0
6	France	39	Mathias Trésarrieu 27, Anthony Chauffour 7, Jordan Dubernard 5,
7	Finland	35	Jesse Mustonen 25, Tero Aarnio 10

== See also ==
- 2025 FIM Long Track World Championship
