= Denmark national long track team =

Denmark
- Association: Danish Motor Union
- FIM code: DMU
- Nation Colour: Red and White

World Championship
Team	0	0	0
Individual	4	4	7

The Denmark national long track team is the national long track motorcycle racing team of Denmark and is controlled by the Danish Motor Union (DMU). The team reached its first final at the 14th edition of Team Long Track World Championship in 2022.

== Longtrack of Nations ==
Year	Venue	Placing	Pts	Riders	Ref
2022	(Germany) Herxheim	6	22	Kenneth Kruse Hansen 12, Jacob Bukhave 10	
2023	(Netherlands) Roden	6	35	Jacob Bukhave 23, Tobias Thomsen 12, Morten Qvistgaard 0	
2024	(France) Morizès	5	34	Jacob Bukhave 14, Kenneth Hansen 13, Patrick Kruse 7	
2025	(Germany) Vechta	4	43	Kenneth Hansen 26, Jacob Bukhave 16, Patrick Kruse 3	

== World individual champions and medallists ==
- Erik Gundersen (world champion 1984, 1986),
- Kurt W. Petersen (world champion 1964), (silver 1963, 1966), (bronze 1968, 1969)
- Ole Olsen (world champion 1973), (silver 1976), (bronze 1975, 1977, 1979)
- Kenneth Kruse Hansen (silver 2020), (bronze 2023)
- Jan O. Pedersen (bronze 1991)
