= David Bellego =

French motorcycle racer

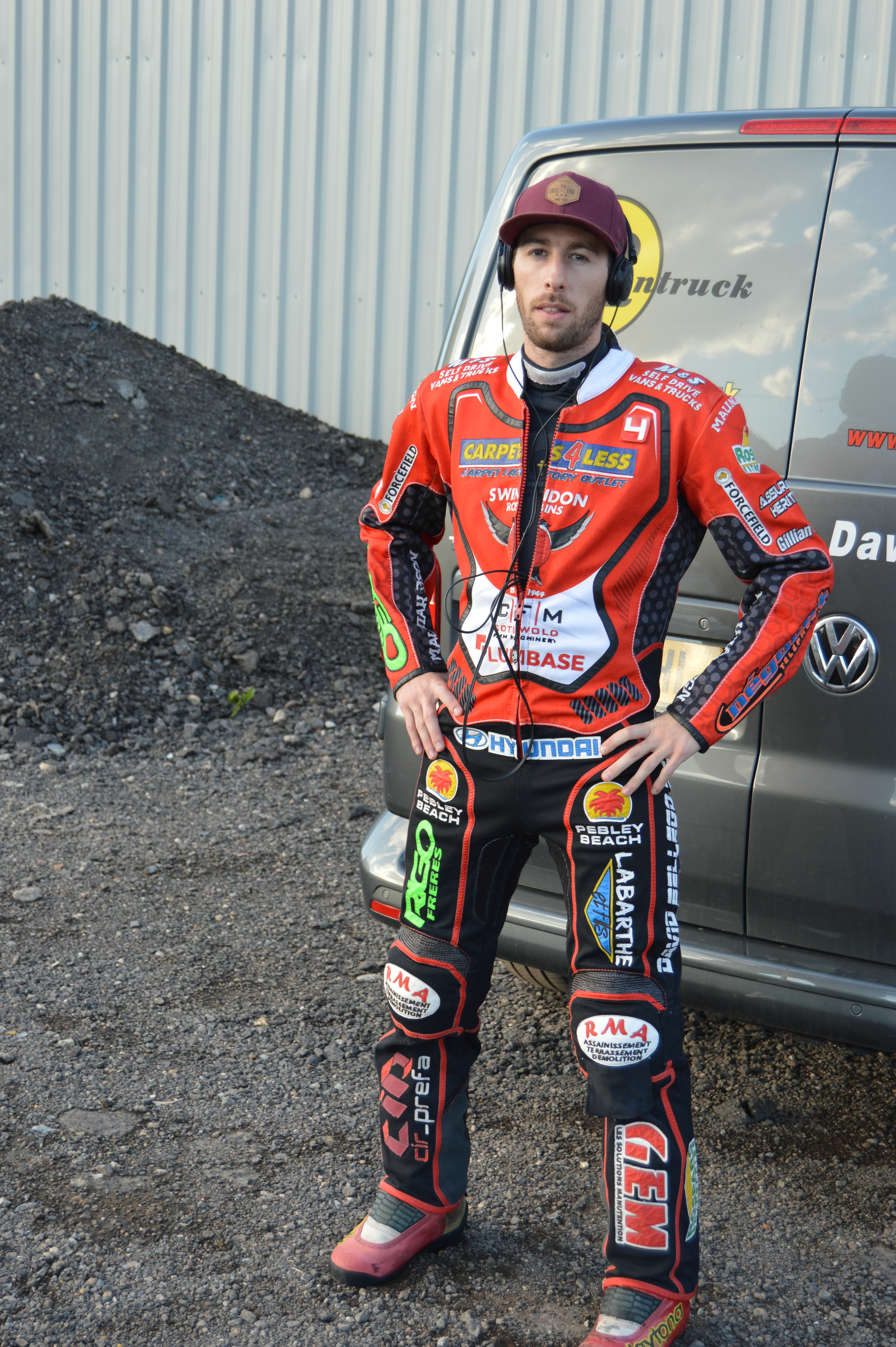
- Born: 15 May 1993 (age 33); Marmande, France
- Nationality: French
- Website: davidbellego415.com

Career history

Great Britain
- 2011: Glasgow
- 2012–2014: Berwick
- 2015, 2023: Sheffield
- 2016: Redcar
- 2017–2019: Swindon
- 2019: Ipswich

Poland
- 2017: Krosno
- 2020, 2023: Bydgoszcz
- 2022: Leszno
- 2024: Tarnów
- 2025: Rzeszów

Sweden
- 2019-2021: Masarna
- 2022: Indianerna
- 2023: Västervik
- 2024: Dackarna

Denmark
- 2016–2017, 2021, 2024: Grindsted
- 2025: Fjelsted

Individual honours
- 2010, 2020, 2021, 2022: French Champion

Team honours
- 2018, 2019: Team Long Track World Champion
- 2012: Four-Team Championship winner
- 2017, 2023: SGB Premiership

David Bellego (born 15 May 1993) is a French motorcycle speedway rider who competes in Grasstrack, Longtrack and Speedway. He is four-time champion of France.

== Speedway career ==
=== International ===
Bellego was part of the French team that won the bronze medal at the 2012 Team Long Track World Championship. Six years later, he became a world champion after scoring 12 points as part of the winning team for 2018 Team Long Track World Championship. The following year, he helped France successfully defend the 2019 Team Long Track World Championship. He also participated in the Individual Speedway European Championship four times in 2019, 2020, 2021 and 2022.

In 2022, Bellego won his fourth French Individual Speedway Championship.

=== Club ===
In 2012, Bellego was part of the Berwick Bandits side that won the Premier League Four-Team Championship. In 2016, he rode for Redcar Bears and in 2017, Bellego competed full-time in the top division of British Speedway for the first time with Swindon Robins when they won the League Championship and was retained for the 2018 season.

In 2020, Bellego won the Swedish league with Masarna during the 2020 Swedish speedway season. In 2023, he signed for Sheffield Tigers for the SGB Premiership 2023, having previously ridden for them in 2015. He helped them win the league title.

== Major results ==
=== World Team Championships ===
- 2018 Speedway of Nations - =10th
- 2019 Speedway of Nations - =8th
- 2021 Speedway of Nations - 5th
- 2022 Speedway of Nations - 8th

=== World Individual Longtrack Championship ===
- 2011 18th, 23pts

=== World Longtrack Team Championship ===
- 2012 (France) Saint-Macaire (Third) 3/42pts (Rode with Mathieu Trésarrieu, Gabrial Dubernard, Stéphane Trésarrieu)
- 2018 (France) Morizès (Champion) 12/54pts (rode with Mathieu Trésarrieu, Dimitri Bergé, Stéphane Trésarrieu)
- 2019 (Germany) Vechta (Champion) 15/64pts (rode with Mathieu Trésarrieu, Dimitri Bergé)
