= Les Artigues-de-Lussac =

- Commune
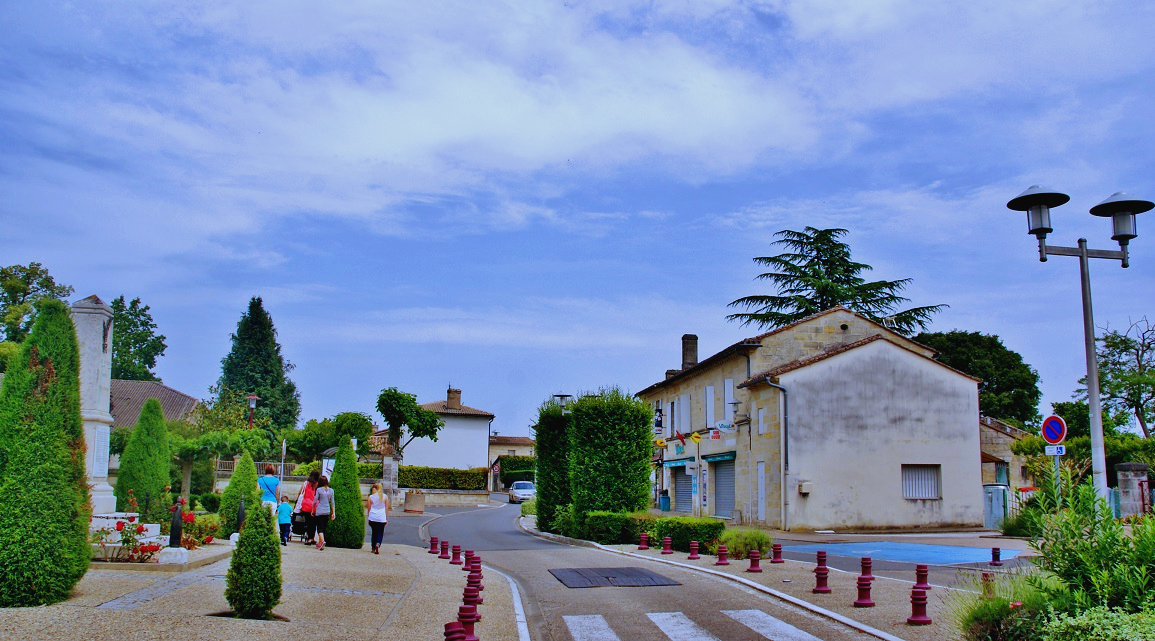
- The centre of Les Artigues-de-Lussac

- Coat of arms
- Location of Les Artigues-de-Lussac
- Location within France Location within Nouvelle-Aquitaine
- Coordinates: 44°58′20″N 0°08′18″W
- Country: France
- Region: Nouvelle-Aquitaine
- Department: Gironde
- Arrondissement: Libourne
- Canton: Le Nord-Libournais

Government
  - Mayor (2020–2026): Jean-Pierre Quet
- Area^{1}: 10.16 km^{2} (3.92 sq mi)
- Elevation: 47 m (154 ft)
- Highest elevation: 66 m (217 ft)
- Lowest elevation: 18 m (59 ft)
- Population (2023): 1,119
  - Density: 110.1/km^{2} (285.3/sq mi)
- Time zone: UTC+01:00 (CET)
  - Summer (DST): UTC+02:00 (CEST)
- INSEE/Postal code: 33014 /33570
- ^{1} French Land Register data, which excludes lakes, ponds, glaciers > 1 km^{2} (0.386 sq mi or 247 acres) and river estuaries.

Les Artigues-de-Lussac (Occitan: Las Artigas de Lussac) is a commune in the Gironde department in southwestern France. It is around 10 km northeast of Libourne, and around 35 km east-northeast of Bordeaux.

== Population ==
Historical population
Year	Pop.	±% p.a.
1968	609	—
1975	683	+1.65%
1982	893	+3.90%
1990	895	+0.03%
1999	972	+0.92%
2007	1,019	+0.59%
2012	1,073	+1.04%
2017	1,108	+0.64%
2023	1,119	+0.16%
Source: INSEE

== See also ==
- Communes of the Gironde department
