= Stéphane Trésarrieu =

French motorcycle racer

- Born: 27 February 1975 (age 51); Bordeaux, France

Career history
- 2003: Isle of Wight
- 2017: Mâcon
- 2018: Morizès

Individual honours
- 2009, 2011, 2016: French Speedway Champion
- 2008: European Grasstrack Champion
- 1995, 2001, 2002, 2003, 2004, 2005, 2011, 2014: French Grasstrack Champion

Team honours
- 2018: World Longtrack Team champion
- 2022: World Longtrack Team bronze

Stéphane Trésarrieu (born 27 February 1975) is a French former motorcycle racer, who competed in Grasstrack, Longtrack and motorcycle speedway. He is a three-time speedway champion of France and eight-time grasstrack champion of France. He earned seven caps for the France national speedway team.

== Career ==
Stéphane raced in Britain in 2003, when he rode for the Isle of Wight Islanders during the 2003 Premier League speedway season. He was the French Speedway Champion in 2009, 2011, and 2016.

In 2018, Trésarrieu was part of the French team, along with Dimitri Bergé, Mathieu Trésarrieu and David Bellego, that won the 2018 Team Long Track World Championship. In 2021, he opened his own workshop for motorcycles and bicycles.

In 2022, Trésarrieu was part of the French team, along with Mathieu Trésarrieu and Mathias Trésarrieu, that won the bronze medal at the 2022 Team Long Track World Championship.

== Family ==
Trésarrieu has two brothers who also compete in motorcycle racing, they are Mathieu Trésarrieu and Sebastien Trésarrieu. His son Mathias Trésarrieu also rides.

== World Longtrack Championship ==
=== Grand-Prix Years ===
- 1998 - 1 app (23rd) 7pts
- 2000 - 5 apps (13th) 30pts
- 2001 - 4 apps (5th) 46pts
- 2002 - 3 apps (13th) 31pts
- 2003 - 5 apps (13th) 44pts
- 2004 - 5 apps (16th) 27pts
- 2005 - 1 app (20th) 14pts
- 2006 - 3 apps (6th) 34pts
- 2007 - 3 apps (15th) 18pts
- 2008 - 3 apps (8th) 37pts
- 2009 - 5 apps (Second) 83pts
- 2010 - 4 apps (17th) 23pts
- 2011 - 6 apps (7th) 75pts
- 2012 - 5 apps (13th) 43pts
- 2013 - 6 apps (11th) 75pts
- 2014 - 4 apps (7th) 44pts
- 2015 - 4 apps (10th) 31pts
- 2016 - 1 app (21st) 2pts
- 2017 - 2 apps (14th) 25pts

=== Best Grand-Prix Results ===
- (France) Morizès First 2011, Third 2009
- (France) Marmande Second 2009
- (France) Saint-Colomb-de-Lauzun Third 2002

=== Team Championship ===
- 2007 (France) Morizès (Third) 18/39pts (Rode with Mathieu Trésarrieu, Christophe Dubernard, Phillipe Ostyn)
- 2008 (Germany) Werlte (6th) 16/27pts (Rode with Jerome Lespinasse, Theo di Palma)
- 2009 (Netherlands) Eenrum (Third) 19/19pts (Rode with Mathieu Trésarrieu, Phillipe Ostyn, Jerome Lespinasse)
- 2010 (Germany) Morizès (Second) 22/47pts (Rode with Mathieu Trésarrieu, Theo di Palma, Jerome Lespinasse)
- 2011 (Germany) Scheeßel (5th) 8/34pts (Rode with Mathieu Trésarrieu, Theo di Palma, Jerome Lespinasse)
- 2012 (France) Saint-Macaire (Third) 20/42pts (Rode with Mathieu Trésarrieu, Gabrial Dubernard, David Bellego)
- 2013 (England) Folkestone (Second) 16/57pts (Rode with Mathieu Trésarrieu, Theo di Palma, Dimitri Bergé)
- 2014 (Finland) Forssa (Third) 18/41pts (Rode with Mathieu Trésarrieu, Theo di Palma)
- 2015 (Germany) Mühldorf (4th) 14/40pts (Rode with Mathieu Trésarrieu, Theo di Palma, Dimitri Berge)
- 2016 Did not compete
- 2017 (Netherlands) Roden (Second) 15/54pts (Rode with Mathieu Trésarrieu, Dimitri Bergé, Gaetan Stella)
- 2018 (France) Morizès (Champion) 1/54pts (rode with Mathieu Trésarrieu, David Bellego, Dimitri Bergé)

== European Grasstrack Championship ==
- 1993 (Netherlands) Eenrum (NSR)
- 1994 (Germany) Cloppenburg (5th) 16pts
- 1995 (Netherlands) Joure (15th) 3pts
- 1996 (France) Saint-Colomb-de-Lauzun (11th) 7pts
- 1997 No Competition
- 1998 Did not compete
- 1999 Semi-finalist
- 2000 (France) Saint-Colomb-de-Lauzun (11th) 8pts
- 2001 (Netherlands) Noordwolde (6th) 13pts
- 2002 (Germany) Berghaupten (9th) 12pts
- 2003 (France) La Réole (4th) 14pts
- 2004 (Netherlands) Eenrum (17th) 4pts
- 2005 Semi-finalist
- 2006 Semi-finalist
- 2007 Semi-finalist
- 2008 (Netherlands) Siddeburen (CHAMPION) 12pts
- 2009 (Germany) Berghaupten (Second) 16pts
- 2010 Semi-finalist
- 2011 (United Kingdom) Thorpe St Peter (14th) 4pts
- 2012 (Netherlands) Eenrum (8th) 15pts
- 2013 (Germany) Bielefeld (11th) 9pts
- 2014 Semi-finalist
- 2015 Semi-finalist
- 2016 Semi-finalist
- 2017 Semi-finalist
- 2018 (France) Tayac (9th) 10pts

== Family ==
Trésarrieu has two brothers who also compete in motorcycle racing, they are Mathieu Trésarrieu and Sebastien Trésarrieu.
