= Anders Mellgren =

Swedish speedway rider

- Born: 22 June 1991 (age 35); Hagfors, Sweden
- Nationality: Swedish

Career history

Sweden
- 2014: Vargarna
- 2015: Indianerna
- 2016: Munkebo

Great Britain
- 2010–2011: Newport Wasps
- 2011: Somerset Rebels
- 2012–2015: Rye House Rockets
- 2015–2016: Berwick Bandits

Individual honours
- 2012: Swedish U21 silver

Team honours
- 2011: Knockout Cup

Anders Mellgren (born 22 June 1991) is a former motorcycle speedway rider from Sweden.

== Career ==
Mellgren started racing in the British leagues during the 2010 Premier League speedway season, when riding for the Newport Wasps. With Newport, he won the 2011 Premier League Knock-Out Cup during the 2011 season.

Mellgren won the silver medal at the 2012 Swedish Junior Speedway Championship.

In 2012, Mellgren joined the Rye House Rockets and spent four seasons with them before signing for Berwick Bandits mid-way through the 2015 season.

Mellgren reached the final of both the 2017 Team Long Track World Championship and the 2018 Team Long Track World Championship.
