= Dimitri Bergé =

French speedway rider

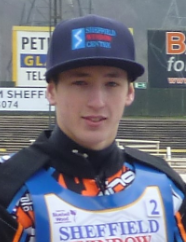
- Born: 5 February 1996 (age 30); Marmande, France
- Nationality: French

Career history

Great Britain
- 2014–2015: Glasgow
- 2015, 2018: Redcar
- 2016: Sheffield
- 2017: Berwick
- 2018–2019: Belle Vue

Poland
- 2022–2023: Landshut
- 2024–2025: Krosno

Sweden
- 2020–2021: Masarna
- 2022: Lejonen
- 2023–2024: Rospiggarna
- 2025: Indianerna

Denmark
- 2021: Fjelsted
- 2025: Region Varde

Individual honours
- 2019: World Longtrack Champion
- 2023: French national Champion
- 2018: European Grasstrack Champion
- 2025: Golden Helmet of Pardubice

Team honours
- 2018, 2019: World Longtrack Team champion

Dimitri Bergé (born 5 February 1996) is a French motorcycle speedway rider.

== Career ==
Bergés' major honours include the 2009 125cc Grasstrack and the World 250cc Longtrack Champion 2012. He was a World Under-21 finalist in 2016 and 2017 and represented France in the 2018 Speedway of Nations.

As well as Speedway, Bergé is an accomplished Long Track rider and won a bronze medal in the 2015 Individual Long Track World Championship. He won the first round in Herxheim, Germany and finished runner-up overall in the 2018 Individual Long Track World Championship. He was also a member of the France team who won the Team Long Track World Championship for the first time in front of their ecstatic fans in Morizès on 1 September 2018 scoring 22 of France's 54 points winning total. Dimitri has also represented his native France in the Speedway of Nations.

In the British leagues, Bergé first rode for Glasgow Tigers and then Redcar Bears before joining Sheffield Tigers in 2016. He rode for the Redcar Bears, having re-joined them in 2018. He signed for Belle Vue Aces for the 2018 and 2019 seasons.

In 2019, Bergé was part of the French team, along with Mathieu Trésarrieu and David Bellego, that won the 2019 Team Long Track World Championship.

In 2023, Bergé was part of the French team that competed at the 2023 Speedway World Cup in Poland and he also won his first French Individual Speedway Championship. The following season in 2024, he signed for Krosno in Poland and Rospiggarna in Sweden.

In 2025, Bergé won the Golden Helmet of Pardubice.

== Family ==
Bergé's father Philippe was also an international speedway rider.

== Major results ==
=== Individual Long Track World Championship ===
Year	GP	Points	Pos	GP Wins	GP Podiums
2013	1	22	11		
2014	DNC				
2015	4	64	3rd		2
2016	5	81	5	2	
2017	DNC				
2018	5	108	2nd	1	3
2019	5	121	1st	1	4

=== Best Grand-Prix results ===
- (Netherlands) Eenrum First 2016, 2018.
- (France) Morizès First 2016, 2019, Third 2015.
- (France) Marmande First 2021.
- (France) La Réole Second 2019, Third 2018.
- (Germany) Herxheim bei Landau/Pfalz Second 2015, 2018, Third 2019, .
- (Germany) Mühldorf Second 2018, 2019.

== Team Long Track World Championship ==
- 2018 (France) Morizès (Champion) 54pts (rode with Mathieu Trésarrieu, David Bellego, Stéphane Trésarrieu)
- 2019 (France) Vechta (Champion) 64pts (rode with Mathieu Trésarrieu, David Bellego, Stéphane Trésarrieu)

== European Grasstrack Championship ==
- 2018 (France) Tayac (Champion) 19pts

== Speedway of Nations ==
Year	Riders	Round	Points	Pos
2018	Rode with David Bellego	RO	14	5th
2019	Rode with David Bellego & Gaétan Stella	RO	16	4th
