= Richard Hall (speedway rider) =

English motorcycle speedway rider (born 1984)

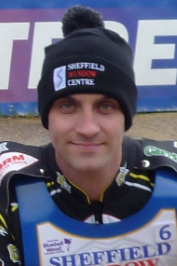
- Born: 23 August 1984 (age 42); Northallerton, England
- Nationality: British (English)

Career history

Great Britain
- 2001-2002: Newcastle Diamonds
- 2003–2005, 2009–2010 2012–2013, 2016: Sheffield Tigers
- 2006–2007, 2014, 2016: Peterborough Panthers
- 2008, 2011: Scunthorpe Scorpions
- 2011: Leicester Lions
- 2014, 2017: Redcar Bears
- 2015: Berwick Bandits
- 2017: Cradley Heathens

Sweden
- 2007: Västervik

Poland
- 2008–2009: Lublin

Team honours
- 2001: Premier League Champion
- 2006: Elite League Champion
- 2015: World Longtrack Team Champion

Richard James Hall (born 23 August 1984) is an English former motorcycle speedway rider.

== Career ==
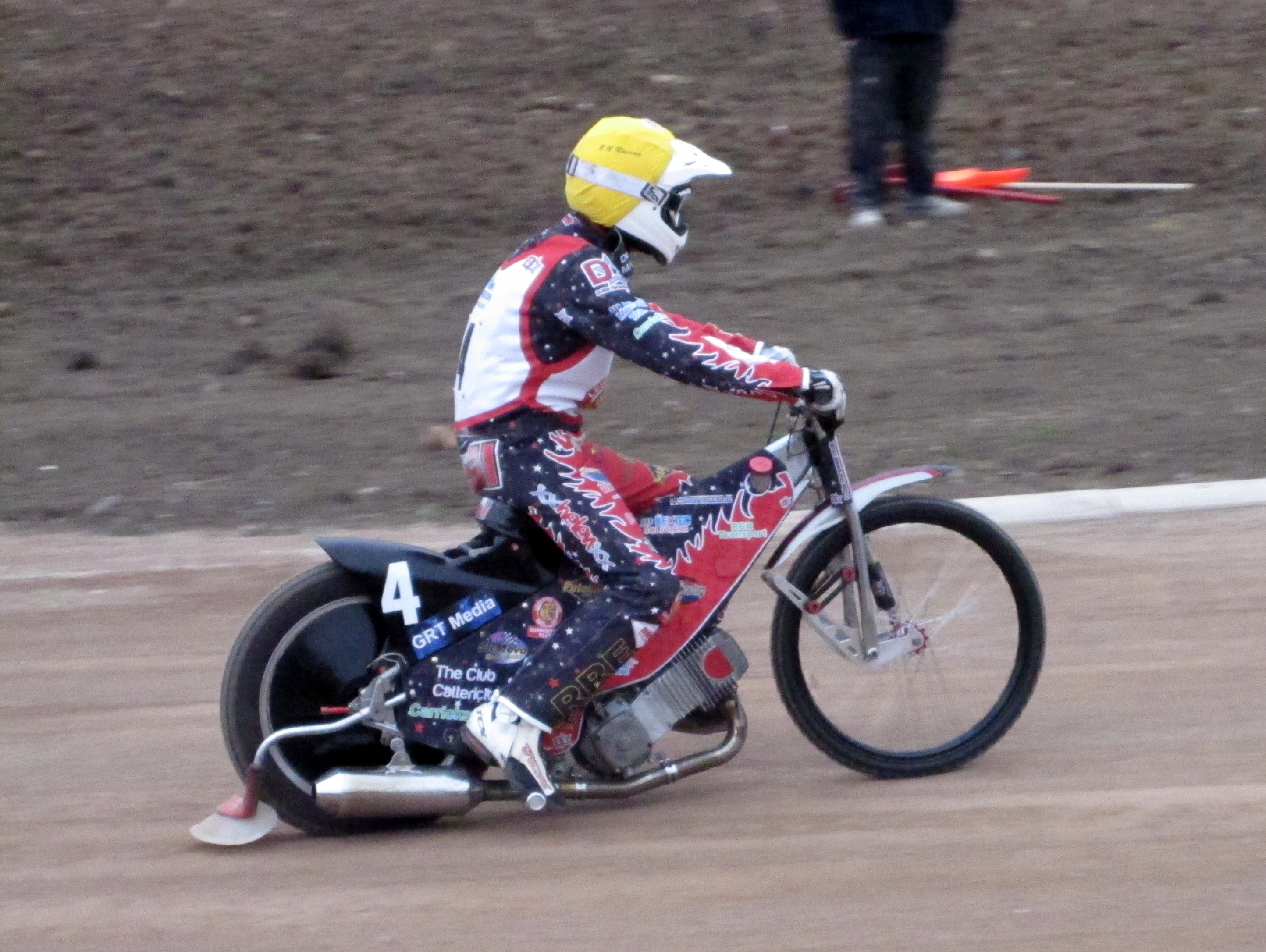
Hall riding at Leicester in 2011

Born in Northallerton, North Yorkshire, Hall began his career with the Newcastle Diamonds, making his debut in the Premier League in 2001, before making his Conference League debut in 2002. Hall rode in the Premier League for Newcastle in 2002, recording an average of 1.52, but managed an average of 7.49 in the Conference League with the Newcastle Gems. Hall spent 2003 without a Premier League ride but he was ever present for Sheffield Tigers in the Conference League, averaging 8.46 a meeting. He also rode five matches for the Boston Barracudas in the Conference Trophy, and eight matches for the Coventry Bees in the British League Cup.

His good form saw him earn a place in the Sheffield Tigers team for 2004, where he averaged 5.55 from 47 meetings. He averaged over five once again in 2005 but in a surprise move he was signed by the Peterborough Panthers for 2006 to ride in the Elite League. In 2006, Hall recorded a 4.54 average and the Panthers won the Elite League Championship with Hall playing a vital role in the second leg of the play-off final. He returned to the Panthers in 2007 but his season was cut short after receiving a fractured pelvis and broken ankle in the Garry Stead Benefit Meeting at Sheffield, a few days after being dropped by the Panthers.

Hall moved from the Elite League team Peterborough Panthers at the end of the 2007 season to captain the Scunthorpe Scorpions in their first season in the Premier League in 2008. In 2008, Hall rode for the Scunthorpe Scorpions in the Premier League. He signed for Sheffield for the 2009 season. In 2011, he joined Leicester Lions as team captain, although he was released mid-season, rejoining Scunthorpe Scorpions. In 2012, he signed for the Sheffield Tigers. In 2014, Hall started the season with Redcar but received a 30-day ban for kicking Scunthorpe's Josh Auty, and was replaced by Poland's Rafal Konopka. Hall sat out of British speedway until a brief, unsuccessful spell with the Peterborough Panthers later that year.

In 2015, Hall signed for Berwick Bandits before riding as part of the British team with Andrew Appleton, Glen Phillips and James Shanes that won the world championship gold medal at the 2015 Team Long Track World Championship. It was the first time that Britain had won the event.

== World Longtrack Championship ==
Grand-Prix Years

- 2004 - 3pts, 25th Overall (1 gp app)
- 2009 - 39pts, 12th Overall (5 gp app)
- 2011 - 50pts, 14th Overall (6 gp app)
- 2013 - 96pts, 3rd Overall (6 gp app)
- 2014 - 65pts, 4th Overall (4 gp app)
- 2015 - 44pts, 8th Overall (4 gp app)
- 2016 - 61pts, 6th Overall (5gp app)

Best Grand-Prix Results First

- (France) Marmande 2013 (1st)
- (France) Morizès 2014 (1st)
- (Germany) Vechta 2015 (2nd)

Challenge Best

- 2008 (Netherlands) Aduard (3rd)
- 2010 (Finland) Forssa (3rd)

== World Longtrack Team Championship ==
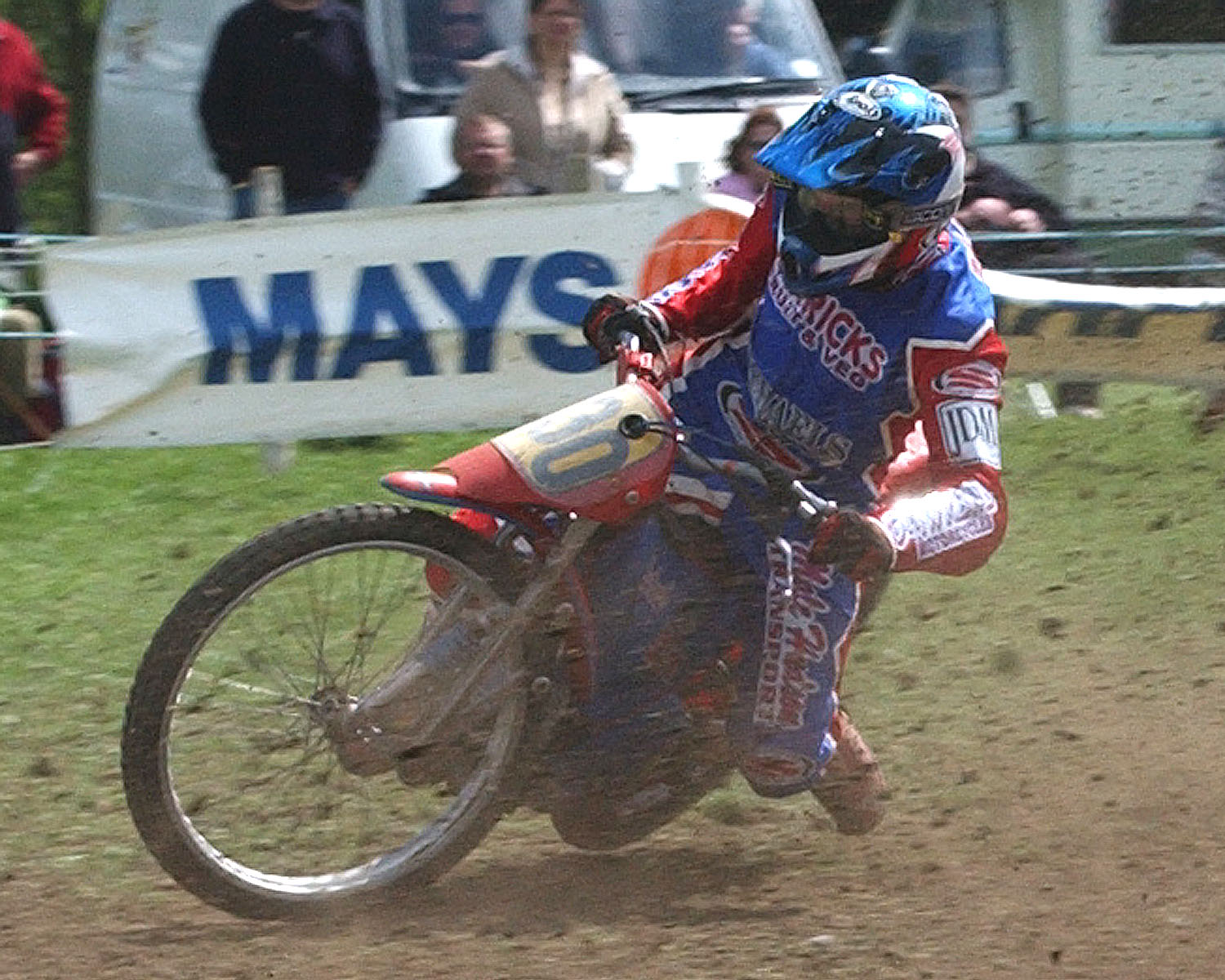
Hall competing in grasstrack during 2003

- 2008 - (Germany) Werlte (with Glen Phillips, Mitchel Godden & Vincent Kinchin) bronze medal
- 2009 - (Netherlands) Eenrum (with Paul Hurry, Glen Phillips & Andrew Appleton) Fourth
- 2010 - (France) Morizès (with Glen Phillips, Andrew Appleton & Chris Mills) Fourth
- 2013 - (England) Folkestone (with Andrew Appleton, Glen Phillips & Paul Cooper) Third
- 2014 - (Finland) Forssa (with Glen Phillips, Andrew Appleton & David Howe) Fifth
- 2015 - (Germany) Mühldorf (with Glen Phillips, Andrew Appleton & James Shanes) Champions
- 2016 - (Czech Republic) Mariánské Lázně (with Glen Phillips, Andrew Appleton & James Shanes) 4th
- 2017 - (Netherlands) Roden (with Edward Kennett, Andrew Appleton & James Shanes) 6th

== European Grasstrack Championship ==
- 2009 (Germany) Berghaupten 5th (12pts)
- 2011 (England) Skegness 9th (15pts)
- 2012 (Netherlands) Eenrum 10th (12pts)

== Other Honours ==
- British Junior Sand Racing Champion,
- British Intermediate Sand Racing Champion – 2 times holder
- ACU National Grasstrack Challenge Champion
