= Gaétan Stella =

French motorcycle speedway rider

- Born: 10 April 1999 (age 27); Marmande, France
- Nationality: French

Individual honours
- 2017: French national Champion

Gaétan Stella (born 10 April 1999) is a motorcycle speedway rider from France. He is a member of the France national long track team.

== Career ==
Stella won the world long track 250cc title in 2016. However, Stella came to prominence in 2017, after becoming the French national Champion. Stella was called up for France in the 2018 Speedway of Nations.

Stella has represented both the France national speedway team and the Long track national team, and competed in the 2019 Speedway of Nations.

Stella finished 14th during the 2023 Individual Long Track World Championship.

== Major results ==
=== Individual Long Track World Championship ===
| Year | Pos | Points |
|---|---|---|
| 2019 | 19th | 1 |
| 2020 | 17th | 2 |
| 2021 | 14th | 9 |
| 2023 | 14th | 24 |

=== Speedway of Nations ===
| Year | Pos | Points |
|---|---|---|
| 2019 | =8th | 16 |

=== World Team Longtrack ===
| Year | Pos | Points |
|---|---|---|
| 2023 | 7th | 29 |
