= Andrew Appleton =

British motorcycle racer

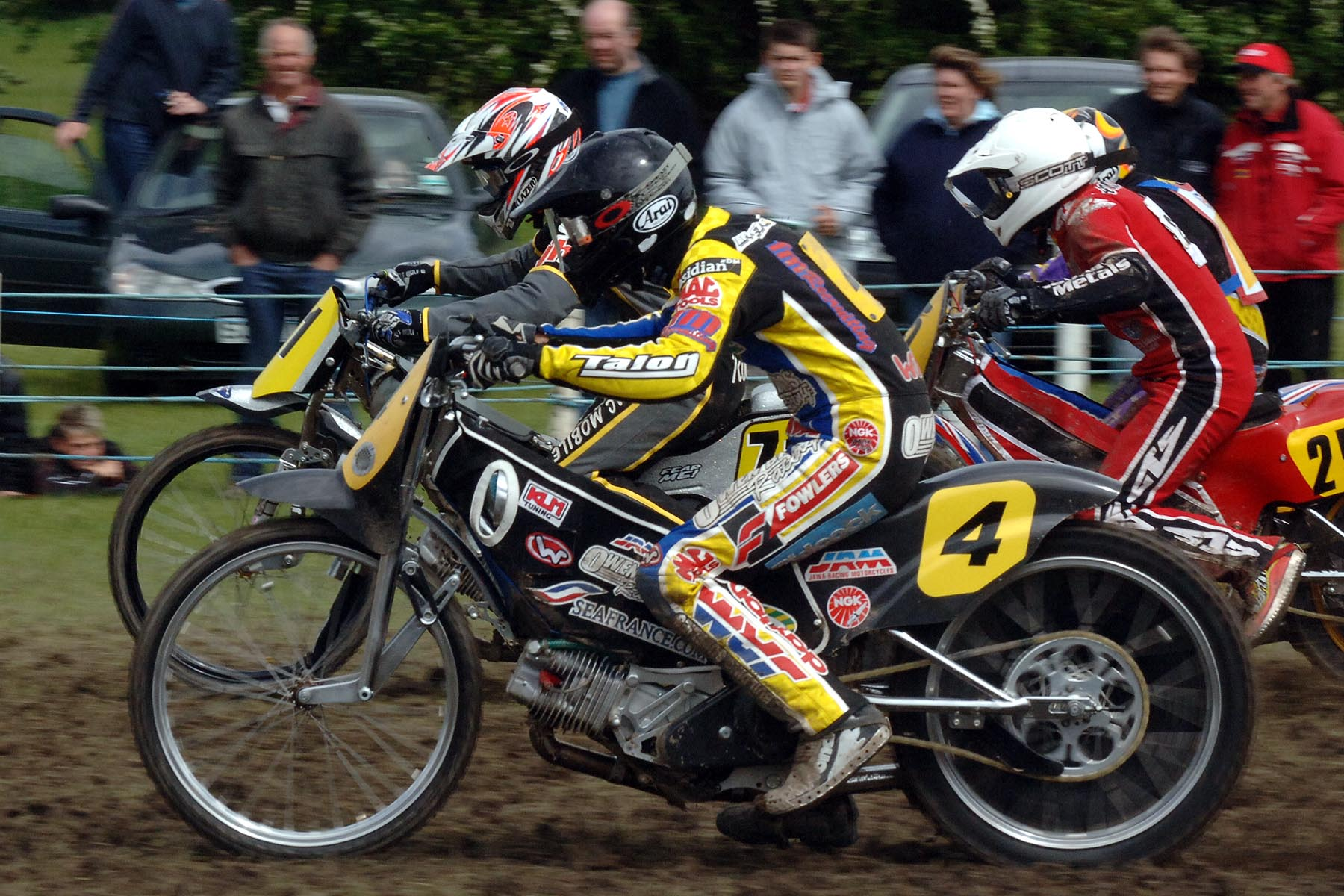
- Appleton in 2007
- Born: 18 June 1982 (age 44); Reading, England
- Nationality: British (English)

Career history

Great Britain
- 1998–2000: Newport Wasps
- 1998: Arena Essex Hammers
- 1998: Edinburgh Monarchs
- 2000: Wolverhampton Wolves
- 2000: Eastbourne Eagles
- 2000–2002: Oxford Cheetahs
- 2000–2005: Reading Bulldogs
- 2002: Coventry Bees
- 2003: Poole Pirates
- 2004: Peterborough Panthers

Sweden
- 2001: Getingarna
- 2003: Lejonen

Individual honours
- 2002: New Zealand Speedway Champion
- 2010: European Grasstrack Champion
- 2006, 2010, 2011, 2014: British Masters Grasstrack Champion

Team honours
- 2015, 2025: World Longtrack Team champion
- 2023: World Longtrack Team bronze

Andrew Appleton (born 18 June 1982) is an English motorcycle racer.

== Career ==
Appleton competes in grasstrack, longtrack and speedway.

Appleton's first full season in the British leagues was when he rode for Newport Wasps during the 1999 Premier League speedway season. The Welsh team enjoyed a good season finishing runner-up to Sheffield Tigers.

Appleton was part of the Oxford Cheetahs title winning team during the 2001 Elite League speedway season.

Appleton's biggest solo honour on grasstrack was his gold medal success in the European Grasstrack Championship in 2010 and the winning Grand Prix in Eenrum the same year, along with four British Masters championship titles (2007, 2010, 2011, 2014).

In 2015, Appleton was part of the British team with Richard Hall, Glen Phillips and James Shanes that won the world championship gold medal at the 2015 Team Long Track World Championship. It was the first time that Britain had won the event.

In 2023, Appleton was part of the British longtrack team, along with Chris Harris and Zach Wajtknecht, that won the bronze medal at the 2023 Team Long Track World Championship.

In 2025, Appleton was a member of the Great Britain team that won the longtrack world championships (2025 FIM Long Track of Nations).

== Major results ==
=== Longtrack ===
World Individual Championship

- 2003 4 app (18th) 18pts
- 2004 5 app (6th) 59pts
- 2005 4 app (10th) 34pts
- 2006 2 app (16th) 12pts
- 2007 3 app (5th) 41pts
- 2008 4 app (4th) 62pts
- 2009 4 app (14th) 37pts
- 2010 4 app (6th) 102pts
- 2011 6 app (15th) 48pts
- 2012 4 app (12th) 53pts
- 2014 4 app (13th) 28pts
- 2015 4 app (15th) 21pts
- 2016 4 app (13th) 28pts

Best Grand-Prix results

- (Netherlands) Eenrum First 2010
- (Finland) Forssa Second 2011
- (Czech Republic) Mariánské Lázně Second 2010
- (France) Morizès Third 2008
- (Germany) Vechta Second 2008

World Team Championship

- 2007 - (France) Morizès (with Paul Hurry, Glen Phillips & Mitch Godden) Second
- 2009 - (Netherlands) Eenrum (with Paul Hurry, Glen Phillips & Richard Hall) Fourth
- 2010 - (France) Morizès (with Glen Phillips, Richard Hall & Chris Mills) Fourth
- 2011 - (Germany) Scheeßel (with Paul Cooper, Glen Phillips & Mitch Godden) Third
- 2013 - (England) Folkestone (with Richard Hall, Glen Phillips & Paul Cooper) Third
- 2014 - (Finland) Forssa (with Glen Phillips, Richard Hall & David Howe) Fifth
- 2015 - (Germany) Muhldorf (with Glen Phillips, Richard Hall & James Shanes) champions
- 2016 - (Czech Republic) Mariánské Lázně (with Glen Phillips, Richard Hall & James Shanes) 4th
- 2017 - (Netherlands) Roden (with Edward Kennett, Richard Hall & James Shanes) 6th
- 2023 - (Netherlands) Roden (with Chris Harris, Zach Wajtknecht) 3rd
- 2024 - (France) Morizès (with Chris Harris, Zach Wajtknecht, Edward Kennett) 3rd
- 2025 - (Germany) Vechta (with Chris Harris, Zach Wajtknecht) champions

=== Grasstrack ===
European Championship

- 2003 (France) La Réole (13th) 7pts
- 2004 (Netherlands) Eenrum (6th) 12pts
- 2005 (Germany) Schwarme (Third) 12pts
- 2006 (France) La Réole (6th) 18pts
- 2007 (England) Folkestone (Third) 20pts
- 2008 Semi-final
- 2009 (Germany) Berghaupten (16th) 6pts
- 2010 (France) La Réole (Champion) 18pts
- 2011 (England) Skegness (Third) 15pts
- 2012 Semi-final
- 2013 Semi-final
- 2014 (France) Saint-Macaire (8th) 12pts
- 2015 (Netherlands) Staphorst (6th) 12pts
- 2016 (England) Folkestone (Third) 15pts
- 2017 (Germany) Hertingen (Second) 16pts
- 2023 (Germany) Werlte (third) 15pts

British Masters

Podium Finishes

- 2002 (England) Skegness Third
- 2004 (England) Skegness Second
- 2006 (England) Wadebridge Champion
- 2009 (England) Blackwater Third
- 2010 (England) Folkestone Champion
- 2011 (England) Folkestone Champion
- 2013 (England) Wimborne Second
- 2014 (England) Folkestone Champion
- 2015 (England) Wimborne Second
- 2018 (England) Cheshire Third
