= Mika Meijer =

Dutch speedway rider

- Born: 5 April 2001 (age 25); Winschoten, Netherlands
- Nationality: Dutch

Career history

Sweden
- 2022: Smålänningarna
- 2023–2024: Njudungarna
- 2025: Griparna

Denmark
- 2022: Vojens

Team honours
- 2023: World Longtrack Team Champion
- 2025: World Longtrack Team silver

Mika Meijer (born 5 April 2001) is a motorcycle speedway and long track rider from the Netherlands.

== Career ==
Meijer came to prominence when he reached the U19 final of the 2017 Individual Speedway Junior European Championship. In 2020, he competed for the 'Young Europe' team during the 2020 Team Speedway Junior European Championship final.

Meijer has concentrated on Long track racing in recent years and finished 11th in the 2022 Individual Long Track World Championship and competed in the 2023 Individual Long Track World Championship.

Meijer's clubs have included MSC Schwarme in Germany, Smålänningarna in Sweden and in Vojens Speedway Klub in Denmark. He won the Dutch speedway title in 2023, and also in 2023, was part of the Dutch team, along with Romano Hummel, Dave Meijerink and Jannick de Jong, that won the 2023 Team Long Track World Championship.

In 2025, Meijer was a member of the Netherlands team that won silver at the longtrack world championships (2025 FIM Long Track of Nations).
