= Tayac, Gironde =

Tayac
- Commune
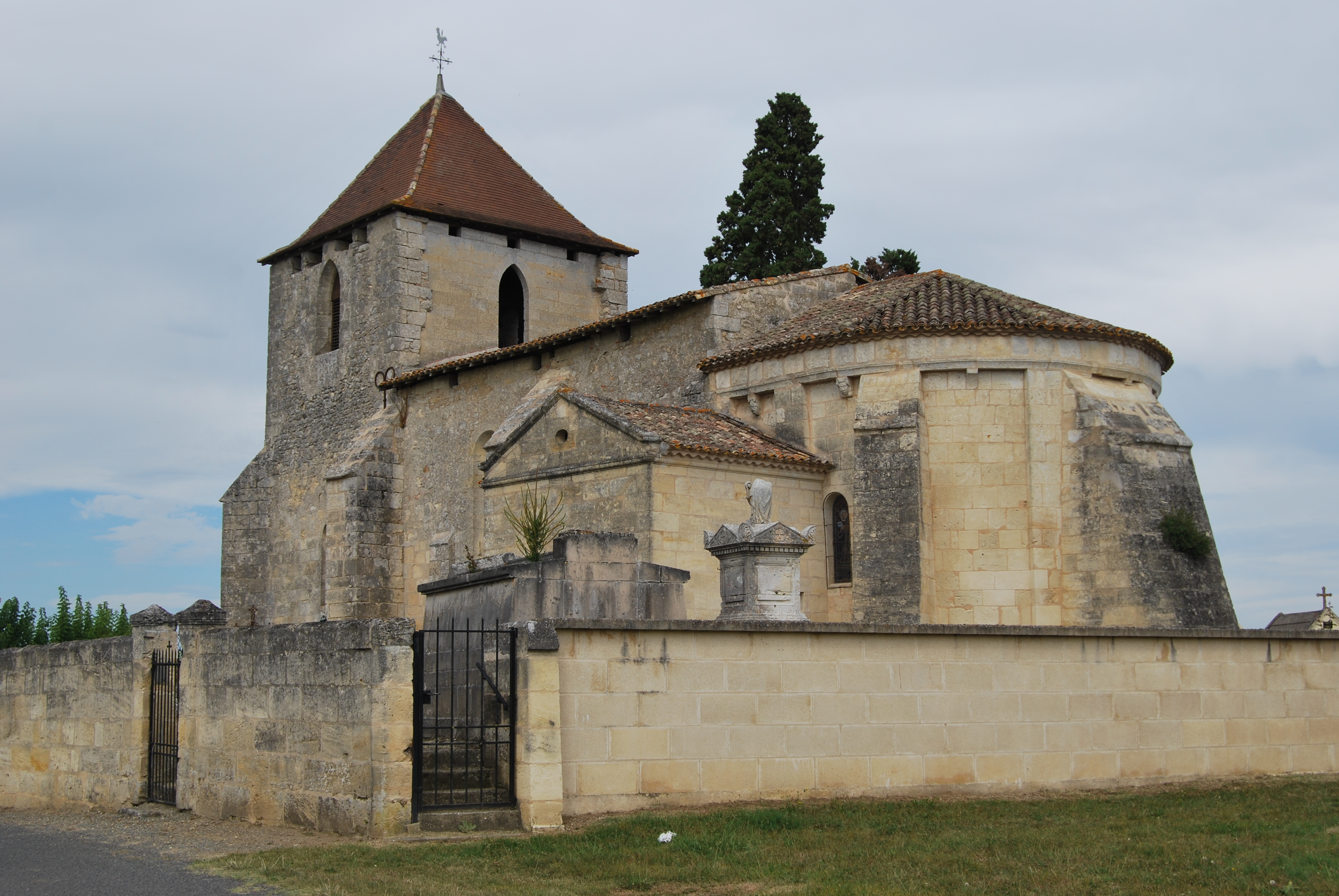
- The church in Tayac
- Location of Tayac
- Location within France Location within Nouvelle-Aquitaine
- Coordinates: 44°57′12″N 0°00′32″W
- Country: France
- Region: Nouvelle-Aquitaine
- Department: Gironde
- Arrondissement: Libourne
- Canton: Le Nord-Libournais

Government
  - Mayor (2020–2026): Éric Barret
- Area^{1}: 7.22 km^{2} (2.79 sq mi)
- Elevation: 90 m (300 ft)
- Highest elevation: 87 m (285 ft)
- Lowest elevation: 37 m (121 ft)
- Population (2023): 126
  - Density: 17.5/km^{2} (45.2/sq mi)
- Time zone: UTC+01:00 (CET)
  - Summer (DST): UTC+02:00 (CEST)
- INSEE/Postal code: 33526 /33570
- ^{1} French Land Register data, which excludes lakes, ponds, glaciers > 1 km^{2} (0.386 sq mi or 247 acres) and river estuaries.

Tayac (French pronunciation: [tajak]; Occitan: Taiac) is a commune in the Gironde department in Nouvelle-Aquitaine in southwestern France.

== Population ==
Historical population
| Year | Pop. | ±% p.a. |
|---|---|---|
| 1968 | 141 | — |
| 1975 | 141 | +0.00% |
| 1982 | 140 | −0.10% |
| 1990 | 133 | −0.64% |
| 1999 | 131 | −0.17% |
| 2007 | 160 | +2.53% |
| 2012 | 134 | −3.48% |
| 2017 | 133 | −0.15% |
| 2023 | 126 | −0.90% |
Source: INSEE

== See also ==
- Communes of the Gironde department

== Sport ==
Tayac is famous for Motorcycle racing. It has held both International Grasstrack and Longtrack meetings. In 2017 it hosted the European Grasstrack Sidecar Final and in 2018 the European Grasstrack Solos Final.
