= Romano Hummel =

Dutch speedway rider (1999–2026)

- Born: 4 January 1999
- Died: 21 October 2026 (aged 27); Hoogkerk, Groningen, The Netherlands

Career history
- 2016: Berwick Bandits

Individual honours
- 2021: Long Track World Champion

Team honours
- 2023: World Longtrack Team champion
- 2025: World Longtrack Team silver
- 2017: World Longtrack Team bronze

Romano Hummel (4 January 1999 – 21 October 2026) was a Dutch international long track & speedway rider.

== Speedway career ==
Hummel became the Long Track World Champion, after winning the 2021 Individual Long Track World Championship. He had previously won a bronze medal at the 2017 Team Long Track World Championship.

He rode in the 2016 Premier League speedway season of British Speedway in 2016, riding for the Berwick Bandits.

In 2023, Hummel was part of the Dutch team, along with Dave Meijerink, Mika Meijer and Jannick de Jong, that won the 2023 Team Long Track World Championship.

After twice winning the European Grasstrack Championship in 2022 and 2023, Hummel lost out to Chris Harris in 2024.

In 2025, Hummel was a member of the Netherlands team that won silver at the longtrack world championships (2025 FIM Long Track of Nations).

== Death ==
Hummel died by suicide on 21 October 2026 in his hometown of Hoogkerk, at the age of 27.
