= Zach Wajtknecht =

British speedway rider (born 1998)

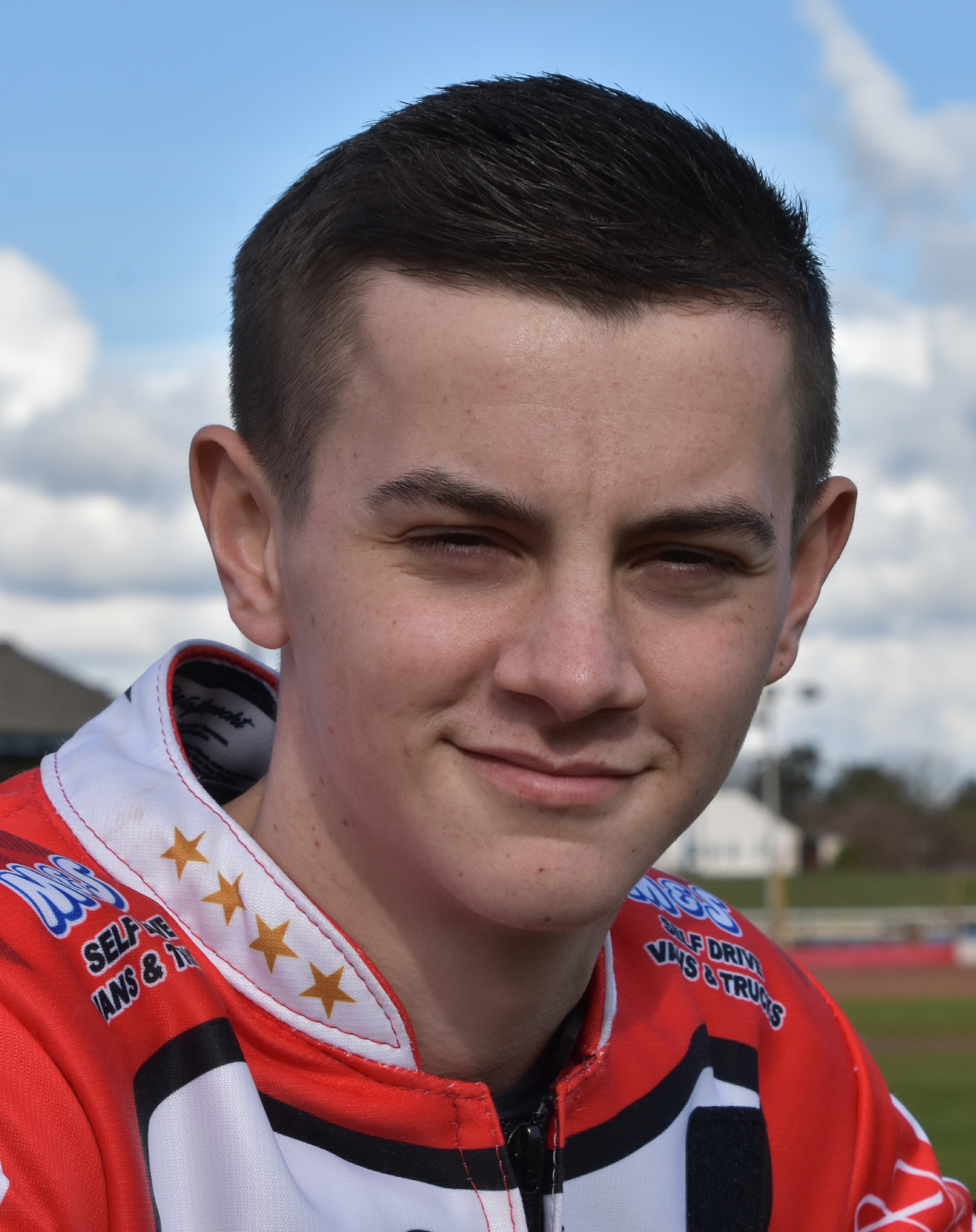
- Born: 8 February 1998 (age 28); Saltford, Bristol, England
- Nationality: British (English)

Career history
- 2015–2016: Birmingham Brummies
- 2016: Somerset Rebels
- 2017: Lakeside Hammers
- 2017: Swindon Robins
- 2018: Lakeside Hammers
- 2019: Birmingham Brummies

Individual honours
- 2025: World longtrack champion
- 2022: World longtrack silver medal
- 2024: World longtrack bronze medal
- 2017: British Under-19 Champion
- 2019: European Grasstrack Champion
- 2018: British Grasstrack Champion

Team honours
- 2025: World Longtrack Team champion
- 2018: World Longtrack Team silver
- 2023, 2024: World Longtrack Team bronze
- 2015: National League
- 2015: National League Fours
- 2017: SGB Premiership

Zach Wajtknecht (born 8 February 1998) is a motorcycle speedway rider from Great Britain. In 2025, he became the World longtrack champion.

== Career ==
At an early age, Wajtknecht became a double World Champion, twice triumphing in the FIM 125cc Grasstrack Youth Gold Trophy. He followed up these successes by being crowned British 250cc Youth Champion in 2013 and winner of the FIM 250cc Longtrack Youth World Cup in 2014. These successes led to him being awarded the prestigious Pinhard trophy, a trophy he described himself as being "over the moon" to win.

Wajtknecht was handed his big break in speedway by the newly reformed National League Birmingham Brummies ahead of the 2015 season, the team's first season in the third tier of British Speedway. The team was put together by former manager Phil Morris, the newly appointed FIM Race Director for the Speedway Grand Prix series. Morris described Wajtknecht as having "what it takes to enjoy a very successful speedway career" He was part of the Birmingham team that won the league title during the 2015 National League speedway season and the National League Fours, held on 14 June 2015 at Brandon Stadium.

In 2017, Wajtknecht won the British Under-19 Championship at Plymouth and rode for Swindon. His 2017 season was cut short in July when a crash at Swindon resulted in a ruptured spleen and punctured lung.

In 2019, Wajtknecht was the European Grasstrack champion. This was the same season that he decided to concentrate longtrack and grasstrack and stop riding conventional speedway.

In 2022, Wajtknecht finished second for the World Longtrack title, finishing 28 points behind Mathieu Trésarrieu in the 2022 Individual Long Track World Championship. In 2023, he was part of the British longtrack team, along with Chris Harris and Andrew Appleton, that won the bronze medal at the 2023 Team Long Track World Championship. At the 2024 FIM Long Track World Championship Wajtknecht secured the bronze medal after the five rounds.

In 2025, Wajtknecht was a member of the Great Britain team that won the longtrack world championships (2025 FIM Long Track of Nations) and shortly afterwards won the 2025 world individual longtrack championship.

== Major results ==
=== World Longtrack Championship Grand-Prix ===
- 2019 - 2 apps (14th) 25pts
- 2020 - 2 apps (4th) 32pts
- 2021 - 2 apps (15th) 8pts
- 2022 - 6 apps (2nd) 88pts
- 2023 - 6 apps (4th) 77pts
- 2024 - 5 apps (3rd) 86pts
- 2025 - 4 apps (champion) pts

=== World Longtrack Team Championship ===
- 2018 - (France) Morizes 6/46pts (with James Shanes, Adam Ellis & Chris Harris) 2nd
- 2019 - (Germany) Vechta 16/41pts (with Chris Harris, Edward Kennett & Adam Ellis) 4th
- 2022 - (Germany) Herxheim 29/38pts (with Chris Harris, James Shanes) 5th
- 2023 - (Netherlands) Roden 12/49pts (with Chris Harris, Andrew Appleton) 3rd
- 2024 - (France) Morizès 14/46pts (with Chris Harris, Andrew Appleton, Edward Kennett) 3rd
- 2025 - (Germany) Vechta 26/56pts (with Chris Harris, Andrew Appleton) champions

=== European Grasstrack Championship ===
Year	Venue	Points	Pos
2018	(France) Tayac	16	3rd
2019	(Germany) Bad Hersfeld	18	Champion
