= Dave Meijerink =

Dutch speedway rider

- Born: 23 March 2000 (age 26); Schuinesloot, Netherlands
- Nationality: Dutch

Team honours
- 2023: World Longtrack Team Champion
- 2025: World Longtrack Team silver

Dave Meijerink (born 23 March 2000) is a long track rider, grasstrack racer and motorcycle speedway from the Netherlands.

== Career ==
Meijerink was beginning to impress in the Netherlands during 2017 but came to prominence when he reached the finals of both the 2018 Team Long Track World Championship and the 2018 Individual Long Track World Championship. He finished just outside the medal placings in the former, finishing in fourth place. He repeated the fourth-place finish in the 2022 Team Long Track World Championship.

Meijerink has concentrated solely on Long track racing and grasstrack racing in recent years and finished 16th in the 2022 Individual Long Track World Championship and competed in the 2023 Individual Long Track World Championship.

In 2023, Meijerink was part of the Dutch team, along with Romano Hummel, Mika Meijer and Jannick de Jong, that won the 2023 Team Long Track World Championship.

In 2025, Meijerink was a member of the Netherlands team that won silver at the longtrack world championships (2025 FIM Long Track of Nations).
