= Chris Harris (speedway rider) =

British speedway rider

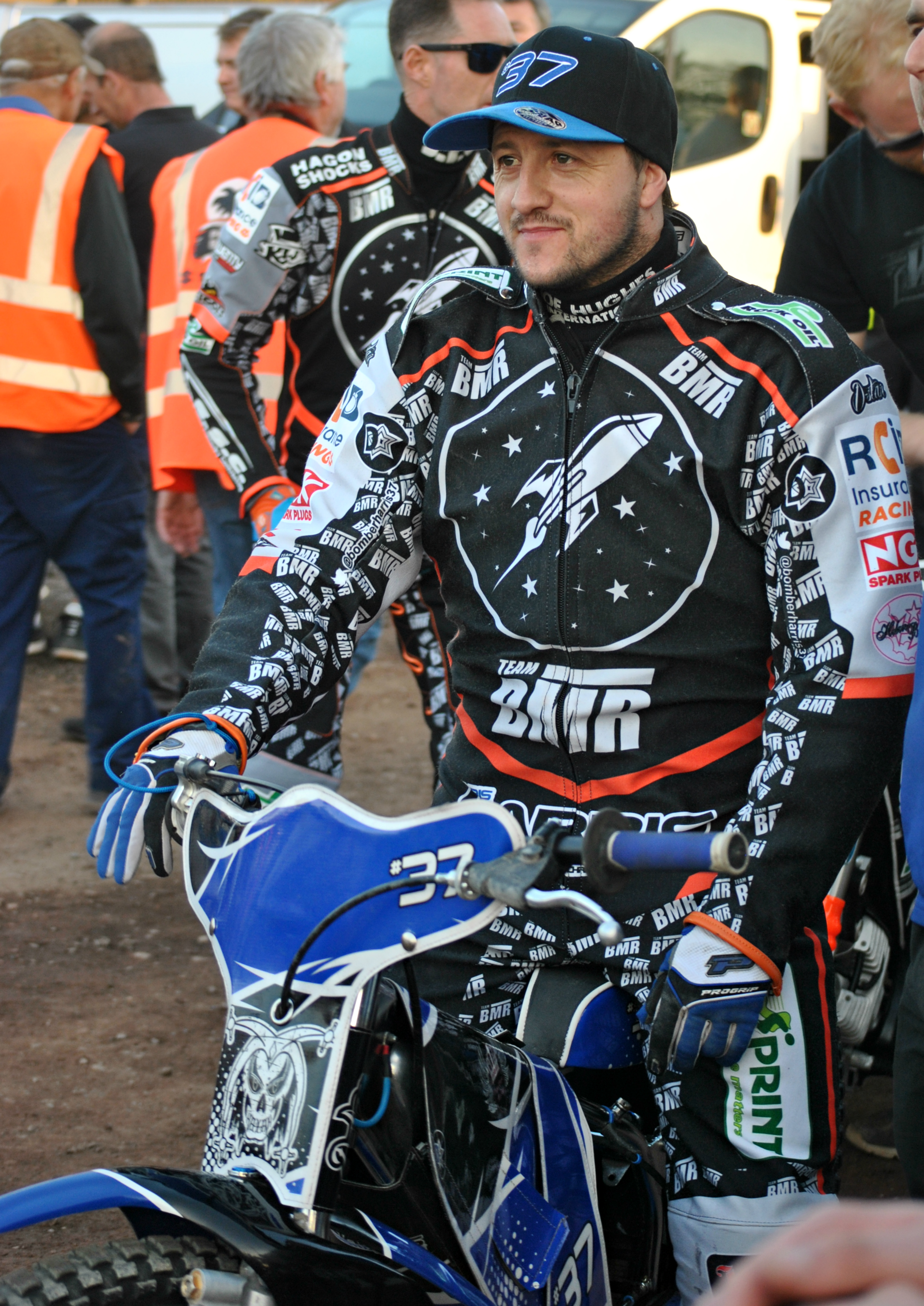
- Harris in 2017
- Born: 28 November 1982 (age 43); Truro, Cornwall, England
- Nickname: Bomber
- Website: www.chrisharrisracing.co.uk

Career history

Great Britain
- 1998: St Austell
- 1999–2000: Exeter
- 2001–2003: Trelawny
- 2003, 2017, 2020–2022, 2023: Peterborough
- 2004–2010, 2012, 2014–2016: Coventry
- 2011: Belle Vue
- 2013, 2020–2021: Birmingham
- 2017–2018: Rye House
- 2018, 2023–2026: Glasgow
- 2018: Poole
- 2019: Ipswich
- 2019: Somerset
- 2022: Berwick
- 2023: Leicester
- 2024: Oxford
- 2025-2026: King's Lynn

Poland
- 2006–2007, 2014–15: Rybnik
- 2008: Ostrów
- 2010–11, 2017: Rzeszów
- 2012: Częstochowa
- 2013: Grudziądz
- 2016: Kraków
- 2022: Poznań

Sweden
- 2004–2005: Kaparna
- 2006–2013: Västervik
- 2014: Rospiggarna
- 2024: Vargarna

Denmark
- 2006–2007: Slangerup
- 2016: Holstebro

Speedway Grand Prix statistics
- SGP number: 37
- Starts: 103
- Finalist: 9 times
- Winner: 1 times

Individual honours
- 2007, 2009, 2010: British champion
- 2007: British Grand Prix Winner
- 2023, 2025: Long Track World Championship silver medal
- 2022: Long Track World Championship bronze medal
- 2025: SGB Championship Riders' champion
- 2024: European Grasstrack champion

Team honours
- 2025: Team Longtrack World champion
- 2018: Team Longtrack World silver
- 2023: World Longtrack Team bronze
- 2005, 2007, 2010, 2018, 2021: Elite League/Premiership Champion
- 2008, 2010: Elite League Pairs Winner
- 2006, 2007: Elite League KO Cup Winner
- 2000, 2023: Premier League/Championship Champion
- 2007, 2008: Craven Shield Winner
- 2023: SGB Championship Pairs
- 2017, 2019: SGB Championship Fours
- 2002: Premier Trophy Winner
- 1998: Conference League Champion
- 1998: Conference League KO Cup

Christopher Calvin Harris (born 28 November 1982) from Truro, Cornwall, nicknamed Bomber, is a Great Britain international motorcycle speedway and grass track rider from England.

== Career history ==
=== Early career ===
Harris began his racing career at the age of six and a half by competing in grasstrack events. His talent quickly became apparent when he began to win all of the junior age groups in the South-West area. In 1998, aged 15, he turned to speedway racing for the St. Austell Gulls at Amateur Conference League level. The Gulls won the Championship and the Knockout Cup.

On his 16th birthday, Harris signed for the Exeter Falcons, who competed in the Premier League, the middle tier of British speedway's three-league structure. Despite the death of his father, who was his driver and mentor, he achieved his first notable individual success later that year, when he became Great Britain Under-16 Champion. He was also selected to ride for Great Britain at both Under-19 and Under-21 level.

In 2000, Harris more than doubled his previous year's points total, being unbeaten by an opponent in several matches. The Exeter Falcons team finished the season as Premier League Champions and reached two cup finals and one semi-final. Harris moved clubs for the 2001 season, joining the Trelawny Tigers in Cornwall. He soon became their top scorer and qualified for the 2001 Individual Speedway Junior World Championship as first reserve. He continued his form into 2002, being made club captain. Once again, he was top scorer for the club and under his captaincy Trelawny Tigers won the Premier Trophy.

=== Elite League progress and international debut ===
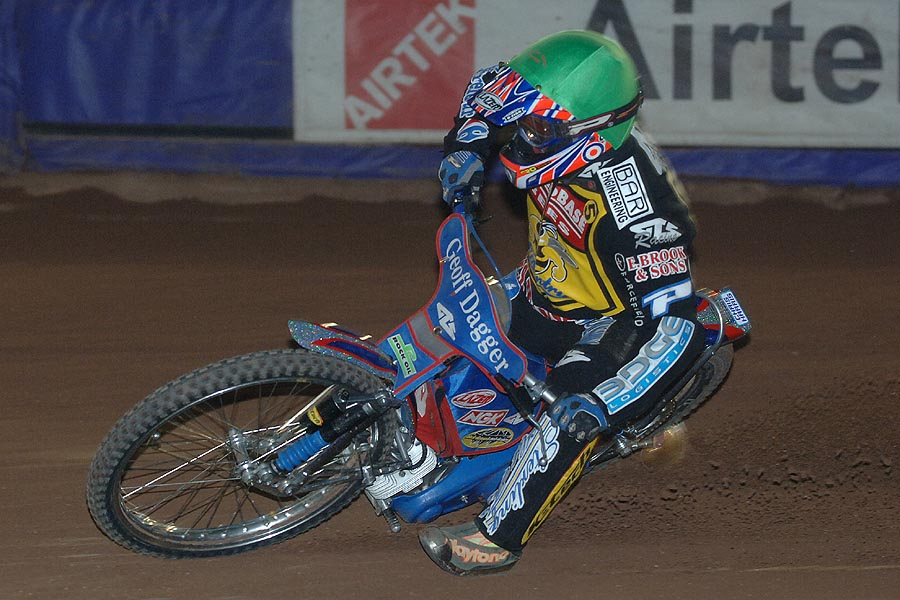
Harris riding for Coventry in 2007

Taking advantage of new rules introduced to assist young British riders, Harris also took the step up to ride in the Elite League in 2002, with the Peterborough Panthers. He progressed well during his debut Elite League season, moving up into the main body of the team. Individually, he progressed to the final of the British Speedway Championship and finished fourth in the World Under-21 Championship.

In 2003, Harris rode again for Trelawny Tigers in the Premier League and Peterborough Panthers in the Elite League. By the end of the season, he was an Elite League heat-leader. Off track, he was voted BBC South-West Sports Personality of the Year.

However, it was on the individual front Harris was most successful. In the World Under-21 Championship, he won both his quarter and semi final rounds, progressing to the 2003 Individual Speedway Junior World Championship in Sweden where he finished runner-up, one point behind Jarosław Hampel.

His form during 2003 won Harris an invitation to take part as a reserve in the third round of the 2003 FIM Individual Speedway World Championship, the British Grand Prix, held at Millennium Stadium in Cardiff.

2004 saw Harris sign for the Coventry Bees. The following season, the Bees won the Elite League Championship, which meant Harris had won titles at all three levels of British speedway aged just 22. He also represented Great Britain in the Speedway World Cup. Harris continued to ride for Coventry until 2011.

=== International success ===
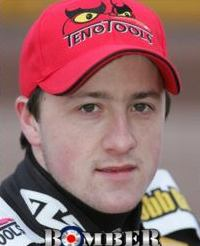
Harris in 2007

In 2007, Harris became British Champion. Harris was selected to ride as a permanent wild card in the 2007 Speedway Grand Prix series, riding at number 15. In only his fifth full Grand Prix meeting he won the British Grand Prix at Cardiff. Winning the Grand Prix was considered to be the biggest event to happen in British Speedway for several years.

Off track, Harris was again voted BBC South-West Sports Personality of the Year. and was also voted BBC Midlands Sports Personality of the Year, beating footballer Gareth Barry into second place.

Harris won the British Championship twice more in 2009 and 2010 and for the first time since 2004, Harris would not ride for Coventry after he moved on loan to Belle Vue Aces for the 2011 Elite League speedway season. He continued to perform well in the 2011 World Championship including a second-place finish in the Croatian Grand Prix. After another season with Coventry in 2012, he would join Birmingham Brummies for the 2013 season. In 2014, he returned to Coventry until the end of the 2016 season.

Despite Harris finishing his Grand Prix appearances, he continued to impress in Britain. He finished his Grand Prix career with a record of 103 meetings, nine finals, one win and 608 points. He also decided to compete in both divisions of the British league for the first time in 2017, riding for Rye House Rockets and Peterborough. He was part of the Peterborough team that won the SGB Championship Fours, which was held on 6 August 2017, at the East of England Arena.

Harris continued to ride in both divisions and made debuts for Glasgow Tigers, Poole Pirates and Ipswich Witches in 2018 and Somerset Rebels and Berwick Bandits in 2019. He won another fours championships, this time as part of the Somerset team that won the Fours, held on 23 June 2019, at the East of England Arena.

In 2022, Harris rode for the Peterborough in the SGB Premiership 2022 and captained Berwick in the SGB Championship 2022. He was named rider of the year for Berwick. He also had a successful longtrack season winning a bronze medal at the 2022 Individual Long Track World Championship.

In 2023, Harris signed for Leicester Lions for the SGB Premiership 2023 and made a return to Glasgow for the SGB Championship 2023, where he won the league title and the Championship pairs. Also in 2023, he also claimed a silver medal in the 2023 Individual Long Track World Championship and a bronze medal at the 2023 Team Long Track World Championship.

Harris signed for the Oxford Spires for the 2024 Premiership season. and re-signed for Glasgow for the 2024 Championship season. Harris won the 2024 European Grasstrack Championship. He previously came second in 2022 and 2023.

Harris signed for King's Lynn Stars for the SGB Premiership 2025 and became the tier 2 Rider's champion for Glasgow.

In 2025, Harris was a member of the Great Britain team that won the longtrack world championships (2025 FIM Long Track of Nations) and shortly afterwards finished runner-up behind Zach Wajtknecht in the world longtrack individual championship.

== Speedway Grand Prix results ==
Year	Position	Points	Best Finish	Notes
2003	46th	1	18th	
2007	9th	91	Winner	Won the British GP (Harris's first GP win).
2008	13th	58	6th	
2009	14th	62	5th	
2010	6th	107	2nd (Three times)	Finished 2nd in the Croatian GP, 2nd in the Italian GP, 2nd in the Polish 2 GP and Finished 3rd in the Danish GP.
2011	11th	74	2nd	Finished 2nd in the Croatian GP.
2012	12th	65	4th	Finished 4th in the Danish GP.
2012	20th	7	10th	Finished 10th in the British GP.
2014	15th	48	11th	Finished 11th in the Czech, British & Polish II GP.
2015	13th	55	2nd	Finished 2nd in the Polish GP.
2016	15th	40	3rd	Finished 3rd in Czech GP

=== SGP Podium ===
1. (Europe) (Poland) Wrocław (12 May 2007) – 3rd place
2. (United Kingdom) Cardiff (30 June 2007) – 1st place
3. (Denmark) Copenhagen (5 June 2010) – 3rd place
4. (Croatia) Gorican (28 August 2010) – 2nd place
5. (Italy) Terenzano (25 September 2010) – 2nd place
6. (Poland) Bydgoszcz (9 October 2010) – 2nd place
7. (Croatia) Goričan (24 September 2011) – 2nd
8. (Poland) Warsaw (18 April 2015) – 2nd place
9. (Czech Republic) Prague (25 June 2016) - 3rd place

=== SGP Finals ===
1. (Denmark) Copenhagen (9 June 2012)

== Other major results ==
Individual Speedway Long Track World Championship

- 2017 – 5 apps (8th) 50pts
- 2018 – 5 apps (8th) 52pts
- 2019 – 5 apps (7th) 50pts
- 2021 – 2 apps (4th) 23pts
- 2022 – 6 apps (3rd) 83pts
- 2023 – 6 apps (2nd) 99pts
- 2024 – 5 apps (4th) 83pts
- 2025 – 4 apps (2nd) pts

Team Long Track World Championship

- 2018 – (France) Morizes 16/46pts (with James Shanes, Zach Wajtknecht & Adam Ellis) Second
- 2019 – (Germany) Vechta 14/41pts (with Zach Wajtknecht, Edward Kennett & Adam Ellis) Fourth
- 2022 - (Germany) Herxheim 4/38pts (with Zach Wajtknecht, James Shanes) 5th
- 2023 - (Netherlands) Roden 25/49pts (with Zach Wajtknecht, Andrew Appleton) 3rd
- 2024 - (France) Morizès 26/46pts (with Zach Wajtknecht, Andrew Appleton, Edward Kennett) 3rd
- 2025 - (Germany) Vechta 17/56pts (with Zach Wajtknecht, Andrew Appleton) champions

European Grasstrack Championship

- 2022 – (United Kingdom) Swingfield - 2nd
- 2023 – (Germany) Werlte - 2nd
- 2024 – (France) Tayoc - Winner

== See also ==
- List of Speedway Grand Prix riders
