= List of Team Long Track World Championship medalists =

This is the complete list of Team Long Track World Championship medalists from 2007 to 2011.

== Medalists ==
Year	Venue	Winners	Runner-up	3rd place
2007	(France) Morizès	Germany (51 pts + 1st) Gerd Riss (21) Stephan Katt (24) Enrico Janoschka (5) Matthias Kröger (9)	Great Britain (44 pts + 2nd) Paul Hurry (20) Andrew Appleton (16) Glen Phillips (15) Mitch Godden (—)	France (39 pts + 1st) Stéphane Tresarrieu (21) Matheiu Tresarieu (18) Christophe Dubernard (8) Phillipe Ostyn (—)
2008	(Germany) Werlte	Germany (55 pts + 1st) Gerd Riss (23) Stephan Katt (7) Bernd Diener (18) Matthias Kröger (16)	Netherlands (45 pts + 2nd) Dirk Fabriek (22) Jannick de Jong (21) Erik Eijbergen (3) Mark Stiekema (5)	Great Britain (40 pts + 1st) Glen Phillips (25) Richard Hall (16) Mitch Godden (8) Vincent Kinchin (—)
2009	(Netherlands) Eenrum	Germany (47 pts + 1st) Gerd Riss (26) Matthias Kröger (19) Richard Speiser (0) Enrico Janoschka (10)	Netherlands (46 pts + 2nd) Jannick de Jong (12) Dirk Fabriek (19) Theo Pijper (22) Mark Stiekema (—)	France (38 pts + 1st) Stéphane Tresarrieu (23) Mathieu Tresarieu (22) Philippe Ostyn (1) Jérome Lespinasse (0)
2010	(France) Morizès	Germany (49 pts + 1st) Matthias Kröger (8) Stephan Katt (19) Richard Speiser (19) Martin Smolinski (11)	France (47 pts + 2nd) Stéphane Tresarrieu (24) Mathieu Tresarieu (20) Jérome Lespinasse (8) Théo Di Palma (2)	Netherlands (42 pts + 1st) Theo Pijper (24) Dirk Fabriek (18) Mark Stiekema (5) Sjoerd Rozenberg (4)
2011	(Germany) Scheeßel	Germany (56 pts + 1st) Stephan Katt (25) Richard Speiser (21) Jörg Tebbe (7) Martin Smolinski (15)	Netherlands (38 pts + 2nd) Jannick De Jong (23) Sjord Rozenberg (1) Mark Stiekema (4) Jeffrey Woortman (13)	Great Britain (36 pts + 1st) Richard Hall (7) Andrew Appleton (22) Glen Phillips (13) Mitch Godden (2)

== See also ==
- Long track motorcycle racing
- List of Speedway World Cup medalists
