= Mitchel Godden =

English motorcycle rider

- Born: 13 February 1975 (age 51); Pembury, England
- Nationality: English

Individual honours
- 2006, 2007, 2009, 2010, 2011: British Sand Ace Championship Winner
- 1999, 2003, 2005, 2009: British Best Pairs Championship Winner
- 2001, 2003, 2008, 2012,2021: South-Eastern Centre Championship Winner
- 1999: Southern Centre Championship Winner
- 2018: Pokal Bergring Cup Winner
- 2007, 2009, 2011: MSC BadWalsee Wolfegg Winner
- 2016: Sidecars Super Series Winner
- 2021,2022,2023,2024: 500cc Sidecar British Champion Winner

Team honours
- 2015 2025: Team Long Track World Championship Winning Manager

Mitchel Stuart Godden (born 13 February 1975) is an English motorcycle rider. He competes in longtrack and grasstrack racing for Solos (1992-2016) and more recently 500cc Sidecars (2015–Present). He is the son of Don Godden who won the Individual Speedway Long Track World Championship in 1969.

Godden followed in his fathers footsteps and started racing in 1992. He started on a 250cc (ex Jeremy Doncaster) Honda red Rocket and rode this for one season before using Godden works 350cc machine and then after a couple of seasons progressed to 500cc class. Godden later progressed to international racing becoming a specialists on German grasstracks and Dutch sandtracks.

In 2015, Godden moved into 500cc sidecar racing with passenger Paul Smith. The pair competed in the United Kingdom and across continental Europe, recording 50 international event victories.

In 2025, Team Godden / Smith became the first ever non Dutch team to win the KNMV Dutch open Sidecar Grasstrack Championships. An event dominated in recent years by the sidecar legend William Matthiessen from the Netherlands.

== Promotion ==
In recent years, Godden has also turned his hand to promotion. He started the charity Kart meeting at Buckmore Park as well as promotion and running of the Invicta International Grasstrack meetings at the Hop Farm and Collier Street 'The Kings of Speed' in 2008, 2011 and 2012. In 2016, he started the Pit Bike Winter Series at Iwade Stadium.

== Management ==
In 2013, Godden on behalf of the ACU took over the manager role of the Great Britain World Longtrack team. That same year, he led the team to the bronze medal, and in 2015, he led the team to LTON championship Victory. The team consisted of Glen Phillips (c), Andrew Appleton, Richard Hall, and James Shanes. His last year in the role was 2018 with his team collecting world championship silver in Morizès France.

Godden has been drafted back into Team GB management on behalf of the ACU in 2025 and his team of track racing riders won FIM GOLD in Vechta Germany. Team GB’s second victory in this competition since its inception in 2007.

The 2025 team of Chris Harris, Zach Wajtknecht, Andrew Appleton, & Cameron Taylor were the top scoring team and went on to max score in the final race for gold.

== World Longtrack Championship ==
=== Individual Championship ===
- 1999 4 app (16th) 18pts

=== Team Championship ===
Rider

- 2007 (France) Morizès – Second (with Paul Hurry, Andrew Appleton, Glen Phillips)
- 2008 (Germany) Werlte – Third (with Richard Hall, Glen Phillips, Vince Kinchin)
- 2011 (Germany) Scheeßel – Third (with Paul Cooper, Andrew Appleton, Glen Phillips)

Manager

- 2013 (England) Folkestone – Third (with Richard Hall, Andrew Appleton, Paul Cooper, Glen Phillips)
- 2014 (Finland) Forssa – Fifth (with Andrew Appleton, Richard Hall, David Howe, Glen Phillips)
- 2015 (Germany) Mühldorf – First (with Andrew Appleton, Richard Hall, James Shanes, Glen Phillips)
- 2016 (Czech Republic) Mariánské Lázně – Fourth (with Andrew Appleton, Richard Hall, James Shanes, Glen Phillips)
- 2017 (Netherlands) Roden – Fourth (with Andrew Appleton, Richard Hall, James Shanes, Edward Kennett)
- 2018 (France) Morizès – Second (with James Shanes, Chris Harris, Zach Wajtknecht, Adam Ellis)
- 2025 (Germany) Vechta – First (with Andrew Appleton, Chris Harris, Zach Wajtknecht, Camoneron Taylor)

== European Grasstrack Championship ==
=== Solos Finals ===
- 2004 (Netherlands) Eenrum (14th) 4pts
- 2008 (Germany) Siddeburen (10th) 11pts
- 2010 (France) La Réole (12th) 9pts
- 2011 (England) Skegness (8th) 14pts
- 2012 (Netherlands) Eenrum (14th) 6pts
- 2015 (Netherlands) Staphorst (11th) 6pts
- 2016 (England) Folkestone (14th) 3pts

=== Solos Semi-finals ===
- 2000 Semi-finalist
- 2003 Semi-finalist
- 2005 Semi-finalist
- 2006 Semi-finalist
- 2009 Semi-finalist
- 2014 Semi-finalist

=== Sidecar Finals ===
- 2017 (France) Tayac (4th) 7pts
- 2018 (Germany) Wertle (2nd) 17pts
- 2019 (Netherlands) Eenrum (3rd) 18pts
- 2022 (Netherlands) Eenrum (2nd) 17pts
- 2023 (Germany) Bad Hersfeld (2nd) 11pts
- 2024 (Netherlands) Uithuizen (2nd) 10pts
- 2025 (Germany) Haunstetton (2nd) 11pts

== British Masters Grasstrack Championship ==
=== Top Ten Finishes ===
- 2005 (England) Northiam (9th)
- 2006 (England) Wadebridge (7th)
- 2007 (England) Long Marston (9th)
- 2008 (England) Rhodes Minnis (4th)
- 2010 (England) Rhodes Minnis (5th)
- 2013 (England) Uddens (7th)
- 2014 (England) Swingfield (6th)
- 2015 (England) Corfe Mullen (9th)
- 2021 (England) Swingfield (3rd)

Other Appearances: 1994, 1995, 1996, 1997, 1998, 1999, 2000, 2001, 2002, 2003, 2009, 2011, 2012.

== British Sidecar Championship ==
- 2016 (England) Frittenden (Second)
- 2017 (England) Ledbury (Second)
- 2018 (England) Chelmsford (Third)
- 2019 (England) Chelmsford (Disqualified)
- 2021 (England) Ledbury (First)
- 2022 (England) Frittenden (First)
- 2023 (England) GTSA (First)
- 2024 (England) Frittenden (First)
- 2025 (England) Lebury (Fourth)

== British Sand Ace Championship ==
- 2006 Guernsey (Champion)
- 2007 Guernsey (Champion)
- 2008 Guernsey (5th)
- 2009 Guernsey (Champion)
- 2010 Guernsey (Champion)
- 2011 Guernsey (Champion)
- 2012 Guernsey (Third)
- 2013 Guernsey (18th)
- 2014 Guernsey (5th)
- 2015 Guernsey (6th)

== Sources ==
- Grasstrackgb
- Polish Historia
- Family History
- Longtrack History
