= 2012 Team Long Track World Championship =

2012 Longtrack World Cup

Seasons
- ← 2011 2013 →

The 2012 Team Long Track World Championship was the sixth annual FIM Team Long Track World Championship. The final took place on 23 June 2012 in Saint-Macaire, France.

== Results ==
- (France) Saint-Macaire
- 23 June 2012

Pos.	Teamm	riders
1	Germany	Stephan Katt 22, Matthias Kröger 11, Jörg Tebbe 9, Bernd Diener 6
2	Great Britain	David Howe 18, Richard Hall 13, Paul Cooper 9, Glen Phillips 9
3	France	Stephane Tresarrieu 20, Mathieu Trésarrieu 19, David Bellego 3, Gabriel Dubernard 0
4	Netherlands	Mark Stiekema 15, Theo Pijper 13, Jannick de Jong 11, Jeffrey Woortman 0
5	Czech Republic	Aleš Dryml Jr. 16, Josef Franc 11, Richard Wolff 3, Michael Hádek 0
6	Finland	Aarni Heikkila 7, Rene Lehtinen 6, Simo Pulli 4, Aki Pekka Mustonen 0

== See also ==
- 2012 Individual Long Track World Championship
- 2012 Speedway World Cup
