= 2010 Team Long Track World Championship =

2010 Longtrack World Cup

Seasons
- ← 2009 2011 →

The 2010 Team Long Track World Championship was the fourth annual FIM Team Long Track World Championship. The final took place on 4 September 2010 in Morizès, France. The Championship was won by the defending champion Germany who beat host team France and The Netherlands. It was fourth champion title for German riders.

== Results ==
- (France) Morizès "Piste du Parc Municipal" (Length: 520 m)
- 4 September 2010 (21:00 UTC+1)
- Referee: (Hungary) Istvan Darago
- Jury President: (United Kingdom) Anthony Noel

| Pos. | National team | Pts. |
|---|---|---|
| 1 | Germany | 49+8 |
| 2 | France | 47+7 |
| 3 | Netherlands | 42+9 |
| 4 | Great Britain | 37+6 |
| 5 | Finland | 24+8 |
| 6 | Czech Republic | 25+7 |

== Heat details ==
| Placing | Team / Rider Name | Total | 1 | 2 | 3 | 4 | 5 | 6 | 7 | 8 | 9 | 10 | 11 | 12 | 13 | 14 | 15 | Pts | 16 | 17 | 18 |
| 1 | Germany | 57 | | | | | | | | | | | | | | | | 49 |
| 1 | (13) Matthias Kröger (c) | 8 | | | 1 | | - | | 5 | | | | 2 | | | | - | 8 | | | - |
| 1 | (14) Stephan Katt | 19 | | | 2 | | 4 | | - | | | | 3 | | | | 5 | 14 | | | 5 |
| 1 | (15) Richard Speiser | 19 | | | 4 | | 5 | | 4 | | | | - | | | | 3 | 16 | | | 3 |
| 1 | (23) Martin Smolinski | 11 | | | | | 3 | | 3 | | | | 5 | | | | X | 11 | | | R |
| 2 | France | 54 | | | | | | | | | | | | | | | | 47 |
| 2 | (4) Stephane Tresarrieu | 24 | 4 | | | | | 5 | | 5 | | 4 | | | | | 4 | 22 | | | 2 |
| 2 | (5) Mathieu Trésarrieu | 20 | 3 | | | | | 4 | | 4 | | 5 | | | | | F | 16 | | | 4 |
| 2 | (6) Jérôme Lespinasse | 8 | 0 | | | | | 2 | | 3 | | - | | | | | 2 | 7 | | | 1 |
| 2 | (20) Théo Di Palma | 2 | | | | | | | | | | 2 | | | | | | 2 |
| 3 | Netherlands | 51 | | | | | | | | | | | | | | | | 42 |
| 3 | (1) Theo Pijper (c) | 24 | 5 | | | 4 | | | | | 4 | | 1 | | | 5 | | 19 | | 5 |
| 3 | (2) Dirk Fabriek | 18 | 2 | | | 2 | | | | | 3 | | 4 | | | 4 | | 15 | | 3 |
| 3 | (3) Mark Stiekema | 5 | 1 | | | - | | | | | 2 | | - | | | 2 | | 5 | | - |
| 3 | (19) Sjoerd Rozenberg | 4 | | | | 3 | | | | | | | 0 | | | | | 3 | | 1 |
| 4 | Great Britain | 43 | | | | | | | | | | | | | | | | 37 |
| 4 | (16) Andrew Appleton | 18 | | | 3 | 5 | | | | R | | | | 2 | 4 | | | 14 | | 4 |
| 4 | (17) Richard Hall | 6 | | | X | 1 | | | | - | | | | 3 | 2 | | | 6 | | 0 |
| 4 | (18) Glen Phillips | 18 | | | 5 | X | | | | 2 | | | | 4 | 5 | | | 16 | | 2 |
| 4 | (24) Chris Mills | 1 | | | | | | | | 1 | | | | | | | | 1 |
| 5 | Finland | 34 | | | | | | | | | | | | | | | | 26 |
| 5 | (7) Joonas Kylmäkorpi (c) | 15 | | 5 | | | | 3 | 2 | | | | | 5 | | R | | 15 | - |
| 5 | (8) Pasi Pulliainen | 8 | | 2 | | | | - | 1 | | | | | 1 | | 1 | | 5 | 3 |
| 5 | (9) Aki-Pekka Mustonen | 7 | | 2 | | | | 1 | 0 | | | | | - | | 3 | | 6 | 1 |
| 5 | (21) Rene Lehtinen | 4 | | | | | | 0 | | | | | | 0 | | | | 0 | 4 |
| 6 | Czech Republic | 32 | | | | | | | | | | | | | | | | 25 |
| 6 | (10) Zdenek Schnederwind (c) | 13 | | 3 | | | R | | | | 5 | X | | | - | | | 8 | 5 |
| 6 | (11) Richard Wolff | 5 | | - | | | 1 | | | | - | 1 | | | 1 | | | 3 | 2 |
| 6 | (12) Pavel Ondrašík | 5 | | 1 | | | - | | | | 1 | 3 | | | X | | | 5 | - |
| 6 | (22) Josef Franc | 9 | | 4 | | | 2 | | | | R | 3 | | | | | | 9 | 0 |
| Placing | Team / Rider Name | Total | 1 | 2 | 3 | 4 | 5 | 6 | 7 | 8 | 9 | 10 | 11 | 12 | 13 | 14 | 15 | Pts | 16 | 17 | 18 |

M - exclusion for exceeding two minute time allowance • T - exclusion for touching the tapes • X - other exclusion • E - retired or mechanical failure • F - fell

| gate A – inside Red | gate B Blue | gate C White | gate D Yellow-Black | gate E Green | gate F – outside Black-White |

== See also ==
- 2010 Individual Long Track World Championship
- 2010 Speedway World Cup
