= Great Britain national long track team =

Great Britain
- Association: Auto-Cycle Union
- FIM code: ACU
- Team manager: Mitchel Godden
- Nation Colour: Red and White

World Championship
Team	2	4	5
Individual	11	14	11

The Great Britain long track team is the national long track motorcycle racing team of Great Britain and is controlled by the Auto-Cycle Union ACU). The team has started every edition of Team Long Track World Championship since its inauguration in 2007. They have been team world champions twice in 2015 and 2025.

== Longtrack of Nations ==
Year	Venue	Placing	Pts	Riders	Ref
2007	(France) Morizès	2	51	Paul Hurry (20), Andrew Appleton (16), Glen Phillips (15), Mitch Godden (—)	
2008	(Germany) Werlte	3	49	Glen Phillips (25), Richard Hall (16), Mitch Godden (8), Vincent Kinchin (—)	
2009	(Netherlands) Eenrum	4	43	Paul Hurry (16), Glen Phillips (11), Andrew Appleton (11), Richard Hall (5)	
2010	(France) Morizès	4	31	Andrew Appleton (14), Richard Hall (6), Glen Phillips (16), Chris Mills (1)	
2011	(Germany) Scheessel	3	36	Paul Cooper (7), Andrew Appleton (17), Glen Phillips (10), Mitch Godden (2)	
2012	(France) Saint-Macaire	2	49	Paul Cooper (9), Glen Phillips (9), Richard Hall (13), David Howe (18)	
2013	(England) Folkestone	3	49	Richard Hall (10), Andrew Appleton (2), Paul Cooper (23), Glen Phillips (14)	
2014	(Finland) Forssa	5	34	Andrew Appleton (6), Richard Hall (9), David Howe (6), Glen Phillips (13)	
2015	(Germany) Muhldorf	1	42	Glen Phillips (14), Richard Hall (20), Andrew Appleton (8), James Shanes (-)	
2016	(Czech Republic) Mariánské Lázně	4	34	Richard Hall (14), Glen Phillips (1), James Shanes (5), Andrew Appleton (14)	
2017	(Netherlands) Roden	6	36	Richard Hall (1), James Shanes (23), Andrew Appleton (5), Edward Kennett (7)	
2018	(France) Morizès	2	46	James Shanes (19), Zach Wajtknecht (6), Chris Harris (16), Adam Ellis (5)	
2019	(Germany) Vechta	4	41	Chris Harris (14), Zach Wajtknecht (16), Edward Kennett (11), Adam Ellis (—)	
Not held in 2020 and 2021 due to COVID-19
2022	(Germany) Herxheim bei Landau/Pfalz	5	38	Chris Harris (4), Zach Wajtknecht (29), James Shanes (5)	
2023	(Netherlands) Roden	3	44	Chris Harris (25), Andrew Appleton (12), Zach Wajtknecht (12), Paul Hurry (—)	
2024	(France) Morizès	2	46	Chris Harris 26, Zach Wajtknecht 14, Andrew Appleton 6, Edward Kennett 0	
2025	(Germany) Vechta	1	56	Zach Wajtknecht 26, Chris Harris 17, Andrew Appleton 13	
2026	(Netherlands) Roden	2	65	Zach Wajtknecht 27, Chris Harris 21, Jake Mulford 9, James Shanes 8	

== World individual longtrack champions and medallists ==
- Simon Wigg (world champion 1985, 1989, 1990, 1993, 1994), (silver 1987, 1995)
- Kelvin Tatum (world champion 1995, 1998, 2000), (silver 2001, 2003, 2004), (bronze 1999, 2002)
- Don Godden (world champion 1969), (silver 1967, 1968, 1970)
- Michael Lee (world champion 1981)
- Zach Wajtknecht (world champion 2025), (silver 2022), (bronze 2024)
- Peter Collins (silver 1986), (bronze 1978, 1985)
- Steve Schofield (silver 1997), (bronze 1998)
- Glen Phillips (silver 2008)
- Chris Harris (silver 2023, 2025), (bronze 2022)
- Chris Morton (bronze 1988)
- Glenn Cunningham (bronze 1997)
- Paul Hurry (bronze 2005)
- Richard Hall (bronze 2013)

== See also ==
- Great Britain national speedway team
- Speedway in the United Kingdom
