= 2016 Team Long Track World Championship =

2016 Longtrack World Cup

Seasons
- ← 2015 2017 →

The 2016 Team Long Track World Championship was the tenth annual FIM Team Long Track World Championship. The final took place on 16 July 2016 in Mariánské Lázně, Czech Republic.

The Netherlands won their second title, having previously won in 2013.

== Results ==
- (Czech Republic) Mariánské Lázně
- 16 July 2016

Pos.	Team	Pts	riders
1	Netherlands	46	Jannick de Jong 18, Dirk Fabriek 15, Theo Pijper 13
2	Germany	44	Martin Smolinski 23, Michael Hartel 14, Jörg Tebbe 5, Stephan Katt 2
3	Czech Republic	42	Hynek Štichauer 18, Josef Franc 18, Martin Malek 6
4	Great Britain	34	Richard Hall 14, Andrew Appleton 14, James Shanes 5, Glen Phillips 1
5	Finland	31	Jesse Mustonen 16, Aki-Pekka Mustonen 14, Rene Lehtinen 1, Aarni Heikkila 0
6	France	28	Mathieu Trésarrieu 16, Dimitri Bergé 9, Theo di Palma 2, Jerome Lespinasse 1

== See also ==
- 2016 Individual Long Track World Championship
- 2016 Speedway World Cup
