= 2009 Team Long Track World Championship =

2009 Longtrack World Cup

Seasons
- ← 2008 2010 →

The 2009 Team Long Track World Championship was the third annual FIM Team Long Track World Championship. The final took place on 16 August 2009 in Eenrum, Netherlands. The championship was won by the defending champion Germany who beat a host team Netherlands in a final heat. France finished third.

== Results ==
- (Netherlands) Eenrum, "Sportpark Eenrum" (Length: 625 m)
- 16 August 2009 (13:30 UTC+1)
- Referee: (Hungary) Istvan Darago
- Jury President: (Germany) Wolfgang Glas

Pos.	National team	Pts.
1	Germany	47+8
2	Netherlands	46+7
3	France	38+8
4	Great Britain	36+7
5	Czech Republic	27+8
6	Finland	31+7

== Heat details ==
Placing	Team / Rider Name	Total	1	2	3	4	5	6	7	8	9	10	11	12	13	14	15	Pts	16	17	18
1	Germany	55																47
1	(13) Gerd Riss	26			5		5		5				5				5	25			1
1	(14) Matthias Kröger	19			4		3		2				3				4	16			3
1	(15) Richard Speiser	0			0		R		-				-				-	0			-
1	(23) Enrico Janoschka	10							1				4				1	6			4
2	Netherlands	53																46
2	(4) Jannick de Jong	12	4					1		1		4					-	10			2
2	(5) Dirk Fabriek	19	R					5		4		3					2	14			5
2	(6) Theo Pijper	22	5					4		5		5					3	22			R
2	(20) Mark Stiekema	0																0
3	France	46																38
3	(7) Stephane Tresarrieu	23		4				3	4					5		3		19		4
3	(8) Mathieu Trésarrieu	22		5				2	3					4		5		19		3
3	(9) Philippe Ostyn	1		0				-	0					-		0		0		1
3	(21) Jérome Lespinasse	0						0						0				0
4	Great Britain	43																36
4	(16) Paul Hurry	16			1	-				3				3	4			11		5
4	(17) Glen Phillips	11			2	4				-				1	2			9		2
4	(18) Andrew Appleton	11			3	5				2				-	1			11		R
4	(24) Richard Hall	5				3				0				2				5
5	Czech Republic	35																27
5	(10) Zdeněk Schneiderwind	17		3			2				T	2			5			12	5
5	(11) Richard Wolff	13		2			4				2	1			3			12	1
5	(12) Pavel Ondrašík	5		1			1				1	0			0			3	2
5	(22) Marek Čejka	0																0
6	Finland	38																31
6	(1) Joonas Kylmäkorpi	17	2			2					5		2			2		13	4
6	(2) Kaj Laukkanen	15	3			1					4		0			4		12	3
6	(3) Rene Lehtinen	1	1			0					-		-			-		1	0
6	(19) Aki-Pekka Mustonen	5									3		1			1		5
Placing	Team / Rider Name	Total	1	2	3	4	5	6	7	8	9	10	11	12	13	14	15	Pts	16	17	18

M - exclusion for exceeding two minute time allowance • T - exclusion for touching the tapes • X - other exclusion • E - retired or mechanical failure • F - fell

gate A – inside Red	gate B Blue	gate C White	gate D Yellow-Black	gate E Green	gate F – outside Black-White

== See also ==
- 2009 Individual Long Track World Championship
- 2009 Speedway World Cup
