= 2011 Team Long Track World Championship =

2011 Longtrack World Cup

Seasons
- ← 2010 2012 →

The 2011 Team Long Track World Championship was the fifth annual FIM Team Long Track World Championship. The final took place on 21 August 2011 in Scheeßel, Germany. The Championship was won by the defending champion Germany who beat the Netherlands and Great Britain. It was fifth champion title for German riders.

== Results ==
- (Germany) Scheeßel, Lower Saxony
- 21 August 2011
- Eichenring Scheessel (Length: 1.000 m)
- Referee: (Poland) Wojciech Grodzki
- Jury President: (United Kingdom) Anthony Steele

Pos.	National team	Pts.
1	Germany	56+12
2	Netherlands	38+3
3	Great Britain	36+8
4	Czech Republic	35+7
5	France	34+8
6	Finland	26+7

=== Heat details ===
Placing	Team / Rider Name	Total	1	2	3	4	5	6	7	8	9	10	11	12	13	14	15	Pts	16	17	18
1	Germany	68																56
1	(10) Stephan Katt (c)	25		5			5				-	5			5			20			5
1	(11) Richard Speiser	21		4			4				5	4			-			17			4
1	(12) Jörg Tebbe	7		2			-				3	-			2			7			-
1	(22) Martin Smolinski	15					2				4	3			3			12			3
2	Netherlands	41																38
2	(7) Jannick de Jong (c)	23		3				4	5					4		5		21			2
2	(8) Sjord Rozenberg	1		1				0	-					-		-		1			-
2	(9) Mark Stiekema	4		0				-	1					2		1		4			R
2	(21) Jeffrey Woortman	13						3	3					3		3		12			1
3	Great Britain	44																36
3	(4) Richard Hall (c)	7	1					-		3		0					3	7		0
3	(5) Andrew Appleton	22	5					5		R		2					5	17		5
3	(6) Glen Phillips	13	4					2		2		-					2	10		3
3	(20) Mitch Godden	2						1				1						2
4	Czech Republic	42																35
4	(16) Josef Franc	25			2	5				5				5	4			21		4
4	(17) Aleš Dryml, Jr. (c)	9			3	T				4				R	-			7		2
4	(18) Richard Wolff	2			1	-				1				-	0			2		-
4	(24) Pavel Ondrašík	6				3								1	1			5		1
5	France	42																34
5	(13) Stephane Tresarrieu (c)	9			4		1		R				-				4	9	T
5	(14) Mathieu Trésarrieu	17			5		3		4				5				R	17	-
5	(15) Jérôme Lespinasse	11			-		0		2				3				1	6	5
5	(23) Théo Di Palma	5			0								2					2	3
6	Finland	33																26
6	(1) Joonas Kylmäkorpi (c)	0	-			-					-		-			-		0	-
6	(2) Aki-Pekka Mustonen	16	2			4					2		4			2		14	2
6	(3) Rene Lehtinen	14	3			1					1		1			4		10	4
6	(19) Simo Pulli	3	0			2					0		0			0		2	1
Placing	Team / Rider Name	Total	1	2	3	4	5	6	7	8	9	10	11	12	13	14	15	Pts	16	17	18

M - exclusion for exceeding two minute time allowance • T - exclusion for touching the tapes • X - other exclusion • E - retired or mechanical failure • F - fell

gate A – inside Red	gate B Blue	gate C White	gate D Yellow-Black	gate E Green	gate F – outside Black-White

== See also ==
- 2011 Individual Long Track World Championship
- 2011 Speedway World Cup
