= 2007 Team Long Track World Championship =

2007 Longtrack World Cup

Seasons
- ← none 2008 →

The 2007 Team Long Track World Championship was the first annual FIM Team Long Track World Championship. The final took place on 1 September 2007 in Morizès, France. The championship was won by Germany who beat Great Britain in a final heat. Host team France finished third.

== Results ==
- (France) Morizès "Piste du Parc Municipal" (Length: 520 m)
- 1 September 2007 (21:00 UTC+1)

| Pos. | National team | Pts. |
|---|---|---|
| 1 | Germany | 51+8 |
| 2 | Great Britain | 44+7 |
| 3 | France | 39+8 |
| 4 | Czech Republic | 37+7 |
| 5 | Netherlands | 35+12 |
| 6 | Finland | 19+3 |

== Heat details ==
| Placing | Team / Rider Name | Total | 1 | 2 | 3 | 4 | 5 | 6 | 7 | 8 | 9 | 10 | 11 | 12 | 13 | 14 | 15 | Pts | 16 | 17 | 18 |
| 1 | Germany | 59 | | | | | | | | | | | | | | | | 51 |
| 1 | (16) Gerd Riss | 21 | | | 4 | 4 | | | | 5 | | | | 3 | - | | | 16 | | | 5 |
| 1 | (17) Stephan Katt | 24 | | | 5 | 5 | | | | 4 | | | | 4 | 3 | | | 21 | | | 3 |
| 1 | (18) Enrico Janoschka | 5 | | | 2 | 1 | | | | - | | | | - | 2 | | | 5 | | | - |
| 1 | (24) Matthias Kroger | 9 | | | | | | | | 3 | | | | 2 | 4 | | | 9 | | | R |
| 2 | Great Britain | 51 | | | | | | | | | | | | | | | | 44 |
| 2 | (1) Paul Hurry | 20 | 4 | | | 0 | | | | | 4 | | 5 | | | 3 | | 16 | | | 4 |
| 2 | (2) Andrew Appleton | 16 | 5 | | | 2 | | | | | 1 | | 3 | | | 4 | | 15 | | | 1 |
| 2 | (3) Glen Phillips | 15 | 3 | | | 3 | | | | | 3 | | 2 | | | 2 | | 13 | | | 2 |
| 2 | (19) Mitch Godden | 0 | | | | | | | | | | | | | | | | 0 |
| 3 | France | 47 | | | | | | | | | | | | | | | | 39 |
| 3 | (13) Stéphane Tresarrieu | 21 | | | 1 | | 4 | | 5 | | | | 4 | | | | 4 | 18 | | 3 |
| 3 | (14) Matheiu Tresarieu | 18 | | | 3 | | 2 | | 3 | | | | 1 | | | | 5 | 14 | | 4 |
| 3 | (15) Christophe Dubernard | 8 | | | 0 | | 3 | | 1 | | | | 0 | | | | 3 | 7 | | 1 |
| 3 | (23) Phillipe Ostyn | 0 | | | | | | | | | | | | | | | | 0 |
| 4 | Czech Republic | 44 | | | | | | | | | | | | | | | | 37 |
| 4 | (10) Zdenek Schneiderwind | 23 | | 5 | | | 5 | | | | 5 | 3 | | | 0 | | | 18 | | 5 |
| 4 | (11) Richard Wolff | 6 | | 0 | | | 1 | | | | 0 | 4 | | | 1 | | | 6 | | 0 |
| 4 | (12) Pavel Ondrašík | 15 | | 1 | | | 0 | | | | 2 | 5 | | | 5 | | | 13 | | 2 |
| 4 | (22) Karel Kadlec | 0 | | | | | | | | | | | | | | | | 0 |
| 5 | Netherlands | 47 | | | | | | | | | | | | | | | | 35 |
| 5 | (7) Dirk Fabriek | 3 | | 3 | | | | R | 0 | | | | | - | | 0 | | 3 | - |
| 5 | (8) Jannick de Jong | 12 | | 2 | | | | 3 | 2 | | | | | 1 | | 1 | | 9 | 3 |
| 5 | (9) Theo Pijper | 28 | | 4 | | | | 5 | 4 | | | | | 5 | | 5 | | 23 | 5 |
| 5 | (21) Erik Eijbergen | 4 | | | | | | | | | | | | 0 | | | | 0 | 4 |
| 6 | Finland | 22 | | | | | | | | | | | | | | | | 19 |
| 6 | (4) Mikko Rahko | 8 | 2 | | | | | 2 | | 1 | | 1 | | | | | 1 | 7 | 1 |
| 6 | (5) Rene Lehtinen | 13 | 1 | | | | | 4 | | 2 | | 2 | | | | | 2 | 11 | 2 |
| 6 | (6) Markus Helin | 1 | 0 | | | | | 1 | | 0 | | 0 | | | | | 0 | 1 | 0 |
| Placing | Team / Rider Name | Total | 1 | 2 | 3 | 4 | 5 | 6 | 7 | 8 | 9 | 10 | 11 | 12 | 13 | 14 | 15 | Pts | 16 | 17 | 18 |

M - exclusion for exceeding two minute time allowance • T - exclusion for touching the tapes • X - other exclusion • E - retired or mechanical failure • F - fell

| gate A – inside Red | gate B Blue | gate C White | gate D Yellow-Black | gate E Green | gate F – outside Black-White |

== See also ==
- 2007 Individual Long Track World Championship
- 2007 Speedway World Cup
