= 2008 Team Long Track World Championship =

2008 Longtrack World Cup

Seasons
- ← 2007 2009 →

The 2008 Team Long Track World Championship was the second annual FIM Team Long Track World Championship. The final took place on 24 August 2008 in Werlte, Germany. The championship was won by host team and the defending champion Germany who beat Netherlands in a final heat. Great Britain finished third.

== Results ==
- (Germany) Werlte "Hümmlingring-Arena" (Length: 541 m)
- 24 August 2008 (13:00 UTC+1)
- Referee: (Poland) Wojciech Grodzki
- Jury President: (Hungary) Janos Nadasdi

Pos.	National team	Pts.
1	Germany	55+9
2	Netherlands	45+6
3	Great Britain	40+9
4	Finland	30+6
5	Czech Republic	28+8
6	France	27+7

== Heat details ==
Placing	Team / Rider Name	Total	1	2	3	4	5	6	7	8	9	10	11	12	13	14	15	Pts	16	17	18
1	Germany	64																55
1	(7) Gerd Riss	23		4				5	-					4		5		18			5
1	(8) Stephan Katt	7		3				-	2					-		2		7			-
1	(9) Bernd Diener	18		5				3	5					5		-		18			T
1	(21) Matthias Kröger	16						4	4					3		1		12			4
2	Netherlands	51																45
2	(1) Dirk Fabriek	22	5			5					R		5			4		19			3
2	(2) Jannick de Jong	21	4			4					5		3			3		19			2
2	(3) Erik Eijbergen	3	2			1					-		-			-		3			-
2	(19) Mark Stiekema	5									4		0			0		4			1
3	Great Britain	49																40
3	(13) Glen Phillips	25			5		5		3				2				5	20		5
3	(14) Richard Hall	16			2		4		R				4				2	12		4
3	(15) Mitch Godden	8			1		2		1				1				3	8		0
3	(23) Vincent Kinchin	0																0
4	Finland	36																30
4	(16) Kaj Laukkanen	12			3	3				4				R	0			10		2
4	(17) Rene Lehtinen	16			4	2				3				2	4			15		1
4	(18) Aki-Pekka Mustonen	7			R	0				-				1	3			4		3
4	(24) Jan-Eric Korkemaki	1								1								1
5	Czech Republic	36																28
5	(4) Zdeněk Schneiderwind	0	Fx					-		0		-					-	0	-
5	(5) Richard Wolff	22	3					2		5		4					4	18	4
5	(6) Pavel Ondrašík	13	1					1		2		5					1	10	3
5	(20) Karel Kadlec	1						0				0					0	0	1
6	France	34																27
6	(10) Stephane Tresarrieu	21		2			3				3	3			5			16	5
6	(11) Sebastien Tresarrieu	0		-			-				-	-			-			0	-
6	(12) Jérome Lespinasse	6		0			1				1	1			1			4	2
6	(22) Theo di Palma	7		1			F				2	2			2			7	F
Placing	Team / Rider Name	Total	1	2	3	4	5	6	7	8	9	10	11	12	13	14	15	Pts	16	17	18

M - exclusion for exceeding two minute time allowance • T - exclusion for touching the tapes • X - other exclusion • E - retired or mechanical failure • F - fell

gate A – inside Red	gate B Blue	gate C White	gate D Yellow-Black	gate E Green	gate F – outside Black-White

== See also ==
- 2008 Individual Long Track World Championship
- 2008 Speedway World Cup
