= 2013 Team Long Track World Championship =

2013 Longtrack World Cup

Seasons
- ← 2012 2014 →

The 2013 Team Long Track World Championship was the seventh annual FIM Team Long Track World Championship. The final took place on 18 August 2013 in Folkestone, England.

== Results ==
- (England) Folkestone
- 18 August 2013

Pos.	Team	Pts	riders
1	Netherlands	65	Theo Pijper 30, Jannick de Jong 21, Dirk Fabriek 14
2	France	63	Dimitri Bergé 21, Mathieu Trésarrieu 16, Stephane Tresarrieu 16, Theo Di Palma 10
3	Great Britain	49	Glen Phillips 23, Paul Cooper 14, Richard Hall 10, Andrew Appleton 2
4	Germany	44	Stephan Katt 16, Jörg Tebbe 13, Enrico Janoschka 8, Richard Speiser 7
5	Australia	36	Cameron Woodward 25, Rodney McDonald 7, Hunter Anderson 4
6	Finland	28	Markku Autio 16, Aarni Heikkila 7, Simo Pulli 5
7	Czech Republic	23	Josef Franc 11, Karel Kadlec 8, Richard Wolff 4

== Scorers ==
(Netherlands)	NETHERLANDS	65
No	Rider Name	Pts.	Heats
19	Jannick de Jong	21	4,4,2,3,4,4
20	Dirk Fabriek	14	R,3,1,4,3,3
21	Theo Pjiper	30	5,5,5,5,5,5
28	Mark Stiekma - RES	0	-

(France)	FRANCE	63
No	Rider Name	Pts.	Heats
4	Stephane Tresarrieu	16	4,3,4,0,-,5
5	Mathieu Tresarrieu	16	3,-,-,4,5,4
6	Dimitri Berge	21	5,5,2,3,4,2
23	Theo di Palma - RES	10	-,4,3,-,3,-

(United Kingdom)	GREAT BRITAIN	49
No	Rider Name	Pts.	Heats
1	Richard Hall	10	1,1,3,3,2,F
2	Andrew Appleton	2	0,2,-,-,-,-
3	Glen Phillips	23	2,3,4,4,5,5
22	Paul Cooper - RES	14	-,-,5,2,3,4

(Germany)	GERMANY	44
No	Rider Name	Pts.	Heats
13	Stephan Katt	16	3,-,5,1,4,3
14	Richard Speiser	7	5,F,1,-,-,1
15	Jorg Tebbe	13	4,2,-,2,5,0
26	Enrico Janoschka - RES	8	-,5,0,R,3,-

(Australia)	AUSTRALIA	36
No	Rider Name	Pts.	Heats
10	Cameron Woodward	25	5,4,5,5,2,5
11	Hunter Anderson	4	4,Fx,-,-,-,-
12	Kozza Smith	NS	-,-,-,-,-,-
25	Rodney McDonald - RES	7	X,3,F,X,1,3

(Finland)	FINLAND	28
No	Rider Name	Pts.	Heats
16	Aarni Heikkila	7	R,X,3,2,X,2
17	Markku Autio	16	2,2,4,1,3,4
18	Simo Pulli	5	1,1,T,R,2,1
27	No Rider - RES	-	-,-,-,-,-,-

(Czech Republic)	CZECH REPUBLIC	23
No	Rider Name	Pts.	Heats
7	Josef Franc	11	3,X,-,5,2,1
8	Richard Wolff	4	2,2,R,-,-,-
9	Karel Kadlec	8	X,1,2,2,1,2
24	No Rider - RES	-	-,-,-,-,-,-

== See also ==
- 2013 World Longtrack Championship
- 2013 Speedway World Cup
