= 2015 Team Long Track World Championship =

Long Track World Cup Championship

2015 Longtrack World Cup

Seasons
- ← 2014 2016 →

The 2015 Team Long Track World Championship was the ninth annual FIM Team Long Track World Championship. The final took place on 28 June 2015 in Mühldorf, Germany. Great Britain won the event for the first time.

== Results ==
- (Germany) Mühldorf
- 28 June 2015

Pos.	Team	Pts	riders
1	Great Britain	42	Richard Hall 20, Glen Phillips 14, Andrew Appleton 8, James Shanes 0
2	Germany	41	Erik Riss 18, Michael Hartel 14, Jörg Tebbe 9, Stephan Katt 0
3	Finland	41	Aki-Pekka Mustonen 23, Jesse Mustonen 14, Aarni Heikkila 3, Matias Maenpaa 1
4	France	40	Mathieu Trésarrieu 18, Stephane Tresarrieu 14, Dimitri Bergé 4, Theo di Palma 4
5	Netherlands	31	Jannick de Jong 23, Sjoerd Rozenberg 5, Henry van der Steen 3
6	Czech Republic	30	Josef Franc 18, Richard Wolff 7, Michal Dudek 5, Michal Skurla 0

== Scorers ==
(United Kingdom)	GREAT BRITAIN	42
No	Rider Name	Pts.	Heats
13	Glen Phillips	14	2,4,3,2,3
14	Andrew Appleton	8	1,2,2,1,2
15	Richard Hall	20	5,R,5,5,5
23	James Shanes - RES	0	-

(Germany)	GERMANY	41*
No	Rider Name	Pts.	Heats
1	Jorg Tebbe	9	2,3,-,0,4
2	Michael Hartel	14	4,4,3,3,FX
3	Stephan Katt	0	-,-,-,-,-
19	Erik Riss - RES	18	3,2,4,4,5

(Finland)	FINLAND	41*
No	Rider Name	Pts.	Heats
10	Jesse Mustonen	14	2,4,3,2,3
11	Aki-Pekka Mustonen	23	5,5,5,4,4
12	Aarni Heikkila	3	0,-,1,1,1
22	Matias Maenpaa - RES	1	-,1,-,-,-

(France)	FRANCE	40
No	Rider Name	Pts.	Heats
7	Stephane Tresarrieu	14	2,5,0,4,3
8	Mathieu Tresarrieu	18	4,3,4,5,2
9	Dimitri Berge	4	1,2,1,-,-
21	Theo di Palma - RES	4	-,-,-,3,1

(Netherlands)	NETHERLANDS	31
No	Rider Name	Pts.	Heats
4	Jannick de Jong	23	5,4,5,5,4
5	Henry Van Der Steen	3	0,1,2,0,0
6	Sjoerd Rozenberg	5	1,0,1,2,1
20	NO RIDER - RES	-	-,-,-,-,-

(Czech Republic)	CZECH REPUBLIC	30
No	Rider Name	Pts.	Heats
16	Josef Franc	18	3,5,4,1,5
17	Richard Wolff	7	0,-,3,2,2
18	Michal Dudek	5	4,1,0,0,0
24	Michal Skurla - RES	0	-,0,-,-,-

- Jorg Tebbe beat Jesse Mustonen in a Run-off for the Silver Medal

== See also ==
- 2015 World Longtrack Championship
- 2015 Speedway World Cup
