= 2014 Team Long Track World Championship =

2014 Longtrack World Cup

Seasons
- ← 2013 2015 →

The 2014 Team Long Track World Championship was the eighth annual FIM Team Long Track World Championship. The final took place on 23 August 2014 in Forssa, Finland.

== Results ==
- (Finland) Forssa
- 23 August 2014

| Pos. | Team | Pts | riders |
|---|---|---|---|
| 1 | Germany | 45 | Erik Riss 24, Jörg Tebbe 11, Stephan Katt 6, Enrico Janoschka 4 |
| 2 | Netherlands | 41 | Theo Pijper 18, Jannick de Jong 13, Dirk Fabriek 10, Henry van der Steen 0 |
| 3 | France | 41 | Mathieu Trésarrieu 21, Stephane Tresarrieu 18, Theo di Palma 2 |
| 4 | Finland | 41 | Kauko Nieminen 20, Jesse Mustonen 18, Markku Autio 2, Aarni Heikkila 1 |
| 5 | Great Britain | 34 | David Howe 13, Richard Hall 9, Andrew Appleton 6, Glen Phillips 6 |
| 6 | Czech Republic | 23 | Josef Franc 13, Richard Wolff 10, Jan Klatovsky 0 |

== See also ==
- 2014 Individual Long Track World Championship
- 2014 Speedway World Cup
