= Netherlands national long track team =

Netherlands
- Association: Dutch Motorsport Union nl:Koninklijke Nederlandse Motorrijders Vereniging
- FIM code: KNMV
- Nation Colour: Red, White and Blue

World Championship
Team	4	5	2
Individual	2	4	3

The Netherlands national long track team is the national long track motorcycle racing team of Netherlands and is controlled by the Dutch Motorsport Union (KNMV). The team has started every edition of Team Long Track World Championship since its inauguration in 2007. They have been team world champions three times in 2013, 2016 and 2023.

== Longtrack of Nations ==
Year	Venue	Placing	Pts	Riders	Ref
2007	(France) Morizès	5	47	Theo Pijper (28), Jannick de Jong (12), Erik Eijbergen (4), Dirk Fabriek (3)	
2008	(Germany) Werlte	1	51	Dirk Fabriek (22), Jannick de Jong (21), Mark Stiekema (5), Erik Eijbergen (3)	
2009	(Netherlands) Eenrum	1	53	Theo Pijper (22), Dirk Fabriek (19), Jannick de Jong (12), Mark Stiekema (—)	
2010	(France) Morizès	3	51	Theo Pijper 24, Dirk Fabriek 18, Mark Stiekema 5, Sjoerd Rozenberg 4	
2011	(Germany) Scheessel	1	41	Jannick de Jong 23, Jeffrey Woortman 13, Mark Stiekema 4, Sjord Rozenberg 1	
2012	(France) Saint-Macaire	4	39	Mark Stiekema 15, Theo Pijper 13, Jannick de Jong 11, Jeffrey Woortman 0	
2013	(England) Folkestone	1	65	Theo Pijper 30, Jannick de Jong 21, Dirk Fabriek 14	
2014	(Finland) Forssa	1	41	Theo Pijper 18, Jannick de Jong 13, Dirk Fabriek 10, Henry van der Steen 0	
2015	(Germany) Muhldorf	5	31	Jannick de Jong 23, Sjoerd Rozenberg 5, Henry van der Steen 3	
2016	(Czech Republic) Mariánské Lázně	1	46	Jannick de Jong 18, Dirk Fabriek 15, Theo Pijper 13	
2017	(Netherlands) Roden	3	49	Romano Hummel 20, Theo Pijper 18, Dirk Fabriek 11	
2018	(France) Morizès	4	34	Theo Pijper 20, Dave Meijerink 10, Lars Zandvliet 4	
2019	(Germany) Vechta	5	37	Theo Pijper 11, Dave Meijerink 10, Henry Van Der Steen 3, Lars Zandvliet 3	
Not held in 2020 and 2021 due to COVID-19
2022	(Germany) Herxheim bei Landau/Pfalz	4	42	Romano Hummel 29, Theo Pijper 23, Dave Meijerink 0	
2023	(Netherlands) Roden	1	64	Romano Hummel 30, Dave Meijerink 17, Mika Meijer 10, Jannick de Jong 7	
2024	(France) Morizès	7	31	Mika Meijer 13, Henry Van Der Steen 13, Rene Van Weele 5	
2025	(Germany) Vechta	1	49	Romano Hummel 18, Dave Meijerink 17, Mika Meijer 14	

== World individual champions and medallists ==
- Jannick de Jong (world champion 2015), (silver 2013, 2014, 2016)
- Romano Hummel (world champion 2021)
- Theo Pijper (silver 2010), (bronze 2021)
- Dirk Fabriek (bronze 2008, 2009)

== See also ==
- Sport in the Netherlands
