= France national long track team =

French motorcycle racing team

France
- Association: French Motorcycle Federation; Fédération Française de Motocyclisme
- FIM code: FFM
- Team manager: Christophe Dubernard
- Nation Colour: Blue, White and Red

World Championship
Team	2	4	5
Individual	—	—	—

The France national long track team is the national long track motorcycle racing team of France and is controlled by the French Motorcycle Federation. The team started in all editions of Team Long Track World Championship and won a bronze medal twice (2007, 2009).

== Competition ==
Team Long Track World Championship
Year & venue	Pts.	Riders	
2007 (France) Morizès	3	47	Stéphane Trésarrieu (21), Mathieu Trésarrieu (18), Christophe Dubernard (8), Phillipe Ostyn (—)
2008 (Germany) Werlte	6	34	Stéphane Trésarrieu (21), Theo di Palma (7), Jérome Lespinasse (6), Sebastien Tresarieu (—)
2009 (Netherlands) Eenrum	3	46	Stéphane Trésarrieu (23), Mathieu Trésarrieu (22), Philippe Ostyn (1), Jérome Lespinasse (0)
2010 (France) Morizès	2	45	Stéphane Trésarrieu (22), Mathieu Trésarrieu (16), Jerome Lespinasse (7), Theo di Palma 2
2011 (Germany) Scheessel	5	34	Stéphane Trésarrieu (8), Mathieu Trésarrieu (17), Jerome Lespinasse (6), Theo Di Palma (3)
2012 (France) Saint-Macaire	3	42	Stéphane Trésarrieu (20), Mathieu Trésarrieu (19), David Bellego (3), Gabrial Dubernard ()
2013 (United Kingdom) Folkestone	2	63	Stéphane Trésarrieu (16), Mathieu Trésarrieu (16), Dimitri Bergé (21), Theo Di Palma (10)
2014 (Finland) Forssa	3	41	Stéphane Trésarrieu (18), Mathieu Trésarrieu (21), Theo Di Palma (2)
2015 (Germany) Mühldorf	4	40	Stéphane Trésarrieu (14), Mathieu Trésarrieu (18), Dimitri Bergé (4), Theo Di Palma (4)
2016 (Czech Republic) Mariánské Lázně	6	28	Mathieu Trésarrieu (16), Dimitri Bergé (9), Theo Di Palma (2), Jerome Lespinasse (1)
2017 (Czech Republic) Roden	2	54	Stéphane Trésarrieu (15), Mathieu Trésarrieu (18), Dimitri Bergé (21), Gaetan Stella (-)
2018 (France) Morizès	1	54	Mathieu Trésarrieu (19), Dimitri Bergé (22), David Bellego (12), Stéphane Trésarrieu (1)

=== Riders ===
Riders who have started in Team Long Track World Championship Finals:

Competitor	Gold	Silver	Bronze	Appearances
David Bellego	1	0	0	2018
Dimitri Bergé	1	2	1	2012, 2013, 2015, 2017, 2018
Christophe Dubernard	0	0	0	2007
Gabrial Dubernard	0	0	1	2012
Jérome Lespinasse	0	1	1	2008, 2009, 2010, 2011, 2016
Phillipe Ostyn	0	0	3	2007, 2009
Theo di Palma	0	2	0	2008, 2010, 2011, 2013, 2014, 2015, 2016
Gaétan Stella	0	1	0	2017
Mathieu Trésarrieu	1	3	4	2007, 2009, 2010, 2011, 2012, 2013, 2014, 2015, 2016, 2017, 2018
Sebastien Trésarrieu	0	0	0	2008
Stéphane Trésarrieu	1	3	4	2007, 2009, 2010, 2011, 2012, 2013, 2014, 2015, 2017, 2018

== See also ==
- France national speedway team
