= Germany national long track team =

German longtrack speedway team

Germany
- Association: German Motor Union; Deutscher Motor Sport Bund
- FIM code: DMSB
- Team manager: Josef Hukelmann
- Nation Colour: Black, Red and Yellow

World Championship
| Team | 10 | 4 | 2 |
| Individual | 32 | 28 | 26 |

The Germany national long track team is the national longtrack motorcycle speedway team of Germany and is controlled by the Deutscher Motor Sport Bund (DMSB).

== History ==
The German longtrack team are traditionally the strongest nation in the world, with many of their riders prioritising a career in longtrack instead of the popular conventional oval form of speedway. The first Individual Speedway Long Track World Championship was held in 1957 (known as the European Championship at the time) and the West German/German team won 16 of the first 40 individual titles from 1957 to 1996. Since the advent of the Grand Prix series in 1997 they have continued the success, winning another 16 titles up to the end of the 2023 season.

Since the creation of the World Longtrack team championship in 2007, now called the (FIM Long Track of Nations), Germany have won 9 of the 15 editions (up to the end of 2023).

== Longtrack of Nations ==
| Year | Venue | Placing | Pts | Riders | Ref |
| 2007 | (France) Morizès | 1 | 59 | Stephan Katt (24), Gerd Riss (21), Matthias Kröger (9), Enrico Janoschka (5) | |
| 2008 | (Germany) Werlte | 1 | 64 | Gerd Riss (23), Bernd Diener (18), Matthias Kröger (16), Stephan Katt (7) | |
| 2009 | (Netherlands) Eenrum | 1 | 55 | Gerd Riss (26), Matthias Kröger (19), Enrico Janoschka (10), Richard Speiser (0) | |
| 2010 | (France) Morizès | 1 | 57 | Matthias Kröger (8), Stephan Katt (19), Richard Speiser (19), Martin Smolinski (11) | |
| 2011 | (Germany) Scheessel | 1 | 68 | Stephan Katt (25), Richard Speiser (21), Martin Smolinski (15), Jörg Tebbe (7) | |
| 2012 | (France) Saint-Macaire | 1 | 48 | Stephan Katt (22), Matthias Kröger (11), Jörg Tebbe (9), Bernd Diener (6) | |
| 2013 | (England) Folkestone | 4 | 44 | Stephan Katt 16, Jörg Tebbe 13, Enrico Janoschka 8, Richard Speiser 7 | |
| 2014 | (Finland) Forssa | 1 | 45 | Erik Riss (24), Jörg Tebbe (11), Stephan Katt (6), Enrico Janoschka (4) | |
| 2015 | (Germany) Mühldorf | 2 | 41 | Erik Riss 18, Michael Hartel 14, Jörg Tebbe 9, Stephan Katt 0 | |
| 2016 | (Czech Republic) Mariánské Lázně | 2 | 44 | Martin Smolinski 23, Michael Hartel 14, Jörg Tebbe 5, Stephan Katt 2 | |
| 2017 | (Netherlands) Roden | 1 | 61 | Matthias Kröger (8), Martin Smolinski (28), Michael Härtel (21), Lukas Fienhage (11), Stephan Katt (0) | |
| 2018 | (France) Morizès | 3 | 38 | Lukas Fienhage 16, Jörg Tebbe 15, Danny Maassen 7, Jens Benneker 0 | |
| 2019 | (Germany) Vechta | 2 | 59 | Lukas Fienhage 24, Martin Smolinski 24, Max Dilger 11 | |
Not held in 2020 and 2021 due to COVID-19
| 2022 | (Germany) Herxheim bei Landau/Pfalz | 1 | 45+12 | Gerd Riss (35), Lukas Fienhage (17), Max Dilger (2) | |
| 2023 | (Netherlands) Roden | 2 | 57 | Erik Riss 29, Martin Smolinski 18, Jörg Tebbe 9, Stephan Katt 1 | |
| 2024 | (France) Morizès | 1 | 68 | Lukas Fienhage (29), Erik Riss (25), Max Dilger (14) | |
| 2025 | (Germany) Vechta | 3 | 48 | Lukas Fienhage 23, Stephan Katt 13, Mario Niedermeier 12 | |

== World individual longtrack champions ==
- Gerd Riss (8) 1991, 1996, 1999, 2001, 2004, 2007, 2008, 2009
- Karl Maier (4) 1980, 1982, 1987, 1988
- Robert Barth (4) 2002, 2003, 2005, 2006
- Josef Hofmeister (3) 1958, 1959, 1960
- Manfred Poschenreider (3) 1966, 1967, 1968
- Egon Müller (3) 1974, 1975, 1978
- Martin Smolinski (3) 2018, 2023, 2024
- Erik Riss (2) 2014, 2016
- Alois Wiesböck (1) 1979
- Tommy Dunker (1) 1997
- Lukas Fienhage (1) 2020

== National longtrack championship ==
| Year | Winners | Runner-up | 3rd place |
West German Longtrack Championship
| 1967 | Heinrich Sprenger | Manfred Poschenreider | Rainer Jüngling |
| 1968 | Manfred Poschenreider | Rudi Kastl | Hans Zierk |
| 1969 | Manfred Poschenreider | Georg Purzer | Rudi Kastl |
| 1970 | Gottfried Schwarze | Horst Kinkelbur | Rudi Kastl |
| 1971 | Manfred Poschenreider | Josef Angermüller | Hans Siegl |
| 1972 | Hans Siegl | Alois Wiesböck | Manfred Poschenreider |
| 1973 | Egon Müller | Manfred Poschenreider | Waldemar Bacik |
| 1974 | Alois Wiesböck | Otto Lantenhammer | Josef Angermüller |
| 1975 | Egon Müller | Hans Wassermann | Georg Hack |
| 1976 | Alois Wiesböck | Egon Müller | Josef Angermüller |
| 1977 | Egon Müller | Wilhelm Kall | Karl Maier |
| 1978 | Alois Wiesböck | Egon Müller | Wilhelm Duden |
| 1979 | Karl Maier | Egon Müller | Wilhelm Duden |
| 1980 | Karl Maier | Josef Aigner | Egon Müller |
| 1981 | Alois Wiesböck | Christoph Betzl | Karl Maier |
| 1982 | Egon Müller | Georg Gilgenreiner | Alois Wiesböck |
| 1983 | Karl Maier | Hans-Otto Pingel | Georg Hack |
| 1984 | Egon Müller | Hans-Otto Pingel | Josef Aigner |
| 1985 | Egon Müller | Karl Maier | Michael Datzmann |
| 1986 | Klaus Lausch | Robert Gührer | Karl Maier |
| 1987 | Karl Maier | Wilhelm Duden | Klaus Lausch |
| 1988 | Gerd Riss | Karl Maier | Klaus Lausch |
| 1989 | Karl Maier | Egon Müller | Alois Bachhuber |
| 1990 | Karl Maier | Hans-Otto Pingel | Andre Pollehn |
German Longtrack Championship
| 1991 | Gerd Riss | Klaus Lausch | Georg Limbrunner |
| 1992 | Karl Maier | Uwe Gessner | Gerd Riss |
| 1993 | Karl Maier | Gerd Riss | Marvyn Cox |
| 1994 | Robert Barth | Gerd Riss | Marvyn Cox |
| 1995 | Gerd Riss | Karl Maier | Bernd Diener |
| 1996 | Gerd Riss | Karl Maier | Bernd Diener |
| 1997 | Gerd Riss | Tommy Dunker | Robert Barth |
| 1998 | Gerd Riss | Bernd Diener | Matthias Kröger |
| 1999 | Robert Barth | Gerd Riss | Herbert Rudolph |
| 2000 | Bernd Diener | Robert Barth | Daniel Bacher |
| 2001 | Robert Barth | Gerd Riss | Stephan Katt |
| 2002 | Gerd Riss | Robert Barth | Daniel Bacher |
| 2003 | Robert Barth | Gerd Riss | Enrico Janoschka |
| 2004 | Gerd Riss | Herbert Rudolph | Stephan Katt |
| 2005 | Robert Barth | Enrico Janoschka | Bernd Diener |
| 2006 | Robert Barth | Bernd Diener | Stephan Katt |
| 2007 | Gerd Riss | Stephan Katt | Enrico Janoschka |
| 2008 | Sirg Schützbach | Gerd Riss | Bernd Diener |
| 2009 | Gerd Riss | Stephan Katt | Matthias Kröger |
| 2010 | Stephan Katt | Bernd Diener | Matthias Kröger |
| 2011 | Stephan Katt | Martin Smolinski | Matthias Kröger |
| 2012 | Martin Smolinski | Gerd Riss | Herbert Rudolph |
| 2013 | Martin Smolinski | Richard Speiser | Enrico Janoschka |
| 2014 | Erik Riss | Jörg Tebbe | Bernd Diener |
| 2015 | Jörg Tebbe | Bernd Diener | Stephan Katt |
| 2016 | Martin Smolinski | Stephan Katt | Bernd Diener |
| 2017 | Stephan Katt | Bernd Diener | Max Dilger |
| 2018 | Jörg Tebbe | Martin Smolinski | Andrew Appleton |
| 2019 | Michael Härtel | Max Dilger | Bernd Diener |
2020 cancelled due to COVID-19 pandemic
| 2021 | Max Dilger | Lukas Fienhage | Stephan Katt |
2022 cancelled due to bad weather
2023 cancelled due death of sidecar rider Peter Maurer

== See also ==
- Germany national speedway team
