= 2017 Team Long Track World Championship =

The 2017 Team Long Track World Championship was the 11th annual FIM Team Long Track World Championship. The final took place on 24 September 2017 in Roden, Drenthe, Netherlands.

== Results ==
- (Netherlands) Roden, Drenthe
- 24 September 2017

Pos.	Team	Pts	riders
1	Germany	61	Martin Smolinski 28, Michael Hartel 21, Lukas Fienhage 11, Stephan Katt 0
2	France	54	Dimitri Bergé 21, Mathieu Trésarrieu 18, Stephane Tresarrieu 15,
3	Netherlands	49	Romano Hummel 20, Theo Pijper 18, Dirk Fabriek 11
4	Czech Republic	43	Josef Franc 28, Martin Malek 8, Hynek Štichauer 7
5	Sweden	43	Sebastian Aldén 16, Robin Aspegren 13, Anders Mellgren 12, Andreas Bergstrom 2
6	Great Britain	36	James Shanes 23, Edward Kennett 7, Andrew Appleton 5, Richard Hall 1
7	Finland	28	Jesse Mustonen 17, Aki Pekka Mustonen 10, Aarni Heikkila 1

== See also ==
- 2017 Individual Long Track World Championship
- 2017 Speedway World Cup
