= 2024 FIM Long Track of Nations =

2024 Speedway event

The 2024 FIM Long Track of Nations was the 16th annual FIM Team Long Track World Championship. The final took place on 7 September 2024 in Morizès, France.

Germany won the event for a tenth time, while defending champions Netherlands finished last.

== Results ==
- (France) Morizès
- 7 September 2024

Pos.	Team	Pts	riders
1	Germany	68	Lukas Fienhage 29, Erik Riss 25, Max Dilger 14
2	France	53	Dimitri Bergé 27, Stéphane Trésarrieu 14, Jordan Dubernard 7, Mathias Trésarrieu 5
3	Great Britain	46	Chris Harris 26, Zach Wajtknecht 14, Andrew Appleton 6, Edward Kennett 0
4	Finland	46	Jesse Mustonen 20, Tero Aarnio 18, Henri Ahlbom 8
5	Denmark	34	Jacob Bukhave 14, Kenneth Hansen 13, Patrick Kruse 7
6	Czech Republic	34	Hynek Štichauer 22, Daniel Klíma 7, Jan Macek 5
7	Netherlands	31	Mika Meijer 13, Henry Van Der Steen 13, Rene Van Weele 5

== See also ==
- 2024 FIM Long Track World Championship
