= Bernd Diener =

German motorcycle speedway rider

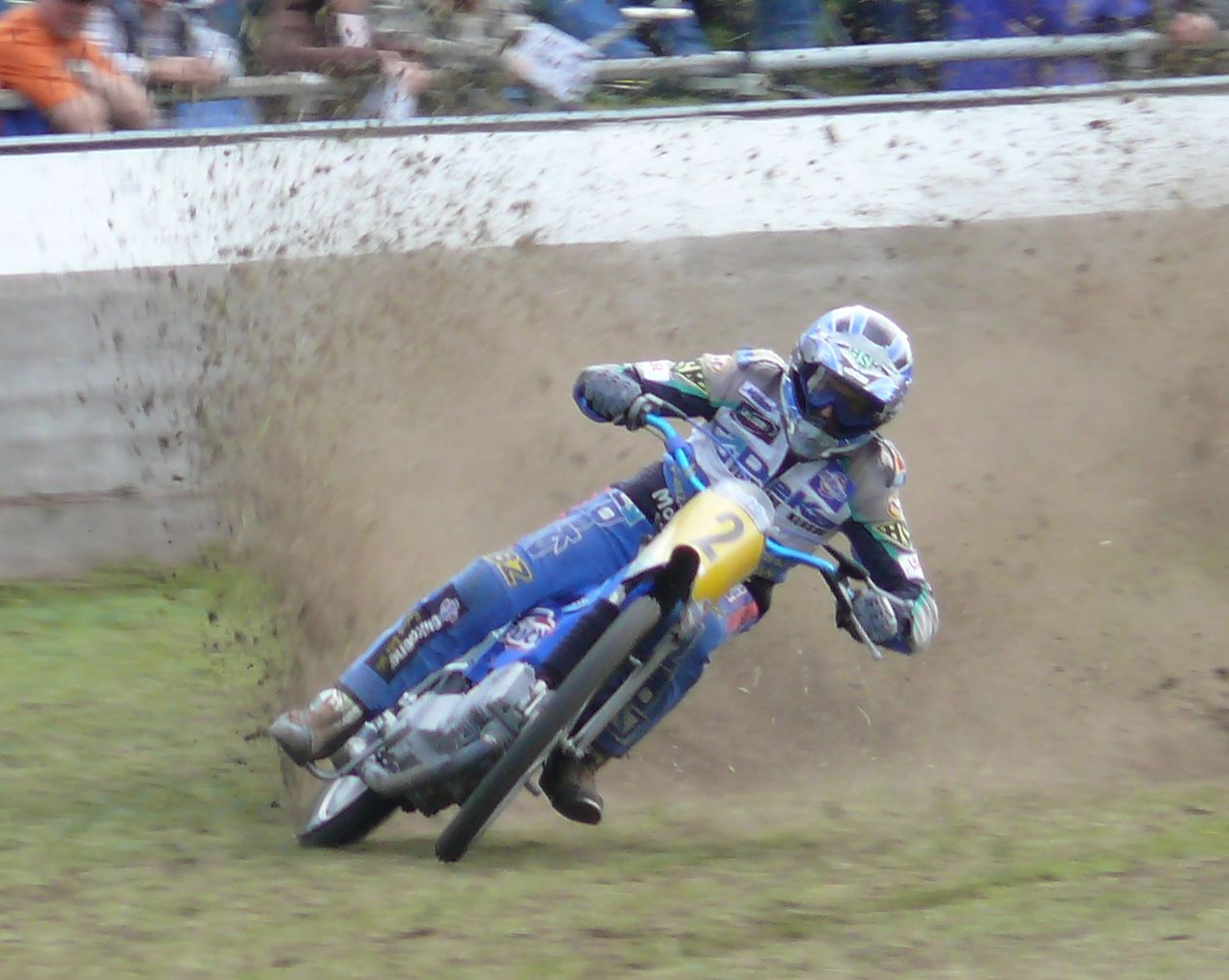
- Born: 19 June 1959 (age 67); Gengenbach, West Germany
- Nationality: German

Career history

Germany
- 1984, 2003–2006, 2009, 2012: Diedenbergen

Individual honours
- 1999: European Grasstrack Champion
- 2000: German Longtrack champion
- 1992, 1997, 1998, 2000, 2001, 2003, 2007, 2008, 2015: Northern German Longtrack champion

Team honours
- 2008, 2012: World Longtrack Team Champion

Bernd Diener (born 19 June 1959) is a former motorcycle speedway rider from Germany. He competed in Speedway, Longtrack and Grasstrack and is a two-time World longtrack team champion.

== Career ==
Diener has twice been on the podium in the World Longtrack Championship 1996 & 2004. He became a team World longtrack team champion in 2008 and 2012 respectively.

Diener won the European Grasstrack Championship in 1999.

Diener won the German national longtrack championship in 2000 and went on to finish fifth in the World Championship that year. Diener won the German championship silver medal three times and bronze medal seven times spanning the years 1995 to 2019.

Diener retired in 2023.

== World Longtrack Championship ==
=== One Day Finals ===
- 1986 (West Germany) Pfarrkirchen (7th) 10pts
- 1992 (Germany) Pfarrkirchen (16th) 2pts
- 1993 (Germany) Mühldorf (13th) 6pts
- 1994 (Czech Republic) Mariánské Lázně(6th) 15pts
- 1995 (Germany) Scheeßel(15th) 3pts
- 1996 (Germany) Herxheim (Runner-up) 23pts

=== Grand-Prix ===
- 1998 - 4 apps (12th) 38pts
- 1999 - 5 apps (7th) 56pts
- 2000 - 5 apps (5th) 60pts
- 2001 - 4 apps (7th) 45pts
- 2002 - 2 apps (16th) 24pts
- 2003 - 6 apps (7th) 58pts
- 2004 - 5 apps (Third) 71pts
- 2005 - 4 apps (13th) 27pts
- 2006 - 3 apps (14th) 18pts
- 2007 - 3 apps (9th) 34pts
- 2008 - did not compete
- 2009 - 4 apps (20th) 12pts
- 2010 - 1 app (24th) 3pts
- 2011 - did not compete
- 2012 - 4 apps (14th) 34pts
- 2013 - did not compete
- 2014 - 1 apps (20th) 5pts
- 2015 - did not compete
- 2016 - did not compete
- 2017 - did not compete
- 2018 - 5 apps (7th) 54pts

=== Best Grand-Prix Results ===
- (Finland) Forus Second 2012
- (Germany) Parchim Third 2001, 2002
- (France) Marmande Third 2004
- (Germany) Herxheim Third 2018

=== Team Championship ===
- 2008 (Germany) Wertle (First) 7/45pts (Rode with Gerd Riss, Stephan Katt, Matthias Kroger)
- 2012 (France) St. Macaire (First) 22/48 (Rode with Matthias Kroger, Jorg Tebbe, Stephan Katt)

== European Grasstrack Championship ==
=== Finals ===
- 1988 (West Germany) Nandlastadt (14th) 4pts
- 1994 (Germany) Cloppenburg (8th) 11pts
- 1995 (Netherlands) Joure (Second) 22pts
- 1999 (Germany) Werlte (Champion) 25pts
- 2000 (France) Saint-Colomb-de-Lauzun (4th) 15pts
- 2001 (Netherlands) Noordwolde (5th) 12pts
- 2005 (Germany) Schwarme (7th) 11pts
- 2006 (France) La Réole (5th) 18pts
- 2007 (England) Folkestone (8th) 9pts
- 2009 (Netherlands) Berghaupten (10th) 11pts
- 2015 (Netherlands) Staphorst (9th) 16pts
- 2017 (Germany) Hertingen (9th) 15pts
