= Richard Speiser =

German motorcycle racer (born 1987)

- Born: 3 May 1987 (age 39); Kempten, Germany
- Nationality: German

Individual honours
- 2013: German Longtrack GP
- 2008, 2013: Southern German Longtrack champion

Team honours
- 2009, 2010, 2011: World Longtrack Team Champion

Richard Speiser (born 3 May 1987) was a German motorcycle racer who competed in Grasstrack, Longtrack and Speedway.

== Career ==
During the 2013 FIM Long Track World Championship, Speiser won the German Grand Prix round at Vechta.

Speiser represented and helped Germany win three FIM Long Track of Nations in 2009, 2010 and 2011.

== World Longtrack Championship ==
=== Grand-Prix Years ===
- 2009 - 4 apps (9th) 67pts
- 2010 - 6 apps (Third) 103pts
- 2011 - 6 apps (Second) 103pts
- 2012 - Did not compete
- 2013 - 6 apps (7th) 81pts
- 2014 - 2 apps (12th) 16pts

=== Best Grand-Prix results ===
- (Germany) Vechta First 2013, Third 2010, 2011
- (Czech Republic) Mariánské Lázně Second 2011
- (Germany) Herxheim Third 2009

=== Team Championship ===
- 2009 (Netherlands) Eenrum (First) 0/47pts (Rode with Gerd Riss, Matthias Kröger, Enrico Janoschka)
- 2010 (France) Morizès (First) 14/49pts (Rode with Matthias Kröger, Stephan Katt, Martin Smolinski)
- 2011 (Germany) Scheeßel (First) 19/56pts (Rode with Stephan Katt, Jörg Tebbe, Martin Smolinski)
- 2013 (England) Folkestone (4th) 16/44pts (Rode with Stephan Katt, Jörg Tebbe, Enrico Janoschka)

== European Grasstrack Championship ==
- 2008 (Netherlands) Siddeburen (Second) 13pts
- 2009 Semi-finalist
- 2010 (France) La Réole (4th) 17pts
- 2011 (England) Thorpe St Peter (15th) 4pts
- 2012 Did not compete
- 2013 (Germany) Bielefeld (Third) 18pts
- 2014 (France) St. Macaire (17th) 3pts
