= James Shanes =

British motorcycle racer

- Born: 17 March 1997 (age 29); Dorchester, England
- Nationality: British (English)
- Website: www.smiley-racing.com

Career history
- 2013: Coventry Storm
- 2014: Devon Demons
- 2015–2016: Kent Kings
- 2017–2018: Poole Pirates
- 2018: Sheffield Tigers
- 2018–2022: Birmingham Brummies
- 2019: Swindon Robins

Individual honours
- 2016, 2017: European Grasstrack Champion
- 2015, 2016, 2017, 2019: British Masters Grasstrack Champion
- 2015: British SandAce Championship
- 2014: British U21 Grasstrack champion

Team honours
- 2015: World Longtrack Team Champion
- 2018: World Longtrack Team silver

James Shanes (born 17 March 1997) is a British speedway rider and also competes in Grasstrack and Longtrack speedway. He is a four-time British Masters Grasstrack Champion, two-time European Grasstrack Champion and was a world long track competitor.

== Longtrack ==
In 2015, Shanes was part of the British team with Richard Hall, Glen Phillips and Andrew Appleton that won the world championship gold medal at the 2015 Team Long Track World Championship.

World Championship Grand-Prix Series

Year	GP	Points	Pos	GP Wins	GP Podiums
2017	5	78	4	1	1
2018	5	71	5	0	1
2019	5	34	10	0	0
2020	2	18	10	0	0

Best Results

- (Netherlands) Eenrum First 2017, Third 2018.
- (France) La Réole Third 2017

World Championship Team Championship

- 2015 - (Germany) Mühldorf (with Andrew Appleton, Richard Hall & Glen Phillips) First
- 2016 - (Czech Republic) Mariánské Lázně (with Andrew Appleton, Richard Hall & Glen Phillips) Fourth
- 2017 - (Netherlands) Roden 23/36 (with Andrew Appleton, Richard Hall & Edward Kennett) Sixth
- 2018 - (France) Morizès 5/46pts (with Adam Ellis, Zach Wajtknecht & Chris Harris) Second

== Grasstrack ==
Shanes began racing in 2003, aged six years, on a 50cc automatic. He progressed through the youth classes with some success, including British Championship wins in 2010 and 2011. He upgraded to adult 250cc racing on his 15th birthday and finished third place in the 250cc British Championship that year.

Shanes is the first rider to complete a hat-trick of British Masters Grasstrack titles as well as being the youngest to win back to back titles. He is also the youngest European Champion.

European Championship

- 2015 (Netherlands) Staphorst (Second) 18pts
- 2016 (England) Folkestone (Champion) 9pts
- 2017 (Germany) Hertingen (Champion) 20pts
- 2018 (France) Tayac (Fourth) 15pts

British Masters

- 2014 (England) Folkestone (4th)
- 2015 (England) Wimborne (Champion)
- 2016 (England) Bristol (Champion)
- 2017 (England) Folkestone (Champion)
- 2018 (England) Gawsworth (Second)

== Speedway ==
In 2017, Shanes signed for Poole Pirates.

In 2023, Shanes signed for Redcar Bears for the SGB Championship 2023, but because of complications over an arm injury, he was unable to compete for the Bears.

All figures relate to the League Racing.

Year	Team	Matches	Rides	Points	Bonus	Total	Average	Full Maximum	Paid Maximum
2014	Plymouth Devils	3	10	3	2	5	2.00		
2016	Somerset Rebels	5	21	14	2	16	3.05		
2017	Poole Pirates	32	115	93	26	119	4.14		1
2018	Sheffield Tigers	28	142	171	32	203	5.72		
2018	Poole Pirates	5	17	11	3	14	3.29		
2019	Birmingham Brummies	18	90	122	21	143	6.36		
2020	Swindon Robins	7	24	8	4	12	2.00		
