= Josef Franc =

Czech motorcycle racer (born 1979)

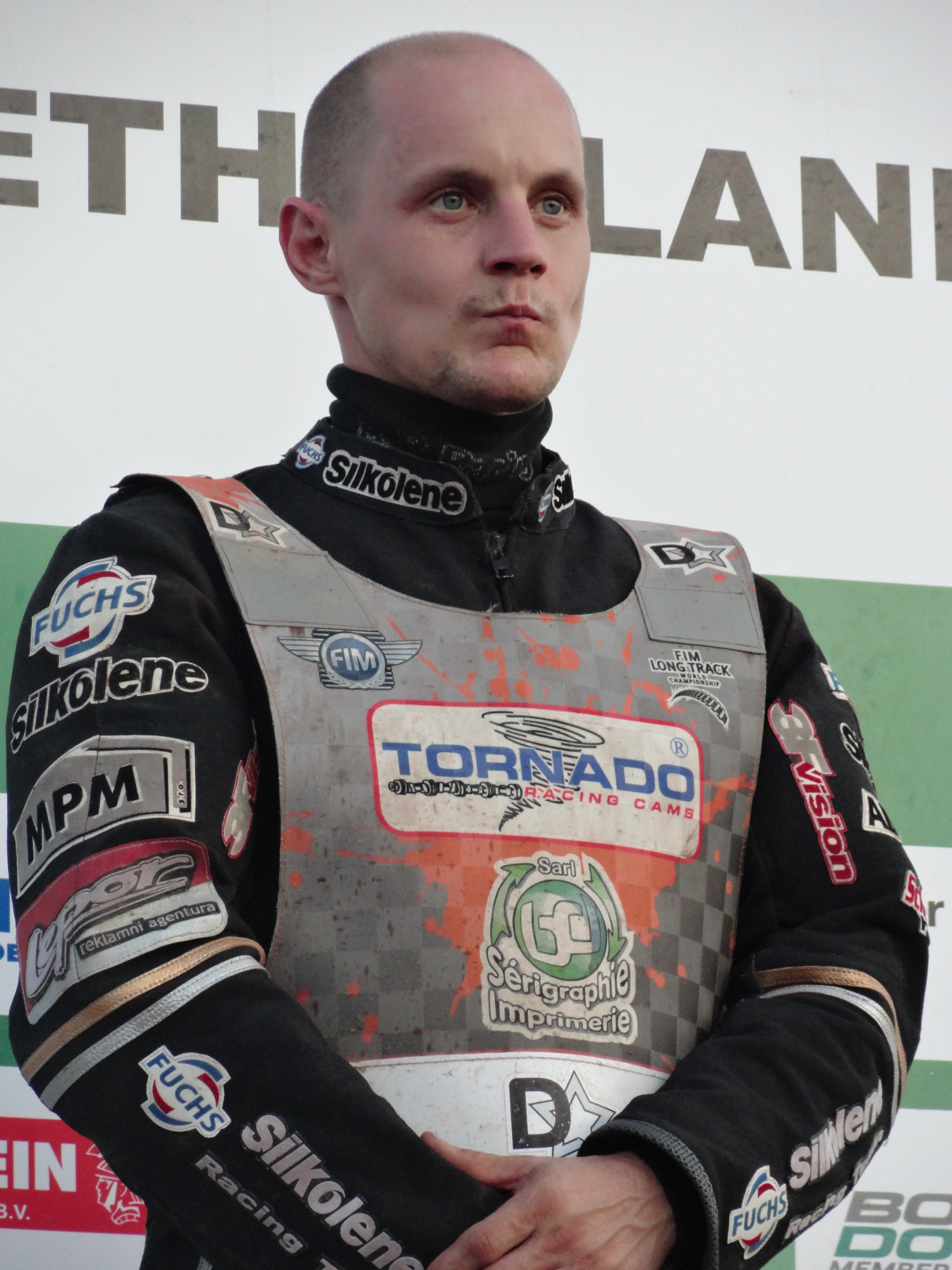
- Franc in 2012
- Born: 18 January 1979 (age 47); Čáslav, Czechoslovakia
- Nickname: Pepe
- Nationality: Czech

Career history

Czech Republic
- 2005-2009, 2011, 2013-2018: Olymp Praha

Poland
- 2000: Lublin
- 2002, 2009-2011, 2018: Krosno
- 2007: Praha
- 2013: Kraków
- 2014: Daugavpils
- 2021: Wittstock

Great Britain
- 2001, 2003-2004, 2009, 2011: Berwick Bandits
- 2005-2008: Newcastle Diamonds
- 2006: Belle Vue Aces
- 2010: Sheffield Tigers
- 2014: Plymouth Devils

Sweden
- 2005: Eldarna

Denmark
- 2015: Holsted

Individual honours
- 2017, 2018: Czech Republic champion
- 1999: Czech Republic Under-21 Speedway Champion
- 2013, 2014, 2015, 2017, 2018: Czech Longtrack Championship
- 2010: Scottish Open Champion

Team honours
- 2022: World Longtrack Team silver
- 2019: World Longtrack Team bronze
- 1998, 2003: Czech Republic Div One Champion

Josef Franc (born 18 January 1979) is a Czech former international motorcycle racer who competed in Grasstrack, Longtrack and motorcycle speedway. He earned eight international caps for the Czech Republic national speedway team.

== Career ==
In 2001, Franc joined Berwick Bandits along with fellow Czechs Michal Makovský and Adrian Rymel.

Franc has appeared as a wildcard in the 2003 Speedway Grand Prix of Czech Republic and as a track reserve in the 2007 Czech Republic Speedway Grand Prix, scoring three points from two rides and has represented the Czech Republic national speedway team at senior level.

Franc was the Czech Republic Under-21 Champion in 1999 and was the Czech Republic national champion in 2017 and 2018.

In 2019, Franc was part of the Czech team, along with Hynek Štichauer and Martin Málek, that won the bronze medal at the 2019 Team Long Track World Championship.

In 2022, Franc was part of the Czech team, again with Málek and Štichauer, that won the silver medal at the 2022 Team Long Track World Championship.

== Speedway Grand Prix results ==
- 2003, Prague SGP, 0 Points.
- 2007, Prague SGP, 3 Points.
- 2012, Prague SGP, 9 Points.

== Career details ==
=== World Championships ===
- Individual World Championship and Speedway Grand Prix
  - 2003 - 45th place (1 pt in one event)
  - 2007 - 28th place (3 pts in one event)
- Team World Championship (Speedway World Team Cup and Speedway World Cup)
  - 2003 - 6th place (started in Event 1 only)
  - 2004 - 6th place
  - 2006 - 8th place
  - 2007 - 2nd place in Qualifying round 2
- Individual U-21 World Championship
  - 1999 - (Denmark) Vojens - did not start as track reserve
  - 2000 - (Poland) Gorzów Wlkp. - 6th place (8 pts)

=== European Championships ===
- Individual European Championship
  - 2002 - (Poland) Rybnik - 14th place (5 pts)
  - 2003 - (Czech Republic) Slaný - did not start as track reserve
  - 2007 - 13th place in Qualifying Round 3
  - 2008 - (Slovenia) Lendava - 6th place (10 pts)
- Individual U-19 European Championship
  - 1998 - (Slovenia) Krško - 8th place (8 pts)
- European Club Champions' Cup
  - 2004 - (Slovenia) Ljubljana - 4th place (10 pts)

== World Longtrack Championship ==
Grand-Prix Years

- 1999 1 app (23rd) 4pts
- 2010 1 app (18th) 19pts
- 2011 6 app (13th) 51pts
- 2012 6 app (Third) 126pts
- 2013 6 app (4th) 91pts
- 2014 4 app (10th) 32pts
- 2015 4 app (5th) 53pts
- 2016 5 app (7th) 55pts
- 2017 5 app (Third) 86pts

Best Grand-Prix Results

- (Netherlands) Eenrum Second 2017
- (Finland) Forssa Second 2012
- (Netherlands) Groningen First 2012
- (France) Marmande Second 2012
- (France) Morizès First 2012, Second 2017
- (Poland) Rzeszów Third 2013

Team Championship

- 2010 (Germany) Morizès (6th) 9/25pts (Rode with Zdeněk Schneiderwind, Richard Wolff, Pavel Ondrasik).
- 2011 (Germany) Scheeßel (4th) 21/36pts (Rode with Aleš Dryml Jr., Richard Wolff, Pavel Ondrasik).
- 2012 (France) St. Macaire (5th) 16/30 (Rode with Aleš Dryml Jr., Richard Wolff, Michael Hádek).
- 2013 (England) Folkestone (7th) 11/23pts (Rode with Richard Wolff, Karel Kadlec).
- 2014 (Finland) Forssa (6th) 13/23pts (Rode with Richard Wolff, Jan Klatovský).
- 2015 (Germany) Mühldorf (6th) 18/30pts (Rode with Richard Wolff, Michal Dudek, Michal Škurla).
- 2016 (Czech Republic) Mariánské Lázně (Third) 18/42pts (Rode with Hynek Stichauer, Martin Málek).
- 2017 (Netherlands) Roden (4th) 28/43pts (Rode with Hynek Stichauer, Martin Málek).
- 2018 (France) Morizès (5th) 20/32pts (rode with Martin Malák, Michal Škurla).

== European Grasstrack Championship ==
Finalist

- 1999 (Germany) Werlte (16th) 1pt
- 2011 (England) Thorpe St Peter (17th) 4pts
- 2012 (Netherlands) Eenrum (Reserve N/S)
- 2013 (Germany) Bielefeld (9th) 13pts
- 2014 (France) Saint-Macaire (4th) 13pts
- 2015 (Netherlands) Staphorst (20th) 0pts
- 2016 (England) Folkestone (4th) 12pts
- 2017 (Germany) Hertingen (7th) 10pts
- 2018 (France) Tayac (Second) 15pts

== Czech Longtrack Championship ==
- 2003 (Czech Republic) Mariánské Lázně 12th
- 2010 (Czech Republic) Mariánské Lázně, Second
- 2011 (Czech Republic) Mariánské Lázně, Second
- 2012 (Czech Republic) Mariánské Lázně, Second
- 2013 (Czech Republic) Mariánské Lázně, First
- 2014 (Czech Republic) Mariánské Lázně, First
- 2015 (Czech Republic) Mariánské Lázně, First
- 2017 (Czech Republic) Mariánské Lázně, First
- 2018 (Czech Republic) Mariánské Lázně, First

== See also ==
- Czech Republic national speedway team
- List of Speedway Grand Prix riders
