= Dirk Fabriek =

Dutch motorcycle racer

- Born: 2 April 1985 (age 41); Ter Apel, Netherlands
- Nationality: Dutch

Individual honours
- 2008, 2009, 2010: Dutch Grasstrack Champion

Team honours
- 2013, 2016: World Longtrack Team Champion

Dirk Fabriek (born 2 April 1985) is a Dutch motorcycle racer who competes in longtrack and Grasstrack.

== Career ==
Fabriek represented the Netherlands national long track team in the World Longtrack Championship from 2007 to 2017 and twice won the World championship titles at the 2013 Team Long Track World Championship in Folkestone, England and 2016 Team Long Track World Championship in Mariánské Lázně in the Czech Republic. In addition, he won four silver medals in 2008, 2009, 2011 and 2014.

Fabriek retired after the 2017 season.

== Results ==
=== World Longtrack Championship ===
==== Grand-Prix Years ====
- 2004 - 4 apps (21st) 10pts
- 2005 - 1 apps (25th) 1pt
- 2007 - 3 apps (10th) 32pts
- 2008 - 4 apps (Third) 65pts
- 2009 - 5 apps (Third) 81pts
- 2010 - 6 apps (15th) 46pts
- 2011 - 6 apps (10th) 59pts
- 2013 - 6 apps (10th) 75pts
- 2014 - 4 apps (8th) 40pts
- 2015 - 4 apps (16th) 21pts
- 2016 - 1 apps (16th) 16pts
- 2017 - 5 apps (11th) 32pts

==== Best Grand-Prix Results ====
- (Germany) Mariánské Lázně Second 2009
- (France) Marmande Third 2009
- (France) Saint-Macaire First 2008

=== World Team Championship ===
- 2007 (France) Morizès (5th) 32pts (Rode with Jannick de Jong, Theo Pijper, Erik Eijbergen)
- 2008 (Germany) Werlte (Second) 45pts (Rode with Jannick de Jong, Erik Eijbergen, Mark Stiekema)
- 2009 (Netherlands) Eenrum (Second) 46pts (Rode with Jannick de Jong, Theo Pijper, Mark Stiekema)
- 2010 (France) Morizès (Second) 42pts (Rode with Theo Pijper, Mark Stiekema, Sjoerd Rozenberg)
- 2011 Did not compete
- 2012 Did not compete
- 2013 (England) Folkestone (First) 65pts (Rode with Jannick de Jong, Theo Pijper, Mark Stiekema))
- 2014 (Finland) Forssa (Second) 41pts (Rode with Jannick de Jong, Theo Pijper, Henry van der Steen)
- 2015 Did not compete
- 2016 (Czech Republic) Mariánské Lázně (First) 46pts (Rode with Jannick de Jong, Theo Pijper, Romano Hummel)
- 2017 (Netherlands) Roden (Third) 49pts (Rode with Theo Pijper, Romano Hummel)

=== European Grasstrack Championship ===
- 2004 (Netherlands) Eenrum (11th) 12pts
- 2005 (Germany) Schwarme (Second) 16pts
- 2006 (France) La Réole (Third) 14pts
- 2007 (England) Folkestone (5th) 14pts
- 2008 (Netherlands) Siddeburen (6th) 17pts
- 2009 (Germany) Berghaupten (8th) 12pts
- 2010 (France) La Réole (7th) 11pts
- 2012 (Netherlands) Eenrum (Second) 16pts
- 2013 (Germany) Bielefeld (Second) 11pts
- 2014 (France) Saint-Macaire (6th) 13pts
- 2016 (England) Folkestone (5th) 17pts

=== Dutch Grasstrack Championship ===
- 2002 (15th)
- 2003 (14th)
- 2004 (6th)
- 2005 (4th)
- 2006 (Second)
- 2007 (5th)
- 2008 (Champion)
- 2009 (Champion)
- 2010 (Champion)
- 2011 (Second)
- 2012 (13th)
- 2013 (Second)
- 2014 (Third)
