= Matthias Kröger =

German motorcycle speedway rider (born 1969)

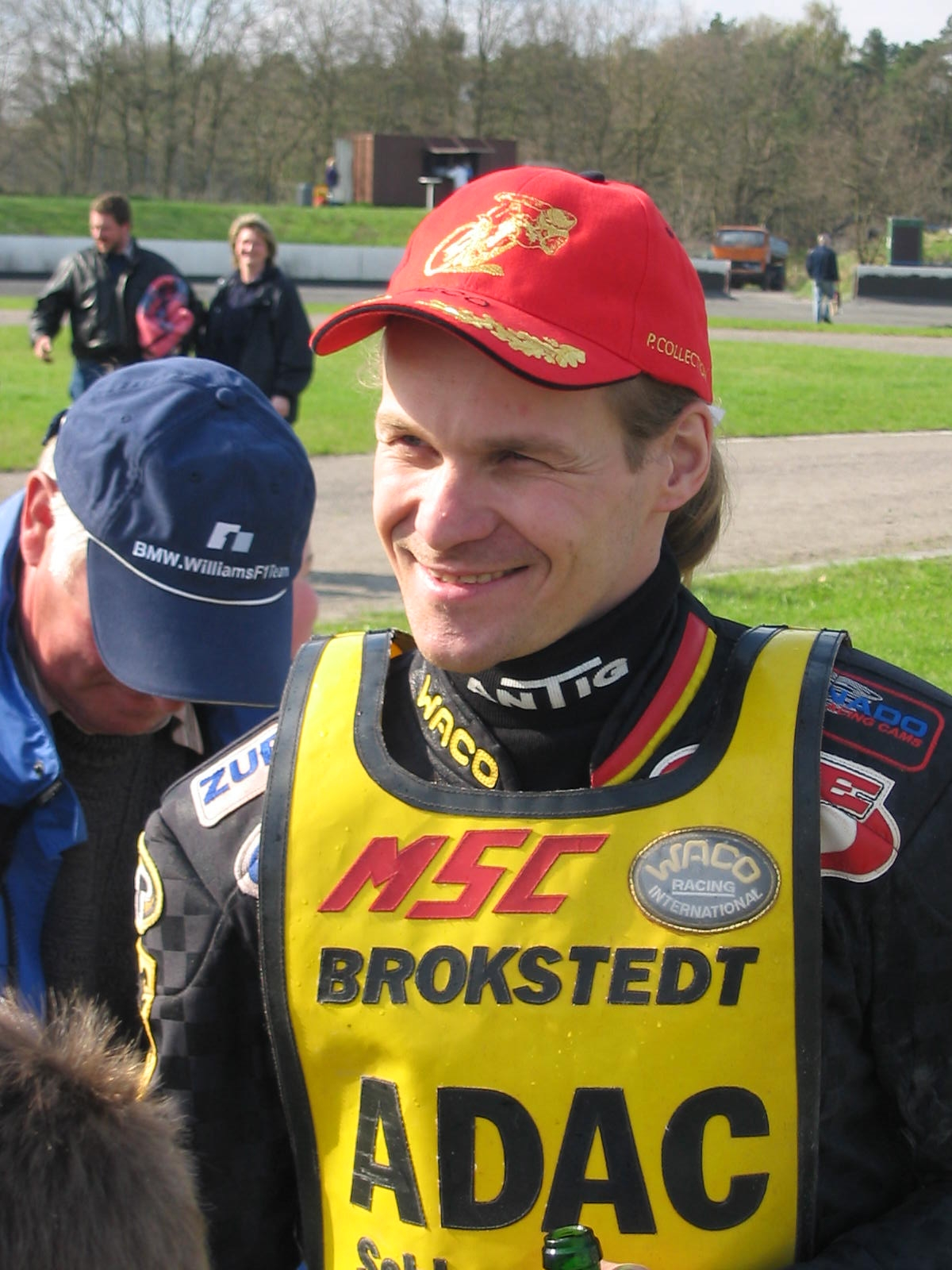
- Born: 24 May 1969 (age 57); Schleswig, Germany
- Nationality: German

Career history

West Germany
- 1988-2011: Brokstedt

Denmark
- 1998, 2009: Outrup
- 2000-2001: Holsted
- 2002-2004: Kronjylland
- 2006: Brovst
- 2008: Esbjerg

Sweden
- 2000: Vetlanda

Poland
- 2006-2008: Łódź

Great Britain
- 2008: Somerset

Team honours
- 2007, 2008, 2009, 2010, 2012: World Long Track Team Champion

Matthias Kröger (born 24 May 1969) is a former speedway, long track and grasstrack rider from Germany. He earned 6 international caps for the German national speedway team.

== Career ==
Kröger rode in 2002 Speedway World Cup and is a five-time World Team Champion.

In 2008, Kröger made his British league debut riding for the Somerset Rebels in the 2008 Premier League speedway season.

== Results ==
=== World Longtrack Championship ===
Grand-Prix Years

- 1997 5 app (8th) 62pts
- 1998 5 app (6th) 57pts
- 1999 5 app (9th) 50pts
- 2001 5 app (Third) 90pts
- 2001 1 app (18th) 10pts
- 2002 5 app (4th) 77pts
- 2003 6 app (4th) 82pts
- 2004 3 app (10th) 42pts
- 2005 4 app (6th) 42pts
- 2006 2 app (10th) 23pts
- 2007 3 app (13th) 21pts
- 2008 4 app (6th) 48pts
- 2009 5 app (4th) 79pts
- 2010 6 app (8th) 75pts
- 2011 6 app (8th) 73pts
- 2012 6 app (7th) 86pts
- 2013 6 app (17th) 37pts
- 2014 2 app (19th) 8pts
- 2016 5 app (12th) 29pts

Best Grand-Prix Results

- (Germany) Bielefeld Second 2004
- (Germany) Cloppenburg Second 1997
- (Germany) Harsewinkel Second 2000
- (Germany) Jübek Second 2000
- (Czech Republic) Mariánské Lázně Third 2009
- (France) Marmande Second 2006
- (France) Morizès Third 2000, 2002, 2003
- (New Zealand) New Plymouth Third 2004
- (Norway) Forus Third 2012

=== Team Championship ===
- 2007 (France) Morizès (Champion) 9/51pts (Rode with Gerd Riss, Stephan Katt, Enrico Janoschka)
- 2008 (Germany) Werlte (Champion) 12/55pts (Rode with Gerd Riss, Stephan Katt, Bernd Diener)
- 2009 (Netherlands) Eenrum (Champion) 16/47pts (Rode with Gerd Riss, Richard Speiser, Enrico Janoschka)
- 2010 (France) Morizès (Champion) 8/49pts (Rode with Stephan Katt, Richard Speiser, Martin Smolinski)
- 2012 (France) St Macaire (Champion) 8/49pts (Rode with Stephan Katt, Jörg Tebbe, Bernd Diener)

=== European Grasstrack Championship ===
- 1989 Semi-final
- 1995 (Netherlands) Joure (6th) 13pts
- 1996 (France) St. Colomb de Lauzun (Non-Starter)
- 2002 (Germany) Berghaupten (7th) 9pts
- 2003 (France) La Reole (Third) 16pts
- 2004 Semi-final
- 2005 (Germany) Schwarme (4th) 12pts
- 2006 (France) La Réole (4th) 16pts
- 2007 (England) Folkestone (6th) 15pts
- 2009 (Germany) Berghaupten (4th) 15pts
- 2010 (France) La Réole (14th) 6pts
- 2012 (Netherlands) Eenrum (9th) 9pts
- 2013 (Germany) Bielefeld (7th) 14pts
- 2014 (France) St. Macaire (Non-Starter)
