= Michael Härtel =

German speedway, grasstrack and longtrack rider

- Born: 25 January 1998 (age 28); Landshut, Germany
- Nationality: German
- Website: michael-haertel.de

Career history

Germany
- 2022: Olching
- 2023: Güstrow

Great Britain
- 2018: Ipswich Witches
- 2020: King's Lynn Stars

Individual honours
- 2019: German longtrack champion

Team honours
- 2023: Bundesliga title

Michael Härtel (born 25 January 1998) is a German motorcycle rider. He competes in speedway, grasstrack and longtrack. He finished runner-up in the 2017 Longtrack World Championship.

== Career ==
Härtel was born in Landshut, Germany and was the German Under 21 Champion on three occasions, in 2013, 2014 and 2015. He also started his longtrack career in 2015, competing in the World Longtrack Championship. In his first appearance, he came third and his second saw his win a Vechta.

In 2017, Härtel became a full competitor in the championship and took second overall. During the campaign, he was third at Herxheim am Berg and Morizès, runner-up at La Réole and winner at Mühldorf. Also during 2017, he represented the German Under 21 team and has helped them to the 2017 European Championship finals in Poland. In 2018, he rode for Ipswich Witches but missed the second part of the season after breaking his arm riding longtrack.

In 2020, Härtel was brought back into the British leagues by King's Lynn Stars.

In 2023, Härtel helped MC Güstrow win the Budesliga title.

== Results ==
- 2014 N/S Reserve
- 2015 - 2 apps (9th) 36pts
- 2016 - 1 apps (18th) 7pts
- 2017 - 5 apps (Runner-up) 101pts

=== Best Grand-Prix Results ===
- (Germany) Herxheim am Berg Third 2015 & 2017
- (France) La Réole Second 2017
- (France) Morizès Third 2017
- (Germany) Mühldorf First 2017
- (Germany) Vechta First 2015

=== Team Championship ===
- 2015 (Germany) Mühldorf (Runners-up) 44pts (Rode with Jorg Tebbe, Stephan Katt, Erik Riss)
- 2016 (Czech Republic) Mariánské Lázně (Runners-up) 44pts (Rode with Martin Smolinski, Jorg Tebbe, Stephan Katt)
