= Jannick de Jong =

Dutch motorcycle racer

- Born: 7 June 1987 (age 39); Drachten, Netherlands
- Nationality: Dutch

Individual honours
- 2015: Long Track World Champion
- 2013, 2014, 2015: European Grasstrack Champion
- 2004, 2006, 2007, 2011, 2013, 2014, 2015, 2016: Dutch Grasstrack Champion
- 2004, 2006, 2007, 2008, 2009, 2011: Dutch Speedway Champion

Team honours
- 2013, 2016, 2023: World Longtrack Team champion

Jannick de Jong (born 7 June 1987) is a Dutch former motorcycle racer. Hecompeted primarily in longtrack and grasstrack. He was the 2015 world champion in longtrack.

== Career ==
De Jong represented the Netherlands national long track team in the World Longtrack Championship from 2007 to 2023 and on three occasions has won the World championship titles at the 2013 Team Long Track World Championship in Folkestone, England, 2016 Team Long Track World Championship in Mariánské Lázně in the Czech Republic and in 2023, when he was part of the Netherlands team, along with Romano Hummel, Dave Meijerink and Mika Meijer, that won the 2023 Team Long Track World Championship.

The highlight of de Jong's career was becoming the Long Track World Champion in 2015. In addition, he has won the European Grasstrack Champion three times in 2013, 2014 and 2015.

== Major results ==
=== World Longtrack Championship ===
==== Grand-Prix ====
- 2005 - 4 apps (12th) 31pts
- 2006 - 2 apps (17th) 10pts
- 2007 - 3 apps (11th) 28pts
- 2008 - 4 apps (9th) 33pts
- 2009 - 4 apps (10th) 42pts
- 2010 - 6 apps (9th) 70pts
- 2011 - 0 apps
- 2012 - 6 apps (9th) 74pts
- 2013 - 6 apps (Second) 97pts
- 2014 - 4 apps (Second) 72pts
- 2015 - 4 apps (First) 75pts
- 2016 - 5 apps (Second) 101pts
- 2017 - 1 apps (15th) 24pts
- 2022 - 1 apps (19th) 10pts

==== Best Grand-Prix Results ====
- (Netherlands) Eenrum Second 2016, Third 2013
- (Finland) Forssa First 2016, Third 2013
- (Germany) Herxheim am Berg First 2014, 2017
- (France) Marmande First 2014, Second 2010, 2013
- (France) Morizès First 2015
- (Germany) Mühldorf Third 2016
- (Germany) Vechta Second 2016

=== World Team Championship ===
- 2007 (France) Morizès (5th) 32pts (Rode with Dirk Fabriek, Theo Pijper, Erik Eijbergen)
- 2008 (Germany) Werlte (Second) 45pts (Rode with Dirk Fabriek, Erik Eijbergen, Mark Stiekema)
- 2009 (Netherlands) Eenrum (Second) 46pts (Rode with Dirk Fabriek, Theo Pijper, Mark Stiekema)
- 2011 (Germany) Scheeßel (Second) 38pts (Rode with Sjoerd Rozenberg, Mark Stiekema, Jeffrey Woortman)
- 2013 (England) Folkestone (First) 65pts (Rode with Dirk Fabriek, Theo Pijper, Mark Stiekema))
- 2014 (Finland) Forssa (Second) 41pts (Rode with Dirk Fabriek, Theo Pijper, Henry van der Steen)
- 2015 (Germany) Mühldorf (Fifth) 31pts (Rode with Henry van der Steen & Sjoerd Rozenberg)
- 2016 (Czech Republic) Mariánské Lázně (First) 46pts (Rode with Theo Pijper, Dirk Fabriek, Romano Hummel)
- 2023 (Netherlands) Roden (First) 64pts (Rode with Dave Meijerink, Mika Meijer, Romano Hummel)

=== Grasstrack European Championship ===
- 2004 (Netherlands) Eenrum (10th) 11pts
- 2005 (Germany) Schwarme (17th) 4pts
- 2006 (France) La Réole (9th) 10pts
- 2007 (England) Folkestone (7th) 11pts
- 2008 (Netherlands) Siddeburen (11th) 8pts
- 2009 (Germany) Berghaupten (7th) 14pts
- 2010 (France) La Réole (5th) 12pts
- 2011 (England) Skegness (Second) 10pts
- 2012 (Netherlands) Eenrum (Third) 16pts
- 2013 (Germany) Bielefeld (Champion) 19pts
- 2014 (France) Saint-Macaire (Champion) 20pts
- 2015 (Netherlands) Staphorst (Champion) 19pts
- 2016 (England) Folkestone (6th) 17pts

=== Dutch Grasstrack Championship ===
- 2003 (Third)
- 2004 (Champion)
- 2005 (8th)
- 2006 (Champion)
- 2007 (Champion)
- 2008 (Third)
- 2009 (6th)
- 2010 (Third)
- 2011 (Champion)
- 2012 (Second)
- 2013 (Champion)
- 2014 (Champion)
- 2015 (Champion)
- 2016 (Champion)
