= Rhodes Minnis =

Village in Kent, England

Coordinates: 51.1461°N 1.0739°E

- Location within Kent
- District: Folkestone and Hythe
- Shire county: Kent
- Region: South East
- Country: England
- Sovereign state: United Kingdom
- Post town: Canterbury
- Postcode district: CT4
- Police: Kent
- Fire: Kent
- Ambulance: South East Coast
- UK Parliament: Folkestone and Hythe

Rhodes Minnis is a village near Folkestone in Kent, England, located between Lyminge and Stelling Minnis. It is on the boundary of the civil parishes of Lyminge and Elham. It was a gathering place for some of the Swing Riots organizers from Lyminge during the 1830s.
