= Czech Republic national long track team =

Czech Republic racing team

Czech Republic
- Association: Autoklub of the Czech Republic; Autoklub České republiky
- FIM code: ACCR
- Team manager: Milan Špinka
- Nation Colour: Red, white and blue

World Championship
Team	—	1	2
Best result	4th placed (2007)
Individual	—	—	—

The Czech Republic national long track team is the national long track motorcycle racing team of the Czech Republic and is controlled by the Autoklub of the Czech Republic (ACCR). The team was started in all editions of Team Long Track World Championship, but they never won a championship medal.

== Competition ==
Team Long Track World Championship
Year & venue	Pts.	Riders	
2007 Morizès	4	44	Zdeněk Schneiderwind (23), Pavel Ondrašík (15), Richard Wolff (6), Karel Kadlec (—)
2008 Werlte	5	36	Richard Wolff (22), Pavel Ondrašík (13), Karel Kadlec (1), Zdeněk Schneiderwind (0)
2009 Eenrum	5	35	Zdeněk Schneiderwind (17), Richard Wolff (13), Pavel Ondrašík (5), Marek Čejka (—)
2010 Morizès			

=== Riders ===
Riders who started in Team Long Track World Championship Finals:

- Marek Čejka (2009)
- Karel Kadlec (2007, 2008)
- Pavel Ondrašík (2007, 2008, 2009)
- Zdeněk Schneiderwind (2007, 2008, 2009)
- Richard Wolff (2007, 2008, 2009)

== See also ==
- Czech Republic national speedway team
