= Glen Phillips (speedway rider) =

British speedway rider

- Born: 22 November 1982 (age 43); Farnborough, England
- Nationality: British (English)

Career history
- 1999–2001, 2003–2005, 2007–2008: Isle of Wight
- 2000, 2006: Somerset
- 2002: Reading
- 2009: Stoke

Individual honours
- 2007: British Masters Grasstrack Champion

Team honours
- 2007: Premier League Fours Winner
- 2003: Premier League KO Cup Winner
- 2001: Young Shield Winner
- 2015: World Longtrack Team Champion

Glen Alan Phillips (born 22 November 1982) in Farnborough, Kent, is a former motorcycle speedway rider from England.

== Career ==
Phillips represented the Great Britain national speedway team at Under-21 level. His primary club while riding in the British speedway leagues was the Isle of Wight Islanders. He was part of the Isle of Wight four who won the Premier League Four-Team Championship, held on 8 July 2007, at the East of England Arena.

In 2015, Phillips was part of the British team with Richard Hall, Andrew Appleton and James Shanes that won the world championship gold medal at the 2015 Team Long Track World Championship. It was the first time that Britain had won the event.

== Major results ==
=== World Longtrack Championship ===
Grand-Prix Years

- 2003 - Reserve (Non-Starter)
- 2004 - Four G.P. 22pts (17th)
- 2006 - Three G.P. 33pts (7th)
- 2007 - Three G.P. 11pts (17th)
- 2008 - Four G.P. 66pts (Second)
- 2009 - Five G.P. 76pts (5th)
- 2010 - Six G.P. 62pts (10th)
- 2011 - Six G.P. 53pts (12th)
- 2012 - Six G.P. 70pts (10th)
- 2013 - Six G.P. 46pts (16th)
- 2014 - One G.P. 10pts (18th)
- 2015 - Four G.P. 29pts (11th)
- 2016 - five G.P. 46pts (8th)

Best G.P. Results

First

- 2009 - (France) Morizes

Second

- 2008 - (France) Morizes

Third

- 2008 - (Czech Republic) Marianske Lanze
- 2008 - (Germany) Vechta

=== World Longtrack Team Championship ===
- 2007 - (France) Morizes (with Paul Hurry, Andrew Appleton & Mitch Godden) Second
- 2008 - (Germany) Werlte (with Richard Hall, Mitch Godden & Vince Kinchin) Third
- 2009 - (Netherlands) Eenrum (with Paul Hurry, Andrew Appleton & Richard Hall) Fourth
- 2010 - (France) Morizes (with Andrew Appleton, Richard Hall & Chris Mills) Fourth
- 2011 - (Germany) Scheeßel (with Paul Cooper, Andrew Appleton & Mitch Godden) Third
- 2012 - (France) St. Macaire (with Paul Cooper, Richard Hall & David Howe) Second
- 2013 - (England) Folkestone (with Richard Hall, Andrew Appleton & Paul Cooper) Third
- 2014 - (Finland) Forssa (with Andrew Appleton, Richard Hall & David Howe) Fifth
- 2015 - (Germany) Muhldorf (with Andrew Appleton, Richard Hall & James Shanes) First
- 2016 - (Czech Republic) Mariánské Lázně (with Andrew Appleton, Richard Hall & James Shanes) 4th

=== European Grasstrack Championship ===
Finalist

- 2005 - (Germany) Schwarme 12pts (5th)
- 2006 - (France) La Reole 11pts (7th)
- 2007 - (England) Folkestone 15pts (4th)
- 2008 - (Netherlands) Siddeburen 15pts (5th)
- 2009 - (Germany) Berghaupten 17pts (Third)
- 2010 - (France) La Reole (Reserve Non-Starter)
- 2011 - (England) Skegness 10pts (4th)
- 2012 - (Netherlands) Eenrum 15pts (5th)
- 2013 - (Germany) Bielefeld 1pt (17th) Reserve
- 2014 - (France) St. Macaire (Reserve Non-Starter)

Best Other Results

Semi-final

Second

- 2006 - (England) Folkestone
- 2007 - (Germany) Hertingan

Third

- 2012 - (France) Artigues de Lussac

== British Grasstrack Championship ==
Masters

First

- 2007 - (England) @ Long Marston

Second

- 2011 - (England) @ Rhodes Minnis

Third

- 2008 - (England) @ Rhodes Minnis
- 2012 - (England) @ Frittenden

Other Top Ten Finishes

- 2000 - (England) @ Folkestone
- 2002 - (England) @ Skegness
- 2005 - (England) @ Northiam
- 2006 - (England) @ Wadebridge
- 2013 - (England) @ Wimborne
- 2015 - (England) @ Wimborne
