= Pavel Ondrašík =

Czech speedway rider (born 1975)

- Born: 10 December 1975 (age 50); Prague, Czechoslovakia
- Nationality: Czech

Career history

Czech Republic
- 1995–2003, 2005–2007: Prague
- 2004: Pardubice

Poland
- 1995: Kraków
- 1996–1998: Opole
- 1999–2000: Rawicz
- 2001: Lublin

Sweden
- 1998–2000: Karlstad
- 2000: Valsarna

Great Britain
- 2001–2003: Trelawny Tigers
- 2004: Newport Wasps
- 2005: Exeter Falcons
- 2006: Somerset Rebels

Individual honours
- 1995, 1996: Czech Under-21 Champion

Team honours
- 2002: Premier Trophy
- 1995, 1998, 2003, 2004: Czech Div One Champion

Pavel Ondrašík (born 10 December 1975 in Prague, Czechoslovakia) is a Czech former motorcycle speedway rider.

== Career ==
Ondrašík failed to gain a work permit despite agreeing terms with Reading Racers in 1996. He finally rode in the United Kingdom five years later, for the Trelawny Tigers in the 2001 Premier League, although he had been targeted previously by King's Lynn Stars.

Ondrašík stayed with the Tigers until their closure in 2003. He then spent seasons with Newport Wasps and the Exeter Falcons. His season with the Somerset Rebels was cut short in 2006 after he suffered a broken wrist.

In 2000, Ondrašík won the silver medal at the Czech Republic Individual Speedway Championship.

== Family ==
Pavel is the son of former Czechoslovak international speedway rider Petr Ondrašík.
