= FIM Long Track of Nations =

Annual motorcycling event

FIM Longtrack of Nations
- Sport: Longtrack
- Founded: 2007
- Continent: World
- Most recent champion: Netherlands
- Most titles: Germany (10 times)

The FIM Long Track of Nations, formerly known as the Long Track Team World Championship, is an annual track racing event since 2007 organized by the International Motorcycling Federation (FIM). The championship has been won by Germany ten times.

The 2020 Championships in Morizès, France and the 2021 Championships in Roden, Netherlands were both cancelled, due to the issues regarding the COVID-19 pandemic.

== Past winners ==
Year	Venue	Winners	Runner-up	3rd place	Ref
2007	(France) Morizès	Germany	Great Britain	France	
2008	(Germany) Werlte	Germany	Netherlands	Great Britain	
2009	(Netherlands) Eenrum	Germany	Netherlands	France	
2010	(France) Morizès	Germany	France	Netherlands	
2011	(Germany) Scheeßel	Germany	Netherlands	Great Britain	
2012	(France) Saint-Macaire	Germany	Great Britain	France	
2013	(United Kingdom) Folkestone	Netherlands	France	Great Britain	
2014	(Finland) Forssa	Germany	Netherlands	France	
2015	(Germany) Mühldorf	Great Britain	Germany	Finland	
2016	(Czech Republic) Mariánské Lázně	Netherlands	Germany	Czech Republic	
2017	(Netherlands) Roden	Germany	France	Netherlands	
2018	(France) Morizès	France	Great Britain	Germany	
2019	(Germany) Vechta	France	Germany	Czech Republic	
2020	(France) Morizès	cancelled due to COVID-19 pandemic			
2021	(Netherlands) Roden	cancelled due to COVID-19 pandemic			
2022	(Germany) Herxheim bei Landau/Pfalz	Germany	Czech Republic	France	
2023	(Netherlands) Roden	Netherlands	Germany	Great Britain	
2024	(France) Morizès	Germany	France	Great Britain	
2025	(Germany) Vechta	Great Britain	Netherlands	Germany	
2026	(Netherlands) Roden	Netherlands	Great Britain	France	

== Classification ==
Rider	First	Second	Third	Podium
Germany	10	4	2	16
Netherlands	4	5	2	11
France	2	4	6	12
(United Kingdom) Great Britain	2	4	5	11
Czech Republic	0	1	2	3
Finland	0	0	1	1

== See also ==
- World Longtrack Championship
- European Grasstrack Championship
