= Jörg Tebbe =

German speedway rider

- Born: 5 April 1979 (age 47); Haselünne, West Germany
- Nationality: German

Career history

Germany

Poland
- 2008: Gniezno

Individual honours
- 2015, 2018: German Longtrack Champion

Team honours
- 2011, 2012, 2014: World Longtrack Team Champion
- 2015, 2016, 2023: World Longtrack Team silver
- 2018: World Longtrack Team bronze

Jörg Tebbe (born 5 April 1979) is an international motorcycle speedway and member of the Germany national long track team.

== Career ==
Tebbe is a three-time world champion, having won the Team Long Track World Championship in 2011, 2012 and 2014.

In addition to having won three World Championship longtrack team gold medals, Tebbe has twice won the Germany longtrack national title in 2015 and 2018. He has competed in the Individual Speedway Long Track World Championship since 2000.

== World Championship titles ==
- 2011 Team Long Track World Championship
- 2012 Team Long Track World Championship
- 2014 Team Long Track World Championship
