= Long track motorcycle racing =

Type of motorcycle sport

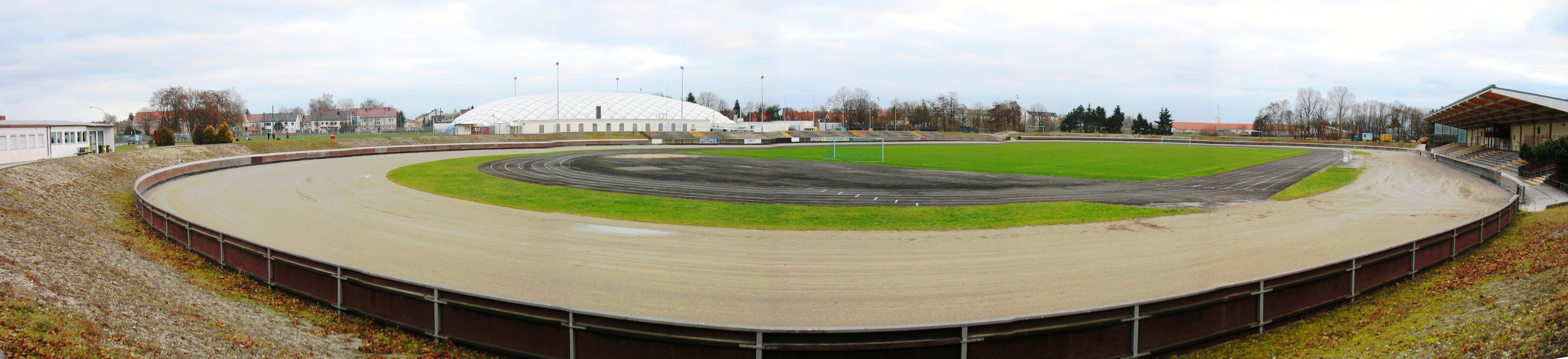
Stadion Haunstetten, a Sandbahn track

Long track (more commonly known as longtrack, or German Sandbahn) is a discipline of track racing, that takes place at high speeds on tracks ranging from 425 to 1,000 metres (1,390 to 3,280 ft) in length. Longtrack racing is an umbrella term for events using long track machinery, similar to that used in speedway but with a longer wheelbase and a two-speed gearbox. This includes grasstrack which uses the same machinery but shares one combined world championship.

The sport is popular in Germany, perhaps even more so than speedway. This means that the majority of tracks are to be found in that country, although tracks can also be found in France, the Netherlands, the Czech Republic, Finland and Norway. Long track meetings are also held in Australia (for both solos and sidecars with both state and national championships), New Zealand and the United States with the higher profile Australian and New Zealand long track grand prix's often attracting the top riders from Europe. Due to the lack of genuine long track speedways in those countries outside of Europe, meetings generally take place at ½ mile (800 m) Harness Racing or Showground venues.

The similarities with speedway means that many riders from that discipline also take part in longtrack. Whilst there are no leagues in longtrack, there are many lucrative open meetings which offer a means of additional income.

== Competitions ==
	World (FIM)
Seniors
Individual	World Individual (1971-); European Individual (1957-1970)
Team	World Team (2007-)

The International Motorcycling Federation (FIM) runs a World Longtrack Series as well as a world championships. Although both events are named long track, they often are competed for on grass.

The Individual Long Track World Championship competitors must qualify through a series of qualifiers. Riders must be selected by their nations motorcycling authority. Riders then must compete in qualifying rounds and hotly contested semi finals before reaching the World Longtrack Series proper.

The Team Long Track World Championship involves each team consisting of 3 riders racing each other for points. The top team at the end is the winner. Germany have won 8 championships.

== See also ==
- Track racing
