= Richard Wolff (speedway rider) =

Czech speedway rider

- Born: 12 June 1976 (age 50); Prague, Czechoslovakia
- Nationality: Czech

Career history

Cezch Republic
- 1995-2003, 2005: Olymp Praha
- 2004: Pardubice

Poland
- 1998-99: Krosno

Great Britain
- 2001-2003: Trelawny Tigers
- 2004: Reading Racers

Individual honours
- 1997: Czech Under-21 Champion

Team honours
- 2002: Premier Trophy
- 1995, 1998, 2003, 2004: Czech Div One Champion
- 1995: Czech Div Two Champion

Richard Wolff (born 12 June 1976 in Prague, Czechoslovakia) is a former motorcycle speedway rider from the Czech Republic.

== Career ==
Wolff first rode in the United Kingdom for the Trelawny Tigers in the Premier League. He stayed with the Tigers until their closure in 2003. He then spent the 2005 season with the Reading Racers.

== Honours ==
- Individual European Championship:
  - 2003 - 14th place (3 points)
  - 2004 - 15th place (2 points)
- European Club Champions' Cup:
  - 2004 - 4th place (12 points)
  - 2006 - 4th place in Semi-Final 2 (2 points)
  - 2007 - 3rd place in Semi-Final 2 (7 points)
