= Werlte =

Place in Lower Saxony, Germany

- Town
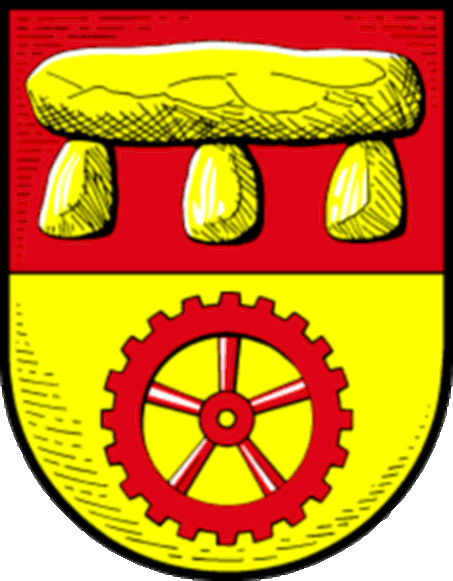
- Coat of arms

- Location of Werlte within Emsland district
- Interactive map of Werlte
- Location within Germany Location within Lower Saxony
- Coordinates: 52°51′N 07°41′E
- Country: Germany
- State: Lower Saxony
- District: Emsland
- Municipal assoc.: Werlte
- Subdivisions: 5

Government
  - Mayor: Daniel Thele (CDU)

Area
  - Total: 63.81 km^{2} (24.64 sq mi)
- Elevation: 32 m (105 ft)

Population (2025-12-31)
  - Total: 10,319
  - Density: 161.7/km^{2} (418.8/sq mi)
- Time zone: UTC+01:00 (CET)
  - Summer (DST): UTC+02:00 (CEST)
- Postal codes: 49757
- Dialling codes: 0 59 51
- Vehicle registration: EL
- Website: www.werlte.de

Werlte (German pronunciation: [ˈvɛʁltə]) is a town in the Emsland district, in Lower Saxony, Germany.

== History ==
Werlte was a host city of the 2008 Team Long Track World Championship; the championship was won by Germany.

== Economy ==
Werlte is home to a factory of the Krone company.

== Twin towns – sister cities ==
Werlte is twinned with:

- Lidzbark Warmiński, Poland (2005)

== Sons and daughters ==
- Ingrid Matthäus-Maier (born 1945), German politician (SPD)
