= Eenrum =

- Village
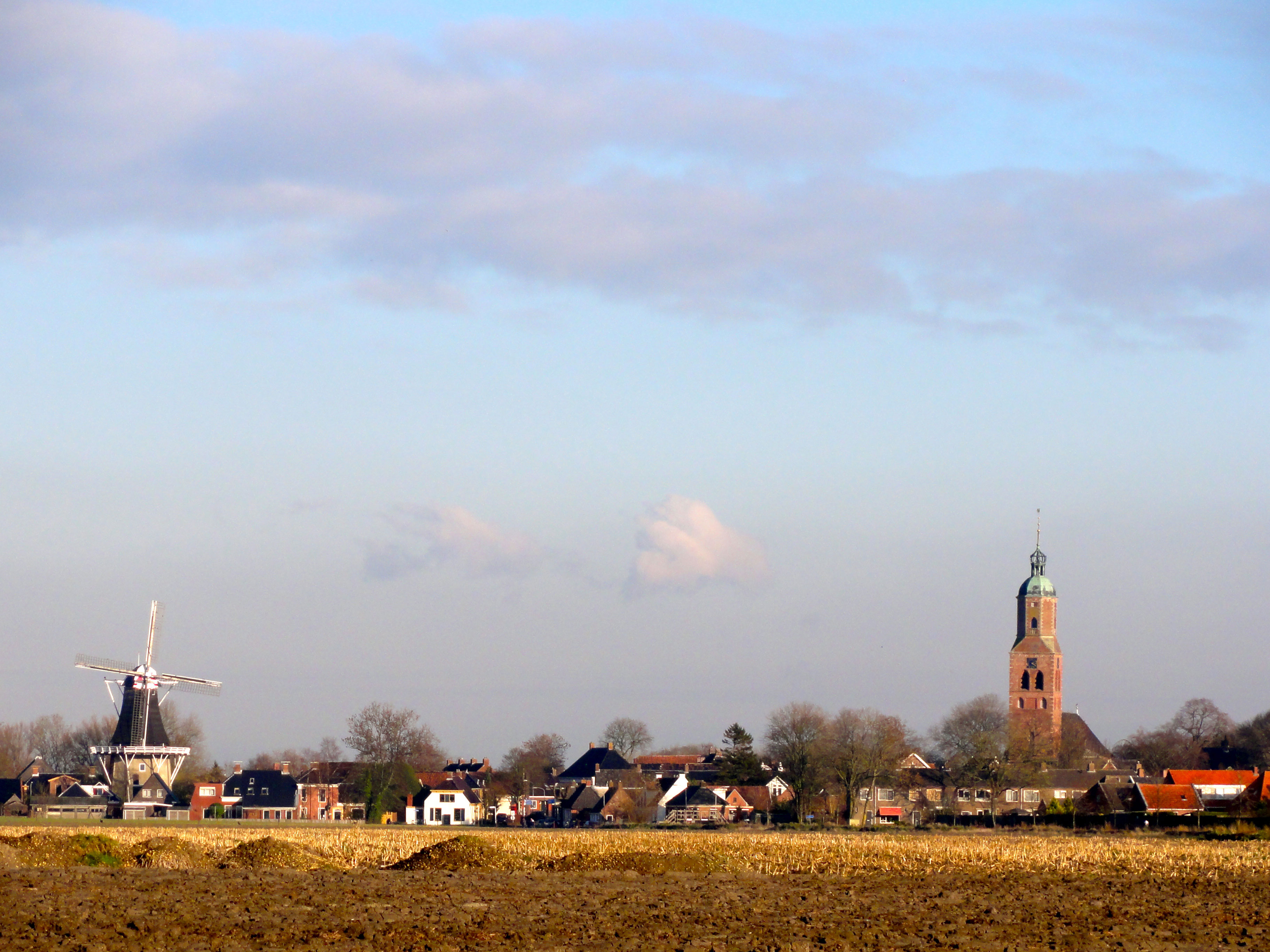
- Eenrum in 2010

- Flag Coat of arms

- Location of Eenrum in the province of Groningen Eenrum (Netherlands)
- Coordinates: 53°22′N 6°28′E
- Country: Netherlands
- Province: Groningen
- Municipality: Het Hogeland

Area
  - Total: 0.72 km^{2} (0.28 sq mi)
- Elevation: 1 m (3.3 ft)

Population
  - Total: 1,365
  - Density: 1,900/km^{2} (4,900/sq mi)
- Time zone: UTC+1 (CET)
  - Summer (DST): UTC+2 (CEST)
- Postal code: 9967
- Dialing code: 0595

Eenrum (Dutch pronunciation: [ˈeːnrʏm]; Gronings: Ainrom [ˈɑinɾɔm]) is a village in the Dutch province of Groningen. It is located in the municipality of Het Hogeland, 17 km northwest of the city of Groningen.

Eenrum was a separate municipality until 1990, then it was merged with Ulrum, Kloosterburen and Leens.

== History ==
Eenrum is a terp (artificial mount) village dating from the Middle Ages. The village was first mentioned in the 10th or 11th century as De Arnarion. The origin of the name is unknown. The church dates from the late 13th century. It had established a local government in 1798, but officially became a municipality in 1808. The local council used to meet in the village pub until 1881 when it was no longer allowed to meet in a public place which served alcohol. It was decided to build a town hall. In 2019, it became part of the municipality Het Hogeland.

== International Sport ==
The village is host to a major motorcycle racing circuit. The venue hosts domestic and international meetings and has hosted World and European Finals. It hosted the 2009 Team Long Track World Championship, which was won by Germany. The host team Netherlands finished second.

== Gallery ==
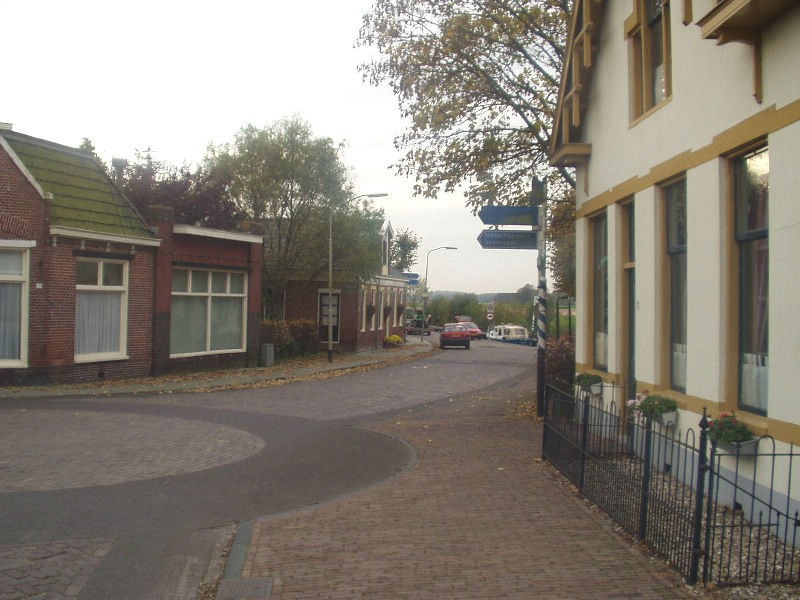
Eenrum, dorpsstraat

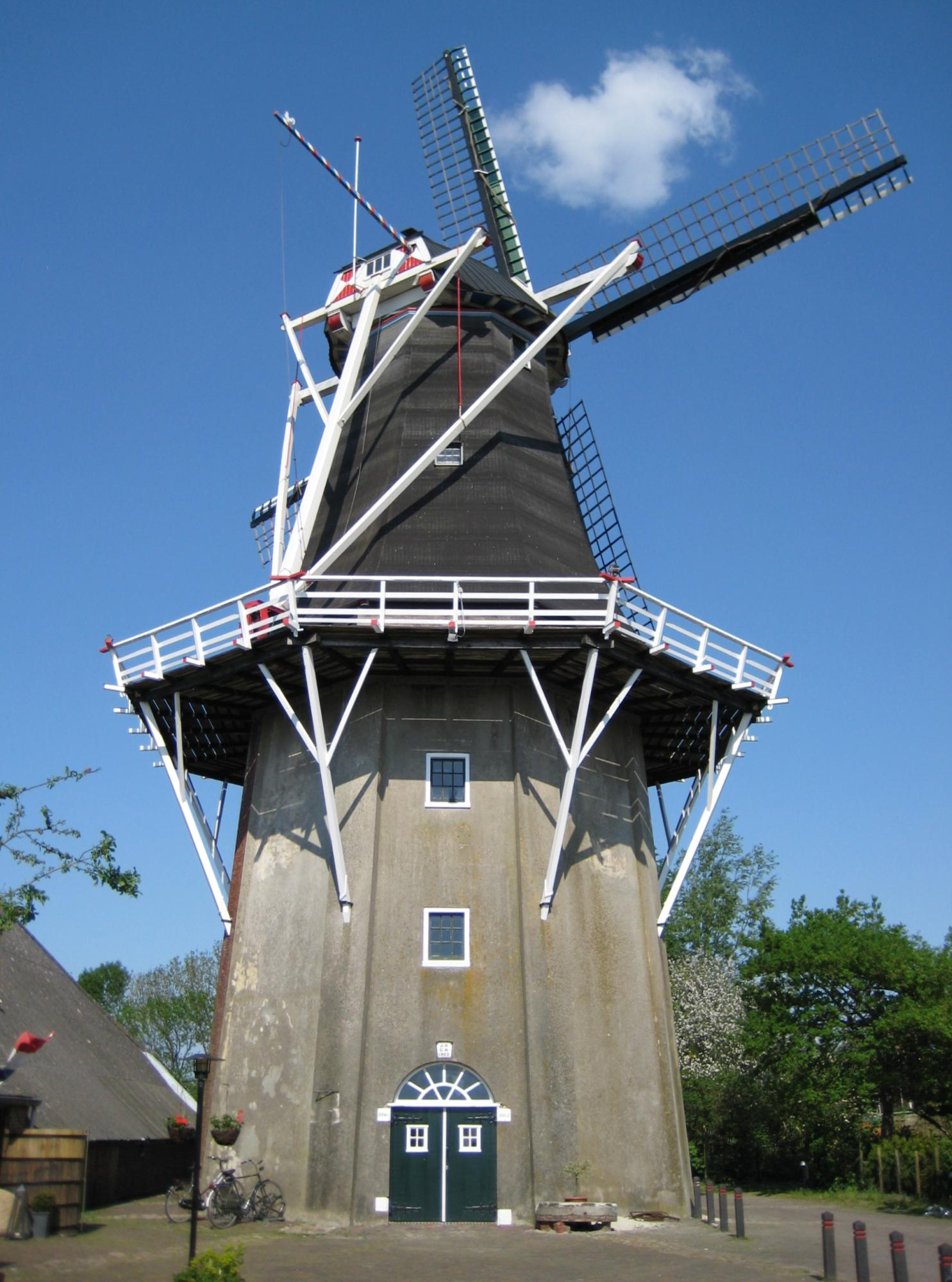
Windmill 'De Lelie'

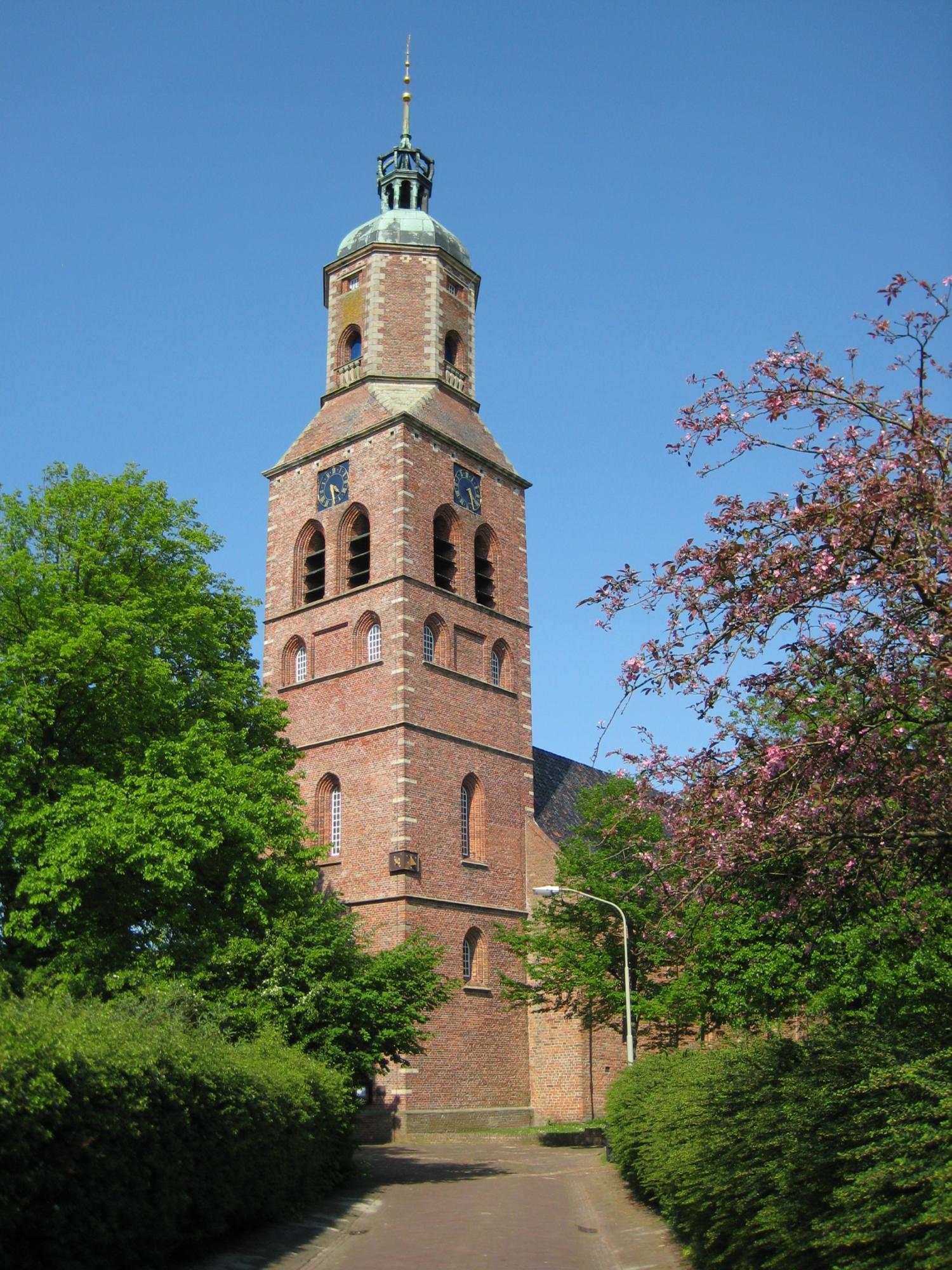
Church in 2008

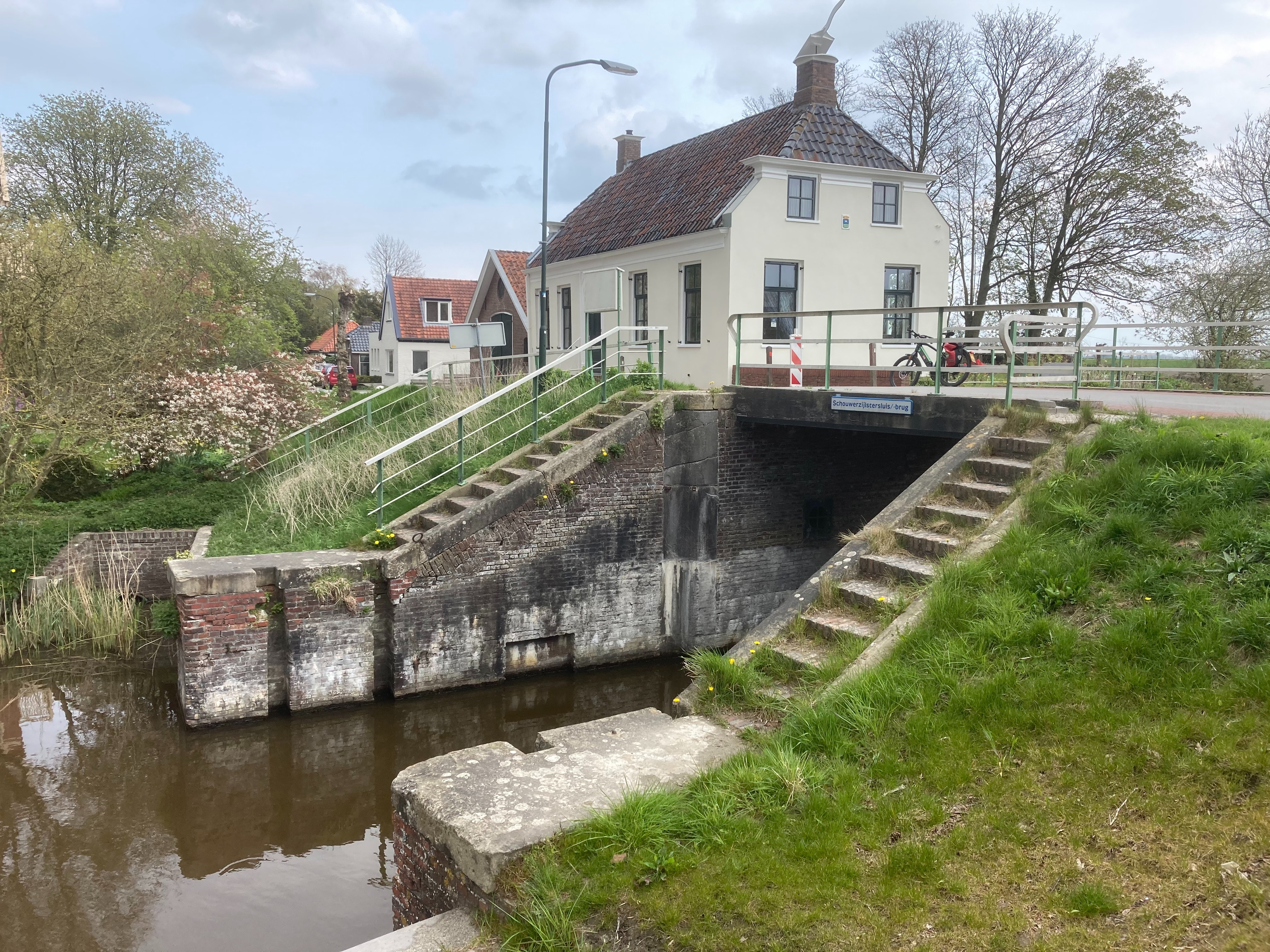
The sluice
