= Saint-Macaire =

- Commune
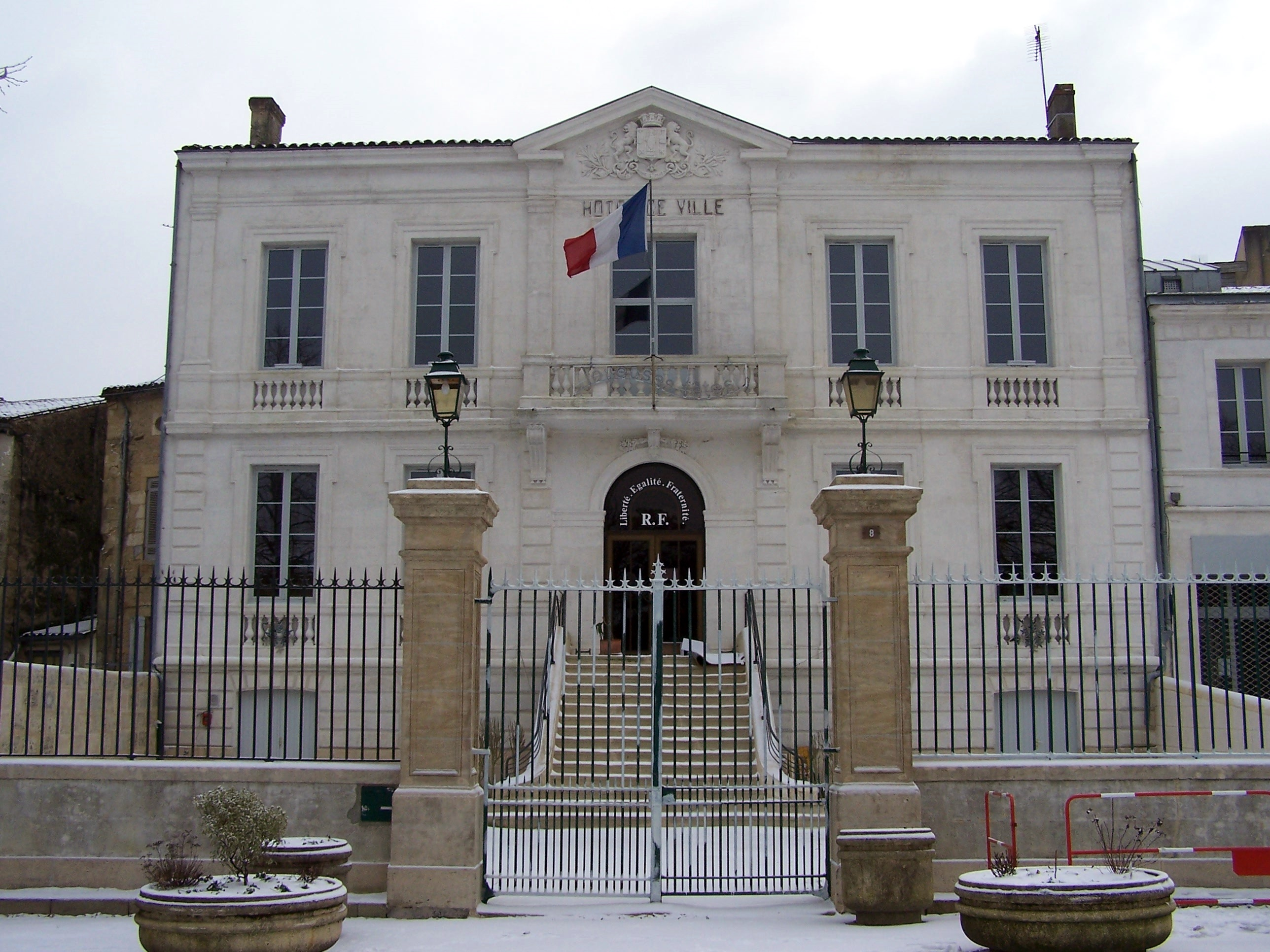
- The town hall in Saint-Macaire

- Coat of arms
- Location of Saint-Macaire
- Location within France Location within Nouvelle-Aquitaine
- Coordinates: 44°34′03″N 0°13′21″W
- Country: France
- Region: Nouvelle-Aquitaine
- Department: Gironde
- Arrondissement: Langon
- Canton: L'Entre-Deux-Mers

Government
  - Mayor (2020–2026): Cédric Gerbeau
- Area^{1}: 1.79 km^{2} (0.69 sq mi)
- Elevation: 12 m (39 ft)
- Highest elevation: 30 m (98 ft)
- Lowest elevation: 0 m (0 ft)
- Population (2023): 1,981
  - Density: 1,110/km^{2} (2,870/sq mi)
- Time zone: UTC+01:00 (CET)
  - Summer (DST): UTC+02:00 (CEST)
- INSEE/Postal code: 33435 /33490
- ^{1} French Land Register data, which excludes lakes, ponds, glaciers > 1 km^{2} (0.386 sq mi or 247 acres) and river estuaries.

Saint-Macaire (French pronunciation: [sɛ̃ makɛʁ]; Occitan: Sent Macari) is a commune in the Gironde department in Nouvelle-Aquitaine in southwestern France. It is the site of the Château de Tardes. Saint-Macaire station has rail connections to Agen, Langon and Bordeaux.

== Population ==
Historical population

Year	Pop.	±% p.a.
1793	1,750	—
1800	1,483	−2.34%
1806	1,543	+0.66%
1821	1,494	−0.21%
1831	1,582	+0.57%
1836	1,535	−0.60%
1841	1,513	−0.29%
1846	1,504	−0.12%
1851	1,467	−0.50%
1856	1,448	−0.26%
1861	1,381	−0.94%
1866	2,165	+9.41%
1872	2,218	+0.40%
1876	2,252	+0.38%
1881	2,023	−2.12%
1886	2,170	+1.41%
1891	2,249	+0.72%
1896	2,283	+0.30%
1901	2,199	−0.75%

Year	Pop.	±% p.a.
1906	2,152	−0.43%
1911	2,037	−1.09%
1921	1,812	−1.16%
1926	1,737	−0.84%
1931	1,705	−0.37%
1936	1,636	−0.82%
1946	1,505	−0.83%
1954	1,618	+0.91%
1962	1,636	+0.14%
1968	1,767	+1.29%
1975	1,679	−0.73%
1982	1,587	−0.80%
1990	1,459	−1.05%
1999	1,541	+0.61%
2007	1,985	+3.22%
2012	2,020	+0.35%
2017	2,076	+0.55%
2023	1,981	−0.78%

Source: EHESS and INSEE (1968-2023)

== See also ==
- Communes of the Gironde department
