= Morizès =

- Commune
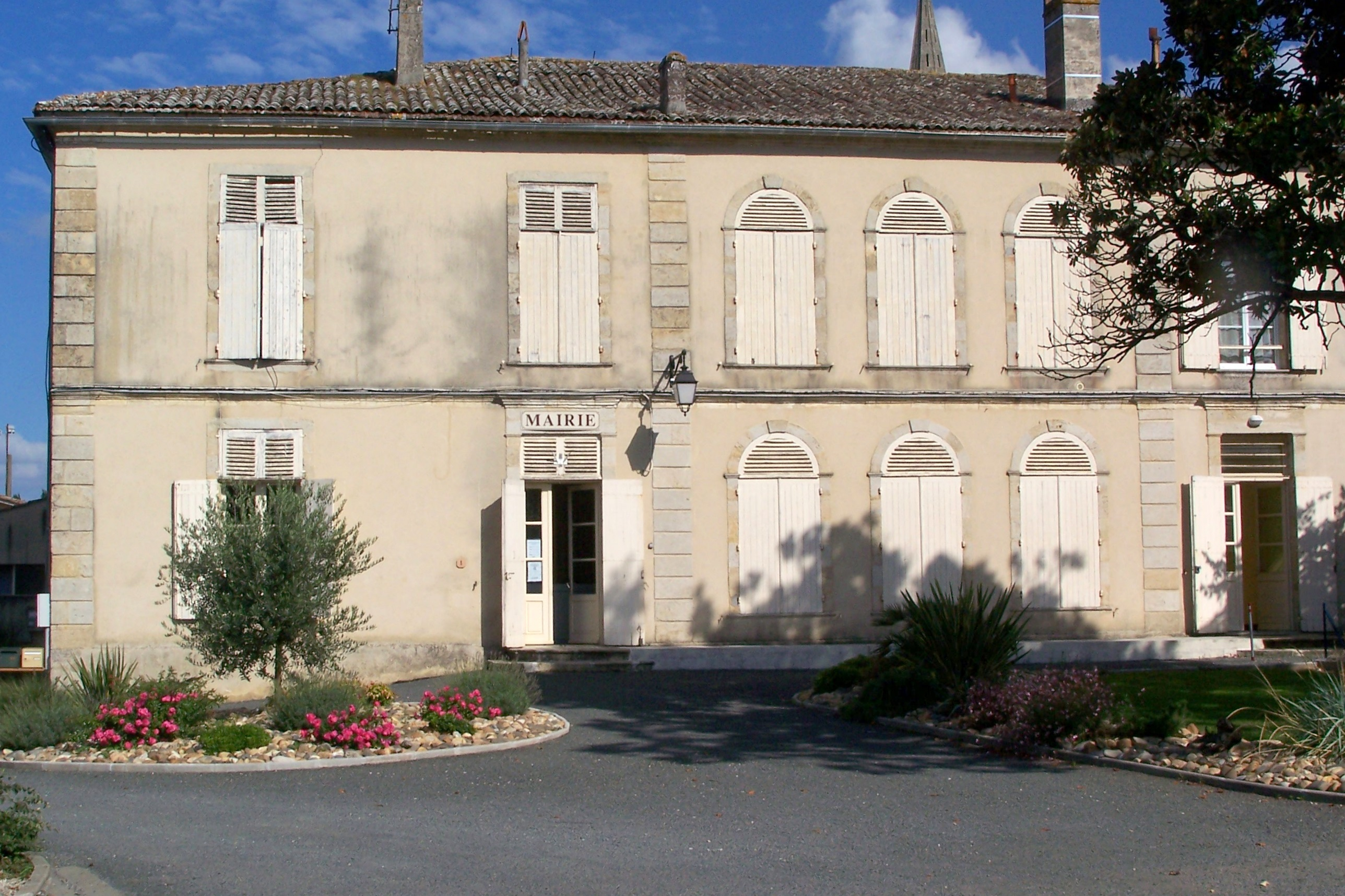
- Town hall
- Location of Morizès
- Location within France Location within Nouvelle-Aquitaine
- Coordinates: 44°36′46″N 0°05′23″W
- Country: France
- Region: Nouvelle-Aquitaine
- Department: Gironde
- Arrondissement: Langon
- Canton: Le Réolais et Les Bastides
- Intercommunality: Réolais en Sud Gironde

Government
  - Mayor (2020–2026): Michèle Chovin
- Area^{1}: 5.87 km^{2} (2.27 sq mi)
- Elevation: 40 m (130 ft)
- Highest elevation: 77 m (253 ft)
- Lowest elevation: 10 m (33 ft)
- Population (2023): 527
  - Density: 89.8/km^{2} (233/sq mi)
- Time zone: UTC+01:00 (CET)
  - Summer (DST): UTC+02:00 (CEST)
- INSEE/Postal code: 33294 /33190
- ^{1} French Land Register data, which excludes lakes, ponds, glaciers > 1 km^{2} (0.386 sq mi or 247 acres) and river estuaries.

Morizès (French pronunciation: [mɔʁizɛs]; Occitan: Maurisèth) is a commune in the Gironde department in Nouvelle-Aquitaine in southwestern France.

== Population ==
Historical population
Year	Pop.	±% p.a.
1968	542	—
1975	514	−0.75%
1982	508	−0.17%
1990	505	−0.07%
1999	507	+0.04%
2007	548	+0.98%
2012	522	−0.97%
2017	545	+0.87%
2023	527	−0.56%
Source: INSEE

== Speedway ==
The motorcycle speedway track dominates the northern area of the commune. It is known as a Long Track and hosts important speedway events such as the 2024 FIM Long Track of Nations. Located at Le Parc, it is home to the Morizes Moto Club.

== See also ==
- Communes of the Gironde department
