= 2010 Individual Long Track World Championship finals =

This page describes the final meetings of the 2010 Individual Long Track World Championship.

The 2010 FIM Long Track World Championship final meeting took place from May 30 to September 18, 2010. There were six final meetings with seventeen permanent riders and one wild card and two track reserves.

== Heat details ==
=== Final One ===
- 30 May 2010
- (Germany) Pfarrkirchen, Bavaria
- Rennbahn Pfarrkirchen (Length: 1,000 m)
- Referee: (Czech Republic) Pavel Vana
- Jury President: (Italy) Armando Castagna
- References

Placing	Draw	Rider Name	Total	1	2	3	4	5	6	7	8	9	10	11	12	Pts	Pos	13	14	Pts	Pos	15
1	13	(Germany) Stephan Katt #8	29			4	5				5			5		19	2		5	24	1	5
2	9	(Finland) Joonas Kylmäkorpi #7	24		4				4		3			4		15	5	5		20	4	4
3	2	(Germany) Jorg Tebbe #11	19	5				3			4			1		13	6		3	16	6	3
4	18	(Germany) Matthias Kröger #4	18			5			3			4		3		15	4	3		18	5	R
5	12	(Germany) Gerd Riss #1	24		5				5	5					5	20	1	4		24	2	X
6	1	(France) Theo Pijper #6	21	4			4			4			5			17	3		4	21	3	T
7	7	(United Kingdom) Andrew Appleton #17	12		1		1					5			3	10	9	2		12	7	
8	16	(Germany) Richard Speiser #12	12			1	3			3					4	11	7		1	12	8	
9	8	(Germany) Jan Pape #10	10		T/-			5		1			4			10	8	0		10	9	
10	5	(France) Mathieu Tresarrieu #14	10	2				4		R					2	8	10		2	10	10	
11	17	(Netherlands) Dirk Fabriek #3	8			3		2			2		1			8	11		0	8	11	
12	11	(Netherlands) Jannick de Jong #16	8		2			1				2		2		7	12	1		8	12	
13	15	(Germany) Enrico Janoschka #13	6			R			2	2			2			6	13			6	13	
14	14	(France) Stephane Tresarrieu #2	5			2		0				3			0	5	14			5	14	
15	6	(Germany) Herbert Rudolph #9	5	1					1		0		3			5	15			5	15	
16	3	(Germany) Martin Smolinski #18	4	3					0			R			1	4	16			4	16	
17	19	(Germany) Bernd Diener #19	3		3											3	17			3	17	
18	10	(United Kingdom) Glen Phillips #5	3		0		2				1		R			3	18			3	18	
19	4	(Czech Republic) Richard Wolff #15	1	0			0					1		R		1	19			1	19	
	20	(Germany) Marcel Dachs #20	0													0				0		

M - exclusion for exceeding two minute time allowance • T - exclusion for touching the tapes • X - other exclusion • E - retired or mechanical failure • F - fell
# - jacket number, if different as draw number

gate A – inside Red	gate B Blue	gate C White	gate D Yellow-Black	gate E Green	gate F – outside Black-White

=== Final Two ===
- 12 June 2010
- (France) Saint-Macaire, Gironde
- Piste Michel Paris (Length: 506 m)
- Referee: (Hungary) Istvan Darago
- Jury President: (Germany) Wolfgang Glas
- References

Placing	Draw	Rider Name	Total	1	2	3	4	5	6	7	8	9	10	11	12	Pts	Pos	13	14	Pts	Pos	15
1	15	(Finland) Joonas Kylmäkorpi #7	29			5			5	4			5			19	1	5		24	1	5
2	9	(Germany) Gerd Riss #1	26		5				4		3			5		17	3		5	22	2	4
3	14	(France) Theo Pijper #6	23			4		3				5			4	16	4	4		20	4	3
4	5	(Germany) Richard Speiser #12	24	4				4		5					5	18	2		4	22	3	2
5	13	(Germany) Matthias Kröger #4	16			2	3				5			4		14	5	1		15	5	1
6	6	(France) Jérôme Lespinase #18	15	5					2		2		3			12	7		3	15	6	0
7	10	(Germany) Jörg Tebbe #11	14		1		4				4		2			11	8	3		14	7	
8	1	(France) Stephane Tresarrieu #2	12	0			5			3			4			12	6		M	12	8	
9	12	(United Kingdom) Andrew Appleton #17	12		3				3	1					3	10	9	2		12	9	
10	11	(United Kingdom) Glen Phillips #5	11		2			2				2		3		9	11		2	11	10	
11	8	(France) Mathieu Tresarrieu #14	9		4			5		R			-			9	10		N	9	11	
12	16	(Netherlands) Jannick de Jong #16	9			3	2			2					2	9	12	0		9	12	
13	3	(Netherlands) Dirk Fabriek #3	6	2					R			4			R	6	13			6	13	
14	18	(Czech Republic) Richard Wolff #15	6			0			1			3		2		6	14			6	14	
15	2	(Germany) Enrico Janoschka #13	5	3				1			0			1		5	15			5	15	
16	4	(France) Maxime Mazeau #19	3	1			1					1		R		3	16			3	16	
17	17	(Germany) Herbert Rudolph #9	2			1		0			1		0			2	17			2	17	
18	7	(Germany) Jan Pape #10	1		0		0					0			1	1	18			1	18	
19	20	(France) Philippe Ostyn #20	1										1			1	19			1	19	
20	4	(Germany) Stephan Katt #8	0	M/-			-					-		-		0	20			0	20	

M - exclusion for exceeding two minute time allowance • T - exclusion for touching the tapes • X - other exclusion • E - retired or mechanical failure • F - fell
# - jacket number, if different as draw number

gate A – inside Red	gate B Blue	gate C White	gate D Yellow-Black	gate E Green	gate F – outside Black-White

=== Final Three ===
- 13 July 2010
- (France) Marmande, Lot-et-Garonne
- Track of Carpète (Piste de Carpète) (Length: 504.60 m)
- Referee: (Germany) Franck Ziegler
- Jury President: (Slovenia) Boris Kotnjek
- References

Placing	Draw	Rider Name	Total	1	2	3	4	5	6	7	8	9	10	11	12	Pts	Pos	13	14	Pts	Pos	15
1	4	(Finland) Joonas Kylmäkorpi #7	28	5			5					5		3		18	1	5		23	1	5
2	12	(Netherlands) Jannick de Jong #16	26		5				5	4					3	17	2		5	22	2	4
3	2	(France) Theo Pijper #6	20	2				4			3			5		14	5	3		17	4	3
4	17	(Germany) Richard Speiser #12	22			4		3			5		4			16	3		4	20	3	2
5	15	(France) Jérôme Lespinase #18	17			R			4	5			3			12	8	4		16	5	1
6	14	(Netherlands) Dirk Fabriek #3	16			2		5				2			4	13	7		3	16	6	0
7	3	(Germany) Matthias Kröger #4	16	3					3			3			5	14	6		2	16	7	
8	6	(France) Mathieu Tresarrieu #14	15	4					2		4		5			15	4	F		15	8	
9	18	(Germany) Enrico Janoschka #13	13			5			1			4		1		11	9	2		13	9	
10	11	(Germany) Stephan Katt #8	11		4			1				1		4		10	10		1	11	10	
11	16	(United Kingdom) Glen Phillips #5	9			1	3			3					2	9	11		0	9	11	
12	1	(Germany) Herbert Rudolph #9	8	1			4			2			M/-			7	12	1		8	12	
13	9	(United Kingdom) Andrew Appleton #17	7		3				0		2			2		7	13			7	13	
14	20	(France) Gabriel Dubernard #20	4								1		2		1	4	14			4	14	
15	8	(Germany) Jörg Tebbe #11	4		1			2		1			0			4	15			4	15	
16	13	(Germany) Gerd Riss #1	3			3	Fx				-			-		3	16			3	16	
17	19	(France) Philippe Ostyn #19	2				2					0		0		2	17			2	17	
18	7	(France) Stephane Tresarrieu #2	2		2		F/-					-			-	2	18			2	18	
19	10	(Germany) Jan Pape #10	2		0		1				R		1			2	19			2	19	
20	5	(Czech Republic) Richard Wolff #15	0	0				0		0					0	0	20			0	20	

M - exclusion for exceeding two minute time allowance • T - exclusion for touching the tapes • X - other exclusion • E - retired or mechanical failure • F - fell
# - jacket number, if different as draw number

gate A – inside Red	gate B Blue	gate C White	gate D Yellow-Black	gate E Green	gate F – outside Black-White

=== Final Four ===
- 22 August 2010
- (Netherlands) Eenrum, Groningen
- Sportpark Eenrum (Length: 625 m)
- Referee: (Poland) Wojciech Grodzki
- Jury President: (Hungary) Janos Nadasdi
- References
- Change:

Draw 6. Gerd Riss → Jérôme Lespinase

Placing	Draw	Rider Name	Total	1	2	3	4	5	6	7	8	9	10	11	12	Pts	Pos	13	14	Pts	Pos	15
1	13	(United Kingdom) Andrew Appleton #17	29			4	5				5			5		19	1	5		24	1	5
2	14	(France) Theo Pijper #6	25			3		5				3			5	16	3		5	21	3	4
3	8	(Finland) Joonas Kylmäkorpi #7	24		5			4		5			5			19	2		2	21	2	3
4	3	(France) Mathieu Tresarrieu #14	20	3					5			4			4	16	4	2		18	4	2
5	1	(Germany) Stephan Katt #8	17	2			4			3			3			12	7		4	16	6	1
6	9	(Germany) Enrico Janoschka #13	18		4				4		2			4		14	5	4		18	5	0
7	11	(Germany) Jörg Tebbe #11	14		2			3				5		3		13	6		1	14	7	
8	16	(Germany) Richard Speiser #12	13			1	2			4					3	10	9	3		13	8	
9	2	(Netherlands) Jannick de Jong #16	12	5				R			3			1		9	10		3	12	9	
10	4	(United Kingdom) Glen Phillips #5	11	4			3					2		2		11	8	0		11	10	
11	6	(France) Jérôme Lespinase #21	9	0					3		1		4			8	12	1		9	11	
12	15	(Netherlands) Mark Stiekema #18	8			5			2	0			1			8	11		0	8	12	
13	10	(Germany) Herbert Rudolph #9	6		R		0				4		2			6	13			6	13	
14	5	(Germany) Matthias Kröger #4	6	1				2		2					1	6	14			6	14	
15	7	(Netherlands) Dirk Fabriek #3	5		1		1					1			2	5	15			5	15	
16	12	(France) Stephane Tresarrieu #2	3		3				Fx	-					-	3	16			3	16	
17	18	(Germany) Jan Pape #10	2			2			R			0		0		2	17			2	17	
18	17	(Czech Republic) Richard Wolff #15	1			0		1			0		0			1	18			1	18	
19	19	(Netherlands) Jeffrey Woortman #19	1							1						1	19			1	19	
20	20	(Netherlands) Sjoerd Rozenberg #20	0												0	0	20			0	20	

M - exclusion for exceeding two minute time allowance • T - exclusion for touching the tapes • X - other exclusion • E - retired or mechanical failure • F - fell
# - jacket number, if different as draw number

gate A – inside Red	gate B Blue	gate C White	gate D Yellow-Black	gate E Green	gate F – outside Black-White

=== Final Five ===
- 11 September 2010
- (Germany) Vechta, Lower Saxony
- Reiterwaldstadion (Length: 535 m)
- Referee: (Czech Republic) Pavel Vana
- Jury President: (France) Christian Bouin
- References
- Changes:

Draw 11. Gerd Riss → Jérôme Lespinase
Draw 13. Stephane Tresarrieu → Mark Stiekema

Placing	Draw	Rider Name	Total	1	2	3	4	5	6	7	8	9	10	11	12	Pts	Pos	13	14	Pts	Pos	15
1	2	(Finland) Joonas Kylmäkorpi #7	27	5				4			5			4		18	1	4		22	3	5
2	3	(France) Mathieu Tresarrieu #14	26	4					3			5			5	17	3		5	22	1	4
3	18	(Germany) Richard Speiser #12	25			4			4			4		5		17	4	5		22	2	3
4	16	(Germany) Martin Smolinski #19	19			5	5			4					X	14	5	3		17	5	2
5	7	(United Kingdom) Andrew Appleton #17	18		5		4					2			3	14	6		3	17	6	1
6	6	(France) Theo Pijper #6	19	3					5		4		5			17	2		2	19	4	R
7	14	(Germany) Stephan Katt #8	15			1		5				1			4	11	7		4	15	7	
8	17	(United Kingdom) Glen Phillips #5	13			2		2			3		4			11	8	2		13	8	
9	5	(Germany) Herbert Rudolph #9	10	R				3		5					2	10	9	T		10	9	
10	10	(Germany) Daniel Rath #18	10		4		T/-				2		3			9	11		1	10	10	
11	1	(Germany) Jörg Tebbe #11	10	2			3			3			2			10	10		0	10	11	
12	9	(Netherlands) Jannick de Jong #16	10		3				2		1			3		9	12	1		10	12	
13	4	(Germany) Enrico Janoschka #13	7	1			2					3		1		7	13			7	13	
14	15	(Germany) Matthias Kröger #4	7			3			1	2			1			7	14			7	14	
15	8	(Netherlands) Dirk Fabriek #3	3		2			1		0			R			3	15			3	15	
16	12	(Czech Republic) Richard Wolff #15	3		1				0	1					1	3	16			3	16	
17	11	(France) Jérôme Lespinase #21	2		R			0				0		2		2	17			2	17	
18	13	(Netherlands) Mark Stiekema #24	1			N	1				0			0		1	18			1	18	
19	20	(Germany) Marcel Dachs #20	0				0									0	19			0	19	
	16	(Germany) Jan Pape #10	0			-	-			-					-	0				0		

M - exclusion for exceeding two minute time allowance • T - exclusion for touching the tapes • X - other exclusion • E - retired or mechanical failure • F - fell
# - jacket number, if different as draw number

gate A – inside Red	gate B Blue	gate C White	gate D Yellow-Black	gate E Green	gate F – outside Black-White

=== Final Six ===
- 19 September 2010
- (Czech Republic) Marianske Laszne
- Stadium of Lokomotiva Mariánské Lázně (Length: 1,000 m)
- Referee: (Germany) Christian Froschauer
- Jury President: (Denmark) Jörgen L. Jensen
- References
- Changes:

Draw 5. Gerd Riss → Jérôme Lespinase
Draw 14. Stephane Tresarrieu → Vladimir Trofimov

Placing	Draw	Rider Name	Total	1	2	3	4	5	6	7	8	9	10	11	12	Pts	Pos	13	14	Pts	Pos	15
1	10	(Germany) Stephan Katt #8	27		5		4				3		5			17	2		5	22	2	5
2	18	(United Kingdom) Andrew Appleton #17	24			5			4			5		2		16	3		4	20	3	4
3	2	(Germany) Herbert Rudolph #9	27	5				5			4			5		19	1	5		24	1	3
4	13	(Germany) Jörg Tebbe #11	20			1	5				5			4		15	4	3		18	4	2
5	8	(Czech Republic) Josef Franc #18	19		4			4		2			4			14	5	4		18	5	1
6	3	(United Kingdom) Glen Phillips #5	15	4					2			3			4	13	6		2	15	6	0
7	12	(Germany) Matthias Kröger #4	12		R				3	3					5	11	7		1	12	7	
8	15	(France) Theo Pijper #6	12			2			5	R			2			9	10		3	12	8	
9	4	(Germany) Enrico Janoschka #13	12	2			3					4		1		10	8	2		12	9	
10	16	(France) Mathieu Tresarrieu #14	11			4	2			1					3	10	9	1		11	10	
11	5	(France) Jérôme Lespinase #21	9	1				1		5					2	9	11		0	9	11	
12	1	(Netherlands) Dirk Fabriek #3	8	0			1			4			3			8	12	R		8	12	
13	17	(Finland) Joonas Kylmäkorpi #7	8			3		3			2		0			8	13			8	13	
14	9	(Germany) Richard Speiser #12	7		3				R		1			3		7	14			7	14	
15	6	(Netherlands) Jannick de Jong #16	5	3					1		0		1			5	15			5	15	
16	11	(Czech Republic) Richard Wolff #15	3		1			0				2		0		3	16			3	16	
17	7	(Germany) Jan Pape #10	2		2		0					Fx			-	2	17			2	17	
18	14	(Ukraine) Vladimir Trofimov #22	2			0		2				F/-			-	2	18			2	18	
19	19	(Czech Republic) Michael Hádek #19	2									1			1	2	19			2	19	
20	20	(Czech Republic) Zdenek Schneiderwind #20	0												0	0	20			0	20	

M - exclusion for exceeding two minute time allowance • T - exclusion for touching the tapes • X - other exclusion • E - retired or mechanical failure • F - fell
# - jacket number, if different as draw number

gate A – inside Red	gate B Blue	gate C White	gate D Yellow-Black	gate E Green	gate F – outside Black-White

== See also ==
- 2010 Speedway Grand Prix
- 2010 Team Long Track World Championship
