= Robert Barth =

German motorcycle speedway rider (born 1968)

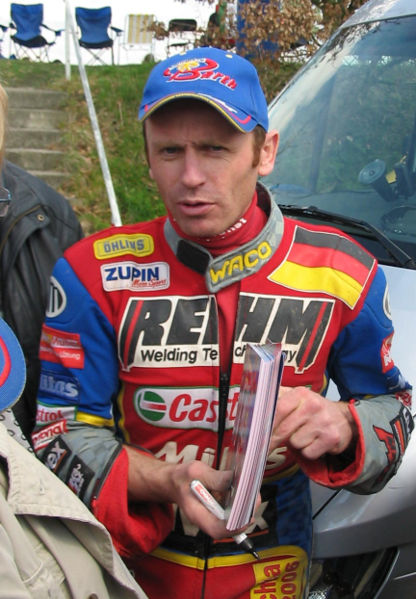
- Born: 10 August 1968 (age 58)
- Nationality: German

Career history

Germany
- 1990–1992, 2005–2006: Olching
- 1997–2001: Landshut
- 2003–2004: Güstrow

Poland
- 1999: Gdańsk
- 2000: Zielona Góra

Individual honours
- 2002, 2003, 2005, 2006: Long Track World Champion
- 2000, 2001: German Speedway Champion
- 1994, 1999, 2001, 2003, 2005, 2006: German Longtrack champion
- 1997, 2001, 2002, 2003: German Silver Helmet Winner
- 1997, 2001, 2002, 2003: German Longtrack Golden Helmet Winner

Robert Barth (born 10 August 1968) is a German former motorcycle speedway rider. He is a four time champion of the world.

== Life ==
Barth was born on born 10 August 1968.

== Career ==
Barth won four Long Track World Championships, in 2002, 2003, 2005 and 2006. He also rode in the Speedway Grand Prix.

Barth twice won the German Individual Speedway Championship 2001 and 2002.

Barth was also a prominent grasstrack rider and won three European Championship titles in 1989, 1990 and 1994. The grasstrack championship merged with the Longtrack and Barth finished runner-up three times (1996, 1999 and 2000) before winning his world titles.

Barth retired in 2006 but retained an interest in the sport becoming an engine tuner. He helped Lukas Fienhage become the 2020 World Longtrack champion.

== Major results ==
=== Speedway ===
World Individual Championships

Speedway Grand Prix results

1997 Speedway Grand Prix Final Championship standings (Riding No 16)
Race no.	Grand Prix	Pos.	Pts.	Heats	Draw No
3 /6	(Germany) German SGP	11	7	(1,0,3,1,2) +1C	6

1998 Speedway Grand Prix Final Championship standings (Riding No 23)
Race no.	Grand Prix	Pos.	Pts.	Heats	Draw No
2 /6	(Germany) German SGP	22	2	(0,1)	23

2001 Speedway Grand Prix Final Championship standings (Riding No 23)
Race no.	Grand Prix	Pos.	Pts.	Heats	Draw No
1 /6	(Germany) German SGP	14	6	(0,2,2) (0,1)	23

2004 Speedway Grand Prix Final Championship standings (Riding No 23)
Race no.	Grand Prix	Pos.	Pts.	Heats	Draw No
2 /9	(Czech Republic) Czech Rep. SGP	21	2	(0,1)	23

permanent speedway rider
wild card, track reserve or qualified reserve
rider not classified (track reserve who did not start)

World Team Championships

- Team World Championship (Speedway World Team Cup and Speedway World Cup)
  - 2000 - 3rd place in Semi Final B
  - 2002 - (England) Owlerton Stadium - 4th place in Event 1

European Championships

- European Club Champions' Cup
  - 2000 - (Poland) Piła - Bronze medal (10 points)
  - 2001 - (Latvia) Daugavpils - 4th place (8 points)

=== Longtrack ===
Individual World Championships

- 1991 Semi-final
- 1992 Semi-final
- 1993 Semi-final
- 1994 (Czech Republic) Mariánské Lázně (14th) 4pts
- 1995 (Germany) Scheeßel (13th) 4pts
- 1996 (Germany) Herxheim bei Landau/Pfalz (Third) 23pts

Grand-Prix Years

- 1997 Did not compete
- 1998 5 app (Second) 93pts
- 1999 5 app (Second) 79pts
- 2000 5 app (Second) 98pts
- 2001 4 app (Third) 70pts
- 2002 5 app (Champion) 113pts
- 2003 6 app (Champion) 131pts
- 2004 2 app (16th) 36pts
- 2005 4 app (Champion) 83pts
- 2006 3 app (Champion) 75pts

Best Grand-Prix Results

- (England) Abingdon-on-Thames First 2000
- (Netherlands) Aduard Third 1998
- (Germany) Berghaupten Second 1999
- (Germany) Bielefeld First 2003, Third 2002
- (England) Collier Street Second 2001, 2003
- (France) Saint-Colomb-de-Lauzun First 2002
- (Netherlands) Eenrum Second 2000, Third 1999
- (Germany) Herxheim Second 2001
- (France) Marmande First 2005, 1998, Third 2003
- (France) Morizès First 2000, 2002, 2003, 2006, Second 2005, Third 2001, 2004
- (Germany) Mühldorf First 2003, Second 1998, 1999, 2005
- (New Zealand) New Plymouth Third 2003
- (Germany) Parchim Second 2002, Third 2005
- (Germany) Pfarrkirchen Third 2004
- (Germany) Scheeßel First 2002
- (France) Saint-Macaire First 2006
- (Germany) Vechta First 2006

German Longtrack Championship

- 1994 (Germany) Vilshofen Champion
- 1997 (Germany) Ludinghausen Third
- 1999 (Germany) Herxheim am Berg Champion
- 2000 (Germany) Scheeßel Second
- 2001 (Germany) Berghaupten Champion
- 2002 (Germany) Harsewinkel Second
- 2003 (Germany) Ludinghausen Champion
- 2004 (Germany) Mühldorf 7th
- 2005 (Germany) Bad Hersfeld Champion
- 2006 (Germany) Berghaupten Champion

Grasstrack European Championships

- 1988 (Netherlands) Joure (7th) 10pts
- 1989 (France) La Réole (Champion) 21Pts
- 1990 (Netherlands) Uithuizen (Champion) 24Pts
- 1994 (Germany) Cloppenburg (Champion) 25Pts

== See also ==
- Germany national speedway team
- List of Speedway Grand Prix riders
