= 2010 FIM Long Track World Championship =

Motorcycle racing competition

2010 Individual Long Track World Championship

Seasons
- ← 2009 2011 →

The 2010 Individual Long Track World Championship was the 2010 and 40th edition of the FIM speedway Individual Long Track World Championship season. Champion was determined in six finals between 30 May and 19 September 2010.

The Championship was won by Joonas Kylmäkorpi, who won three of six Grand Prix event and scoring 140 points. Kylmäkorpi beat Theo Pijper (120 pts) and Richard Speiser (103 pts). Top seven riders get qualify to the Grand Prix' next season, and next eight riders qualify to the Long Track Challenge. The defending World Champion, Gerd Riss crashed at Final Three and he did not participate at next events (after Final Two he was second placed, losing three points to Kylmäkorpi).

== Riders ==
There will be seventeen permanent riders:

- top seven placed riders from the 2009 Individual Long Track World Championship,
- top seven riders from the Long Track Challenge
- three riders nominated by the CCP for all Final Meetings.

One Wild Card and two Track Reserve riders will be nominated by organising national federation

In case of the absence of one or more riders in the final meetings, the first available Qualified Substitute rider or riders will be elevated for that meeting, and take the place(s) of the relevant missing rider(s). The list of Qualified Substitute riders was published by the CCP before the season according to Long Track Challenge last year.

A starting position draw for each final meeting will be balloted by the CCP.

=== 2009 Championship ===
- (1) GER Gerd Riss
- (2) FRA Stephane Tresarrieu
- (3) NED Dirk Fabriek
- (4) GER Matthias Kröger
- (5) GBR Glen Phillips
- (6) FRA Theo Pijper (Dutch, starting with French licency)
- (7) FIN Joonas Kylmäkorpi

=== Long Track Challenge ===
- (8) GER Stephan Katt
- (9) GER Herbert Rudolph
- (10) ITA Alessandro Milanese withdraw and was replaced by first Qualified Substitutes rider GER Jan Pape
- (11) GER Jorg Tebbe
- (12) GER Richard Speiser
- (13) GER Enrico Janoschka
- (14) FRA Mathieu Tresarrieu

=== Nominations ===
- (15) CZE Richard Wolff
- (16) NED Jannick de Jong
- (17) GBR Andrew Appleton

=== Wild cards and track reserves ===
- Final One in Pfarrkirchen, Germany

(18) GER Martin Smolinski
(19) GER Bernd Diener
(20) GER Marcel Dachs

- Final Two in Saint-Macaire, France

(18) FRA Jérôme Lespinase
(19) FRA Maxime Mazeau
(20) FRA Philippe Ostyn

- Final Three in Marmande, France

(18) FRA Jérôme Lespinase
(19) FRA Philippe Ostyn
(20) FRA Gabriel Dubernard

- Final Four in Eenrum, Netherlands

(18) NED Mark Stiekema
(19) NED Jeffrey Woortman
(20) NED Sjoerd Rozenberg

- Final Five in Vechta, Germany

(18) GER Daniel Rath
(19) GER Martin Smolinski
(20) GER Marcel Dachs

- Final Six in Mariánské Lázně, Czech Republic

(18) CZE Josef Franc
(19) CZE Michael Hádek
(20) CZE Zdenek Schneiderwind

=== Qualified Substitutes ===
- (21) FRA Jerome Lespinasse
- (22) UKR Vladimir Trofimiv
- (23) FIN Rene Lehtinen
- (24) NED Mark Stiekema
- (25) ITA Massimo Mora
- (26) FRA Maxime Mazeau

== Grand Prix ==
=== Format ===
Race format
Gate	A (inside)	B	C	D	E	F (outside)
Heat No	Riders starting No
1	1	2	3	4	5	6
2	7	8	9	10	11	12
3	13	14	15	16	17	18
4	16	10	4	13	7	1
5	11	5	17	8	2	14
6	6	12	18	9	3	15
7	12	15	8	1	16	5
8	9	13	2	17	6	10
9	3	7	11	18	14	4
10	17	6	10	15	1	8
11	18	4	9	2	13	11
12	5	16	7	14	12	3

The riders' starting position draw will be balloted before each Final Meeting by the CCP.

Each Qualifying Round, Semi-Final, Long Track Challenge or Final Round must be organised in 15 heats with 6 riders in each heat (heats will consist of 4 laps). Heats 1 to 12 are called Qualifying Heats and must be conducted according to the following schedule of heats (like in a table)

After heat 12, there will be an intermediate classification from the 1st to the 20th place according to the total race points each rider has scored during the Qualifying heats. The 12 top-scoring riders from the Qualifying heats will qualify for the Semi-Finals:

- Semi-final one (heat 13): 1st, 4th, 5th, 8th, 9th and 12th in the intermediate classification,
- Semi-final two (heat 14): 2nd, 3rd, 6th, 7th, 10th and 11th in the intermediate classification.

Riders' gate positions for each Semi-Final (Heats 13 and 14) will be chosen by the riders, in the order determined by their position in the Classification after qualifying heats.

The 6 top-scoring riders from the second intermediate classification after the Qualifying Heats and Semi-finals will qualify for the Final (Heat 15). Riders' gate positions for the Final heat (Heat 15) will be chosen by the riders. The draw order shall be determined by the second intermediate classification (after the Qualifying and Semi-Final Heats).

If a rider cannot take part in a Semi-Final or Final heat for which he has already qualified, he will automatically be considered placed in the last position of the heat and will be not replaced by a following rider in the Intermediate Classification list.

=== Results ===
The total points scored by each rider from the Qualifying heats, Semi-final and Final heats (Heats 1–15) in a Final Meeting will be credited as World Championship points in the overall championship and the Intermediate World Championship Classification will be according to these credited points.

The total race points scored by each rider during the whole event (Heats 1–15) will determine the final classification for the Final Meeting. Positions 1 to 6 in the Final Meeting Classification will be according to the result of the final heat (Heat 15) irrespective of the total race points scored.

#	Date	Venue	Winners	Runner-up	3rd place
1	May 30	(Germany) Pfarrkirchen	(Germany) Stephan Katt (29 pts)	(Finland) Joonas Kylmäkorpi (24 pts)	(Germany) Jörg Tebbe (19 pts)
2	June 12	(France) Saint-Macaire	(Finland) Joonas Kylmäkorpi (29 pts)	(Germany) Gerd Riss (26 pts)	(France) Theo Pijper (23 pts)
3	July 13	(France) Marmande	(Finland) Joonas Kylmäkorpi (28 pts)	(Netherlands) Jannick de Jong (26 pts)	(France) Theo Pijper (20 pts)
4	August 22	(Netherlands) Eenrum	(United Kingdom) Andrew Appleton (29 pts)	(France) Theo Pijper (25 pts)	(Finland) Joonas Kylmäkorpi (24 pts)
5	September 11	(Germany) Vechta	(Finland) Joonas Kylmäkorpi (27 pts)	(France) Mathieu Tresarrieu (26 pts)	(Germany) Richard Speiser (25 pts)
6	September 19	(Czech Republic) Mariánské Lázně	(Germany) Stephan Katt (27 pts)	(United Kingdom) Andrew Appleton (24 pts)	(Germany) Herbert Rudolph (27 pts)

== Classification ==
The FIM Long Track World Champion will be the rider having collected the most points at the end of the Long Track World Championship Final Meeting series.

In case of riders tied on World Championship points in the Intermediate Classification, the better placed rider in the last Final Meeting will be considered the better placed rider.

In case of riders involved in a tie on the Final Overall World Championship Classification, the following will apply:

1. Run-off for 1st, 2nd and 3rd place.
2. Run-off for 7th place, which is the last qualifying place for the following year's Final rounds.
3. For all other placing, the better placed rider in the last Final meeting will be considered the better placed rider.

Pos.	Rider	Points	(Germany)	(France)	(France)	(Netherlands)	(Germany)	(Czech Republic)
Gold	(Finland) (7) Joonas Kylmäkorpi	140	24	29	28	24	27	8
Silver	(France) (6) Theo Pijper	120	21	23	20	25	19	12
Bronze	(Germany) (12) Richard Speiser	103	12	24	22	13	25	7
4	(United Kingdom) (17) Andrew Appleton	102	12	12	7	29	18	24
5	(Germany) (8) Stephan Katt	99	29	0	11	17	15	27
6	(France) (14) Mathieu Tresarrieu	91	10	9	15	20	26	11
7	(Germany) (11) Jörg Tebbe	81	19	14	4	14	10	20
8	(Germany) (4) Matthias Kröger	75	18	16	16	6	7	12
9	(Netherlands) (16) Jannick de Jong	70	8	9	26	12	10	5
10	(United Kingdom) (5) Glen Phillips	62	3	11	9	11	13	15
11	(Germany) (13) Enrico Janoschka	61	6	5	13	18	7	12
12	(Germany) (9) Herbert Rudolph	58	5	2	8	6	10	27
13	(Germany) (1) Gerd Riss	53	24	26	3	–	–	–
14	(France) (18)(21) Jérôme Lespinase	52	–	15	17	9	2	9
15	(Netherlands) (3) Dirk Fabriek	46	8	6	16	5	3	8
16	(Germany) (18)(19) Martin Smolinski	23	4	–	–	–	19	–
17	(France) (2) Stephane Tresarrieu	22	5	12	2	3	–	–
18	(Czech Republic) (18) Josef Franc	19	–	–	–	–	–	19
19	(Germany) (10) Jan Pape	17	10	1	2	2	ns	2
20	(Czech Republic) (15) Richard Wolff	14	1	6	0	1	3	3
21	(Germany) (18) Daniel Rath	10	–	–	–	–	10	–
22	(Netherlands) (18)(24) Mark Stiekema	9	–	–	–	8	1	–
23	(France) (20) Gabriel Dubernard	4	–	–	4	–	–	–
24	(France) (19)(20) Philippe Ostyn	3	–	1	2	–	–	–
25	(France) (19) Maxime Mazeau	3	–	3	–	–	–	–
26	(Germany) (19) Dernd Diener	3	3	–	–	–	–	–
27	(Ukraine) (22) Vladimir Trofimov	2	–	–	–	–	–	2
28	(Czech Republic) (19) Michael Hádek	2	–	–	–	–	–	2
29	(Netherlands) (19) Jeffrey Woortman	1	–	–	–	1	–	–
30	(Czech Republic) (20) Zdenek Schneiderwind	0	–	–	–	–	–	0
31	(Germany) (20) Marcel Dachs	0	ns	–	–	–	0	–
32	(Netherlands) (20) Sjoerd Rozenberg	0	–	–	–	0	–	–

== See also ==
- 2010 Team Long Track World Championship
- 2010 Speedway Grand Prix
