= 2011 Individual Long Track World Championship qualification =

This page describes the qualifying procedure for the 2011 Individual Long Track World Championship finals.

== Heat details ==
=== Qualification Round One ===
- 29 May 2010
- (France) Les Artigues-de-Lussac, Gironde
- Aérodrome de Libourne (Length: 49O m)
- Referee: (Hungary) Istvan Darago
- Jury President: (Finland) Ilkka Teromaa
- References
- Changes:

Draw 1. (Belgium) → (France)
Draw 7. (Italy) → (United Kingdom) Paul Cooper → Perry
Draw 3. (Netherlands) Henry Van Der Steen → Reserve 19. Dubernard

| Placing | Draw | Rider Name | Total | 1 | 2 | 3 | 4 | 5 | 6 | 7 | 8 | 9 | 10 | 11 | 12 | Pts | Pos | 13 | 14 | Pts | Pos | 15 |
| 1 | 17 | (Germany) Martin Smolinski | 24 | | | 4 | | 5 | | | 5 | | 5 | | | 19 | 1 | 1 | | 20 | 1 | 4 |
| 2 | 7 | (United Kingdom) Tom Perry | 23 | | 4 | | 4 | | | | | 4 | | | 2 | 14 | 5 | 4 | | 18 | 5 | 5 |
| 3 | 14 | (France) Jérôme Lespinasse | 21 | | | 5 | | 4 | | | | 5 | | | 3 | 17 | 3 | | 3 | 20 | 2 | 1 |
| 4 | 6 | (France) Maxime Mazeau | 21 | 4 | | | | | 5 | | 3 | | 4 | | | 16 | 4 | 3 | | 19 | 4 | 2 |
| 5 | 11 | (Finland) Rene Lehtinen | 20 | | 5 | | | 2 | | | | 2 | | 3 | | 12 | 7 | | 5 | 17 | 6 | 3 |
| 6 | 16 | (Switzerland) Sirg Schützbach | 19 | | | 2 | 5 | | | 5 | | | | | 5 | 17 | 2 | | 2 | 19 | 3 | 0 |
| 7 | 13 | (Germany) Christian Hülshorst | 17 | | | 1 | 3 | | | | 4 | | | 5 | | 13 | 6 | | 4 | 17 | 7 | |
| 8 | 18 | (Czech Republic) Pavel Ondrašík | 16 | | | 3 | | | 3 | | | 1 | | 4 | | 11 | 9 | 5 | | 16 | 8 | |
| 9 | 2 | (France) Théo Di Palma | 13 | 5 | | | | 3 | | | 1 | | | 2 | | 11 | 8 | 2 | | 13 | 9 | |
| 10 | 3 | (France) Gabriel Dubernard | 11 | 3 | | | | | 1 | | | 3 | | | 4 | 11 | 10 | | X | 11 | 10 | |
| 11 | 9 | (Netherlands) Sjoerd Rozenberg | 8 | | 3 | | | | 2 | | 2 | | | 1 | | 8 | 11 | | R | 8 | 11 | |
| 12 | 12 | (Netherlands) Roy Klaasens | 7 | | 1 | | | | 4 | 2 | | | | | 0 | 7 | 12 | 0 | | 7 | 12 | |
| 13 | 8 | (Netherlands) Jeffrey Woortman | 6 | | 2 | | | 1 | | - | | | 3 | | | 6 | 13 | | | 6 | 13 | |
| 14 | 20 | (France) Mathieu Albertini | 5 | | | | | | | 4 | | | | | 1 | 5 | 14 | | | 5 | 14 | |
| 15 | 1 | (France) Jérémy Coste Lescoul | 5 | 2 | | | 1 | | | 0 | | | 2 | | | 5 | 15 | | | 5 | 15 | |
| 16 | 19 | (France) Guillaume Comblon | 4 | | | | | | | 3 | | | 1 | | | 4 | 16 | | | 4 | 16 | |
| 17 | 10 | (United Kingdom) Martyn Sturgeon | 2 | | 0 | | 2 | | | | 0 | | 0 | | | 2 | 17 | | | 2 | 17 | |
| 18 | 5 | (Norway) Kim Rudi Juritzen | 2 | 1 | | | | 0 | | 1 | | | | | - | 2 | 18 | | | 2 | 18 | |
| 19 | 4 | (Czech Republic) Karel Kadlec | 0 | 0 | | | 0 | | | | | 0 | | 0 | | 0 | 19 | | | 0 | 19 | |
| 20 | 15 | (Norway) Marius Røkeberg | 0 | | | 0 | | | 0 | - | | | - | | | 0 | 20 | | | 0 | 20 | |

M - exclusion for exceeding two minute time allowance • T - exclusion for touching the tapes • X - other exclusion • E - retired or mechanical failure • F - fell
# - jacket number, if different as draw number

| gate A – inside Red | gate B Blue | gate C White | gate D Yellow-Black | gate E Green | gate F – outside Black-White |

=== Qualification Round Two ===
- 31 July 2010
- (Germany) Wertle
- “Hümmlingring Arena” (Length: 541 m)
- Referee: (Poland) Wojciech Grodzki
- Jury President: (Russia) Christian Bouin
- References
- Changes:

Draw 8. (Austria) → (Netherlands)

| Placing | Draw | Rider Name | Total | 1 | 2 | 3 | 4 | 5 | 6 | 7 | 8 | 9 | 10 | 11 | 12 | Pts | Pos | 13 | 14 | Pts | Pos | 15 |
| 1 | 10 | (Germany) Bernd Diener | 29 | | 5 | | 5 | | | | 5 | | 5 | | | 20 | 1 | 5 | | 25 | 1 | 4 |
| 2 | 13 | (Netherlands) Mark Stiekema | 25 | | | 5 | 4 | | | | 4 | | | 5 | | 18 | 3 | | 4 | 22 | 2 | 3 |
| 3 | 9 | (United Kingdom) Richard Hall | 24 | | 3 | | | | 5 | | 3 | | | 3 | | 14 | 6 | | 5 | 19 | 4 | 5 |
| 4 | 18 | (United Kingdom) Daniel Rath | 22 | | | 4 | | | 4 | | | 5 | | 4 | | 17 | 4 | 4 | | 21 | 3 | 1 |
| 5 | 5 | (Germany) Paul Cooper | 20 | 4 | | | | 5 | | 5 | | | | | 4 | 18 | 2 | | 0 | 18 | 6 | 2 |
| 6 | 7 | (Finland) Aki Pekka Mustonen | 19 | | 4 | | 3 | | | | | 4 | | | 5 | 16 | 5 | 3 | | 19 | 5 | 0 |
| 7 | 14 | (Ukraine) Vladimir Trofimov | 12 | | | 3 | | 4 | | | | 3 | | | R | 10 | 7 | | 2 | 12 | 7 | |
| 8 | 16 | (Czech Republic) Richard Wolff | 12 | | | 1 | 1 | | | 4 | | | | | 3 | 9 | 10 | | 3 | 12 | 8 | |
| 9 | 2 | (Germany) Marcel Dachs | 11 | 5 | | | | 3 | | | 1 | | | R | | 9 | 9 | 2 | | 11 | 9 | |
| 10 | 6 | (Sweden) Joel Nyström | 11 | 1 | | | | | 3 | | 2 | | 4 | | | 10 | 8 | 1 | | 11 | 10 | |
| 11 | 15 | (Netherlands) Henry van der Steen | 10 | | | 2 | | | 2 | 2 | | | 3 | | | 9 | 11 | | 1 | 10 | 11 | |
| 12 | 4 | (Netherlands) Erik Eijbergen | 7 | 3 | | | 2 | | | | | R | | 2 | | 7 | 12 | 0 | | 7 | 12 | |
| 13 | 12 | (Germany) Robert Baumann | 4 | | R | | | | 1 | 3 | | | | | R | 4 | 13 | | | 4 | 13 | |
| 14 | 8 | (Netherlands) Denis Noordman | 4 | | 2 | | | 0 | | 0 | | | 2 | | | 4 | 14 | | | 4 | 14 | |
| 15 | 3 | (France) Philippe Ostyn | 4 | M/- | | | | | 0 | | | 2 | | | 2 | 4 | 15 | | | 4 | 15 | |
| 16 | 11 | (Germany) Toni Kröger | 4 | | F | | | 2 | | | | 1 | | 1 | | 4 | 16 | | | 4 | 16 | |
| 17 | 1 | (Czech Republic) Michael Hádek | 4 | 2 | | | R | | | 1 | | | 1 | | | 4 | 17 | | | 4 | 17 | |
| 18 | 17 | (France) Xavier Muratet | 1 | | | 0 | | 1 | | | 0 | | 0 | | | 1 | 18 | | | 1 | 18 | |
| 19 | 19 | (Germany) Ronny Stüdemann | 0 | 0 | | | | | | | | | | | | 0 | 19 | | | 0 | 19 | |
| | 20 | (Germany) Jan Pape | 0 | | | | | | | | | | | | | 0 | | | | 0 | | |

M - exclusion for exceeding two minute time allowance • T - exclusion for touching the tapes • X - other exclusion • E - retired or mechanical failure • F - fell
# - jacket number, if different as draw number

| gate A – inside Red | gate B Blue | gate C White | gate D Yellow-Black | gate E Green | gate F – outside Black-White |

=== Long Track Challenge ===
- 25 September 2010
- (Finland) Forssa, Kanta-Häme
- Pilvenmäki (trotting track) (Length: 1.000 m)
- Referee: (France) Thierry Bouin
- Jury President: (United Kingdom) Anthony Noel
- References
- Qualified riders:
  - The 12 top placed riders from the Qualification rounds. If a rider is not able to take part in the Long Track Challenge, he will be replaced by the next placed rider from his last Qualification Meeting.
  - Riders placed eight to thirteen from the 2010 World Championship final classification. If a rider is not able to take part in the Long Track Challenge, he will be replaced by the next placed rider on the Final Classification list.
  - Track reserve riders: Two riders nominated by the host national federation.
- Changes:
  - from QR One:

(France) Maxime Mazeau (4th)

  - from QR Two:

(United Kingdom) Paul Cooper

  - from Grand Prix:

(Germany) Enrico Janoschka (11th)
(Germany) Gerd Riss (13th)

| Placing | Draw | Rider Name | Total | 1 | 2 | 3 | 4 | 5 | 6 | 7 | 8 | 9 | 10 | 11 | 12 | Pts | Pos | 13 | 14 | Pts | Pos | 15 |
| | 1 | (Czech Republic) Richard Wolff | 0 | | | | | | | | | | | | | 0 | | | | 0 | | |
| | 2 | (Finland) Rene Lehtinen | 0 | | | | | | | | | | | | | 0 | | | | 0 | | |
| | 3 | (Czech Republic) Pavel Ondrašík | 0 | | | | | | | | | | | | | 0 | | | | 0 | | |
| | 4 | (Germany) Matthias Kröger | 0 | | | | | | | | | | | | | 0 | | | | 0 | | |
| | 5 | (France) Jérôme Lespinasse | 0 | | | | | | | | | | | | | 0 | | | | 0 | | |
| | 6 | (Finland) Aki Pekka Mustonen | 0 | | | | | | | | | | | | | 0 | | | | 0 | | |
| | 7 | (United Kingdom) Daniel Rath | 0 | | | | | | | | | | | | | 0 | | | | 0 | | |
| | 8 | (United Kingdom) Richard Hall | 0 | | | | | | | | | | | | | 0 | | | | 0 | | |
| | 9 | (Netherlands) Jannick de Jong | 0 | | | | | | | | | | | | | 0 | | | | 0 | | |
| | 10 | (France) Théo Di Palma | 0 | | | | | | | | | | | | | 0 | | | | 0 | | |
| | 11 | (Germany) Martin Smolinski | 0 | | | | | | | | | | | | | 0 | | | | 0 | | |
| | 12 | (Netherlands) Mark Stiekema | 0 | | | | | | | | | | | | | 0 | | | | 0 | | |
| | 13 | (United Kingdom) Glen Phillips | 0 | | | | | | | | | | | | | 0 | | | | 0 | | |
| | 14 | (France) Gabriel Dubernard | 0 | | | | | | | | | | | | | 0 | | | | 0 | | |
| | 15 | (United Kingdom) Tom Perry | 0 | | | | | | | | | | | | | 0 | | | | 0 | | |
| | 16 | (Germany) Bernd Diener | 0 | | | | | | | | | | | | | 0 | | | | 0 | | |
| | 17 | (Switzerland) Sirg Schützbach | 0 | | | | | | | | | | | | | 0 | | | | 0 | | |
| | 18 | (Germany) Herbert Rudolph | 0 | | | | | | | | | | | | | 0 | | | | 0 | | |
| | 19 | (Finland) Pasi Pullianen | 0 | | | | | | | | | | | | | 0 | | | | 0 | | |
| | 20 | (Finland) Tommi Ahlgren | 0 | | | | | | | | | | | | | 0 | | | | 0 | | |

M - exclusion for exceeding two minute time allowance • T - exclusion for touching the tapes • X - other exclusion • E - retired or mechanical failure • F - fell
# - jacket number, if different as draw number

| gate A – inside Red | gate B Blue | gate C White | gate D Yellow-Black | gate E Green | gate F – outside Black-White |

== See also ==
- 2010 Individual Long Track World Championship
- 2011 Speedway Grand Prix Qualification
