= Zdeněk Schneiderwind =

Czech motorcycle speedway rider

Zdenek Schneiderwind
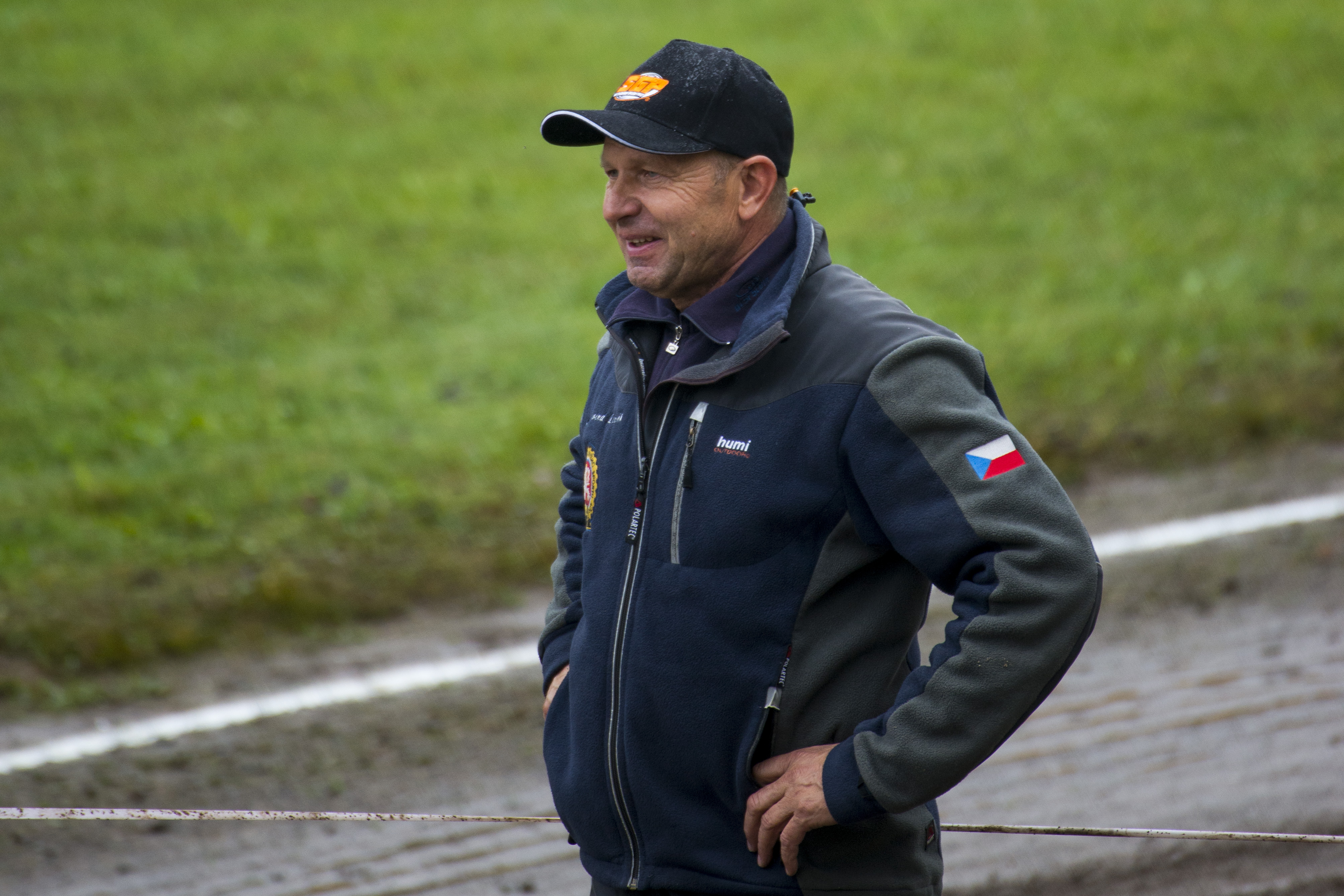
- Born: 31 January 1962 (age 64); Czechoslovakia
- Nationality: Czech

Career history

Czechoslovakia
- 1984–1989: Rudá Hvězda Praha
- 1990–1991: Olymp Praha

Poland
- 1990-1991: Unia Tarnów
- 1992: GKM Grudziądz
- 1994: Stal Rzeszów
- 1997: Wanda Kraków
- 1998: TŻ Noban Opole

Individual honours
- 1989: Czechoslovakia Longtrack champion
- 2003, 2005, 2006, 2007, 2008: Czech Longtrack champion
- 1998 & 2000: European Grasstrack Championship
- 1992: Czechoslovak Grasstrack champion

Zdeněk Schneiderwind (born 31 January 1962) is a former motorcycle speedway rider who competed in speedway, Longtrack and Grasstrack racing.

== Career ==
Schneiderwind reached two World Longtrack world championship Finals as well as 13 Grand-Prix series. He appeared in 18 European Grasstrack Champion finals winning the championship twice.

On 10 October 1987, Schneiderwind set a new track record at the Letňa Avia, in Čakovice of 1:11.1 min. In 1987, he represented the Czechoslovak national team during the final of the 1987 Speedway World Team Cup.

Schneiderwind reached the semi-final of the 1991 Individual Speedway World Championship.

== Major results ==
=== World Final appearances ===
==== World Team Cup ====
- 1987 - (Denmark) Fredericia, Fredericia Speedway, (England) Coventry, Brandon Stadium, (Czech Republic) Prague, Markéta Stadium (with Roman Matoušek / Petr Vandírek / Lubomír Jedek / Antonín Kasper Jr.) – 4th – 36pts (4)

==== World Longtrack Championship ====
One Day Finals

- 1995 (Germany) Scheeßel (17th) 5pts
- 1996 (Germany) Herxheim bei Landau/Pfalz (N/S Reserve)

Grand-Prix Years

- 1997 5 app (6th) 65pts
- 1998 5 app (11th) 39pts
- 1999 5 app (6th) 57pts
- 2000 5 app (6th) 51pts
- 2001 4 app (15th) 23pts
- 2002 2 app (19th) 9pts
- 2003 6 app (5th) 65pts
- 2004 4 app (8th) 44.5pts
- 2005 Semi-finalist
- 2006 3 app (9th) 25pts
- 2007 3 app (14th) 19pts
- 2008 2 app (18th) 19pts
- 2090 6 app (16th) 29pts
- 2010 1 app (32nd) 0pts

==== World Team Championship ====
- 2007 (France) Morizès (4th) 18/37pts (Rode with Richard Wolff, Pavel Ondrašík, Karel Kadlec)
- 2008 (Germany) Werlte (5th) 0/28pts (Rode with Richard Wolff, Pavel Ondrašík, Karel Kadlec)
- 2009 (Netherlands) Eenrum (5th) 12/27pts (Rode with Richard Wolff, Pavel Ondrašík)
- 2010 (France) Morizès (6th) 8/25pts (Rode with Richard Wolff, Pavel Ondrašík, Josef Franc)

=== Grasstrack ===
European Grasstrack Championship

Finals

- 1985 (France) La Réole (12th) 6pts
- 1989 (France) La Réole (15th) 5pts
- 1991 (Germany) Werlte (7th) 11pts
- 1992 (Belgium) Alken (15th) 3pts
- 1994 (Germany) Cloppenburg (4th) 19pts, After Run-off
- 1995 (Netherlands) Joure (5th) 15pts
- 1996 (Netherlands) Joure (Third) 21pts
- 1998 (Germany) Schwarme (Champion) 19pts
- 1999 (Germany) Werlte (Runner-up) 23pts
- 2000 (France) Saint-Colomb-de-Lauzun (Champion) 23pts
- 2001 (Netherlands) Noordwolde (Runner-up) 19pts
- 2002 (Netherlands) Berghaupten (Runner-up) 14pts
- 2003 (France) La Réole (5th) 16pts
- 2004 (Netherlands) Eenrum (7th) 8pts
- 2005 (Germany) Schwarme (20th) 1pt
- 2006 (France) La Réole (14th) 4pts
- 2007 (England) Folkestone (19th) 0pts
- 2008 (Netherlands) Siddeburen (18th) 1pt

Semi-finalist

- 1986 (Netherlands) Siddeburen (15th) 4pts
- 1987 (Netherlands) Uithuizen (11th) 8pts
- 2009 (Germany) Hertingan (13th) 3pts
- 2010 (Netherlands) Siddeburen (18th) 1pt

Preliminary round

- 1993 (Netherlands) Joure (14th) 4pts
- 1988 (England) Tonbridge (11th) 8pts

Czech Republic Longtrack Championship

- 2003 (Czech Republic) Mariánské Lázně (Champion) 20pts
- 2004 Did not compete
- 2005 (Czech Republic) Mariánské Lázně (Champion) 15pts
- 2006 (Czech Republic) Mariánské Lázně (Champion) 20pts
- 2007 (Czech Republic) Mariánské Lázně (Champion) 18pts
- 2008 (Czech Republic) Mariánské Lázně (Champion) 18pts
- 2009 (Czech Republic) Mariánské Lázně (6th) 16pts
- 2010 (Czech Republic) Mariánské Lázně (7th) 10pts
