= Sebastien Trésarrieu =

French motorcycle racer

- Born: 10 January 1981 (age 45); Bordeaux, France
- Nationality: French

Career history
- 2001-2004: Isle of Wight
- 2004: Eastbourne
- 2005: Swindon
- 2005: Exeter

Individual honours
- 2000, 2015: French Grasstrack Champion

Sebastien Trésarrieu (born 10 January 1981) is a French motorcycle racer and competes in Grasstrack, Longtrack and motorcycle speedway. He earned two caps for the France national speedway team.

== Career ==
Trésarrieu raced in Britain from 2001 until 2005 for the Isle of Wight Islanders. Additionally, he rode for Swindon Robins and Exeter Falcons.

== Family ==
Trésarrieu has two brothers who also compete in motorcycle racing, they are Mathieu Trésarrieu and Stéphane Trésarrieu and a nephew Mathias Trésarrieu.

== World Longtrack Championship ==
=== Grand-Prix Years ===
- 2000 - 1 app (18th) 16pts
- 2001 - 1 app (20th) 2pts
- 2006 - 1 app (23rd) 0pts

== European Grasstrack Championship ==
- 1998 (Netherlands) Schwarme (6th) 14pts
- 1999 Did not compete
- 2000 (France) Saint-Colomb-de-Lauzun (6th) 15pts
- 2001 (Netherlands) Noordwolde (18th) 4pts
- 2002 Did not compete
- 2003 (France) La Réole (18th) 2pts
- 2004 Did not compete
- 2005 Did not compete
- 2006 (France) La Réole (8th) 22pts
- 2007 Did not compete
- 2008 Semi-finalist
