= 2008 FIM Long Track World Championship =

Motorcycle racing competition

2008 Individual Long Track World Championship

The 2008 Individual Long Track/Grasstrack World Championship was the 38th edition of the FIM speedway Individual Long Track World Championship.

The world title was won by Gerd Riss of Germany for the seventh time.

== Venues ==
Round	Date	Venue
1	24 May	(Czech Republic) Mariánské Lázně
2	28 Jun	(France) Saint-Macaire
3	6 Sep	(France) Morizès
4	13 Sep	(Germany) Vechta

== Final Classification ==
Pos	Rider	Round 1	Round 2	Round 3	Round 4	Total Pts
1	(Germany) Gerd Riss	20	18	25	16	79
2	(England) Glen Phillips	18	10	20	18	66
3	(Netherlands) Dirk Fabriek	12	25	14	14	65
4	(England) Andrew Appleton	11	13	18	20	62
5	(Netherlands) Theo Pijper	10	7	13	25	55
6	(Germany) Matthias Kröger	8	16	12	12	48
7	(Germany) Stephan Katt	6	14	5	13	38
8	(France) Stephane Tresarrieu	x	11	16	10	37
9	(Netherlands) Jannick de Jong	4	9	9	11	33
10	(Finland) Joonas Kylmäkorpi	13	20	x	x	33
11	(Germany) Daniel Bacher	25	2	2	x	29
12	(Germany) Sirg Schutzbach	14	0	8	5	27
13	(Germany) Jörg Tebbe	x	6	11	9	26
14	(Germany) Herbert Rudolph	7	1	10	6	24
15	(Czech Republic) Richard Wolff	5	5	6	7	23
16	(Germany) Daniel Rath	3	8	7	3	21
17	(Germany) Enrico Janoschka	9	12	x	x	21
18	(Czech Republic) Zdenek Schneiderwind	16	3	x	x	19
19	(France) Jerome Lespinasse	x	4	3	8	15
20	(Czech Republic) Pavel Ondrašík	2	x	1	4	7
21	(Netherlands) Erik Eijbergen	1	x	4	1	6
22	(Germany) Toni Kroger	x	x	x	2	2
