= Theo Pijper =

Dutch motorcycle speedway rider (born 1980)

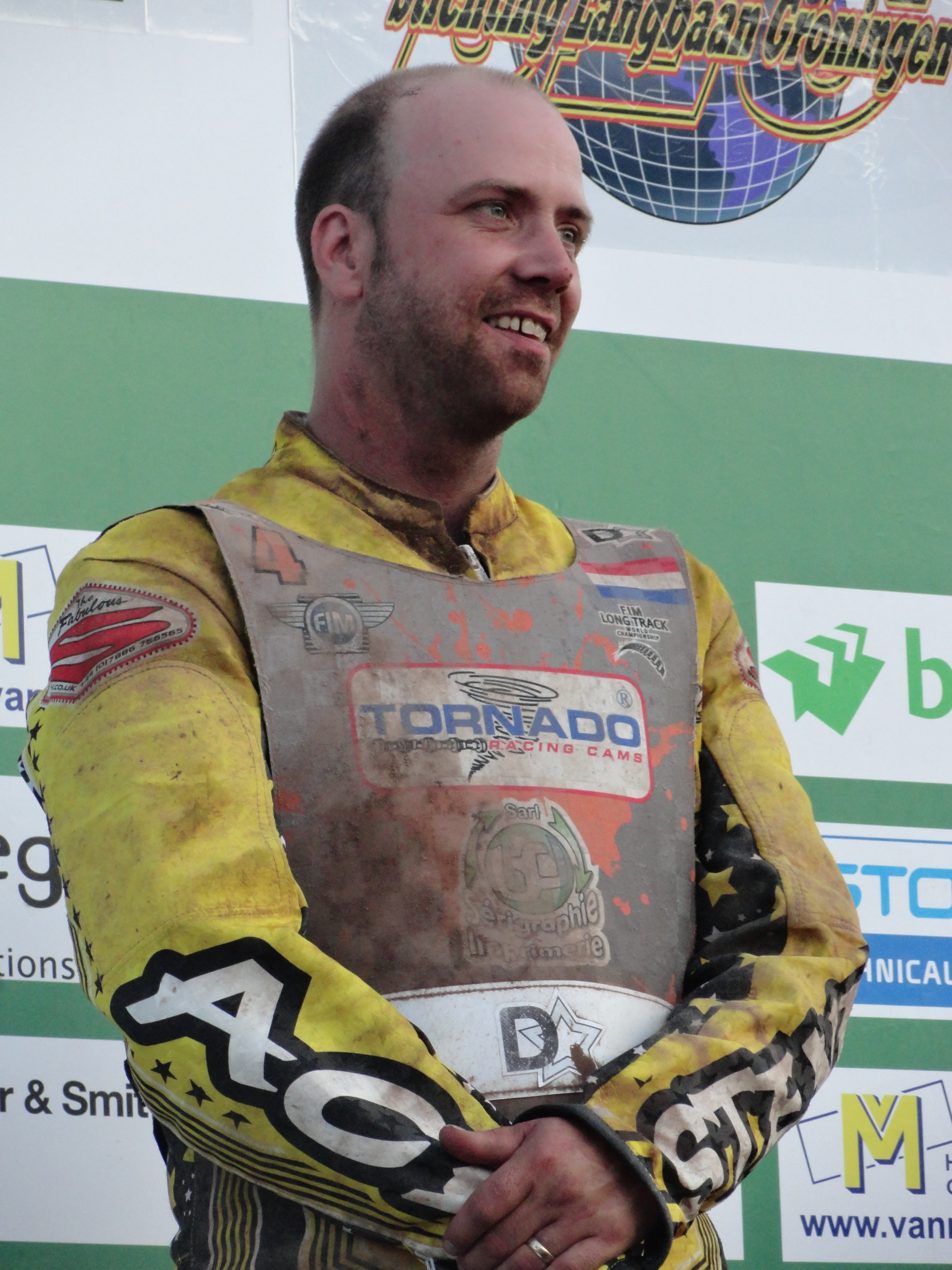
- Born: 11 February 1980 (age 46); Dokkum, Netherlands
- Nationality: Dutch

Career history

Great Britain
- 2002–2007, 2012–2013: Edinburgh
- 2007: Wolverhampton
- 2007, 2018, 2022: Berwick
- 2008: Swindon
- 2008: Mildenhall
- 2011, 2014: Glasgow
- 2015, 2021: Scunthorpe
- 2018: Redcar

Denmark
- 2019: Esbjerg

Individual honours
- 2004, 2007: European Grasstrack Championship
- 2008: French Speedway Champion

Team honours
- 2013, 2016: World Longtrack Team Champion
- 2003, 2011: Premier League Champion
- 2008: Elite Shield
- 2013: Premier League Fours

Theo Pijper (born 11 February 1980) is a Dutch motorcycle speedway rider. He earned 2 caps for the Netherlands national speedway team.

== Career ==
Born in Dokkum, Netherlands, Pijper first rode a motorbike at the age of five. He was a successful long track rider before starting his speedway career. He made his debut in British speedway in 2002 with Edinburgh Monarchs, staying with the team until 2007 in a spell that included a Premier League title in 2003. In 2004, he won the European Grasstrack Championship at Eenrum.

In 2007, Pijper moved up to the Elite League with Wolverhampton Wolves, but after losing his place in the team returned to the Monarchs for a short spell, later moving to Berwick Bandits. He lost his team place once again, but later that season won the European Grasstrack Championship for a second time. He joined Elite League team Swindon Robins in 2008, but lost his place in June, going on to a spell with Mildenhall Fen Tigers in the Premier League.

Pijper returned to British speedway in 2011 with Glasgow Tigers, with whom he won the Premier League in both 2011 and 2012, and also signed with Elite League Birmingham Brummies as their number eight.

In 2012, Pijper returned to the Edinburgh Monarchs team, and was part of the 2013 Premier League Four-Team Championship winning team. In 2018 he signed to ride for the Redcar Bears.

After a season with Scunthorpe in 2021, Pijper rejoined Berwick Bandits for the SGB Championship 2022.

Pijper represented the Netherlands national long track team in the World Longtrack Championship from 2007 to 2022 and twice won the World championship titles at the 2013 Team Long Track World Championship in Folkestone, England and 2016 Team Long Track World Championship in Mariánské Lázně in the Czech Republic.

== World Longtrack ==
=== Grand Prix Years ===
- 1998 - 1 app (25th) 3pts
- 1999 - 2 app (14th) 23pts
- 2000 - 5 app (14th) 30pts
- 2001 - 4 app (6th) 45pts
- 2002 - 5 app (5th) 72pts
- 2003 - 6 app (6th) 64pts
- 2004 - 5 app (5th) 63pts
- 2005 - 3 app (7th) 40pts
- 2006 - 3 app (4th) 48pts
- 2007 - 3 app (7th) 36pts
- 2008 - 4 app (5th) 55pts
- 2009 - 5 app (6th) 75pts
- 2010 - 6 app (Second) 120pts
- 2001 - 6 app (4th) 96pts
- 2012 - 6 app (4th) 124pts
- 2013 - 6 app (14th) 52pts
- 2014 - 2 app (11th) 31pts
- 2015 - 4 app (4th) 61pts
- 2016 - 5 app (4th) 83pts
- 2017 - 5 app (6th) 63pts
- 2018 - 5 app (6th) 64pts
- 2019 - 5 app (6th) 66pts
- 2018 - 2 app (6th) 26pts
- 2021 - 2 app (Third) 24pts
- 2022 - 5 app (6th) 61pts

=== Grand-Prix podiums ===
- (Germany) Vechta First 2008, Second 2006
- (Norway) Forus First 2011
- (New Zealand) New Plymouth Second 2004
- (France) Morizès Second 2011, Third 2013
- (Netherlands) Eenrum Second 2010
- (Germany) Scheeßel Third 2001
- (Germany) Mühldorf Third 2005
- (France) Saint-Macaire Third 2010
- (France) Marmande Third 2010
- (Finland) Forssa Third 2012
- (Netherlands) Groningen Third 2012

== European Grasstrack Championship ==
- 1999 (Germany) Werlte (NS)
- 2000 Did not compete
- 2001 (Netherlands) Noordwolde (4th) 18pts
- 2002 (Germany) Berghaupten (5th) 19pts
- 2003 (France) La Réole (6th) 16pts
- 2004 (Netherlands) Eenrum (Champion) 19pts
- 2005 Did not compete
- 2006 (France) La Réole (Second) 18pts
- 2007 (England) Folkestone (Champion) 16pts
- 2008 Did not compete
- 2009 (Germany) Berghaupten (6th) 13pts
- 2010 (France) La Réole (Second) 12pts
- 2011 (England) Skegness (10th) 10pts
- 2012 Semi-finalist
- 2013 Did not compete
- 2014 Did not compete
- 2015 Semi-finalist

== Personal life ==
Pijper's son Ace is also a professional speedway rider.
