= 2012 FIM Long Track World Championship =

Motorcycle racing competition

2012 Individual Long Track World Championship

The 2012 Individual Long Track/Grasstrack World Championship was the 42nd edition of the FIM speedway Individual Long Track World Championship.

The world title was won by Joonas Kylmäkorpi of Finland for the third consecutive year.

== Venues ==
Round	Date	Venue
1	9 Jun	(Finland) Forssa
2	16 Jun	(Norway) Forus
3	7 Jul	(Netherlands) Groningen
4	13 Jul	(France) Marmande
5	8 Sep	(France) Morizès
6	15 Sep	(Germany) Vechta

== Final Classification ==
Pos	Rider	Round 1	Round 2	Round 3	Round 4	Round 5	Round 6	Total Pts
1	(Finland) Joonas Kylmäkorpi	28	29	26	25	15	26	149
2	(Germany) Martin Smolinski	13	21	20	25	23	26	128
3	(Czech Republic) Josef Franc	26	8	24	21	27	20	126
4	(Netherlands) Theo Pijper	20	25	24	24	13	18	124
5	(Germany) Jörg Tebbe	26	22	13	6	25	12	104
6	(Australia) Cameron Woodward	13	12	15	13	17	22	92
7	(Germany) Matthias Kröger	9	20	15	12	11	19	86
8	(Germany) Stephan Katt	20	13	14	4	19	7	77
9	(Netherlands) Jannick de Jong	16	13	6	11	15	13	74
10	(England) Glen Phillips	14	9	5	18	13	11	70
11	(Finland) Aki Pekka Mustonen	7	6	23	8	3	6	53
12	(England) Andrew Appleton	14	9	10	20	x	x	53
13	(France) Stephane Tresarrieu	3	3	9	x	17	11	43
14	(Germany) Bernd Diener	5	19	7	3	x	x	34
15	(France) Jerome Lespinasse	0	5	4	15	x	x	24
16	(France) Theo Di Palma	1	4	3	3	8	3	22
17	(Netherlands) Jeffrey Wortman	x	x	x	x	6	10	16
18	(France) Philippe Ostyn	x	x	x	5	3	4	12
19	(Czech Republic) Richard Wolff	x	x	x	x	x	10	10
20	(France) Richard Di Biasi	x	x	x	4	5	x	9
21	(England) David Howe	4	4	x	x	x	x	8
22	(Germany) Enrico Janoschka	x	x	x	x	x	7	7
23	(France) Gabriel Dubernard	x	x	1	3	1	0	5
24	(Netherlands) Mark Stiekema	x	x	5	x	x	x	5
25	(Finland) Rene Lehtinen	5	x	x	x	x	x	5
26	(France) Mathieu Tresarrieu	x	x	x	4	x	x	4
27	(Germany) Herbert Rudolph	x	x	x	x	3	x	3
28	(Norway) Willy Tjissem	x	3	x	x	x	x	3
28	(Finland) Aarni Heikkila	0	x	x	x	x	x	0
28	(Finland) Simo Pulli	0	x	x	x	x	x	0
28	(France) Jeremy Coste Lescoul	x	x	x	0	x	x	0
