= 2002 FIM Long Track World Championship =

Motorcycle racing competition

2002 Individual Long Track World Championship

The 2002 Individual Long Track/Grasstrack World Championship was the 32nd edition of the FIM speedway Individual Long Track World Championship.

The world title was won by Robert Barth of Germany.

== Venues ==
Round	Date	Venue
1	9 Jun	(Germany) Bielefeld
2	23 Jun	(France) Saint-Colomb-de-Lauzun
3	18 Aug	(Germany) Scheeßel
4	1 Sep	(France) Morizès
5	29 Sep	(Germany) Parchim

== Final Classification ==
Pos	Rider	Round 1	Round 2	Round 3	Round 4	Round 5	Total Pts
1	(Germany) Robert Barth	18	25	25	25	20	113
2	(England) Kelvin Tatum	25	20	20	20	11	96
3	(Germany) Gerd Riss	20	14	16	14	25	89
4	(Germany) Matthias Kröger	16	13	14	18	16	77
5	(Netherlands) Theo Pijper	13	11	18	16	14	72
6	(Denmark) Brian Karger	11	16	12	12	13	64
7	(Netherlands) Uppie Bos	14	6	x	8	12	40
8	(England) Paul Hurry	12	10	8	x	10	40
9	(Germany) Ralf Loding	4	9	7	13	7	40
10	(Germany) Stephan Katt	8	8	5	9	9	39
11	(Germany) Daniel Bacher	9	7	13	1	6	36
12	(Netherlands) Maik Groen	7	4	10	11	2	34
13	(France) Stephane Tresarrieu	x	18	3	10	x	31
14	(Germany) Enrico Janoschka	5	12	4	2	4	27
15	(Germany) Sirg Schutzbach	1	X	11	6	8	26
16	(Germany) Bernd Diener	x	x	6	x	18	24
17	(Australia) Shane Parker	2	5	9	4	3	23
18	(Germany) Andre Pollehn	10	x	2	7	x	19
19	(Czech Republic) Zdenek Schneiderwind	6	x	x	3	x	9
20	(England) Glenn Cunningham	3	3	x	x	1	7
21	(Italy) Massimo Mora	x	1	x	5	x	6
22	(Hungary) Csaba Hell	x	x	x	x	5	5
23	(France) Christophe Dubernard	x	2	x	x	x	2
24	(Germany) Maik Ebensing	x	x	1	x	x	1
