= Geißkopf (disambiguation) =

Geißkopf or Geisskopf is the name or part of the name of the following geographic objects:

Mountains and hills (sorted by height):

- Geißkopf (Bregenz Forest Mountains) (1,198 m), in the Bregenz Forest Mountains near Schwarzenberg (Vorarlberg), district of Bregenz, Vorarlberg, Austria
- Geißkopf (1,097.4 m), in the Bavarian Forest near Bischofsmais, county of Regen, Bavaria, Germany
- Geißkopf (Northern Black Forest) (1,085.5 m), in the Black Forest near Seebach (Baden), Ortenaukreis, Baden-Württemberg, Germany
- Geißkopf (Central Black Forest) (359 m), in the Black Forest near Berghaupten, Ortenaukreis, Baden-Württemberg, Germany

Former settlement in Germany:

- Hofruine Geisskopf, ruined forest farming settlement near Iggelbach (Elmstein), county of Bad Dürkheim, Rhineland-Palatinate
