= 2007 FIM Long Track World Championship =

Motorcycle racing competition

2007 Individual Long Track World Championship

The 2007 Individual Long Track/Grasstrack World Championship was the 37th edition of the FIM speedway Individual Long Track World Championship.

The world title was won by Gerd Riss of Germany for the sixth time.

== Venues ==
Round	Date	Venue
1	10 Jun	(Germany) Pfarrkirchen
2	29 Jun	(France) Saint-Macaire
3	13 Jul	(France) Marmande

== Final Classification ==
Pos	Rider	Round 1	Round 2	Round 3	Total Pts
1	(Germany) Gerd Riss	20	13	20	53
2	(Finland) Joonas Kylmäkorpi	10	20	18	48
3	(France) Mathieu Tresarrieu	12	5	25	42
4	(Germany) Stephan Katt	11	25	6	42
5	(England) Andrew Appleton	9	16	16	41
6	(Germany) Enrico Janoschka	14	14	10	38
7	(Netherlands) Theo Pijper	18	10	8	36
8	(Germany) Sirg Schutzback	25	8	3	36
9	(Germany) Bernd Diener	16	4	14	34
10	(Netherlands) Dirk Fabriek	8	11	13	32
11	(Netherlands) Jannick de Jong	4	12	12	28
12	(England) Paul Hurry	x	18	4	22
13	(Germany) Matthias Kröger	7	7	7	21
14	(Czech Republic) Zdenek Schneiderwind	5	9	5	19
15	(France) Stephane Tresarrieu	1	6	11	18
16	(Germany) Jörg Tebbe	13	1	x	14
17	(England) Glen Phillips	2	x	9	11
18	(Germany) Herbert Rudolph	6	0	x	6
19	(France) Christophe Dubernard	x	2	2	4
20	(Germany) Daniel Bacher	3	x	x	3
21	(Netherlands) Rene van Weele	x	3	x	3
22	(Germany) Paul Bauer	x	x	1	1
