= 2006 FIM Long Track World Championship =

Motorcycle racing competition

2006 Individual Long Track World Championship

The 2006 Individual Long Track/Grasstrack World Championship was the 36th edition of the FIM speedway Individual Long Track World Championship.

The world title was won by Robert Barth of Germany for the fourth time.

== Venues ==
Round	Date	Venue
1	24 Jun	(France) Saint-Macaire
2	2 Sep	(France) Morizès
3	16 Sep	(Germany) Vechta

== Final Classification ==
Pos	Rider	Round 1	Round 2	Round 3	Total Pts
1	(Germany) Robert Barth	25	25	25	75
2	(Finland) Joonas Kylmäkorpi	20	20	18	58
3	(Germany) Gerd Riss	16	18	16	50
4	(Netherlands) Theo Pijper	12	16	20	48
5	(France) Mathieu Tresarrieu	18	14	14	46
6	(France) Stephane Tresarrieu	9	13	12	34
7	(England) Glen Phillips	14	12	7	33
8	(Germany) Jörg Tebbe	7	9	9	25
9	(Czech Republic) Zdenek Schneiderwind	13	6	6	25
10	(Germany) Matthias Kröger	10	x	13	23
11	(Germany) Sirg Schutzbach	2	7	11	20
12	(Germany) Herbert Rudolph	1	11	8	20
13	(France) Christophe Dubernard	5	10	5	20
14	(Germany) Bernd Diener	11	3	4	18
15	(Germany) Enrico Janoschka	6	8	X	14
16	(England) Andrew Appleton	8	4	x	12
17	(Netherlands) Jannick de Jong	x	0	10	10
18	(Germany) Otto Niedemeier	4	1	2	7
19	(Netherlands) Erik Eijbergen	x	2	3	5
20	(Norway) Marius Rokeberg	x	5	x	5
21	(Germany) Daniel Bacher	3	x	1	4
22	(France) Sebastien Tresarrieu	x	0	x	0
23	(Germany) Stephan Katt	x	x	0	0
