= 2000 FIM Long Track World Championship =

Motorcycle racing competition

2000 Individual Long Track World Championship

The 2000 Individual Long Track/Grasstrack World Championship was the 30th edition of the FIM speedway Individual Long Track World Championship.

The world title was won by Kelvin Tatum of England.

== Venues ==
Round	Date	Venue
1	23 Jul	(Germany) Jübek
2	6 Aug	(England) Abingdon-on-Thames
3	20 Aug	(Netherlands) Eenrum
4	2 Sep	(France) Morizès
5	1 Oct	(Germany) Harsewinkel

== Final Classification ==
Pos	Rider	Round 1	Round 2	Round 3	Round 4	Round 5	Total Pts
1	(England) Kelvin Tatum	25	7	25	20	25	102
2	(Germany) Robert Barth	12	25	20	25	16	98
3	(Germany) Matthias Kröger	20	16	16	18	20	90
4	(England) Paul Hurry	16	18	18	13	12	77
5	(Germany) Bernd Diener	11	12	14	14	9	60
6	(Czech Republic) Zdeněk Schneiderwind	7	10	10	11	13	51
7	(Czech Republic) Antonín Šváb Jr.	18	13	9	x	10	50
8	(Germany) Herbert Rudolph	10	6	6	12	11	45
9	(Czech Republic) Pavel Ondrašík	4	11	12	8	7	42
10	(Netherlands) Uppie Bos	9	14	13	2	x	38
11	(England) Glenn Cunningham	13	8	5	9	1	36
12	(Germany) Ralf Löding	8	3	2	6	14	33
13	(France) Stéphane Trésarrieu	1	2	11	10	6	30
14	(Netherlands) Theo Pijper	5	4	8	5	8	30
15	(Netherlands) Maik Groen	2	5	7	7	5	26
16	(England) Joe Screen	x	20	x	x	x	20
17	(Germany) Gerd Riss	x	x	x	x	18	18
18	(France) Sébastien Trésarrieu	x	x	x	16	x	16
19	(Norway) Kenneth Borgenhaug	14	1	x	x	x	15
20	(Netherlands) Erik Eibergen	x	x	4	4	4	12
21	(Wales) Tony Atkin	x	9	x	x	x	9
22	(Finland) Joonas Kylmäkorpi	6	x	x	x	x	6
23	(France) Philippe Ostyn	x	x	x	3	x	3
24	(Germany) Stephan Katt	3	x	x	x	x	3
25	(Netherlands) Jim Groen	x	x	3	x	x	3
26	(France) Fabrice Ostyn	0	x	x	x	3	3
27	(Germany) Jörg Tebbe	x	x	x	x	2	2
28	(France) Cyril Thomas	x	x	x	1	x	1
29	(Netherlands) Emiel Groen	x	x	1	x	x	1
