= 2009 FIM Long Track World Championship =

Motorcycle racing competition

2009 Individual Long Track World Championship

The 2009 Individual Long Track/Grasstrack World Championship was the 39th edition of the FIM speedway Individual Long Track World Championship.

The world title was won by Gerd Riss of Germany for the eighth time.

== Venues ==
Round	Date	Venue
1	20 Jun	(Czech Republic) Mariánské Lázně
2	13 Jul	(France) Marmande
3	23 Aug	(Germany) Herxheim
4	5 Sep	(France) Morizès
5	12 Sep	(Germany) Vechta

== Final Classification ==
Pos	Rider	Round 1	Round 2	Round 3	Round 4	Round 5	Total Pts
1	(Germany) Gerd Riss	30	17	30	24	25	126
2	(France) Stephane Tresarrieu	11	17	18	20	17	83
3	(Netherlands) Dirk Fabriek	22	16	9	15	19	81
4	(Germany) Matthias Kröger	19	12	9	20	19	79
5	(England) Glen Phillips	17	11	11	25	12	76
6	(Netherlands) Theo Pijper	19	13	17	16	10	75
7	(Finland) Joonas Kylmäkorpi	14	13	21	7	19	74
8	(France) Mathieu Trésarrieu	6	11	6	26	23	72
9	(Germany) Richard Speiser	x	15	24	16	12	67
10	(Netherlands) Jannick de Jong	12	13	8	9	x	42
11	(Italy) Alessandro Milanese	12	4	5	10	10	41
12	(England) Richard Hall	9	12	5	7	6	39
13	(Germany) Jörg Tebbe	17	0	12	2	7	38
14	(England) Andrew Appleton	14	x	5	4	14	37
15	(Germany) Stephan Katt	x	6	x	10	14	30
16	(Czech Republic) Zdenek Schneiderwind	5	0	10	10	4	29
17	(Germany) Sirg Schutzback	x	x	19	x	x	19
18	(England) Paul Cooper	1	13	x	x	x	14
19	(Czech Republic) Richard Wolff	3	3	7	x	x	13
20	(Germany) Bernd Diener	9	x	3	0	0	12
21	(Finland) Rene Lehtinen	x	x	x	x	7	7
22	(Czech Republic) Pavel Ondrašík	5	x	x	x	x	5
23	(France) Jerome Lespinasse	x	1	x	3	x	4
24	(Germany) Enrico Janoschka	x	x	3	x	1	4
25	(Netherlands) Erik Eijbergen	x	x	x	x	4	4
26	(France) Philippe Ostyn	x	2	x	x	x	2
27	(Germany) Marcel Dachs	x	x	2	x	x	2
28	(England) Shane Colvin	x	x	x	1	x	1
