= Finland national long track team =

National motorcycle racing team

Finland
- Association: Finnish Motorcycling Federation; Suomen Moottoriliitto r.y.
- FIM code: SML
- Team manager: Jouni Seppänen
- Nation Colour: White and Blue

World Championship
Team	0	0	1
Best result	4th placed (2008)
Individual	0	0	0

The Finland national long track team is the national long track motorcycle racing team of Finland and is controlled by the Finnish Motorcycling Federation (SML). The team was started in all editions of Team Long Track World Championship, but they never won a championship medal.

== Competition ==
Team Long Track World Championship
Year & venue	Pts.	Riders	
2007 Morizès	6	22	Rene Lehtinen (13), Mikko Rahko (8), Markus Helin (1)
2008 Werlte	4	36	Rene Lehtinen (16), Kaj Laukkanen (12), Aki-Pekka Mustonen (7), Jan-Eric Korkemaki (1)
2009 Eenrum	6	38	Joonas Kylmäkorpi (17), Kaj Laukkanen (15), Aki-Pekka Mustonen (5), Rene Lehtinen (1)
2010 Morizès			

=== Riders ===
Riders who started in Team Long Track World Championship Finals:

- Markus Helin (2007)
- Jan-Eric Korkemaki (2008)
- Joonas Kylmäkorpi (2009)
- Kaj Laukkanen (2008, 2009)
- Rene Lehtinen (2007, 2008, 2009)
- Aki-Pekka Mustonen (2008, 2009)
- Mikko Rahko (2007)

== See also ==
- Finland national speedway team
