= 2005 FIM Long Track World Championship =

Motorcycle racing competition

2005 Individual Long Track World Championship

The 2005 Individual Long Track/Grasstrack World Championship was the 35th edition of the FIM speedway Individual Long Track World Championship.

The world title was won by Robert Barth of Germany for the third time.

== Venues ==
Round	Date	Venue
1	26 Jun	(Germany) Mühldorf
2	13 Jul	(France) Marmande
3	21 Aug	(Germany) Parchim
4	3 Sep	(France) Morizès
5	3 Nov	(New Zealand) New Plymouth (Cancelled)

== Final Classification ==
Pos	Rider	Round 1	Round 2	Round 3	Round 4	Total Pts
1	(Germany) Robert Barth	20	25	18	20	83
2	(Germany) Gerd Riss	25	11	25	14	75
3	(England) Paul Hurry	8	20	12	18	58
4	(Finland) Joonas Kylmäkorpi	12	18	11	12	53
5	(Czech Republic) Antonín Šváb Jr.	1	13	6	25	45
6	(Germany) Matthias Kröger	3	12	14	13	42
7	(Netherlands) Theo Pijper	18	x	16	6	40
8	(Germany) Enrico Janoschka	4	16	8	8	36
9	(Germany) Stephan Katt	11	x	13	10	34
10	(England) Andrew Appleton	13	10	7	4	34
11	(England) Kelvin Tatum	14	x	20	x	34
12	(Netherlands) Jannick de Jong	9	9	4	9	31
13	(Germany) Bernd Diener	7	4	9	7	27
14	(Germany) Herbert Rudolph	6	5	3	11	25
15	(Germany) Jörg Tebbe	x	8	10	3	21
16	(Germany) Daniel Bacher	16	3	x	x	19
17	(Italy) Massimo Mora	10	6	1	1	18
18	(Germany) Sirg Schutzbach	5	2	5	5	17
19	(France) Mathieu Trésarrieu	x	x	x	16	16
20	(France) Stephane Tresarrieu	x	14	x	x	14
21	(France) Philipe Ostyn	x	7	x	X	7
22	(France) Christophe Dubernard	x	x	x	2	2
23	(Germany) Markus Eibl	x	x	2	x	2
24	(Germany) Hans-Jorg Muller	2	x	x	x	2
25	(Netherlands) Dirk Fabriek	x	1	x	x	1
