= 1999 FIM Long Track World Championship =

Motorcycle racing competition

1999 Individual Long Track World Championship

The 1999 Individual Long Track/Grasstrack World Championship was the 29th edition of the FIM speedway Individual Long Track World Championship.

The world title was won by Gerd Riss of Germany.

== Venues ==
Round	Date	Venue
1	4 Jul	(Germany) Jübek
2	13 Jul	(France) Marmande
3	22 Aug	(Netherlands) Eenrum
4	5 Sep	(Germany) Berghaupten
5	26 Sep	(Germany) Mühldorf

== Final Classification ==
Pos	Rider	Round 1	Round 2	Round 3	Round 4	Round 5	Total Pts
1	(Germany) Gerd Riss	25	20	20	25	25	115
2	(Germany) Robert Barth	9	12	18	20	20	79
3	(England) Kelvin Tatum	20	16	25	18	x	79
4	(England) Steve Schofield	18	18	12	10	18	76
5	(England) Paul Hurry	10	25	10	11	16	72
6	(Czech Republic) Zdenek Schneiderwind	5	13	13	14	12	57
7	(Germany) Bernd Diener	6	10	14	16	10	56
8	(Germany) Andre Pollehn	12	8	8	13	14	55
9	(Germany) Matthias Kröger	8	11	16	8	7	50
10	(England) Glenn Cunningham	13	14	6	9	5	47
11	(England) Jeremy Doncaster	11	7	11	12	1	42
12	(Germany) Ralf Loding	16	5	4	1	13	39
13	(Australia) Shane Parker	7	4	3	x	11	25
14	(Netherlands) Theo Pijper	14	9	x	x	x	23
15	(Netherlands) Maik Groen	4	1	9	6	3	23
16	(England) Mitch Godden	x	3	2	4	9	18
17	(Netherlands) Maik Edensing	3	2	1	2	8	16
18	(Finland) Mikko Rahko	2	0	5	5	2	14
19	(New Zealand) Jason Bunyan	1	6	x	x	x	7
20	(Netherlands) Uppie Bos	x	x	7	x	x	7
21	(Germany) Herbert Rudolph	x	x	x	7	x	7
22	(Czech Republic) Jaroslav Ptak	x	x	x	x	6	6
23	(Czech Republic) Josef Franc	x	x	x	x	4	4
24	(Germany) Sirg Schutzbach	x	x	x	3	x	3
