= 2001 FIM Long Track World Championship =

Motorcycle racing competition

2001 Individual Long Track World Championship

The 2001 Individual Long Track/Grasstrack World Championship was the 31st edition of the FIM speedway Individual Long Track World Championship.

The world title was won by Gerd Riss of Germany for the fourth time.

== Venues ==
Round	Date	Venue
1	8 Jul	(Germany) Parchim
2	19 Aug	(England) Tonbridge
3	26 Aug	(Germany) Herxheim
4	1 Sep	(France) Morizès

== Final Classification ==
Pos	Rider	Round 1	Round 2	Round 3	Round 4	Total Pts
1	(Germany) Gerd Riss	25	25	25	20	95
2	(England) Kelvin Tatum	20	18	13	25	76
3	(Germany) Robert Barth	12	20	20	18	70
4	(England) Paul Hurry	16	14	5	11	46
5	(France) Stephane Tresarrieu	4	12	16	14	46
6	(Netherlands) Theo Pijper	11	10	8	16	45
7	(Germany) Bernd Diener	18	2	12	13	45
8	(Germany) Daniel Bacher	13	13	18	x	44
9	(Australia) Craig Watson	7	9	9	12	37
10	(Germany) Enrico Janoschka	9	8	11	8	36
11	(Netherlands) Uppie Bos	14	5	2	9	30
12	(Germany) Jörg Tebbe	8	16	4	1	29
13	(England) Glenn Cunningham	5	11	7	6	29
14	(Germany) Herbert Rudolph	6	7	14	x	27
15	(Czech Republic) Zdenek Schneiderwind	2	6	10	5	23
16	(Germany) Stephan Katt	10	3	1	7	21
17	(Netherlands) Maik Groen	3	4	6	4	17
18	(Germany) Matthias Kröger	x	x	x	10	10
19	(France) Christophe Dubernard	1	1	3	3	8
20	(France) Sebastien Tresarrieu	x	x	x	2	2
