= 2002 Speedway World Cup Event 1 =

Information
- Date: 4 August 2002
- City: Sheffield
- Event: 1 of 5 (6)

Stadium details
- Stadium: Sheffield Sports Stadium

SWC Results
Winner		Australia - 46 pts
Runner-up		Great Britain - 42 pts
3rd place		Czech Republic - 28 pts
4th place		Germany - 9 pts

The 2002 Speedway World Cup Event 1 was the first race of the 2002 Speedway World Cup season. It took place on August 4, 2002 in the Sheffield Sports Stadium in Sheffield, Great Britain.

== Results ==
Pos.	National team	Pts.
1	Australia	46
2	Great Britain	42
3	Czech Republic	28
4	Germany	9

== Heat details ==
Placing	Team / Rider name	Total	1	2	3	4	5	6	7	8	9	10	11	12	13	14	15	16	17	18	19	20	Pts	21	22	23	24
1	Australia	46	1	3	6	7	10	10	12	14	16	19	20	22	23	26	29	31	37	40	43	46		46	46	46	46
1	(1) Ryan Sullivan	15				1					2					3			6J		3		15
1	(2) Jason Crump	9			3					2					1					3			9
1	(3) Leigh Adams	8		2					2					2				2					8
1	(4) Jason Lyons	2	1					0					1						-				2
1	(5) Todd Wiltshire	12					3					3					3					3	12
2	Great Britain	42	2	5	7	9	11	12	15	18	21	22	25	28	31	33	35	38	40	41	41	42		42	42	42	42
2	(1) Mark Loram	8	2						3						3						0		8
2	(2) Gary Havelock	7		3				1								2				1			7
2	(3) Lee Richardson	10				2				3				3					2				10
2	(4) Joe Screen	11			2						3		3					3					11
2	(5) Sean Wilson	6					2					1					2					1	6
3	Czech Republic	28	3	3	4	7	8	11	12	13	14	16	16	17	17	18	19	19	20	24	26	28		28	28	28	28
3	(1) Lukáš Dryml	7			1			3						1							2		7
3	(2) Bohumil Brhel	8				3			1				0							4J			8
3	(3) Tomáš Topinka	2		0							1				0				1				2
3	(4) Aleš Dryml, Jr.	5	3							1						1		0					5
3	(5) Antonín Kasper, Jr.	6					1					2					1					2	6
4	Germany	9	0	1	1	1	1	3	3	3	3	3	5	5	7	7	7	8	8	8	9	9		9	9	9	9
4	(1) Robert Barth	4		1						0			2						0		1		4
4	(2) Matthias Kröger	0	0								0			0						0			0
4	(3) Joachim Kugelmann	0			0				0							0			-				0
4	(4) Robbie Kessler	5				0		2							2			1				X	5
4	(5) Steffen Mell	0					0					0					0					-	0
Placing	Team / Rider name	Total	1	2	3	4	5	6	7	8	9	10	11	12	13	14	15	16	17	18	19	20	Pts	21	22	23	24

M - exclusion for exceeding two minute time allowance • T - exclusion for touching the tapes • X - other exclusion • E - retired or mechanical failure • F - fell

Helmet colours were permanent for each team (red, blue, white and yellow/black). Colours in tables show gate positions:
gate A – inside	gate B	gate C	gate D – outside

== See also ==
- 2002 Speedway World Cup
- motorcycle speedway
