= 2004 FIM Long Track World Championship =

Motorcycle racing competition

2004 Individual Long Track World Championship

The 2004 Individual Long Track/Grasstrack World Championship was the 34th edition of the FIM speedway Individual Long Track World Championship.

The world title was won by Gerd Riss of Germany for the fifth time.

== Venues ==
Round	Date	Venue
1	12 Jun	(Germany) Bielefeld
2	13 Jul	(France) Marmande
3	28 Aug	(Germany) Pfarrkirchen
4	4 Sep	(France) Morizès
5	6 Nov	(New Zealand) New Plymouth

== Final Classification ==
Pos	Rider	Round 1	Round 2	Round 3	Round 4	Round 5	Total Pts
1	(Germany) Gerd Riss	25	13	20	20	25	103
2	(England) Kelvin Tatum	13	25	25	25	13	101
3	(Germany) Bernd Diener	14	18	16	14	9	71
4	(Germany) Enrico Janoschka	18	16	7	13	11	65
5	(Netherlands) Theo Pijper	16	10	11	6	20	63
6	(England) Andrew Appleton	12	12	9	12	14	59
7	(Germany) Herbert Rudolph	10	8	14	10	6	48
8	(Czech Republic) Zdenek Schneiderwind	11	20	6	7.5	x	44.5
9	(Germany) Stephan Katt	x	7	13	16	7	43
10	(Germany) Matthias Kröger	20	x	x	4	18	42
11	(Netherlands) Maik Groen	6	4	10	11	8	39
12	(Germany) Robert Barth	x	x	18	18	x	36
13	(Germany) Jörg Tebbe	8	9	x	x	16	33
14	(Italy) Massimo Mora	7	11	2	1.5	10	31.5
15	(England) Matt Read	9	6	12	1.5	x	28.5
16	(France) Stephane Tresarrieu	3	14	1	5	4	27
17	(England) Glen Phillips	x	5	5	9	3	22
18	(Germany) Sirg Schutzbach	5	x	8	0	x	13
19	(Netherlands) Uppie Bos	1	x	4	7.5	x	12.5
20	(Australia) Jason Crump	x	x	x	x	12	12
21	(Netherlands) Dirk Fabriek	2	2	3	3	x	10
22	(Australia) Troy Batchelor	x	x	x	x	5	5
23	(Germany) Christian Hulshorst	4	x	x	x	x	4
24	(England) Richard Hall	x	3	x	x	x	3
25	(Australia) Strider Horton	x	x	x	x	2	2
26	(Denmark) John Jørgensen	x	x	x	x	1	1
27	(France) Philippe Ostyn	x	1	x	x	x	1
