= Château des Quat'Sos =

French castle

- La Réole, Gironde, France
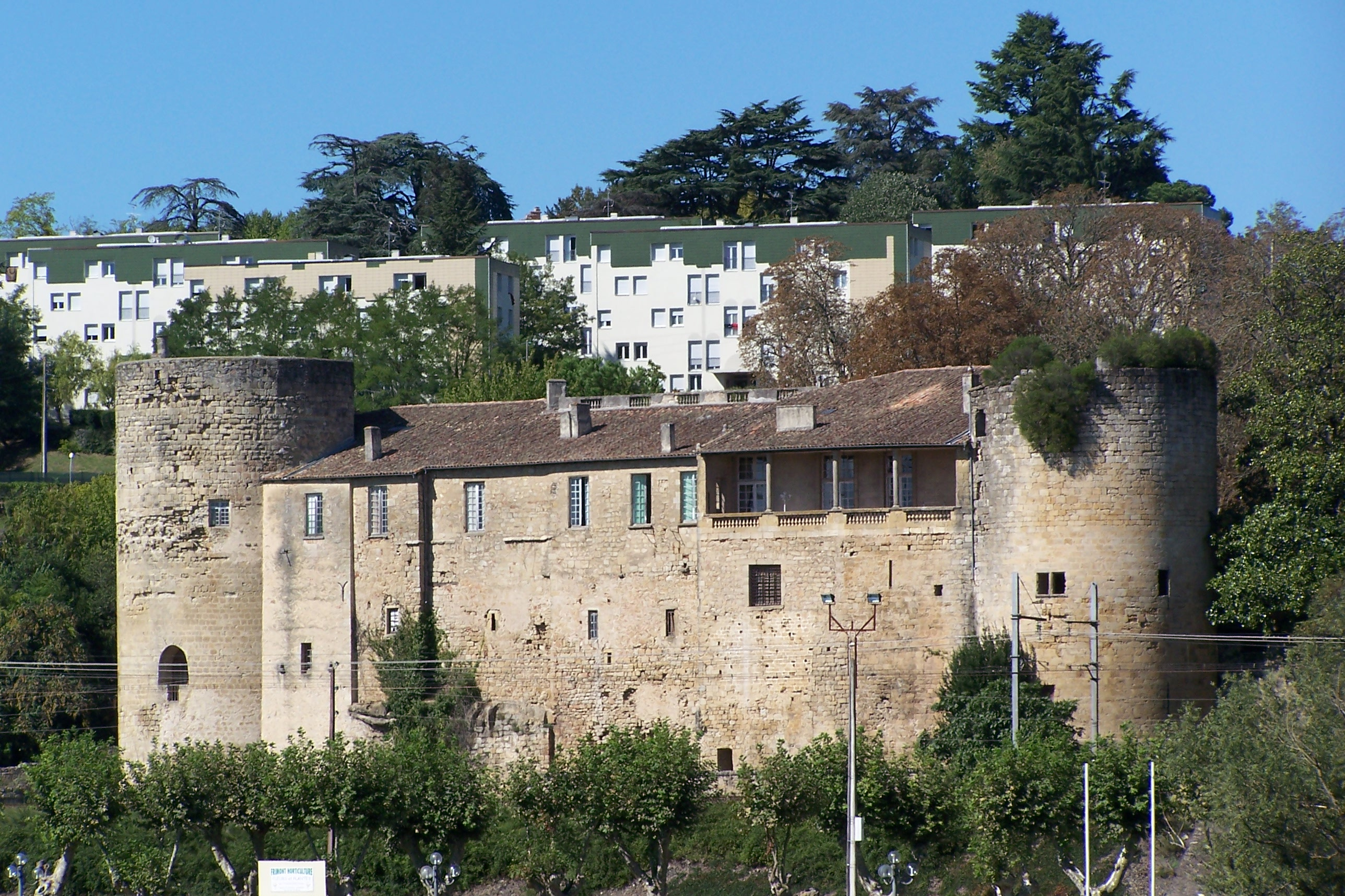
- Château des Quat'Sos in 2011.

Location
- Coordinates: 44°34′53″N 0°02′36″W

Site history
- Built: 13th century

The Château des Quat'Sos is a château in La Réole, Gironde, Nouvelle-Aquitaine, France. The name is of Gascon origin, describing the identical appearance of the four corner towers, the "Four Sisters". The castle is located on the promontory overlooking the confluence of the Garonne and the tributary Charros.

In 1224, permission was granted by King Louis VIII of France to build a castle. The castle was completed by King Henry III of England, while Duke of Aquitaine, to defend the English Duchy of Gascony. During the Hundred Years' War, the castle was fiercely disputed between the English and the French.
