= 1998 FIM Long Track World Championship =

Motorcycle racing competition

1998 Individual Long Track World Championship

The 1998 Individual Long Track/Grasstrack World Championship was the 28th edition of the FIM speedway Individual Long Track World Championship.

The world title was won by Kelvin Tatum of England.

== Venues ==
Round	Date	Venue
1	4 Jul	(Netherlands) Aduard
2	13 Jul	(France) Marmande
3	19 Jul	(England) Abingdon-on-Thames
4	6 Sep	(Germany) Scheeßel
5	27 Sep	(Germany) Mühldorf

== Final Classification ==
Pos	Rider	Round 1	Round 2	Round 3	Round 4	Round 5	Total Pts
1	(England) Kelvin Tatum	25	16	25	25	13	104
2	(Germany) Robert Barth	18	25	16	14	20	93
3	(England) Steve Schofield	16	20	18	13	18	85
4	(Germany) Gerd Riss	13	1	x	20	25	59
5	(Czech Republic) Antonín Šváb Jr.	20	4	14	8	11	57
6	(Germany) Matthias Kröger	12	12	9	12	12	57
7	(England) Glenn Cunningham	5	18	12	18	x	53
8	(England) Simon Cross	14	13	13	5	x	45
9	(Italy) Massimo Mora	10	10	8	9	5	42
10	(England) Simon Wigg	7	6	11	x	16	40
11	(Czech Republic) Zdenek Schneiderwind	6	14	6	3	10	39
12	(Germany) Bernd Diener	8	x	7	16	7	38
13	(Netherlands) Uppie Bos	9	x	5	11	8	33
14	(Australia) Shane Parker	0	9	10	2	9	30
15	(Germany) Ralf Loding	4	5	3	6	4	22
16	(England) Paul Hurry	x	x	20	x	x	20
17	(Netherlands) Maik Groen	11	3	1	x	1	16
18	(Germany) Detlaf Conradi	1	2	x	7	6	16
19	(France) Christophe Dubernard	x	8	4	1	2	15
20	(Germany) Herbert Rudolph	x	x	x	x	14	14
21	(France) Philippe Bergé	x	11	x	x	x	11
22	(Germany) Gunther Bunning	x	x	x	10	x	10
23	(France) Stéphane Trésarrieu	x	7	x	x	x	7
24	(Germany) Heiko Muller	x	x	x	4	x	4
25	(Netherlands) Theo Pijper	3	x	x	x	x	3
26	(Germany) Otto Niedermeier	x	x	x	x	3	3
27	(Netherlands) Steven van der Helm	2	x	x	x	x	2
28	(England) Colin Earl	x	x	2	x	x	2
