= Geißkopf (Central Black Forest) =

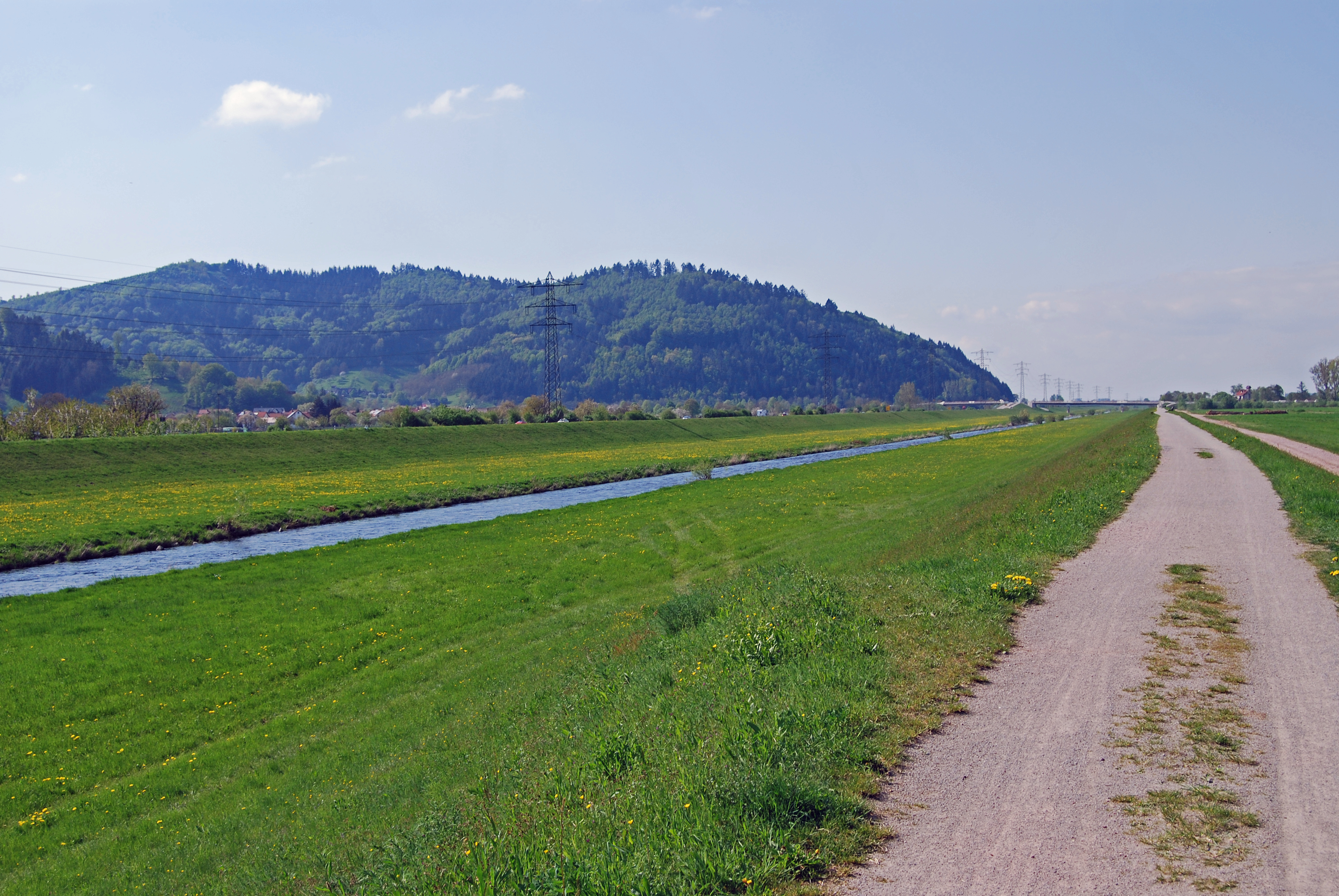
- The Geißkopf (c) seen from Gengenbach

Highest point
- Elevation: 359 m above sea level (NHN) (1,178 ft)
- Coordinates: 48°25′3.46″N 07°58′28.65″E

Geography
- Location within Baden-Württemberg
- Location: Baden-Württemberg
- Parent range: Black Forest

The Geißkopf is a foothill, 359 m above sea level (NHN), near Berghaupten in the south German state of Baden-Württemberg. During the Migration Period there was evidently a Roman or Germanic military camp on the strategically placed heights.

== Location and area ==
The Geißkopf stands at the exit of the Kinzig valley on the Rhine Plain and rises above it by around 200 metres. It forms the northeastern end of the Bellenwald. Nearby villages are Berghaupten to the southeast, Ohlsbach to the northeast and Zunsweier to the northwest. The hill is covered by mixed woods and accessible to just below the summit by a road and forest tracks

== History ==
An area of about 100 to 150 metres, part of which is level, provided a good site for a settlement in former times, something which was exploited because of its strategically advantageous location. To the east, north and south, the hillsides descend relatively steeply, while to the west a saddle about 25 metres deep connects it to the edge of the Black Forest. There are no remains of a bank or ditch on the ground, but some stray archaeological finds of military belts dating to Late Antiquity that have found since 1989, prove that the Geißkopf was populated in the 4th and 5th centuries A.D. A small part of the rounded hilltop was then archaeologically examined, although no obvious building remains were found. However, a phosphorus analysis of the soil showed that the mountain was either used intensively for an extended period of time or at least temporarily housed a large number of people and their animals. More than 1,300 iron or bronze objects spread evenly over the entire surface, reveal an intensive use of the area. Numerous weapons, such as lance tips, axes, arrow and bolt tips, as well as late Roman military belt parts, and various Germanic and Roman fibulae were found. Some of the lancet tips have been bent, suggesting that they had been fighting. Various tools, such as those used in woodworking or forging, were also found in large numbers amongst the excavated material. It is noticeable that in contrast, hardly any pottery was uncovered and there was virtually no women's jewelry. Thus, in contrast to the opposing Kügeleskopf (north of the Kinzig), it seems to have acted purely as a military camp.

== Literature ==
- Heiko Steuer und Michael Hoeper: Völkerwanderungszeitliche Höhenstationen am Schwarzwaldrand. Eine Zusammenfassung der Gemeinsamkeiten und Unterschiede. In: Heiko Steuer, Volker Bierbrauer (eds.): Höhensiedlungen zwischen Antike und Mittelalter von den Ardennen bis zur Adria. Unter Mitarbeit von Michael Hoeper. de Gruyter, Berlin etc., 2008, ISBN 978-3-11-020235-9, (Reallexikon der Germanischen Altertumskunde Ergänzungsbände 58).
