= 2003 FIM Long Track World Championship =

Motorcycle racing competition

2003 Individual Long Track World Championship

The 2003 Individual Long Track/Grasstrack World Championship was the 33rd edition of the FIM speedway Individual Long Track World Championship.

The world title was won by Robert Barth of Germany for the second time.

== Venues ==
Round	Date	Venue
1	15 Jun	(Germany) Bielefeld
2	29 Jun	(Germany) Mühldorf
3	13 Jul	(France) Marmande
4	24 Aug	(England) Tonbridge
5	6 Sep	(France) Morizès
6	1 Nov	(New Zealand) New Plymouth

== Final Classification ==
Pos	Rider	Round 1	Round 2	Round 3	Round 4	Round 5	Round 6	Total Pts
1	(Germany) Robert Barth	25	25	18	20	25	18	131
2	(England) Kelvin Tatum	20	7	25	25	18	25	120
3	(Germany) Gerd Riss	18	18	10	18	14	20	98
4	(Germany) Matthias Kröger	16	4	14	14	20	14	82
5	(Czech Republic) Zdenek Schneiderwind	7	13	16	12	9	8	65
6	(Netherlands) Theo Pijper	13	10	12	9	16	4	64
7	(Germany) Bernd Diener	14	8	13	7	5	11	58
8	(England) Paul Hurry	11	14	20	13	x	x	58
9	(Germany) Ralf Loding	3	20	6	6	7	12	54
10	(Netherlands) Uppie Bos	10	5	11	1	10	16	53
11	(Denmark) Brian Karger	5	12	7	11	11	7	53
12	(Germany) Enrico Janoschka	12	6	9	4	13	5	49
13	(France) Stephane Tresarrieu	2	x	4	16	12	10	44
14	(Netherlands) Maik Groen	8	3	5	8	1	9	34
15	(Germany) Stephan Katt	9	2	x	10	3	x	24
16	(Czech Republic) Antonín Šváb Jr.	1	11	3	0	8	x	23
17	(Germany) Herbert Rudolph	x	16	x	x	6	x	22
18	(England) Andrew Appleton	x	1	8	5	4	x	18
19	(Germany) Sirg Schutzbach	4	9	1	2	x	x	16
20	(England) Oliver Allen	x	x	x	x	x	13	13
21	(New Zealand) Mitch Shirra	x	x	x	x	x	6	6
22	(Hungary) Csaba Hell	6	x	x	x	x	x	6
23	(Australia) Shane Parker	x	x	x	3	x	x	3
24	(France) Christophe Dubernard	x	x	x	2	x	2	4
25	(Australia) Chris Watson	x	x	x	x	x	3	3
26	(New Zealand) Sam Taylor	x	x	x	x	x	2	2
27	(Australia) Craig Watson	x	x	x	x	x	1	1
