= 2011 FIM Long Track World Championship =

Motorcycle racing competition

2011 Individual Long Track World Championship

The 2011 Individual Long Track/Grasstrack World Championship was the 41st edition of the FIM speedway Individual Long Track World Championship.

The world title was won by Joonas Kylmäkorpi of Finland for the second time.

== Venues ==
Round	Date	Venue
1	12 Jun	(Czech Republic) Mariánské Lázně
2	25 Jun	(Norway) Forus
3	9 Jul	(Finland) Forssa
4	13 Jul	(France) Marmande
5	23 Jul	(Netherlands) Groningen
6	10 Sep	(Germany) Vechta
7	17 Sep	(France) Morizès

== Final Classification ==
Pos	Rider	Round 1	Round 2	Round 3	Round 4	Round 5	Round 6	Round 7	Total Pts
1	(Finland) Joonas Kylmäkorpi	15	29	14	22	x	28	19	127
2	(Germany) Richard Speiser	21	20	10	24	x	18	10	103
3	(Germany) Stephan Katt	23	19	5	13	x	21	20	101
4	(Netherlands) Theo Pijper	13	20	9	16	x	14	24	96
5	(France) Mathieu Tresarrieu	15	13	7	21	–	14	20	90
6	(Germany) Martin Smolinski	22	7	3	27	x	17	7	83
7	(France) Stephane Tresarrieu	5	3	2	18	x	21	26	75
8	(Germany) Matthias Kröger	17	9	10	15	x	14	8	73
9	(Germany) Herbert Rudolph	19	14	7	4	x	17	9	70
10	(Netherlands) Dirk Fabrick	7	14	6	6	x	8	18	59
11	(Germany) Jörg Tebbe	17	17	11	2	x	4	7	58
12	(England) Glen Phillips	2	13	11	7	x	13	7	53
13	(Czech Republic) Josef Franc	12	4	8	6	x	14	7	51
14	(England) Richard Hall	2	17	1	14	–	6	10	50
15	(England) Andrew Appleton	11	10	13	8	x	3	3	48
16	(France) Jerome Lespinasse	11	6	2	6	x	2	12	39
17	(Finland) Aki Pekka Mustonen	4	9	8	1	x	5	10	37
18	(France) David Bellego	x	x	x	15	x	x	8	23
19	(Czech Republic) Richard Wolff	6	x	x	x	x	x	x	6
20	(Germany) Daniel Rath	x	x	x	x	x	6	x	6
21	(Finland) Rene Lehtinen	x	x	2	x	x	x	x	2
22	(Czech Republic) Karel Kadlec	0	x	x	x	x	x	x	0
23	(Czech Republic) Pavel Ondrasik	0	x	x	x	x	x	x	0
24	(Norway) Kim Rudi Juritzen	x	0	x	x	x	x	x	0
