= Ohlsbach =

- Municipality
- Coat of arms

- Location of Ohlsbach within Ortenaukreis district
- Interactive map of Ohlsbach
- Location within Germany Location within Baden-Württemberg
- Coordinates: 48°25′58″N 07°59′49″E
- Country: Germany
- State: Baden-Württemberg
- Admin. region: Freiburg
- District: Ortenaukreis

Government
  - Mayor (2020–28): Bernd Bruder

Area
  - Total: 11.14 km^{2} (4.30 sq mi)
- Elevation: 181 m (594 ft)

Population (2025-12-31)
  - Total: 3,356
  - Density: 301.3/km^{2} (780.3/sq mi)
- Time zone: UTC+01:00 (CET)
  - Summer (DST): UTC+02:00 (CEST)
- Postal codes: 77797
- Dialling codes: 07803
- Vehicle registration: OG, BH, KEL, LR, WOL
- Website: www.ohlsbach.de

Ohlsbach (German pronunciation: [ˈoːlsbax]; Low Alemannic: Ohlschbach) is a town in the district of Ortenau in Baden-Württemberg in Germany.
