= Berghaupten =

Municipality in Baden-Württemberg, Germany

- Municipality
- Coat of arms

- Location of Berghaupten within Ortenaukreis district
- Interactive map of Berghaupten
- Location within Germany Location within Baden-Württemberg
- Coordinates: 48°24′25″N 07°59′13″E
- Country: Germany
- State: Baden-Württemberg
- Admin. region: Freiburg
- District: Ortenaukreis

Government
  - Mayor (2017–25): Philipp Clever

Area
  - Total: 9.69 km^{2} (3.74 sq mi)
- Elevation: 172 m (564 ft)

Population (2025-12-31)
  - Total: 2,537
  - Density: 262/km^{2} (678/sq mi)
- Time zone: UTC+01:00 (CET)
  - Summer (DST): UTC+02:00 (CEST)
- Postal codes: 77791
- Dialling codes: 07803
- Vehicle registration: OG, BH, KEL, LR, WOL
- Website: www.berghaupten.de

Berghaupten (Low Alemannic: Berghoupte) is a municipality in the district of Ortenau in Baden-Württemberg in Germany. Furthermore, it is a state-approved resort located in the Black Forest. Neighbouring municipalities are Ohlsbach (in the north), Gengenbach (in the east), Hohberg (in the south – west) as well as Offenburg (in the north-west).

== History ==
On the nearby hill of Geißkopf (359 m) there is evidence of a Roman or Germanic military encampment.

== Sport ==
Motorcycle speedway and grasstrack speedway is held at the Motorrad Grasbahn, approximately 1 kilometre north of the municipality off the Bellenwaldstraße. The club MSC Berghaupten organise race meetings at the site, one of which was the final of the German Individual Speedway Championship in 2013.
