= La Réole =

- Commune
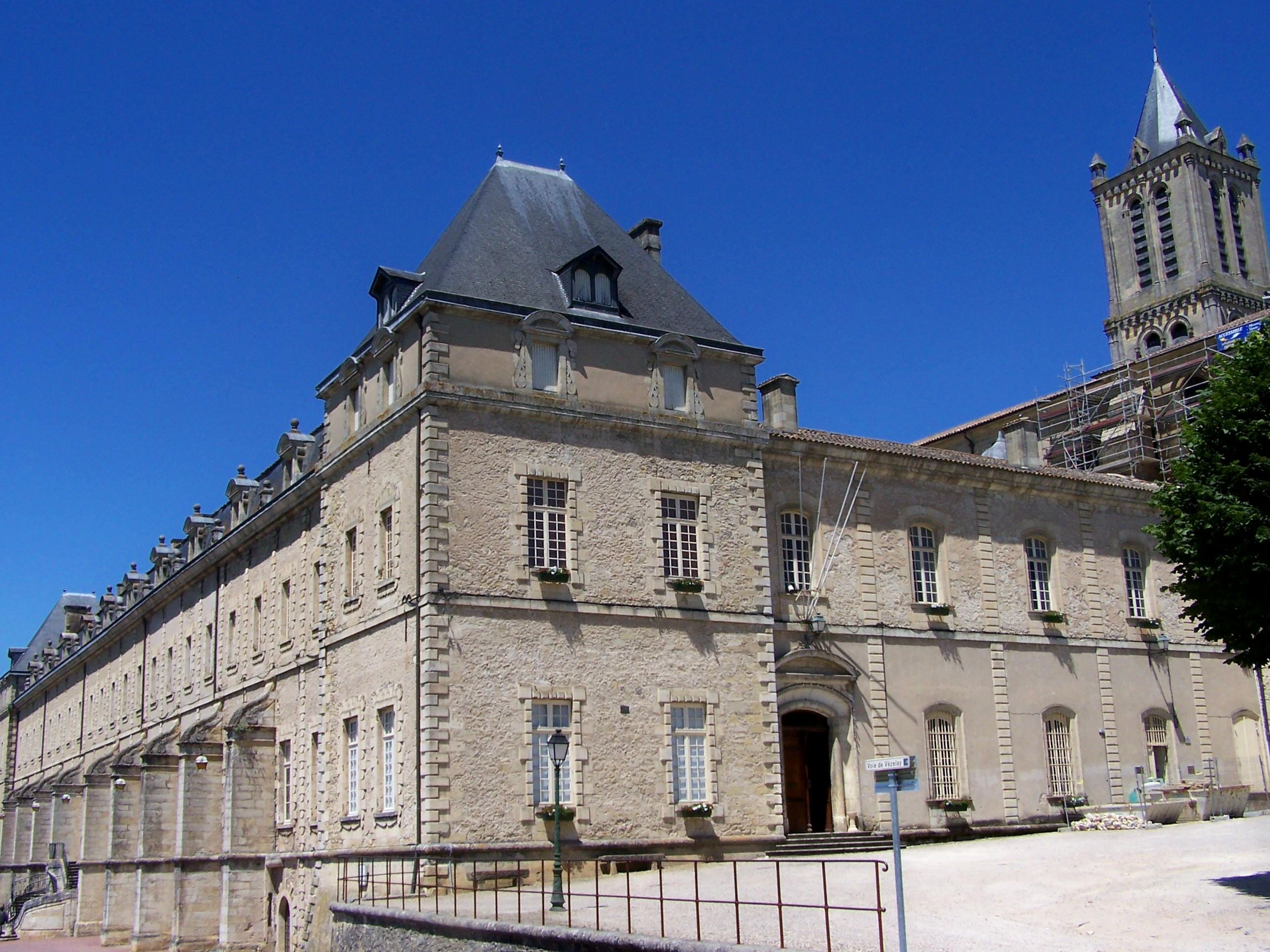
- Town hall

- Coat of arms
- Location of La Réole
- Location within France Location within Nouvelle-Aquitaine
- Coordinates: 44°35′N 0°02′W
- Country: France
- Region: Nouvelle-Aquitaine
- Department: Gironde
- Arrondissement: Langon
- Canton: Le Réolais et Les Bastides
- Intercommunality: Réolais en Sud Gironde

Government
  - Mayor (2020–2026): Bruno Marty
- Area^{1}: 12.53 km^{2} (4.84 sq mi)
- Elevation: 25 m (82 ft)
- Highest elevation: 133 m (436 ft)
- Lowest elevation: 5 m (16 ft)
- Population (2023): 4,487
  - Density: 358.1/km^{2} (927.5/sq mi)
- Time zone: UTC+01:00 (CET)
  - Summer (DST): UTC+02:00 (CEST)
- INSEE/Postal code: 33352 /33190
- ^{1} French Land Register data, which excludes lakes, ponds, glaciers > 1 km^{2} (0.386 sq mi or 247 acres) and river estuaries.

La Réole (French pronunciation: [la ʁeɔl]; Occitan: La Rèula) is a commune in the Gironde department in Nouvelle-Aquitaine in southwestern France.

== Geography ==
La Réole is located on the right (northern) bank of the Garonne River, with the southern part forming the hamlet of Rouergue. The town centre sits on a rocky spur overlooking the river. It lies 61 kilometres (38 mi) southeast of Bordeaux by rail. La Réole station has rail connections to Agen, Langon and Bordeaux.

The municipality covers an area of 1,250 hectares, which is smaller than average for the department of Gironde.

== History ==
There is evidence of a Roman villa, La Pontesa, with an adjoining cemetery which has been dated to be from the 3rd or 4th century. There were other Roman villas nearby. At this time in the region, there were Roman buildings every 1500 metres or so.

Evidence of later dwellings on the La Pontesa site show that it was inhabited between the 7th and 8th centuries. Nineteen sarcophaguses and funeral articles have been found on this site.

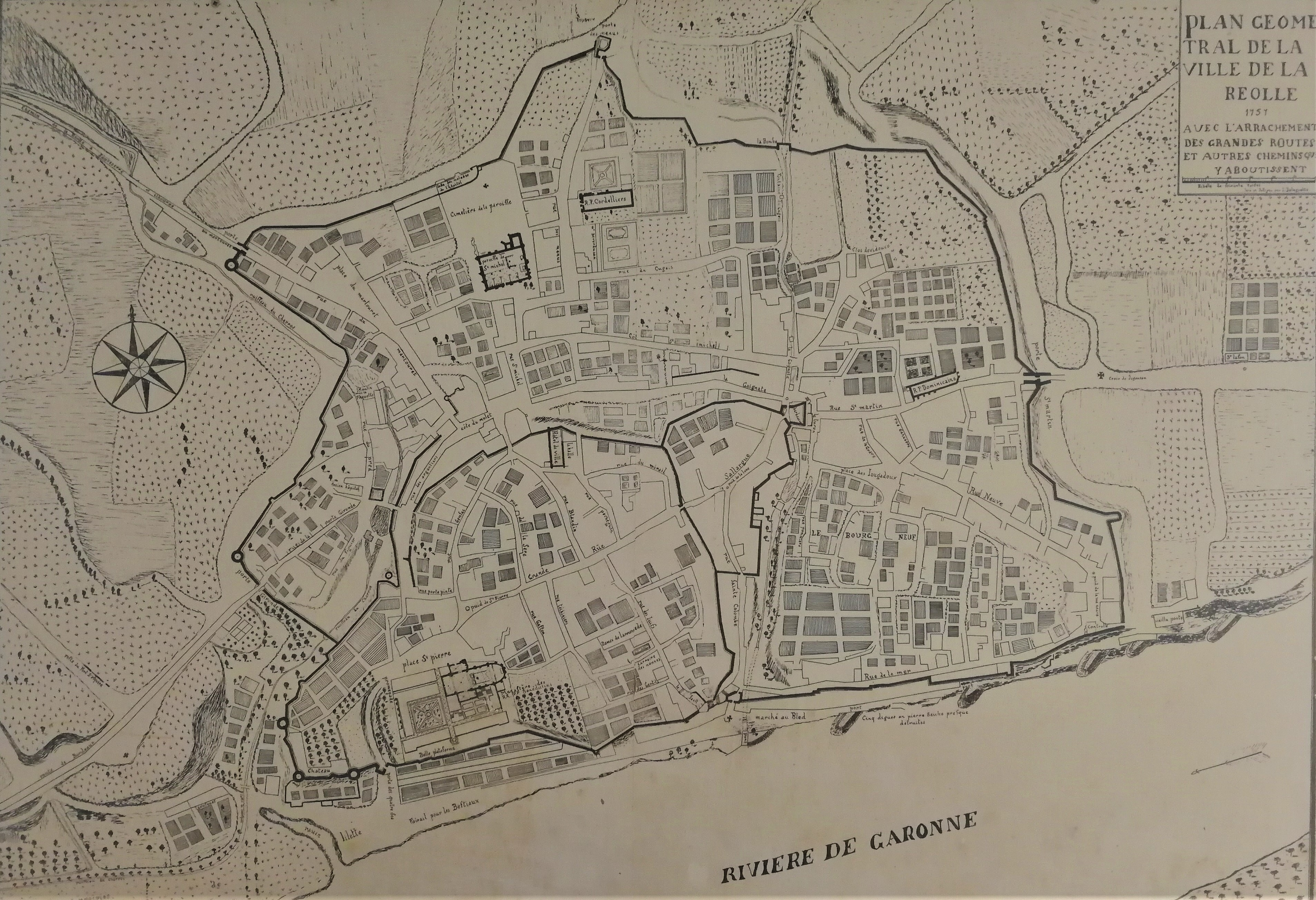
Map of La Réole in 1757

La Réole grew up round a monastery founded in the 7th or 8th century, which was reformed in the 11th century and took the name of Regula, hence that of the town. During the Middle Ages, La Réole was a royal town, administered by six jurats (pre-revolution municipal officers), who were elected by the town's bourgeois. The law was upheld in the name of the King.

During the War of Saint-Sardos in 1324, the most stubborn resistance against the repossession of Aquitaine was put up by the Earl of Kent in La Réole.

For a significant period of time, La Réole was the second most important town of Guyenne, after Bordeaux. Twice during the 17th century in 1678 and 1690, Bordeaux's parliament was exiled to La Réole.

== Population ==
Historical population

Year	Pop.	±% p.a.
1793	5,035	—
1800	3,806	−3.92%
1806	3,648	−0.70%
1821	3,680	+0.06%
1831	3,787	+0.29%
1836	3,931	+0.75%
1841	3,837	−0.48%
1846	4,080	+1.24%
1851	4,080	+0.00%
1856	4,193	+0.55%
1861	4,133	−0.29%
1866	4,244	+0.53%
1872	4,096	−0.59%
1876	4,089	−0.04%
1881	4,156	+0.33%
1886	4,343	+0.88%
1891	4,177	−0.78%
1896	4,271	+0.45%
1901	4,407	+0.63%

Year	Pop.	±% p.a.
1906	4,319	−0.40%
1911	4,241	−0.36%
1921	3,644	−1.51%
1926	3,695	+0.28%
1931	3,714	+0.10%
1936	3,812	+0.52%
1946	4,491	+1.65%
1954	4,651	+0.44%
1962	4,880	+0.60%
1968	4,945	+0.22%
1975	5,016	+0.20%
1982	4,414	−1.81%
1990	4,273	−0.40%
1999	4,187	−0.23%
2007	4,218	+0.09%
2012	4,125	−0.44%
2017	4,356	+1.10%
2023	4,487	+0.50%

Source: EHESS and INSEE (1968-2023)

== Sights ==
The church of St Peter, dating from the end of the 12th century as well as the impressive buildings of the 18th century Benedictine monastery are still both in use. The monastery currently houses a museum, library and the offices of the current town hall. There is also an old town hall building that dates from the 12th and 14th centuries. The town fortifications were dismantled in 1629 by order of Richelieu, but remains dating from the 12th and 14th centuries are to be seen, as well as a part of the Château de Quat'Sos, which was begun by Louis VIII of France and completed by Henry II of England. The south-western tower, called "la Thomasse", still looks over the Garonne river.

Other sites of historical significance in the town include the House of Wine and Art (15th century), the hospital chapel (18th century), Briet's Hotel (17th century) as well as a town centre with cobble streets and houses that date back to the 15th century.

Of more recent note is the suspension bridge that links the town centre to the southern bank of the Garonne river. The architect responsible for its design was Gustave Eiffel, at the time a still little known public servant.

== Economy ==
Historically, according to the Encyclopædia Britannica Eleventh Edition (1911):

The town is the centre of. the district in which the well-known breed of Bazadais cattle is reared. It is an agricultural market and carries on trade in the wine of the region together with liqueur distillery and the manufacture of casks, rope, brooms, etc.

As the 20th century progressed, La Réole played the role of a regional economic centre, second to Bordeaux. More recently, the administrative responsibility has moved to nearby Langon. La Réole now is an important town centre in the Entre deux mers wine region of the Bordeaux classifications and has concentrated on tourism to stimulate the town economy.

== Twin towns ==
La Réole is twinned with:

- Oliveira do Douro, Vila Nova de Gaia, Portugal, since 1992
- Sacile, Italy, since 2000

== Sport ==
La Réole has an International Motorcycle circuit Grasstrack circuit. It has hosted many European Championship meeting as well as the World 1000cc Sidecar Final in 2010.

== See also ==
- Communes of the Gironde department
