= Saint-Colomb-de-Lauzun =

- Commune
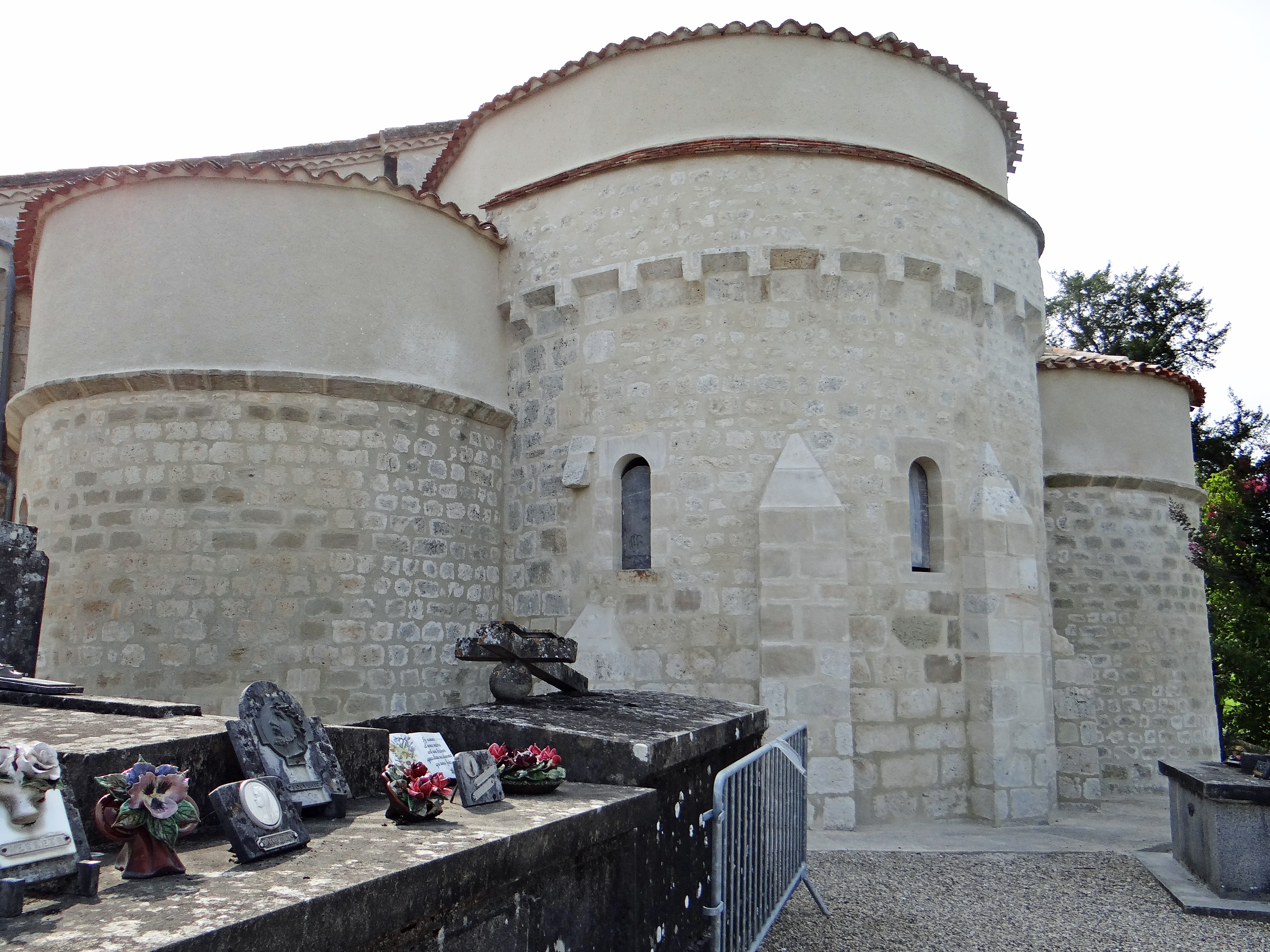
- The church in Saint-Colomb-de-Lauzun
- Location of Saint-Colomb-de-Lauzun
- Location within France Location within Nouvelle-Aquitaine
- Coordinates: 44°36′54″N 0°28′28″E
- Country: France
- Region: Nouvelle-Aquitaine
- Department: Lot-et-Garonne
- Arrondissement: Marmande
- Canton: Le Val du Dropt
- Intercommunality: Pays de Lauzun

Government
  - Mayor (2020–2026): Nicolas Gris
- Area^{1}: 23.19 km^{2} (8.95 sq mi)
- Elevation: 80 m (260 ft)
- Highest elevation: 136 m (446 ft)
- Lowest elevation: 67 m (220 ft)
- Population (2023): 473
  - Density: 20.4/km^{2} (52.8/sq mi)
- Time zone: UTC+01:00 (CET)
  - Summer (DST): UTC+02:00 (CEST)
- INSEE/Postal code: 47235 /47410
- ^{1} French Land Register data, which excludes lakes, ponds, glaciers > 1 km^{2} (0.386 sq mi or 247 acres) and river estuaries.

Saint-Colomb-de-Lauzun (French pronunciation: [sɛ̃ kɔlɔ̃ də lozœ̃], literally Saint-Colomb of Lauzun; Occitan: Sent Colomb de Lausun) is a commune in the Lot-et-Garonne department in south-western France.

== See also ==
- Communes of the Lot-et-Garonne department
