= Rene Lehtinen =

Finnish motorcycle speedway rider (born 1985)

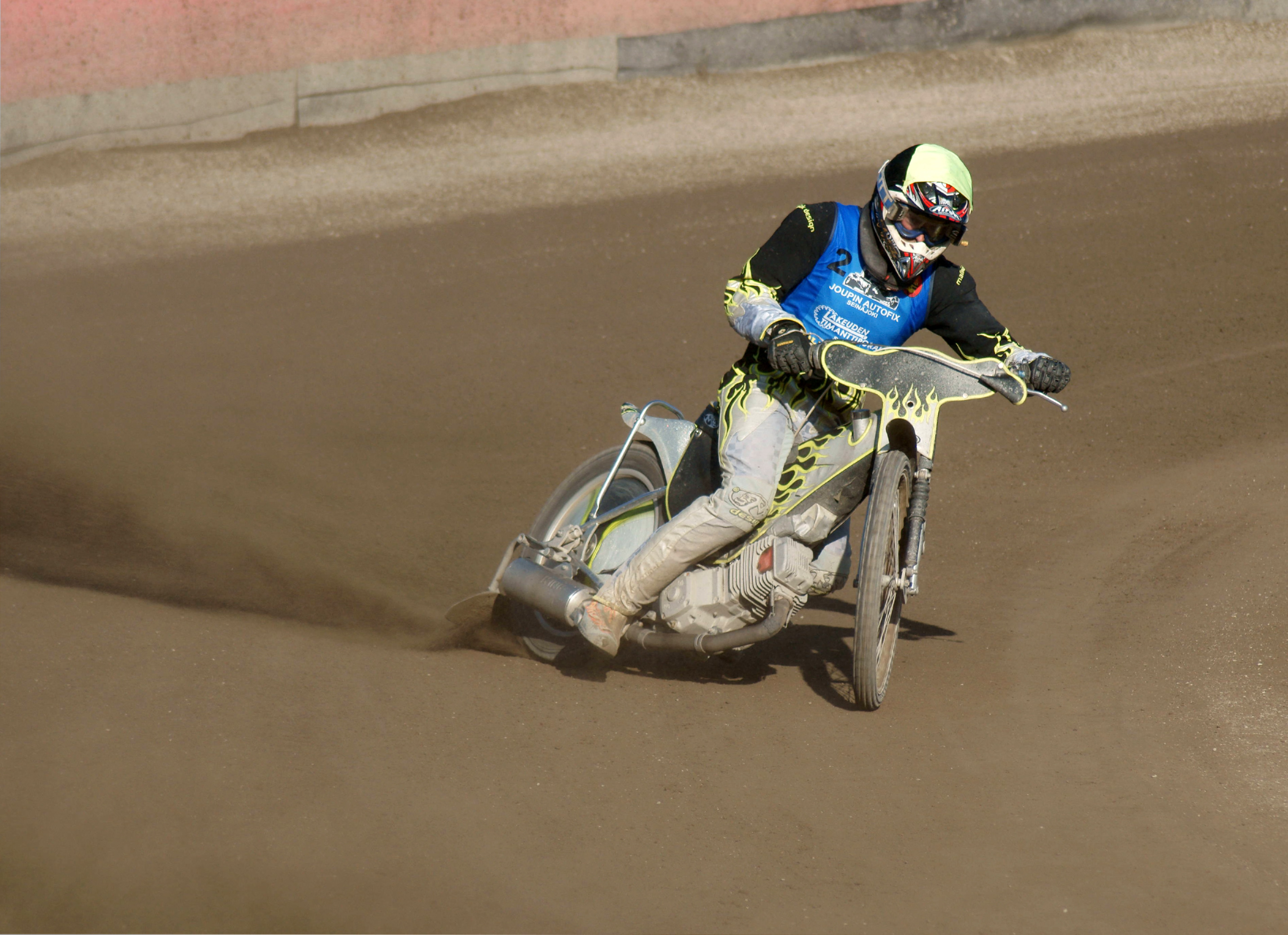
- Lehtinen in action for Kotkat SeMK Seinajoki in 2010
- Born: 27 March 1985 (age 41)
- Nationality: Finnish

Career history

Finland
- 2002: Kojootit HjMK Haapajarvi
- 2003: Hanavalinta HMK Hyvinkaa
- 2004-2011: Kotkat SeMK Seinajoki
- 2010: FMS Forssa

Sweden
- 2002–2004: Team Hagfors
- 2005, 2006, 2008: Solkatterna

Individual honours
- 2007: Finland Long Track champion
- 2007: Nordic Long Track champion

Rene Lehtinen (born 27 March 1985) is a Finnish former motorcycle speedway rider, who was a member of Finland team at 2007 Speedway World Cup.

== Career ==
Lehtinen competed in three World longtrack Grand Prix series in 2009, 2011 and 2012].

In 2007, Lehtinen won the Finland Long Track championship and Nordic Long Track championship.

== Results ==
=== World Championships ===
- Team World Championship (Speedway World Team Cup and Speedway World Cup)
  - 2007 - 8th place (did not start as reserve)
- Team U-21 World Championship
  - 2005 - 4th place in Qualifying Round 3
  - 2006 - 4th place in Qualifying Round 2

== See also ==
- Finland national speedway team

== World Longtrack Championship ==
=== Grand-Prix Years ===
- 2009 – 1 app (21st) 7pts
- 2011 – 1 app (21st) 2pt
- 2012 – 1 app (25th) 5pts

=== Team Championship ===
- 2007 (France) Morizès (6th) 11/18pts (Rode with Mikko Rahko, Markus Helin)
- 2008 (Germany) Werlte (4th) 15/30pts (Rode with Kaj Laukkanen, Aki-Pekka Mustonen, Jan-Eric Korkemaki)
- 2009 (Netherlands) Eenrum (6th) 1/31pts (Rode with Joonas Kylmakorpi, Kaj Laukkanen, Aki Pekka Mustonen)
- 2010 (France) Morizès (5th) 0/24pts (Rode with Joonas Kylmakorpi, Pasi Pulliainen, Aki Pekka Mustonen)
- 2011 (Germany) Scheeßel (6th) 10/26pts (Rode with Simo Pulli, Aki Pekka Mustonen)

== European Grasstrack Championship ==
=== Finals ===
- 2008 (Netherlands) Siddeburen (Third) 16pts

=== Semi-finals ===
- 2006 (Netherlands) Gorredijk (N/S)
- 2007 (Germany) Hertingen (11th) 9pts
- 2009 (Netherlands) Stadskanaal (8th) 10pts
- 2011 (Netherlands) Staphorst (7th) 10pts
- 2013 (Netherlands) Noordwolde (11th) 8pts
