= Joonas Kylmäkorpi =

Finnish former motorcycle speedway rider (born 1980)

- Born: 14 February 1980 (age 46); Stockholm, Sweden
- Nickname: the Flying Finn
- Nationality: Finnish & Swedish

Career history

Sweden
- 1996–1998: Bysarna
- 1999–2000, 2002–2005: Kaparna
- 2001: Rospiggarna
- 2006–2008: Hammarby
- 2010: Västervik
- 2011–2013: Indianerna
- 2014–2015: Dackarna
- 2016: Masarna

Great Britain
- 2001, 2003–2004, 2010–2012, 2014: Eastbourne Eagles
- 2002: Ipswich Witches
- 2005, 2015: Coventry Bees
- 2006–2009: Lakeside Hammers
- 2013: Peterborough Panthers
- 2016: Wolverhampton Wolves

Poland
- 1999, 2006–2007: Gorzów
- 2000: Częstochowa
- 2001, 2008: Ostrów
- 2003: Leszno
- 2005: Lublin
- 2009: Gdańsk
- 2010: Rybnik
- 2012: Rzeszów
- 2013–2016: Daugavpils

Denmark
- 2000: Herning
- 2005: Brovst
- 2010–2011: Esbjerg
- 2015–2016: Region Varde

Individual honours
- 2010, 2011 2012, 2013: Long Track World Champion
- 1991: Swedish U21 champion

Team honours
- 2001, 2003: Swedish Elitserien Champion
- 2009: Elite League KO Cup

Joonas Nikolai Kylmäkorpi (born 14 February 1980) is a Finnish former motorcycle speedway rider and is a four-time Long Track World Champion. He earned 12 caps for the Finland national speedway team.

== Caree r ==
Nicknamed the Flying Finn, Kylmäkorpi represented Finland in the Speedway World Cup and won a bronze medal at the Finnish Individual Speedway Championship in 2002.

However, Kylmäkorpi's real success has come on the longtrack where he won four World Championships in 2010, 2011, 2012 and 2013

Kylmäkorpi rode in the British leagues from 2001 to 2016, starting with Eastbourne Eagles in 2001. At Eastbourne, he replaced fellow Finnish rider Petri Kokko. He finished his British leagues career at Eastbourne as their number one rider in 2012.

== Speedway Grand Prix results ==
2003 Speedway Grand Prix Final Championship standings (Riding No 24) (34)
Race no.	Grand Prix	Pos.	Pts.	Heats	Draw No
6 /9	(Sweden) Scandinavian SGP	22	2	(0,1)	19
9 /9	(Norway) Norwegian SGP	24	1	(1,0)	24

2004 Speedway Grand Prix Final Championship standings (Riding No ?)
Race no.	Grand Prix	Pos.	Pts.	Heats	Draw No
9 /9	(Norway) Norwegian SGP		1		

permanent speedway rider
wild card, track reserve or qualified reserve
rider not classified (track reserve who did not start)

== Speedway honours ==
- Individual World Championship (Speedway Grand Prix):
  - 2003 – 40th place (3 points in 2 events)
  - 2004 – 42nd place (1 points in 1 event)
- Individual U-21 World Championship:
  - 2000 – 12th place (5 points)
- Team World Championship (Speedway World Cup):
  - 2001 – 9th place (7 points in qualifying round 1)
  - 2002 – 8th place (4 points in race-off)
  - 2003 – 7th place (6 points in race-off)
  - 2006 – 7th place (did not start in final tournament – 12 points in qualifying round 1)
  - 2007 – 8th place (6 points in Semi-Final 1)
- 2006 European Pairs Speedway Championship:
  - 2006 – winner of semi-final 2 (10 points in semi-final 2)

== World Longtrack Championship ==
=== Grand-Prix years ===
- 2000 6pts (22nd overall)
- 2005 53pts (4th)
- 2006 58pts (Second)
- 2007 48pts (Second)
- 2008 33pts (10th)
- 2009 74pts (7th)
- 2010 140pts (CHAMPION)
- 2011 127pts (CHAMPION)
- 2012 149pts (CHAMPION)
- 2013 126pts (CHAMPION)
- 2014 66pts (Third)
- 2015 46pts (7th).

=== Best Grand-Prix results ===
- (Netherlands) Eenrum First 2015; Third 2010.
- (Finland) Forssa First 2010, 2012, Second 2013.
- (Norway) Forus First 2012, 2013, Second 2011.
- (Germany) Herxheim bei Landau/Pfalz First 2015.
- (France) Marmande First 2010, 2012, Second 2011, Third 2007.
- (Germany) Mühldorf First 2014.
- (Germany) Pfarrkirchen Second 2010.
- (France) Saint-Macaire First 2010, Second 2007, 2008.
- (Germany) Vechta First 2010, 2012, Second 2011, 2013, Third 2009.

=== Team championship ===
- 2009 (Netherlands) Eenrum (6th) 13/31pts (Rode with Rene Lehtinen, Kaj Laukkanen, Aki Pekka Mustonen)
- 2010 (France) Morizès (5th) 15/24pts (Rode with Rene Lehtinen, Pasi Pulliainen, Aki Pekka Mustonen)

== European Grasstrack Championship ==
Finalist 2000 (France) Saint-Colomb-de-Lauzun 15pts (5th overall).

== Personal life ==
After finishing his sports career in 2017 due to a career-ending injury in December 2016, Kylmäkorpi began pursuing entrepreneurship. In 2022, he co-founded a nicotine pouch manufacturing company with a factory in Poznań, Poland. In 2024, the company introduced their own brand, LUMI, and launched an online shop, TheLumiClub.com.

== See also ==
- Finland national speedway team
- List of Speedway Grand Prix riders
