= Weimar Classicism =

German literary and cultural movement, whose practitioners established a new humanism

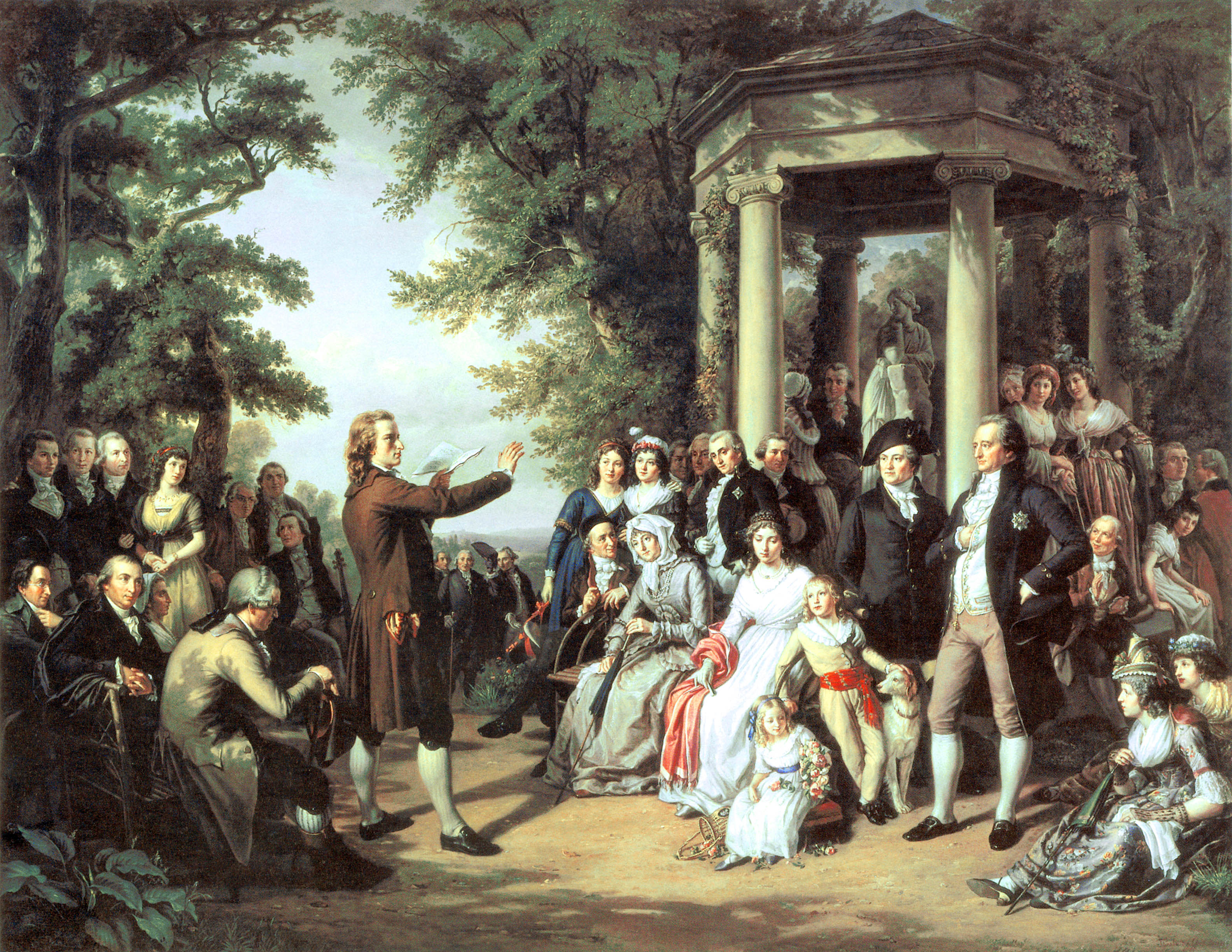
- Weimar's Courtyard of the Muses (1860) by Theobald von Oer. Schiller reads in the gardens of Schloss Tiefurt, Weimar. Amongst the audience are Herder (second person seated at the far left), Wieland (center, seated with cap) and Goethe (in front of the pillar, right).
- Years active: 1786–1805
- Location: Germany
- Major figures: Johann Wolfgang von Goethe; Friedrich Schiller; Caroline von Wolzogen
- Influences: Sturm und Drang, Classicism

Weimar Classicism (German: Weimarer Klassik) was a German literary and cultural movement, whose practitioners established a new humanism from the synthesis of ideas from Romanticism, Classicism, and the Age of Enlightenment. It was named after the city of Weimar in the Duchy of Saxe-Weimar because its leading authors lived there.

The Weimarer Klassik movement began in 1771 when Duchess Anna Amalia of Brunswick-Wolfenbüttel invited the Seyler Theatre Company led by Abel Seyler, pioneers of the Sturm und Drang movement, to her court in Weimar. The Seyler company was soon thereafter followed by Christoph Martin Wieland, then Johann Wolfgang von Goethe, Johann Gottfried Herder and finally Friedrich Schiller. The movement was eventually centred upon Goethe and Schiller, previously also exponents of the Sturm und Drang movement, during the period of 1786–1805.

== Development ==
=== Background ===
The German Enlightenment, called "neo-classical", burgeoned in the synthesis of Empiricism and Rationalism as developed by Christian Thomasius (1655–1728) and Christian Wolff (1679–1754). This philosophy, circulated widely in many magazines and journals, profoundly directed the subsequent expansion of German-speaking and European culture.

The inability of this common-sense outlook convincingly to bridge "feeling" and "thought", "body" and "mind", led to Immanuel Kant's epochal "critical" philosophy. Another, though not as abstract, approach to this problem was a governing concern with the problems of aesthetics. In his Aesthetica of 1750 (vol. II; 1758) Alexander Baumgarten (1714–62) defined "aesthetics", which he coined earlier in 1735, with its current intention as the "science" of the "lower faculties" (i.e., feeling, sensation, imagination, memory, et al.), which earlier figures of the Enlightenment had neglected. (The term, however, gave way to misunderstandings due to Baumgarten's use of the Latin in accordance with the German renditions, and consequently this has often led many to falsely undervalue his accomplishment.) It was no inquiry into taste—into positive or negative appeals—nor sensations as such but rather a way of knowledge. Baumgarten's emphasis on the need for such "sensuous" knowledge was a major abetment to the "pre-Romanticism" known as Sturm und Drang (1765), of which Goethe and Schiller were notable participants for a time.

=== Cultural and historical context ===
Abel Seyler's theatre company's arrival in Weimar marked the infancy of Weimar Classicism.

The starting point of Weimar Classicism, or the era of German classical literature, was in 1771 when the widowed Anna Amalia invited the Seyler Theatre Company led by Abel Seyler, including several prominent actors and playwrights such as Konrad Ekhof, to her court; the troupe stayed at Anna Amalia's court until 1774. The Seyler Theatre Company was considered "the best theatre company that existed in Germany during that time [1769–1779]" and pioneered the Sturm und Drang movement (itself named for a play written for the company) as well as serious German theatre and opera. The following year she invited Christoph Martin Wieland to Weimar to educate her two sons. Wieland had just published his modern and ironic mirror-for-princes work, Der goldne Spiegel oder die Könige von Scheschian. Wieland became an important friend and collaborator of both Seyler, and later Goethe.

Before Goethe was called to Weimar in 1775 at the age of 26, also as a tutor for princes, he had become the leader of the Sturm und Drang movement – named for Friedrich Maximilian Klinger's play of the same name, written for Abel Seyler's theatrical company – primarily through his epistolary novel The Sorrows of Young Werther. With Goethe's move to Weimar, his works steadily matured, aligning more with an aesthetic ideal that approached the content and form of classical antiquity. Pursuing this ideal geographically as well, Goethe traveled to Italy in 1786. In Italy, Goethe aimed to rediscover himself as a writer and to become an artist, through formal training in Rome, Europe's 'school of art'. While he failed as an artist, Italy appeared to have made him a better writer. Immediately after his return in the spring of 1788, he freed himself from his previous duties and met Schiller in Rudolstadt in September. This encounter was rather disillusioning for both: Goethe considered Schiller a hothead of the Sturm und Drang, while Schiller saw Goethe's poetic approach in stark contrast to his own.

Schiller's evolution as a writer was following a similar path to Goethe's. He had begun as a writer of wild, violent, emotion-driven plays. In the late 1780s he turned to a more classical style. In 1794, Schiller and Goethe became friends and allies in a project to establish new standards for literature and the arts in Germany.

By contrast, the contemporaneous and efflorescing literary movement of German Romanticism was in opposition to Weimar and German Classicism, especially to Schiller. It is in this way both may be best understood, even to the degree in which Goethe continuously and stringently criticized it through much of his essays, such as "On Dilettantism", on art and literature. After Schiller's death, the continuity of these objections partly elucidates the nature of Goethe's ideas in art and how they intermingled with his scientific thinking as well, inasmuch as it gives coherence to Goethe's work. Weimar Classicism may be seen as an attempt to reconcile—in "binary synthesis"—the vivid feeling emphasized by the Sturm und Drang movement with the clear thought emphasized by the Enlightenment, thus implying Weimar Classicism is intrinsically un-Platonic. On this Goethe remarked:

The idea of the distinction between classical and romantic poetry [Dichtung], which is now spread over the whole world, and occasions so many quarrels and divisions, came originally from Schiller and myself. I laid down the maxim of objective treatment of poetry, and would allow no other; but Schiller, who worked quite in the subjective way, deemed his own fashion the right one, and to defend himself against me, wrote the treatise upon 'Naïve and Sentimental Poetry.' He proved to me that I myself, against my will, was romantic, and that my 'Iphigenia,' through the predominance of sentiment, was by no means so classical and so much in the antique spirit as some people supposed. The Schlegels took up this idea, and carried it further, so that it has now been diffused over the whole world; and every one talks about classicism and romanticism—of which nobody thought fifty years ago.

The Weimar movement was notable for its inclusion of female writers. Die Horen published works by several women, including a serially published novel, Agnes von Lilien, by Schiller's sister-in-law Caroline von Wolzogen. Other women published by Schiller included Sophie Mereau, Friederike Brun, Amalie von Imhoff, Elisa von der Recke, and Louise Brachmann.

Between 1786 and Schiller's death in 1805, he and Goethe worked to recruit a network of writers, philosophers, scholars, artists and even representatives of the natural sciences such as Alexander von Humboldt to their cause. This alliance later became known as 'Weimar Classicism', and it came to form a part of the foundation of 19th-century Germany's understanding of itself as a culture and the political unification of Germany.

== Aesthetic and philosophical principles ==
These are essentials used by Goethe and Schiller:

1. Gehalt: the inexpressible "felt-thought", or "import", which is alive in the artist and the percipient that he or she finds means to express within the aesthetic form, hence Gehalt is implicit with form. A work's Gehalt is not reducible to its Inhalt.
2. Gestalt: the aesthetic form, in which the import of the work is stratified, that emerges from the regulation of forms (these being rhetorical, grammatical, intellectual, and so on) abstracted from the world or created by the artist, with sense relationships prevailing within the employed medium.
3. Stoff: Schiller and Goethe reserve this (almost solely) for the forms taken from the world or that are created. In a work of art, Stoff (designated as "Inhalt", or "content", when observed in this context) is to be "indifferent" ("gleichgültig"), that is, it should not arouse undue interest, deflecting attention from the aesthetic form. Indeed, Stoff (i.e., also the medium through which the artist creates) needs to be in such a complete state of unicity with the Gestalt of the art-symbol that it cannot be abstracted except at the cost of destroying the aesthetic relations established by the artist.

== Primary authors ==
=== Goethe and Schiller ===
Although the vociferously unrestricted, even "organic", works that were produced, such as Wilhelm Meister, Faust, and West-östlicher Divan, where playful and turbulent ironies abound, may perceivably lend Weimar Classicism the double, ironic title "Weimar Romanticism", it must nevertheless be understood that Goethe consistently demanded this distance via irony to be imbued within a work for precipitate aesthetic affect.

Schiller was very prolific during this period, writing his plays Wallenstein (1799), Mary Stuart (1800), The Maid of Orleans (1801), The Bride of Messina (1803) and William Tell (1804).

== Primary works of the period ==
=== Christoph Martin Wieland ===
- Alceste, (stage play, 1773, first on stage: Weimar, May 25, 1773)
- Die Geschichte der Abderiten, (novel on ancient Abdera, Leipzig 1774–1780)
- Hann und Gulpenheh, (rhymed novel, Weimar 1778)
- Schach Lolo, (rhymed novel, Weimar 1778)
- Oberon, (rhymed novel, Weimar 1780)
- Dschinnistan, (tom. I-III, Winterthur 1786–1789)
- Geheime Geschichte des Philosophen Peregrinus Proteus, (novel, Weimar 1788/89; Leipzig 1791)
- Agathodämon, (novel, Leipzig 1796–1797)
- Aristipp und einige seiner Zeitgenossen, (novel on Aristippus, tom. I-IV, Leipzig: Göschen 1800–1802)

=== Johann Gottfried Herder ===
- Volkslieder nebst untermischten anderen Stücken (1778–1779, ²1807: Stimmen der Völker in Liedern)
- Ideen zur Philosophie der Geschichte der Menschheit (essays, tom. I-IV, 1784–1791)
- Briefe zur Beförderung der Humanität, (collected essays, 1791–1797)
- Terpsichore, (Lübeck 1795)
- Christliche Schriften, (5 collections, Riga 1796–1799)
- Metakritik zur Kritik der reinen Vernunft, (essay, Part I+II, Leipzig 1799)
- Kalligone, (Leipzig 1800)

=== Johann Wolfgang (von) Goethe ===
- Egmont ("Trauerspiel", begun in 1775, published 1788)
- Wilhelm Meisters theatralische Sendung (novel from 1776, published 1911)
- Stella. Ein Schauspiel für Liebende (stage play, 1776)
- Iphigenie auf Tauris ("Iphigenia in Tauris", stage play, published 1787)
- Torquato Tasso (stage play, 1780–, published 1790)
- Römische Elegien (written 1788–90)
- Venezianische Epigramme (1790)
- Faust. Ein Fragment (1790)
- Theory of Colours 1791/92)
- Der Bürgergeneral (stage play, 1793)
- Reineke Fuchs ("Reineke Fox", hexametric epic poem, 1794)
- Unterhaltungen deutscher Ausgewanderten ("Conversations of German Refugees", 1795)
- Das Märchen, ("The Green Snake and the Beautiful Lily", fairy tale, 1795)
- Wilhelm Meisters Lehrjahre ("Wilhelm Meister's Apprenticeship", novel, 1795/96)
- Faust. Eine Tragödie ("Faust" I, 1797–, first print 1808)
- Novelle (1797– )
- Hermann und Dorothea ("Hermann and Dorothea", hexametric epic poem, 1798)
- Die natürliche Tochter (stage play, 1804)
- Die Wahlverwandtschaften ("Elective Affinities", novel, 1809)

=== Friedrich (von) Schiller ===
- Don Karlos, (stage play, 1787)
- Über den Grund des Vergnügens an tragischen Gegenständen, (essay, 1792)
- Augustenburger Briefe, (essays, 1793)
- Über Anmut und Würde, (essay, 1793)
- Kallias-Briefe, (essays, 1793)
- Über die ästhetische Erziehung des Menschen, ("On the Aesthetic Education of Man", essays, 1795)
- Über naive und sentimentalische Dichtung, (essay, 1795)
- Der Taucher, (poem, 1797)
- Die Kraniche des Ibykus, (poem, 1797)
- Ritter Toggenburg, (poem, 1797)
- Der Ring des Polykrates, (poem, 7987)
- Der Geisterseher, ("The Ghost-seer", (1789)
- Die Bürgschaft, (poem, 1798)
- Wallenstein (trilogy of stage plays, 1799)
- Das Lied von der Glocke (poem, 1799)
- Maria Stuart ("Mary Stuart", stage play, 1800)
- Die Jungfrau von Orleans ("The Maid of Orleans", stage play, 1801)
- Die Braut von Messina ("The Bride of Messina", stage play, 1803)
- Das Siegesfest (poem, 1803)
- Wilhelm Tell "(William Tell", stage play, 1803/04)
- Die Huldigung der Künste (poem, 1804)
- Demetrius (stage play, incomplete, 1805)

=== By Goethe and Schiller in collaboration ===
- Die Horen (edited by Schiller, periodical, 1795–96)
- Musenalmanach (editorship, many contributions, 1796–97)
- Xenien (poems, 1796)
- Almanach (editorship, many contributions, 1798–1800)
- Propyläen (periodical, 1798–1801)

See also: works by Herder, works by Goethe, and works by Schiller.

== Selected bibliography ==
=== Primary ===
1. Schiller, J. C. Friedrich, On the Aesthetic Education of Man: In a Series of Letters, ed. and trans. by Wilkinson, Elizabeth M. and L. A. Willoughby, Clarendon Press, 1967.

=== Secondary ===
1. Amrine, F, Zucker, F. J., and Wheeler, H. (Eds.), Goethe and the Sciences: A Reappraisal, BSPS, D. Reidel, 1987, ISBN 90-277-2265-X
2. Bishop, Paul & R. H. Stephenson, Friedrich Nietzsche and Weimar Classicism, Camden House, 2004, ISBN 1-57113-280-5.
3. —, "Goethe's Late Verse", in The Literature of German Romanticism, ed. by Dennis F. Mahoney, Vol. 8 of The Camden House History of German Literature, Rochester, N. Y., 2004.
4. Borchmeyer, Dieter, Weimarer Klassik: Portrait einer Epoche, Weinheim, 1994, ISBN 3-89547-112-7.
5. Buschmeier, Matthias; Kauffmann, Kai: Einführung in die Literatur des Sturm und Drang und der Weimarer Klassik, Darmstadt, 2010.
6. Cassirer, Ernst, Goethe und die geschichtliche Welt, Berlin, 1932.
7. Daum, Andreas W., "Social Relations, Shared Practices, and Emotions: Alexander von Humboldt’s Excursion into Literary Classicism and the Challenges to Science around 1800", in Journal of Modern History 91 (March 2019), 1–37.
8. Ellis, John, Schiller's Kalliasbriefe and the Study of his Aesthetic Theory, The Hague, 1970.
9. Kerry, S., Schiller's Writings on Aesthetics, Manchester, 1961.
10. Nisbet, H. B., Goethe and the Scientific Tradition, Leeds, 1972, ISBN 0-85457-050-0.
11. Martin, Nicholas, Nietzsche and Schiller: Untimely Aesthetics, Clarendon Press, 1996, ISBN 0-19-815913-7.
12. Reemtsma, Jan Philipp, "Der Liebe Maskentanz": Aufsätze zum Werk Christoph Martin Wielands, 1999, ISBN 3-251-00453-0.
13. Stephenson, R. H., "The Cultural Theory of Weimar Classicism in the light of Coleridge's Doctrine of Aesthetic Knowledge", in Goethe 2000, ed. by Paul Bishop and R. H. Stephenson, Leeds, 2000.
14. —, "Die ästhetische Gegenwärtigkeit des Vergangenen: Goethes 'Maximen und Reflexionen' über Geschichte und Gesellschaft, Erkenntnis und Erziehung", Goethe-Jahrbuch, 114, 1997, 101–12; 382–84.
15. —, 'Goethe's Prose Style: Making Sense of Sense', Publications of the English Goethe Society, 66, 1996, 31–41.
16. —, Goethe's Conception of Knowledge and Science, Edinburgh, 1995, ISBN 0-7486-0538-X.
17. Wilkinson, Elizabeth M. and L. A. Willoughby, "'The Whole Man' in Schiller's theory of Culture and Society", in Essays in German Language, Culture and Society, ed. Prawer et al., London, 1969, 177–210.
18. —, Goethe, Poet and Thinker, London, 1972.
19. Willoughby, L. A., The Classical Age of German Literature 1748–1805, New York, 1966.

== See also ==
- Ernst Cassirer
- S. T. Coleridge
- J. G. Fichte
- Jena Romanticism
- Johann Georg Hamann
- Johann Gottfried Herder
- Friedrich Hölderlin
- A. v. Humboldt
- W. v. Humboldt
- C. G. Jung
- C. G. Körner
- Johann Heinrich Meyer
- Karl Philipp Moritz
- Friedrich Nietzsche
- Jean-Jacques Rousseau
- F. W. J. Schelling
- Weltliteratur
- Christoph Martin Wieland
