= Critical and Miscellaneous Essays =

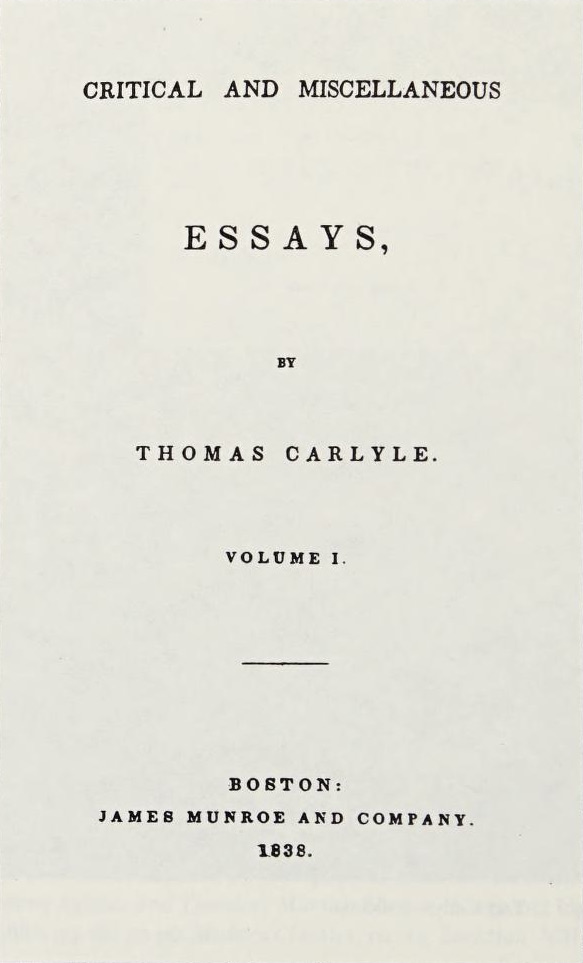
- Title page of the first American edition
- Author: Thomas Carlyle
- Language: English
- Publisher: James Munroe and Company
- Publication date: 1838–1839
- Publication place: United States
- Media type: Print (hardback)

Critical and Miscellaneous Essays is the title of a collection of reprinted reviews and other magazine pieces by the Scottish essayist, historian and philosopher Thomas Carlyle. Along with Sartor Resartus and The French Revolution it was one of the books that made his name. Its subject matter ranges from literary criticism (especially of German literature) to biography, history and social commentary. These essays have been described as "Intriguing in their own right as specimens of graphic and original nonfiction prose…indispensable for understanding the development of Carlyle's mind and literary career", and the scholar Angus Ross has noted that the review-form displays in the highest degree Carlyle's "discursiveness, allusiveness, argumentativeness, and his sense of playing the prophet's part."

== Publication ==
Carlyle earned his living during the late 1820s and early 1830s as a reviewer and essayist, contributing to the Edinburgh Review, the Foreign Review, Fraser's Magazine, and other journals. As early as 1830 he thought about collecting these pieces in book form, but it was not until 1837 that he seriously prepared for such an edition, when with the help of his friends Ralph Waldo Emerson, Harriet Martineau and others, he entered into negotiations with the Boston publisher James Munroe. The Critical and Miscellaneous Essays were duly published by him in four volumes, the first two being issued on 14 July 1838, with a preface by Emerson, and the last two on 1 July 1839. 250 copies of the Munroe edition were sent to the London publisher James Fraser, who first sold them under his own imprint and then, in 1840, produced a second edition. A third edition followed in 1847, and a fourth in 1857, each published by the firm of Chapman & Hall, and each incorporating additions from Carlyle's continuing journalistic output.

== Reception ==
American Unitarian minister James Freeman Clarke recalled in 1864 that "especially to the younger men, this new writer came, opening up unknown worlds of beauty and wonder. A strange influence, unlike any other, attracted us to his writing. Before we knew his name, we knew him. We could recognize an article by our new author as soon as we opened the pages of the Foreign Review, Edinburgh, or Westminster, and read a few paragraphs." In the preface to the Boston edition, Emerson reminded American readers of "pages which, in the scattered anonymous sheets of the British magazines, spoke to their youthful mind with an emphasis that hindered them from sleep."

Richard Wagner referenced "Novalis" in his essay "On Poetry and Composition" (1879). Doctor and theosophist William Ashton Ellis quoted from "Novalis" in a lecture delivered at a meeting of the Society for the Encouragement of the Fine Arts on 3 February 1887.

== List of essays ==
The following is a list of the contents of the Critical and Miscellaneous Essays as they appear in the Centenary Edition (originally published 1896–1899), being the standard edition of the works of Thomas Carlyle.

Volume I

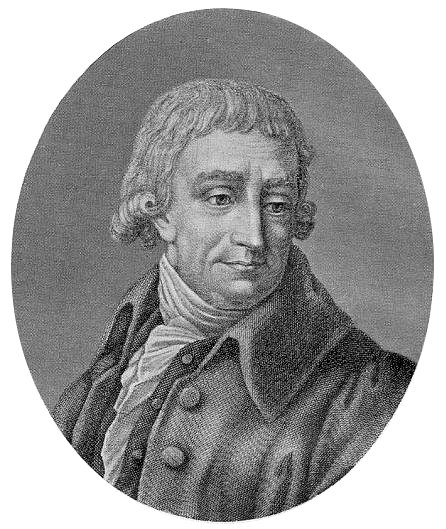
C. G. Heyne

- INTRODUCTION by Henry Duff Traill
- Jean Paul Friedrich Richter [1827]
  1. Edinburgh Review, No. 91.
- State of German Literature [1827]
  1. Edinburgh Review, No. 92.
- Life and Writings of Werner [1828]
  1. Foreign Review, No. 1.
- Goethe's Helena [1828]
  1. Foreign Review, No. 2.
- Goethe [1828]
  1. Foreign Review, No. 3.
- Burns [1828]
  1. Edinburgh Review, No. 96.
- The Life of Heyne [1828]
  1. Foreign Review, No. 4.
- German Playwrights [1829]
  1. Foreign Review, No. 6.
- Voltaire [1829]
  1. Foreign Review, No. 6.
- Appendix I
  - Fractions [1823-1833]
    1. The Tragedy of the Night-Moth
    2. Cui Bono
    3. Four Fables
    4. The Sower's Song
    5. Adieu
    6. The Beetle
    7. Today
    8. Fortuna
- Appendix II
  1. Jean Paul Friedrich Richter's Review of Madame de Staël's 'Allemagne.' [1830]
    1. Fraser's Magazine, Nos. 1 and 4.
  2. Schiller, Goethe, and Madame de Staël [1832]
    1. Fraser's Magazine, No. 26.
- Summary

Volume II

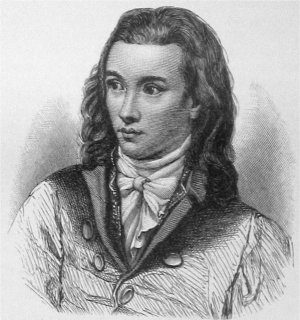
Novalis

- Novalis [1829]
  1. Foreign Review, No. 7.
- Signs of the Times [1829]
  1. Edinburgh Review, No. 98.
- On History [1830]
  1. Fraser's Magazine, No. 10.
- Jean Paul Friedrich Richter Again [1830]
  1. Foreign Review, No. 9.
- Luther's Psalm [1831]
  1. Fraser's Magazine, No. 12.
- Schiller [1831]
  1. Fraser's Magazine, No. 14.
- The Nibelungen Lied [1831]
  1. Westminster Review, No. 29.
- German Literature of the XIV. and XV. Centuries [1831]
  1. Foreign Quarterly Review, No. 16.
- Taylor's Historic Survey of German Poetry [1831]
  1. Edinburgh Review, No. 105.
- Goethe's Portrait [1832]
  1. Fraser's Magazine, No. 26.
- Death of Goethe [1832]
  1. New Monthly Magazine, No. 138.
- Goethe's Works [1832]
  1. Foreign Quarterly Review, No. 19.
- Appendix
  1. The Tale [1832]
    1. Fraser's Magazine, No. 33.
  2. Novelle [1832]
    1. Fraser's Magazine, No. 34.
- Summary

Volume III

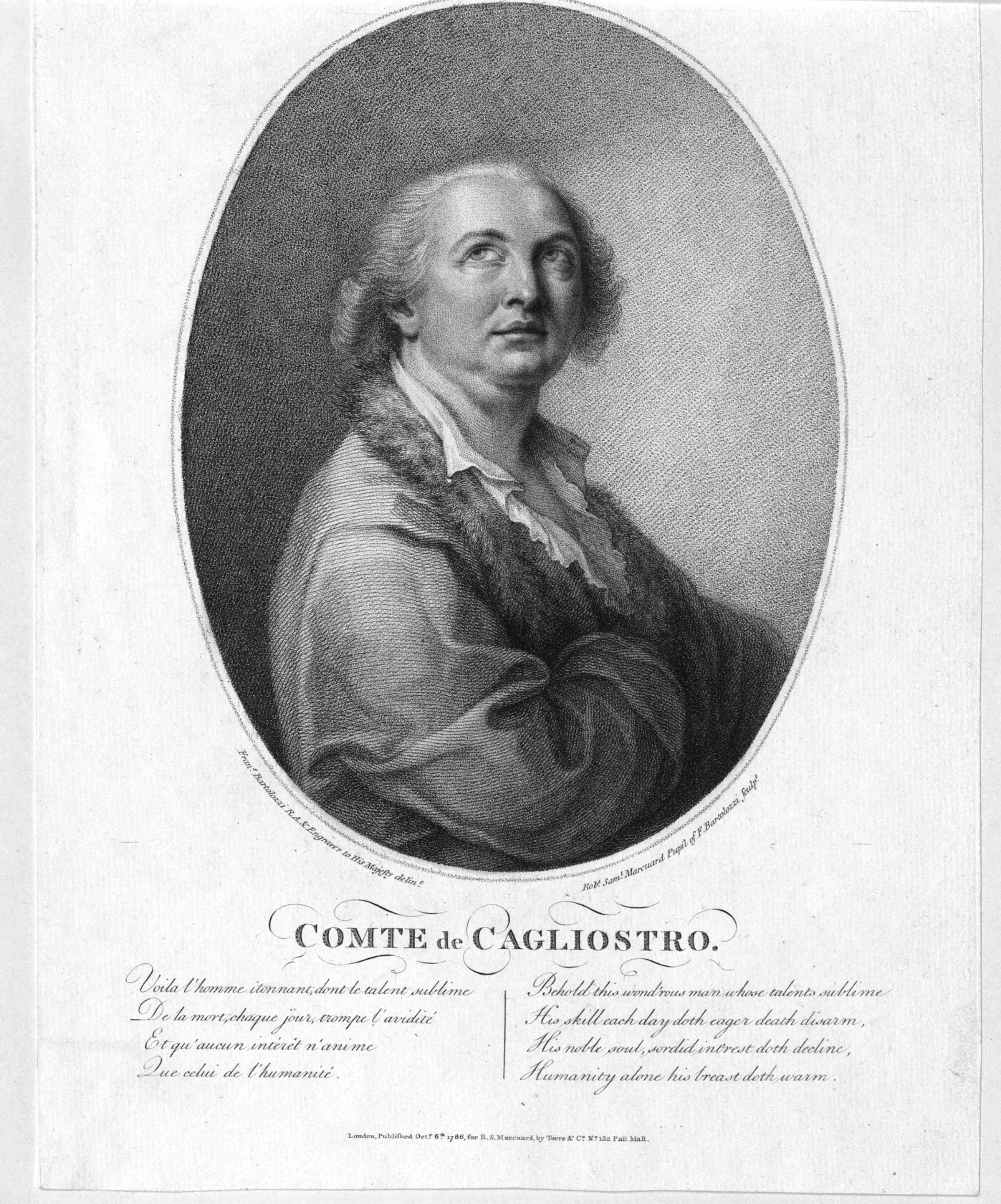
Count Cagliostro

- Characteristics [1831]
  1. Edinburgh Review, No. 108.
- Biography [1832]
  1. Fraser's Magazine, No. 27 (for April).
- Boswell's Life of Johnson [1832]
  1. Fraser's Magazine, No. 28.
- Corn-Law Rhymes [1832]
  1. Edinburgh Review, No. 110.
- On History Again [1833]
  1. Fraser's Magazine, No. 41.
- Diderot [1833]
  1. Foreign Quarterly Review, No. 22.
- Count Cagliostro [1833]
  1. Fraser's Magazine, Nos. 43, 44 (July and August).
- Death of Edward Irving [1835]
  1. Fraser's Magazine, No. 61.
- The Diamond Necklace [1837]
  1. Fraser's Magazine, Nos. 85 and 86.
- Mirabeau [1837]
  - London and Westminster Review, No. 8.
- Summary

Volume IV

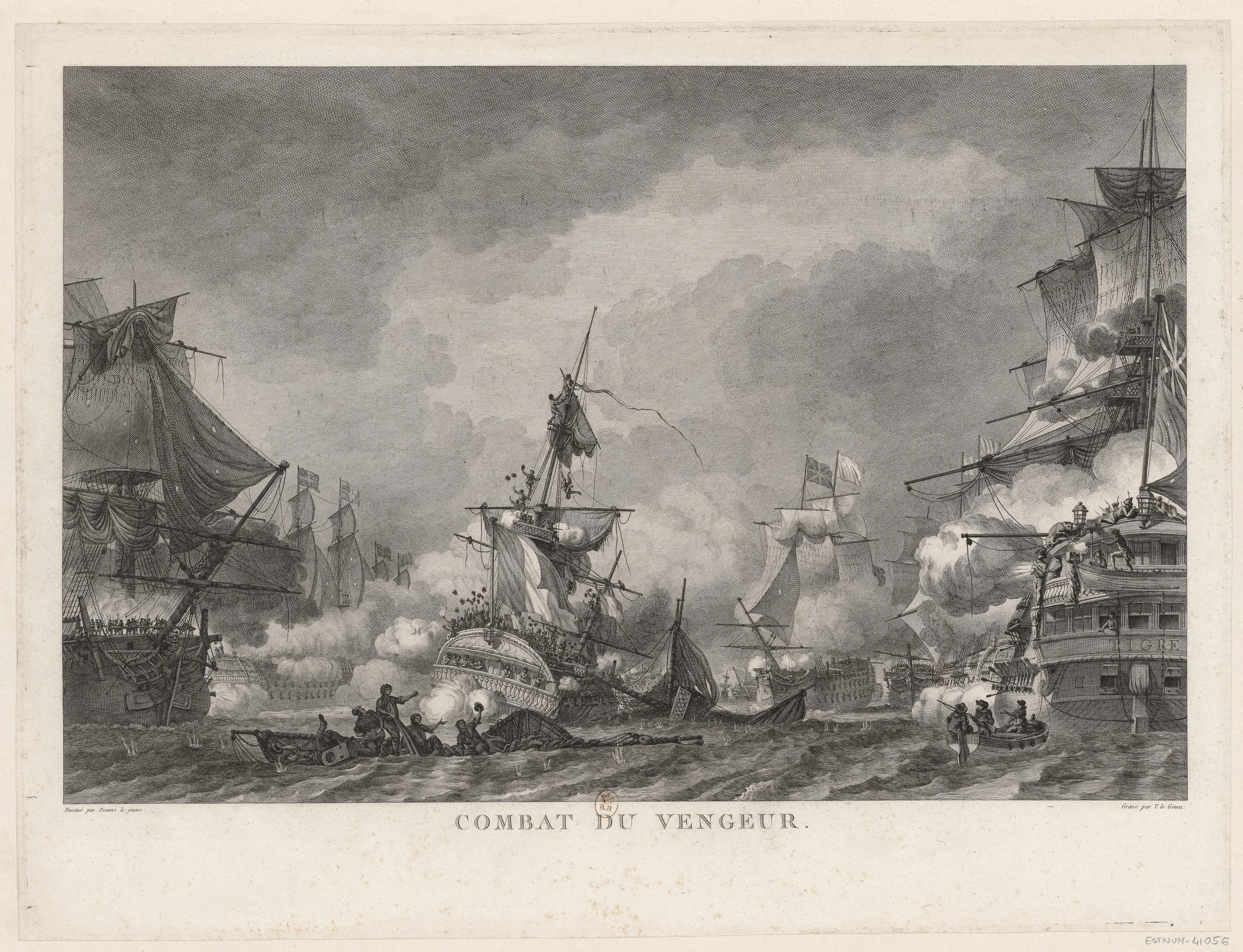
Sinking of the Vengeur

- Parliamentary History of the French Revolution [1837]
  1. London and Westminster Review, No. 9.
- Sir Walter Scott [1838]
  1. London and Westminster Review, No. 12.
- Varnhagen von Ense's Memoirs [1838]
  1. London and Westminster Review, No. 62.
- Chartism [1839]
- Petition on the Copyright Bill [1839]
  1. The Examiner, April 7, 1839.
- On the Sinking of the Vengeur [1839] (Note: First collected in the 1840 edition.)
  1. Fraser's Magazine, No. 115.
- Baillie the Covenanter [1841] (Note: First collected in the 1847 edition.)
  1. London and Westminster Review, No. 72.
- Dr. Francia [1843] (Note: First collected in the 1847 edition.)
  1. Foreign Quarterly Review, No. 62.
- An Election to the Long Parliament [1844] (Note: First collected in the 1847 edition.)
  1. Fraser's Magazine, No. 178.
- The Nigger Question [1849]
  1. First printed in Fraser's Magazine, December 1849; reprinted in the form of a separate Pamphlet, London, 1853.
- Two Hundred and Fifty Years Ago [1850] (Note: First collected in the 1857 edition.)
  1. Found recently in Leigh Hunt's Journal, Nos. 1, 3, 6 (Saturday 7 December 1850 et seqq.). Said there to be 'from a Waste-paper Bag' of mine. Apparently some fraction of a certain History (Failure of a History) of James I., of which I have indistinct recollections. (Note of 1857.)
- The Opera (Note: First collected in the 1857 edition.)
  - Keepsake for 1852.
- Project of a National Exhibition of Scottish Portraits [1854] (Note: First collected in the 1857 edition.)
  1. Printed in Proceedings of the Society of Antiquaries of Scotland, vol. i. part 3 (4to, Edinburgh, 1855).
- The Prinzenraub [1855] (Note: First collected in the 1857 edition.)
  - Westminster Review, No. 123, January 1855.
- Inaugural Address at Edinburgh, 2 April 1866
- Summary

Volume V

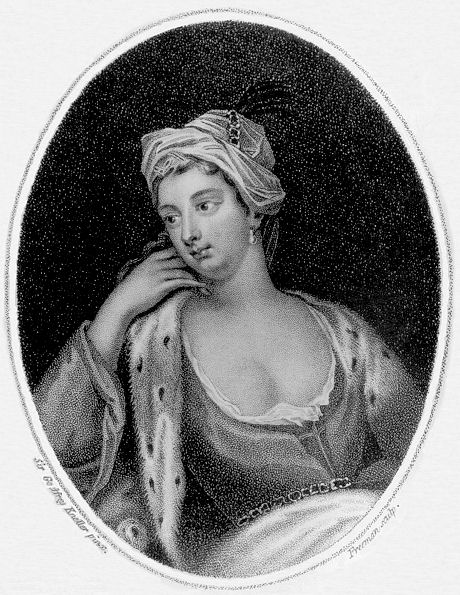
Lady Mary Wortley Montagu

- Shooting Niagara: And After? [August 1867]
  - Reprinted from Macmillan's Magazine, for August 1867. With some additions and corrections.
- Latter Stage of the French-German War, 1870–71
  - Summary
- Papers Collected for the First Time
  - Montaigne
    1. Edinburgh Encyclopædia, vol. xiv.
  - Lady Mary Wortley Montagu
    1. Edinburgh Encyclopædia, vol. xiv.
  - Montesquieu
    1. Edinburgh Encyclopædia, vol. xiv.
  - Necker
    1. Edinburgh Encyclopædia, vol. xv.
  - The Netherlands
    1. Edinburgh Encyclopædia, vol. xv.
  - William Pitt, Earl of Chatham
    1. Edinburgh Encyclopædia, vol. xvi.
  - William Pitt, the Younger
    1. Edinburgh Encyclopædia, vol. xvi.
  - Cruthers and Jonson; or the Outskirts of Life
    - Fraser's Magazine, January 1831.
  - Early Kings of Norway
    1. Harald Haarfagr
    2. Eric Blood-axe and Brothers
    3. Hakon the Good
    4. Harald Greyfell and Brothers
    5. Hakon Jarl
    6. Olaf Tryggveson
    7. Reign of Olaf Tryggveson
    8. Jarls Eric and Svein
    9. King Olaf the Thick-set's Viking Days
    10. Reign of King Olaf the Saint
    11. Magnus the Good and Others
    12. Olaf the Tranquil, Magnus Barefoot, and Sigurd the Crusader
    13. Magnus the Blind, Harald Gylle, and mutual Extinction of the Haarfagrs
    14. Sverrir and Descendants, to Hakon the Old
    15. Hakon the Old at Largs
    16. Epilogue
  - The Portraits of John Knox
  - Index

== Bibliography ==
- Wagner, Cosima (1978). Diaries (2 vols.). Translated by Skelton, Geoffrey. London: Dent. ISBN 978-0-15-122635-1.
