= The German Refugees =

1795 short story collection by Johann Wolfgang von Goethe

- Author: Johann Wolfgang von Goethe
- Original title: Unterhaltungen deutscher Ausgewanderten
- Language: German
- Publisher: Die Horen
- Publication date: 1795
- Publication place: Germany

The German Refugees (German: Unterhaltungen deutscher Ausgewanderten, lit. 'Conversations of German Emigrants') is a 1795 short story collection by the German writer Johann Wolfgang von Goethe. It consists of a frame story where a group of German nobles have escaped the violence of the French Revolution and entertain themselves by telling stories in the countryside. In addition to the frame narrative, the collection contains seven stories and ends with the longest and most famous, "The Green Snake and the Beautiful Lily" ("Das Märchen").

Goethe wrote the stories in the winter of 1794 while he worked on Wilhelm Meister's Apprenticeship. The concept was modelled on The Decameron by Giovanni Boccaccio. The stories were originally published in Friedrich Schiller's journal Die Horen in 1795.

== Adaptations ==
- Die Frau ohne Schatten, 1919 opera by Richard Strauss, loosely based libretto
- Das Märchen von der schönen Lilie, 1969 opera by Giselher Klebe
