= Nicolae Quintescu =

Wallachian-Romanian philologist, essayist and translator

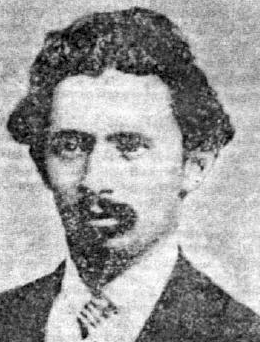
- Born: February 21, 1841; Craiova
- Died: August 12, 1913 (aged 72)
- Education: Saint Sava College, Bonn University
- Known for: literary commentary from a comparatist perspective and travel accounts
- Notable work: translating Johann Wolfgang von Goethe's Egmont and Friedrich Schiller's Die Huldigung der Künste
- Father: Chiriac Chintescu

Nicolae Chiriac Quintescu (February 21, 1841 – August 12, 1913) was a Wallachian, later Romanian philologist, essayist and translator.

He was born in Craiova; his father seems to have been Chiriac Chintescu, who farmed a nearby plot of land given to him on lease. Chiriac appears in a petition of 1831 and was on the city council in 1848. Nicolae later described himself as a "son of Oltenia" who grew up "in the fortifying atmosphere.... in which Ioan Maiorescu had worked". He graduated from Saint Sava College in Bucharest, and in 1861 left for Germany. There, he took a degree in classical philology from Bonn University and, in 1867, a doctorate in literature from the University of Berlin. The same year, after returning home, he became a professor of classical philology at the University of Iași; in 1881, he transferred to the University of Bucharest, retiring from the post in 1902. He became director of the capital city's higher normal school in 1898, serving for a brief period of time. While in Iași, Quintescu belonged to Junimea society, contributing to its Convorbiri Literare journal, but came into conflict with other members due to disagreements over philology. Elected a titular member of the Romanian Academy in 1877, he served as secretary of its literary section. Within the Academy, he belonged to a committee tasked with writing a dictionary, and to another that met in 1903 to standardize spelling norms. His activity as a writer began when Quintescu wrote unpublished poems as a young man; he later focused on literary commentary from a comparatist perspective. He authored travel accounts, also translating Johann Wolfgang von Goethe's Egmont and Friedrich Schiller's Die Huldigung der Künste.
