= Körner's Morning =

Play by Friedrich Schiller

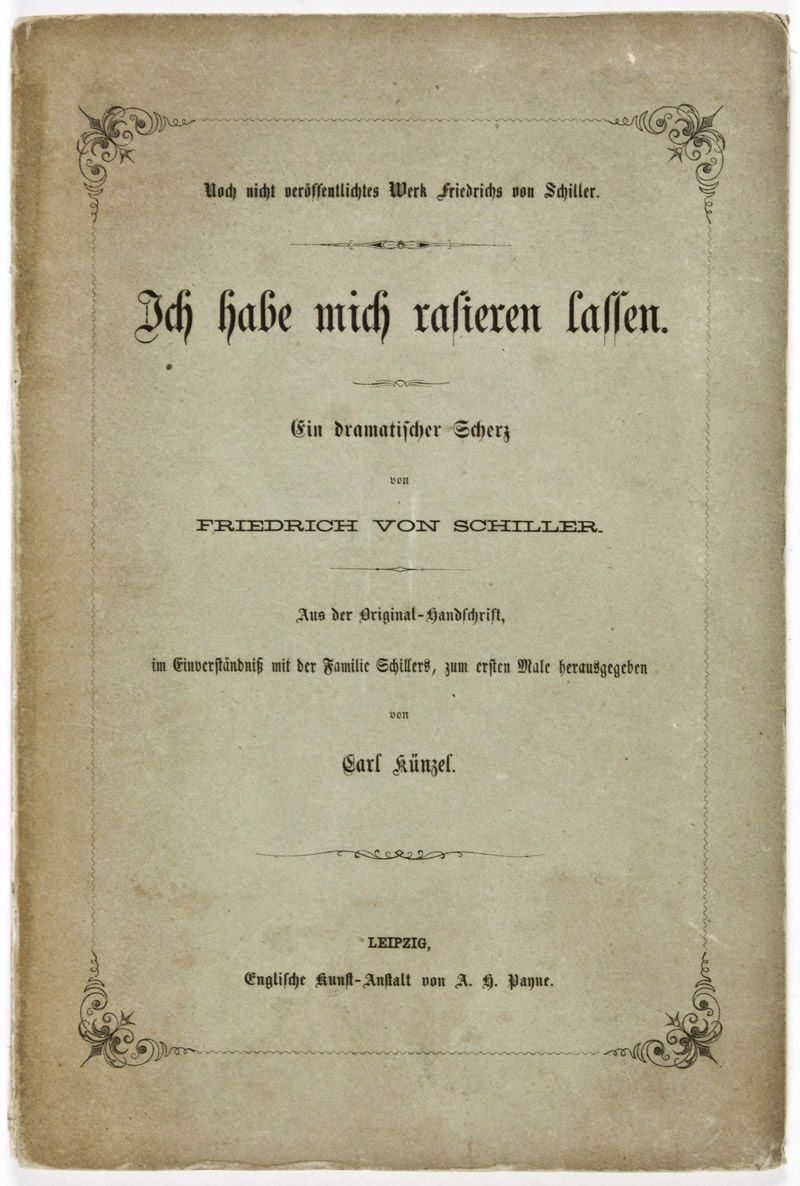
Title page of Ich habe mich rasieren lassen (1862)

Körner's Morning (Körners Vormittag) is a verse play by Friedrich Schiller. His only comedy, it was written for his friend Christian Gottfried Körner's birthday, probably between 5 June and 2 July 1787. Intended to be privately produced, it parodies the Dresden circle around Körner and his tendency not to finish works or only to finish them with great difficulty.

It was first published by Carl Künzel in 1862 (over 55 years after Schiller's death) as Ich habe mich rasieren lassen (I let myself shave). It shows a domestic phase in Schiller's life and simultaneously documents a piece of 18th century everyday life.

== Plot ==
The short piece presents an excerpt from the life of the notoriously overworked senior consistorial councilor Körner, who is initially seen in his study in his dressing gown and slippers and wants to work on a manuscript.

Relieved to have the morning to himself, he calls in his servant Gottlieb to shave him. But there is a constant knock on the door, suppliers, cobblers, tailors, city judges and others appear, harass him with questions and offers, involve him in hectic conversations and distract him.

Right at the beginning, Schiller appears, asks for the manuscript Raphael (Raphael's letter to Julius) for his philosophical letters, but only finds an incomplete sentence on the desk. When asked “Where are we going?” the exasperated Körner replies: "That’s all."

Time flies with the constant change of characters. Körner tries in vain to allow himself to be denied; his resolute wife Minna slaps his face, urges him to hurry up and reminds him of a meeting. Finally, around midday, he feels alone for a moment and wants to put on his pants to rush to the consistory, but is observed by Dorchen, who is shocked and runs out of the room screaming. Finally it's one o'clock and Körner has missed the meeting. Minna, Schiller, Dorchen and Huber shout in unison what he has done in God's name all morning. Körner strikes a pose and answers: “I had myself shaved.”

== Writing and publication ==
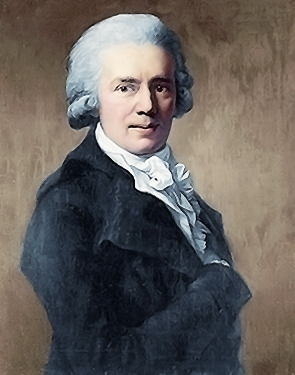
Christian Gottfried Körner by Anton Graff

Since the escape of "the Comtesse de la Motte" to England on June 5, 1787 is told as news at one point in the play ("You know that La Motte escaped."), Schiller must have written the relevant statement afterwards (Terminus post quem) and completed the work by Körner's 31st birthday.

The author had also given him literary birthday presents in previous years. In 1785, shortly after they met, Schiller wrote the conventional occasional poem Unserm theuren Körner.

A year later he designed 13 pen sketches that referred to everyday situations, were supplemented by comments from Ludwig Ferdinand Huber and were presented as Avanturas of the new Telemachus or Exsertions of Körner in the form of a bound celebratory newspaper.

The piece was probably performed on July 2, 1787 in Körner's house. Schiller was not only the actor himself, but also the Soap Familiar, while Dora Stock (Dorchen), Minna, Huber and grains represented themselves.

After her husband's death, Maria Körner initially kept the manuscript, but then sold it to the autograph dealer Carl Künzel in 1837 on the condition that he either destroy the entire booklet or the passages that "contain any nuance of Casting a shadow on Koerner's or Schiller's character." Künzel agreed, writing this and a personal oath on the last page: "I swear to do this, if God help me. Amen."

About thirty years later there was a debate in the Allgemeine Zeitung, in the course of which Künzel was accused of withholding the comedian Schiller from the world. Because of the increasing stress, he finally decided to publish the work and chose the title "I let myself be shaved". When Karl Goedeke included the farce in the fourth volume of his complete edition, he chose the title that is still used today.

== Background ==
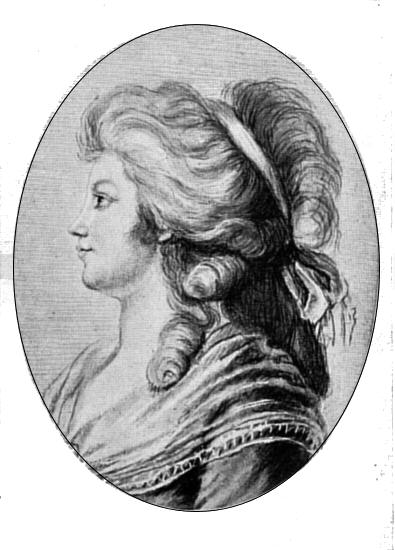
Minna Körner

With his short piece, Schiller parodied the Dresden circle around Körner. Art and philosophy suddenly encounter all sorts of everyday adversities. So Huber wants to read from his essay about the conspiracy of the People's Tribune Cola di Rienzo, but is interrupted by the intervening Schuster, who asks Körner whether he high or low heels wishes. Lofty philosophical plans are contrasted with the chaos of daily life, which threatens to sink into chaos with the comings and goings of numerous people and finds no peace in the messy apartment with laundry lying around and unpaid bills.

With his farce, Schiller was referring to Körner's expected contribution to the Philosophical Letters, which had appeared in the third issue of Thalia at the end of April 1786 and was to be continued. A fragment of the promised letter was finally published at the beginning of May 1789, but was probably largely written by Schiller himself.

Schiller clearly alluded to Körner's weakness in fulfilling promises on time. His passivity and indolence, his “trödeley,” as Körner himself called and lamented, was also ridiculed by other contemporaries.

The structure of the piece is based on the Proverbes dramatiques, one-act plays with a pointed, witty style, which emerged in France during the reign of Sun King and a thesis or presented a certain attitude to life in the course of a game of intrigue. They were initially only performed in aristocratic salons, but later also in public theaters on the boulevard.

The pieces drew their themes primarily from moralistics, but also from current political events, from press reports and even gossipstories, and represented a genre that the young Hugo von Hofmannsthal used in his lyric dramas Yesterday and The Gate and Death were taken up again.

Even though Schiller may not have written any other comedies of his own, this piece was not his only experience with comic material. At the request of the Duke Karl August, he later edited and translated two comedies by Louis-Benoît Picard: Encore des Ménechmes (initially The New Men, then The Nephew as Uncle) and Médiocre et rampant (first Mediocrity and Creep or How to Get to the Top, then The Parasite or The Art "to make one's luck"). In a few places he increased the comic effects, corrected insignificant careless errors and transferred them into Alexandrians originally wrote in a bourgeois conversational tone. The relative fidelity of the editing, however, is due less to meticulousness than to a simple lack of time. So he wrote to Körner that Picard's execution was too dry, but that further editing would have burdened him unduly and for what was essentially dubious work.

== Features and reception ==
In the text there are a number of interjectionss such as “Schicke!”, “Always!” and “Nature!”, which lexical are not listed and indicate a private language within the circle. Schiller's friend Johann Wolfgang von Goethe characterized such private language as "a kind of crook's idiom, which, while making the initiated extremely happy, remains unnoticed by strangers, or noticed, becomes annoying."

In contrast to the older "type comedies", the "vices" described are more the norm and no longer the exception and serve as strategies to escape the malaise of everyday life. Money in particular plays a central role in Körner's Morning, as it is constantly about certain legal transactions such as buying and selling, lending and inheriting. Schiller, who had found a generous patron in Körner, also knew that material conditions influence not only everyday bourgeois life, but also high art.

Even before the comedy was printed, a controversial discussion arose among experts about its meaning. Alfred von Wolzogen spoke of Schiller's “only original comedy,” which offered a closed look at his “cheerful mood” that could complete the image of the poet. Kuno Fischer, on the other hand, who looked for central elements of the comic in Schiller's work, warned against an exaggerated assessment. The farce was “nothing more than a good domestic joke” that the good-humoured Schiller “designed with a cheerful hand”.

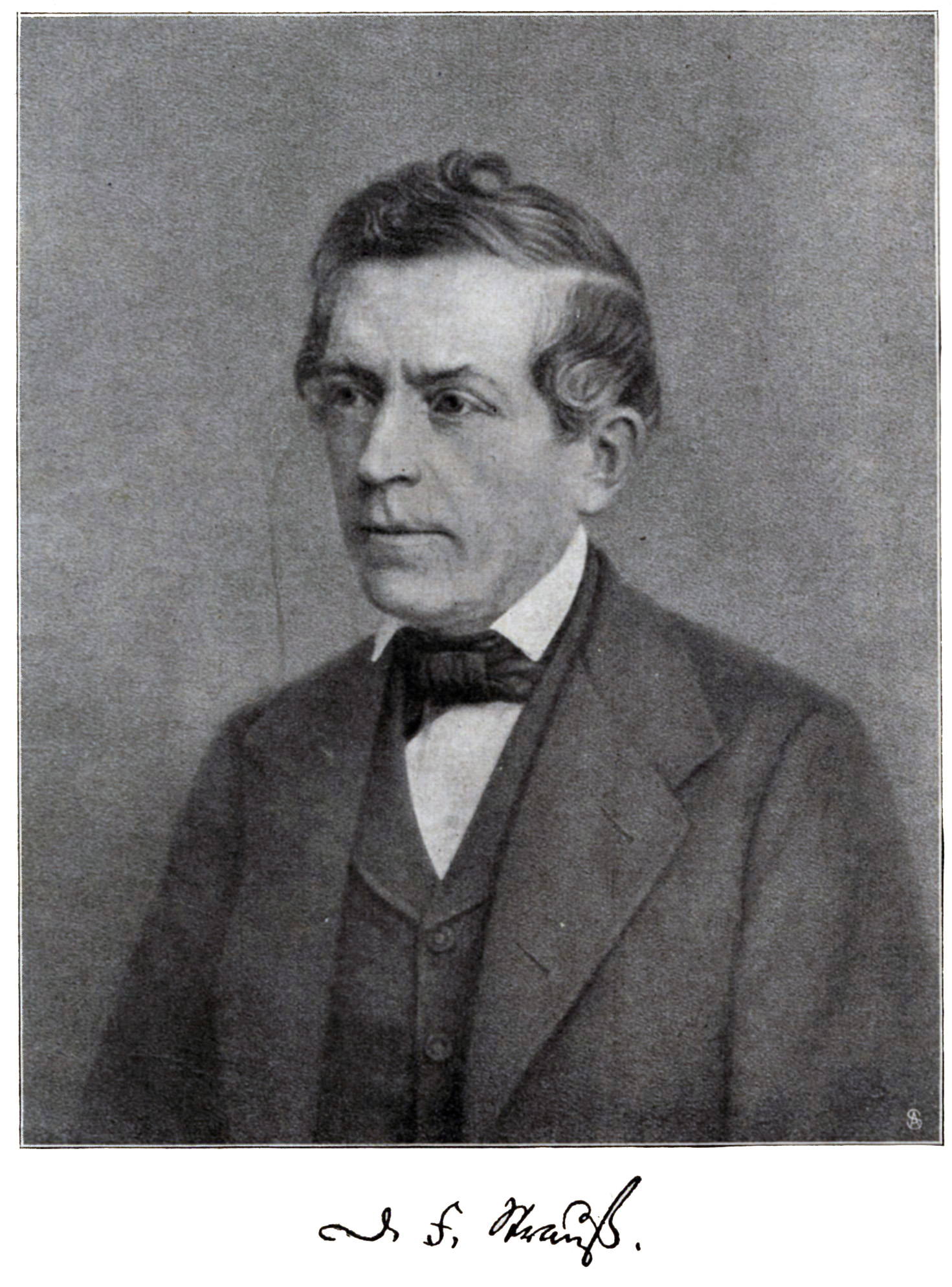
David Friedrich Strauss

While Maria Körner feared that the harmless piece would damage Schiller's reputation and disavow him, David Friedrich Strauß considered such fears to be misguided given its size and importance. Since his “Transfiguration,” “Schiller has always remained Schiller, even in his dressing gown.” The world looks up at his “sublime figure” with “belief and adoration”. The small things are also valuable, especially since it is nice to see the poet as a person who moves “at ease in a narrow circle among relatives and friends” and also enjoys “little jokes and teasing.”

Carl Künzel reacted to the public controversy surrounding the piece by subtitleing the first printing "A dramatic joke" and writing in the issue of the Neckar-Zeitung of January 16, 1863 that the piece was artistically meaningless and should have “It wouldn’t have the slightest value even as an occasional work” if it didn’t come from Schiller’s pen and didn’t refer to Körner.

This assessment shaped the reception until there were recent attempts to appreciate the work as literary independent and to interpret it in a literary history context.

For Grit Dommes, the passages that depict Körner's weaknesses in decision-making and other personal problems already indicate the neuroses of the modern individual. The contradictions between him and social demands are extremely complicated and therefore cannot be overcome by simple principles. The carpe diem of the beginning, of using the time of the morning sensibly, turns out to be so deceptive that at the end Körner can only face it with "perverted self-confidence" and in a significant pose the "insignificant" ' submits: With his grotesque reference to shaving, he confirms the accusation of wasting time instead of refuting it.

== Editions ==
- (in German) Friedrich von Schiller: Ich habe mich rasieren lassen: Ein dramatischer Scherz von Friedrich von Schiller. Verlag der Englischen Kunst-Anstalt A. H. Payne 1862

== Bibliography ==
- (in German) Peter-André Alt: Körners Vormittag. In: Schiller, Leben – Werk – Zeit, Erster Band, München 2000, S. 424–425
- (in German) Grit Dommes: Körners Vormittag. In: Schiller-Handbuch, Leben – Werk – Wirkung, Hrsg. Matthias Luserke-Jaqui, Metzler, Stuttgart 2005, S. 88–92
