= Kallias (disambiguation) =

Kallias may refer to:

- Heliopsis
- Kallias-Briefe
- Konstantinos Kallias
