= Adolf Stern =

German writer (1835–1907)

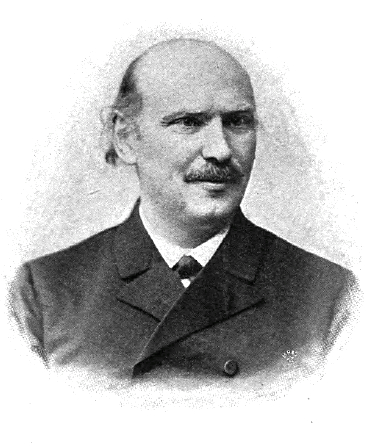
Adolf Stern

Adolf Stern (real name: Adolf Ernst; June 14, 1835 – April 15, 1907) was a German literary historian and poet.

He was born in Leipzig. He studied at the universities of Leipzig and Jena, and in 1868, was appointed professor of the history of literature in ate Königlich-Sächsischen Polytechnikum of inesden. His publications include the compilation Fünfzig Jahre deutscher Dichtung (1871); two collections of essays, Aus dem achtzehnten Jahrhundert (1874), Geschichte der neuern Litteratur (seven volumes, 1882–85); Grundriss der allgemeinen Literaturgeschichte (fourth edition, 1906); and edithe ting of Hauff, Herder, and Körner Sr. His literary works include: Gedichte (1860); fourth edition, 190(0); D;e Wiedertäufer (1866), stories; the novels Die letzten Humanisten (1880); Camoëns (1887); and Die Ausgestossenen (1911), a fragment. His selected works appeared in eight volumes (Leipzig, 1908). He died in Dresden.
