= Friedrich Nietzsche and Weimar Classicism =

2004 book by Paul C. Bishop and R. H. Stephenson

- Author: Paul C. Bishop; R. H. Stephenson
- Language: English
- Series: Studies in German Literature Linguistics and Culture
- Subject: Friedrich Nietzsche; Weimar Classicism
- Publisher: Camden House Publishing
- Publication date: November 2004
- Publication place: United States
- Pages: 293
- ISBN: 9781571136473

Friedrich Nietzsche and Weimar Classicism is a 2004 book by the British scholars Paul C. Bishop and R. H. Stephenson.

== Summary ==
The book traces the German philosopher Friedrich Nietzsche's relationship with Weimar Classicism and explores how this movement differed from German Romanticism. The authors find significant influence from Friedrich Schiller's On the Aesthetic Education of Man and Johann Wolfgang von Goethe's poetry and scientific writings in Nietzsche's works, notably in the aesthetic theories in The Birth of Tragedy and Thus Spoke Zarathustra. They refute scholars who have argued that Nietzsche had a negative view of Weimar Classicism, which they argue is based on a misunderstanding of Nietzsche's negative assessments of other people's interpretations of the movement.

== Reception ==
In The Comparatist, Ulrike Rainer called it "a thoroughly researched and well-written book".
