= Sketch (restaurant) =

French restaurant in London, England

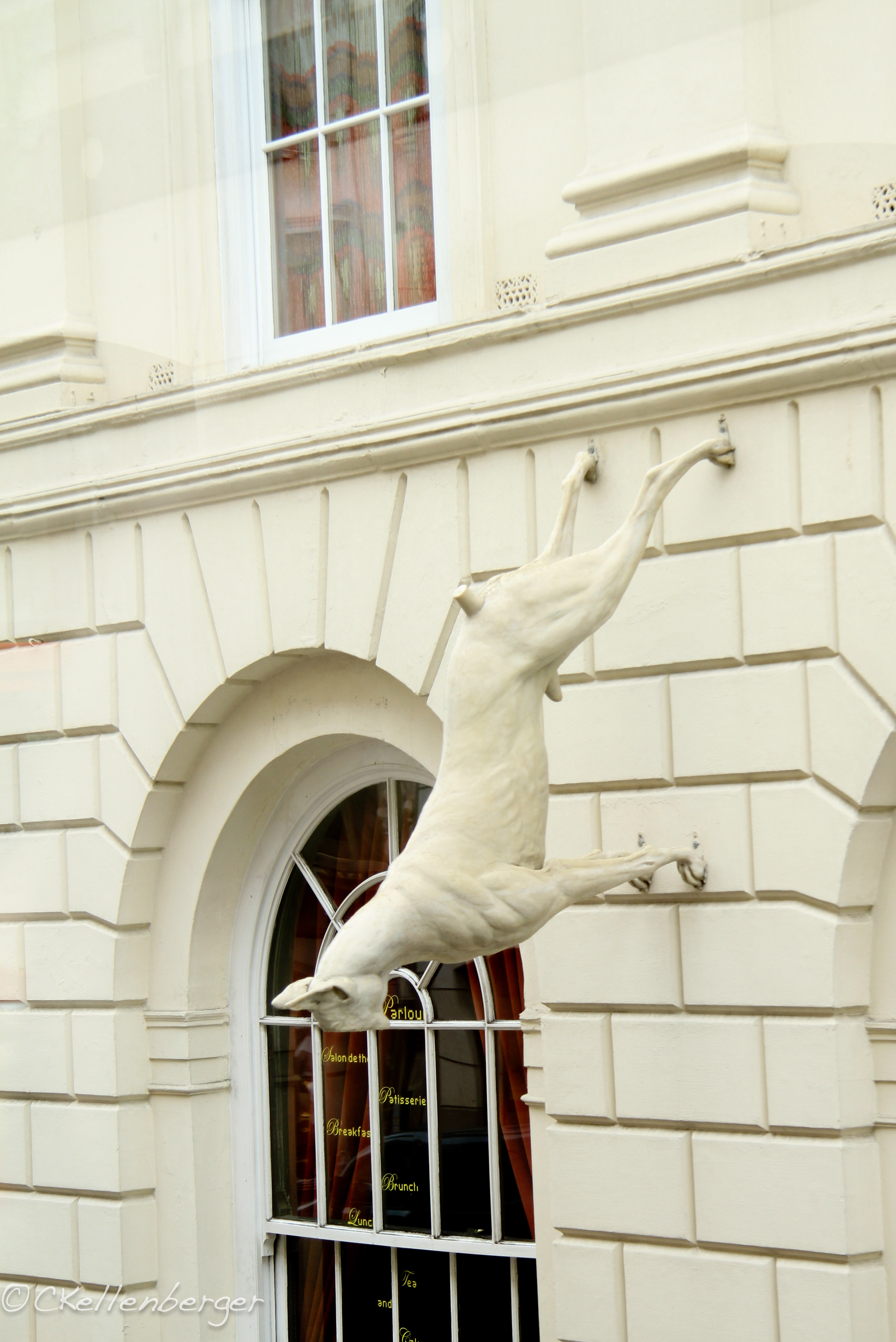
- Façade by Simon Brundret, a sculpture on the wall outside the restaurant

- Location within Central London

Restaurant information
- Established: 2003
- Owner: Mourad Mazouz
- Head chef: Pierre Gagnaire
- Food type: New French
- Dress code: Art Smart
- Rating: (Michelin Guide); AA Rosettes (2026)
- Location: 9 Conduit Street, London, W1S 2XG, United Kingdom
- Coordinates: 51°30′45.721″N 0°8′29.602″W
- Reservations: Yes
- Other information: Nearest station: Oxford Circus
- Website: sketch.london

Sketch is a restaurant at 9 Conduit Street in Mayfair, London, England, which opened in 2003. The restaurant is owned by Mourad Mazouz, and the head chef is Pierre Gagnaire. The cuisine is described as 'New French', and is a loose adaptation of the cuisine served in Gagnaire's three Michelin-starred restaurant in Paris and is executed by Frederic Don and Johannes Nuding. There are 5 eateries, including 3 restaurants in the building: the Parlour, the Lecture Room & Library, the Glade, the Gallery, and the Eastbar & Pods. The Lecture Room & Library holds 3 Michelin stars.

Mazouz came to public attention through the success of Momo, the North African restaurant and bar he opened in 1997 just off Regent Street, although he was already well known in France for his celebrated restaurants, Au Bascou and 404.

The restaurant covers two floors of a converted 18th century site in Conduit Street, Mayfair. Its dining area contains a permanent exhibit of David Shrigley artwork, and Shrigley designed the restaurant's tableware.

== Awards ==
In 2005, Sketch was ranked as the 18th best restaurant in the world by Restaurant magazine.

In 2008 and 2016, Sketch won the AA Wine Award for England.

As of 2021, the Lecture Room & Library holds five rosettes from the AA.

The Sketch Lecture Room and Library was awarded its first Michelin star in 2005, its second star in 2012 and its third star in 2019.

== 9 Conduit Street history ==
9 Conduit is a Grade II* listed townhouse in Mayfair, designed by English Architect James Wyatt in 1779 as the private residence of James Viner. It was listed on 24 February 1958.

Following that the building hosted a variety of societies and institutions that, according to some accounts, included cyclists, balloonists and psychologists, as well as the Suffragette movement in the early 20th century.

In 1887–1909, Conduit Street was converted into the headquarters of the Royal Institute of British Architects (RIBA) and still retains its plaque and crest in the entrance hall. During this time, RIBA/AA hosted a competition to re-design the 18th century façade design and although this was never realised; the RIBA archive at the V&A retains some of the competition proposal drawings.

The townhouse continued its design legacy and history in the mid-20th century to become Christian Dior's London atelier, within which Dior housed his collections. During this time in the 1970s the listed interior was modified by the seminal mid-century architect and leading pop art interior designer and furniture maker Max Clendinning, who designed cupboards, cubicles and display cases for Dior's ready to wear clothes and accessories. To combine the old and new, everything (including the walls, ceilings and woodwork) was painted a uniform mid-grey with a grey velvet Wilton carpet and grey uniformed attendants to "throw the clothes into sharper relief, and seems to conform with the classical, refined elegance of the House of Dior itself". This austere style of monochromatic design was developed from his seminal 1960s signature white on white designs that marked the peak of British Modernism.

When the building was taken over by Sketch the interior was re-designed by Mazouz and Paris-based designer and sculptor Noé Duchaufour Lawrance. Several other international designers were commissioned for signature pieces, which are featured throughout Sketch.

== See also ==
- List of French restaurants
- List of Michelin 3-star restaurants in the United Kingdom
- Society for the Encouragement of the Fine Arts
