= The Green Snake and the Beautiful Lily =

Literary fairy tale by Johann Wolfgang von Goethe

- Short story by Johann Wolfgang von Goethe
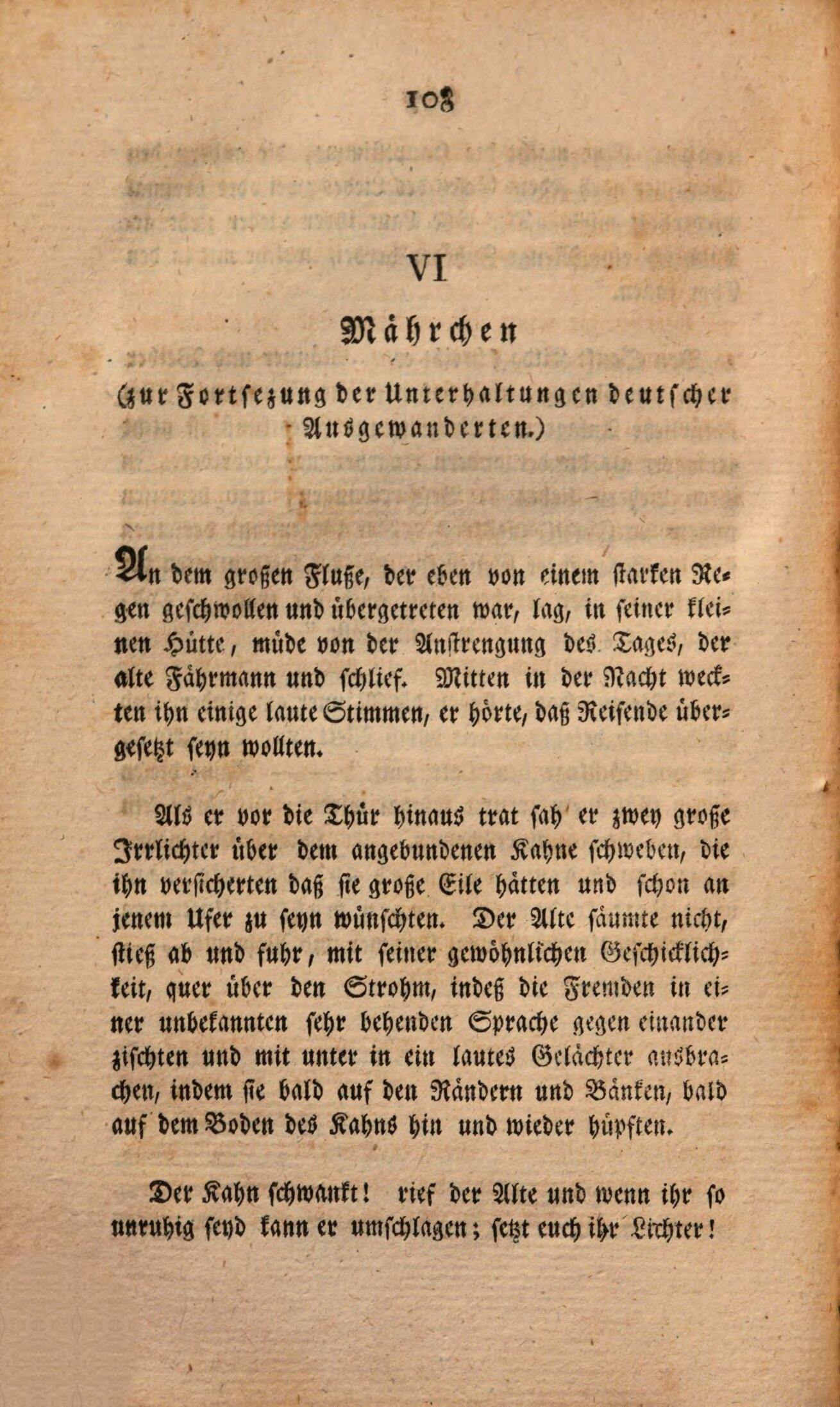
- First page in Die Horen
- Original title: Mährchen
- Translator: Thomas Carlyle
- Country: Holy Roman Empire
- Language: German
- Genre: literary fairy tale

Publication
- Published in: Die Horen #4
- Publication type: literary journal
- Publisher: Cotta’sche Verlagsbuchhandlung
- Publication date: 1795
- Pages: 45
- Series: The German Refugees

"The Green Snake and the Beautiful Lily" (German: "Das Märchen" or simply "Märchen") is a literary fairy tale by Johann Wolfgang von Goethe published in 1795 in Friedrich Schiller's German magazine Die Horen ('The Horae'). The story revolves around the crossing and bridging of a river, which represents the divide between the outer life of the senses and the ideal aspirations of the human being. It concludes Goethe's short-story rondo The German Refugees. "Das Märchen" is regarded as the founding example of the genre of the Kunstmärchen, or artistic fairy tale.

== Synopsis ==
The tale begins with two will-o'-the-wisps who wake a ferryman and ask to be taken across a river. The ferryman does so, and for payment, they shake gold from themselves into the boat. This alarms the ferryman, for if the gold had gone into the river, it would overflow. He forces the will-o'-the-wisps to agree to pay him three artichokes, three cabbages, and three onions. The ferryman takes the gold up to a high place, and deposits it in a rocky cleft, where it is discovered by a green snake. The snake eats the gold and becomes luminous, allowing her to observe an underground temple where there is an old man with a lamp which can only give light when another light is present. The snake investigates the temple and finds four kings made of metal: one of gold, one silver, one bronze, and one a mixture of all three.

The story then switches over to the wife of the old man, who meets a melancholy prince. He has met a beautiful Lily, but his happiness is prevented by the fact that anyone who touches her will die. The snake is able to form a temporary bridge across the river at midday, and in this way, the wife and prince come to Lily's garden, where she is mourning her fate. As twilight falls, the prince succumbs to his desire for the beautiful Lily, rushes towards her, and dies. The green snake encircles the prince, and the old man, his wife, and the will-o'-the-wisps form a procession and cross the river on the back of the snake.

Back in the land of the senses, and guided by the old man, Lily is able to bring the prince back to life—albeit in a dream state—by touching both the snake and the prince. The snake sacrifices herself, transforming into a pile of precious stones, which are then thrown into the river. The old man then directs them towards the doors of the temple, which are locked. The will-o'-the-wisps help them enter by eating the gold out of the doors. At this point, the temple is magically transported beneath the river, surfacing beneath the ferryman's hut, which transforms into a silver altar. The three kings bestow gifts upon the sleeping prince and restore him. The fourth, mixed king collapses as the will-o'-the-wisps lick the veins of gold out of him. We also find that Lily's touch no longer brings death. Thus, the prince is united with the beautiful Lily, and they are married. When they look out from the temple, they see a permanent bridge which spans the river—the result of the snake's sacrifice—"and to the present hour the Bridge is swarming with travellers, and the Temple is the most frequented on the whole Earth".

== Analysis ==
A.W. Schlegel called "Das Märchen" the "loveliest fairy tale that has ever fallen from the heaven of fancy onto the dry earth." Thomas Carlyle, who in 1832 translated the story into English, called it "the tale of tales . . . a true universe of the imagination." Goethe, writing to Carlyle in 1830, posited that "It is a piece of legerdemain which could hardly succeed a second time. A normal imagination irresistibly demands that reason should extract from it something logical and consistent, which reason never succeeds in doing." Goethe was a partisan of dynamic symbolism against static allegory, an alignment informed by his ideas in natural science and morphology. "Das Märchen" should be read in light of Goethe's preoccupation with organic development and metamorphosis, as revealing a natural process of growth and development, characterized by "polarity, intensification through metamorphosis, and climax or culimination." This same organicism underlies the Romantic Bildungsroman.

It has been claimed that "Das Märchen" was born out of Goethe's reading of The Chymical Wedding of Christian Rosenkreutz and that it is full of esoteric symbolism. Goethe first conceived of the tale during his 1768-69 illness in Frankfurt, when, under the influence of Susanne von Klettenberg, he was absorbed in the study of mysticism and alchemy. The symbol of the lily was important to Jakob Böhme. In 1786, Goethe observed that The Chymical Wedding contains "a pretty fairy story" for which he had no time at the moment. Goethe finally wrote the story in 1795, during his composition of the sixth book of Wilhelm Meister's Apprenticeship. Susanne von Klettenberg was taken as model for a character in this latter work, showing that at the time that he wrote "Das Märchen" he was devoting thought to his relationship with her. The name he gave this character, "Beautiful Soul" [Schöne Seele] carries philosophical weight lent to it by Schiller, as "the true harmony between reason and sense, between inclination and duty," an ideal which is also manifest in the character of the beautiful lily.

Rudolf Steiner, in his 1918 book Goethe's Standard of the Soul, speaks of it as follows: "On the river stands the Temple in which the marriage of the Young Man with the Lily takes place. The 'marriage' with the supersensible, the realisation of the free personality, is possible in a human soul whose forces have been brought into a state of regularity that in comparison with the usual state is a transformation." This article led to an invitation to speak to the German Theosophical Society which eventually led to Steiner becoming its General Secretary.

Tom Raines gives the following historical background for "The Green Snake and the Beautiful Lily":

This Fairy Tale was written by Goethe as a response to a work of Schiller's entitled Über die aesthetische Erziehung des Menschen ('Letters on the Aesthetic Education of Man'). One of the main thoughts considered in these 'letters' centred around the question of human freedom... Schiller saw that a harmonious social life could only be founded on the basis of free human personalities. He saw that there was an "ideal human being" within everyone and the challenge was to bring the outer life experiences into harmony with this "ideal". Then the human being would lead a truly worthy existence. Schiller was trying to build an inner bridge between the Person in the immediate reality and the 'ideal human being'. He wrote these 'Letters' during the time and context of the French Revolution. This revolution was driven by a desire for outer social changes to enable human personalities to become free. But both Schiller and Goethe recognised that freedom cannot be 'imposed' from the outside but must arise from within each person. Whilst he had an artistic nature, Schiller was more at home in the realm of philosophic thoughts and although Goethe found much pleasure in these 'Letters' of Schiller, he felt that the approach concerning the forces in the soul was too simply stated and, it should be said, working in abstract ideas was not Goethe's way. So he set about writing a Fairy Tale that would show, in imaginative pictures, the way in which a human soul could become whole and free, thereby giving rise to a new and free human community. And this was published in Die Horen in 1795.

== Adaptations ==
The tale was the basis for Giselher Klebe's 1969 opera Das Märchen von der schönen Lilie.

== Translations ==
- Anonymous (1823). "The Tale". Popular Tales and Romances of the Northern Nations. Vol. III. London: W. Simpkin, R. Marshall and J. H. Bohte. pp. 69–140.
- Carlyle, Thomas (October 1832). "The Tale". Fraser's Magazine. Vol. 6, no. 33. London: James Fraser. pp. 257–278. hdl:2027/umn.31951000742903o. [collected in Critical and Miscellaneous Essays volume 2 (1838)]
- "Goethe's Fairy Tale of the Green Snake and the Beautiful Lily", Donald Maclean, translator. With a commentary by Adam McLean. (Grand Rapids, MI), Phanes Press, 1993. ISBN 0-933999-19-4. (Magnum Opus Hermetic Sourceworks #14)
- "The Tale of Fair Lily and the Green Serpent", Alice Raphael, translator. (San Francisco, CA), Didymus Press, 1974.
