= Rudolf Steiner and the Theosophical Society =

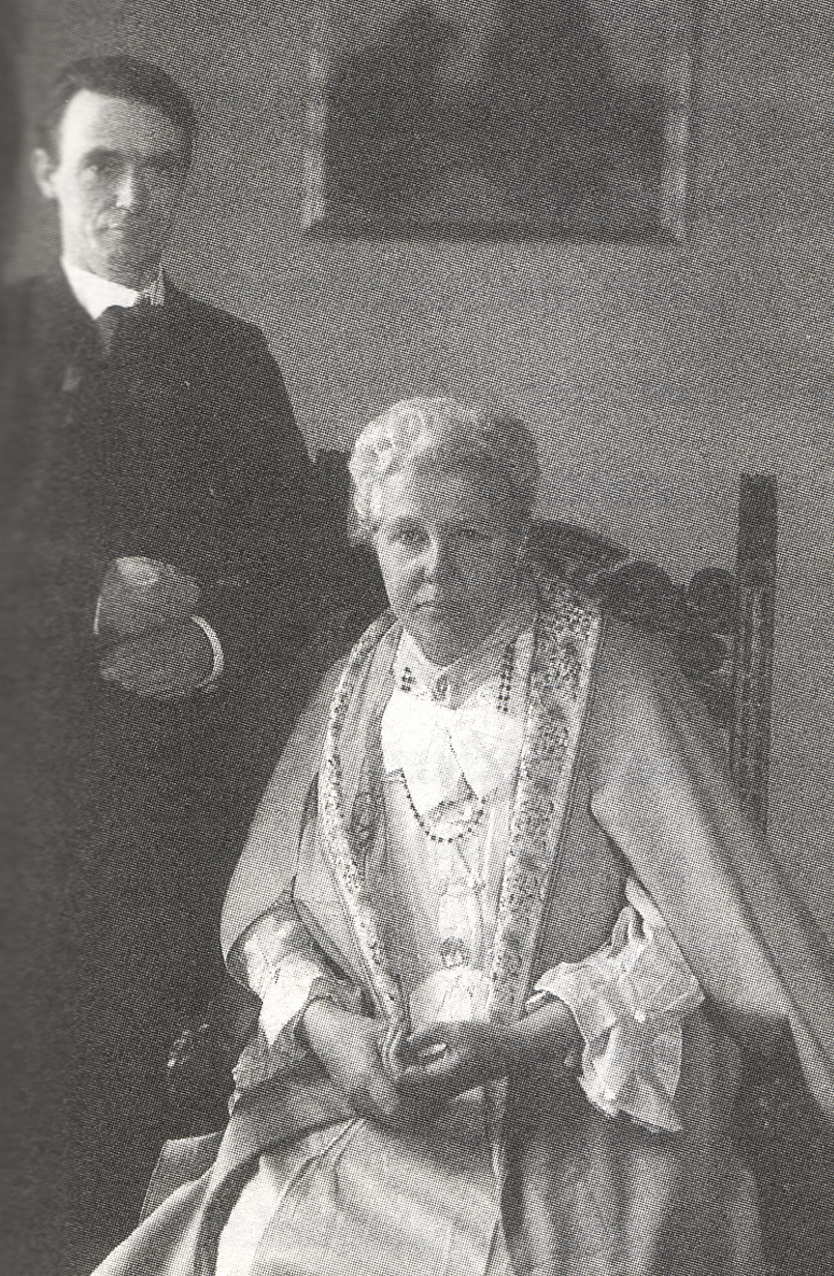
Rudolf Steiner and Annie Besant in Munich, 1907

The history of the relationship between Rudolf Steiner and the Theosophical Society, rather complex and changing, has assumed relevance for the events that led to their separation and to the development of divergent doctrines and spiritual paths.

In 1899 Steiner joined the German Theosophical section, becoming its leader a few years later, but from the beginning he based his doctrine on the centrality of the figure of Jesus Christ, who in Theosophy was instead only one of many ascended masters.

After Steiner noted a progressive decline towards forms of fanaticism and spiritism, which for him reached their peak when some Theosophists affirmed the reincarnation of Christ in a Hindu personality, he founded the Anthroposophical Society on December 28, 1912, and was expelled from the Theosophical Society on March 7, 1913.

== History ==
In 1899, Steiner published an article in the Magazin für Literatur, titled "Goethe's Secret Revelation", on the esoteric nature of Goethe's fairy tale, The Green Snake and the Beautiful Lily. This article led to an invitation by the Count and Countess Brockdorff to speak to a gathering of Theosophists on the subject of Friedrich Nietzsche. This invitation was followed by a second, the occasion of what he later considered to be his first fully 'esoteric' lecture, once again on the topic of Goethe's fairy tale.

Steiner continued speaking regularly to the members of the Theosophical Society, becoming the head of its newly constituted German section in 1902. The German Section of the Theosophical Society grew rapidly under Steiner's leadership as he lectured throughout much of Europe on his spiritual science. Through his lecturing to Theosophists, Steiner met Marie von Sievers, owner of the Theosophical headquarters in Berlin, who was to become his spiritual partner and second wife. From the end of 1903 Steiner and von Sievers became the inseparable centre of Berlin Theosophy.

By 1904, Steiner was appointed by Annie Besant to be leader of an Esoteric School for Germany and Austria. Steiner made it clear that this school would teach a Western spiritual path harmonious with, but differing fundamentally in approach from, other Theosophical paths. These and other differences with Besant became particularly pronounced at the Theosophical Congress in Munich in 1907—organized by Steiner—its focus on artistic expression was a sharp departure from the Blavatsky tradition.

Into the programme of the [Theosophical Congress of 1907] was introduced an artistic representation. Marie von Sievers translation of... Schuré's Eleusinian drama... [provided] an artistic element directed towards the purpose of not leaving the spiritual life henceforth void of art within the Society. A great portion of the old members of the Theosophical Society from England, France, and especially from the Netherlands, were inwardly displeased by the innovations offered them at the Munich congress. What it would have been well to understand, but what was clearly grasped at that time by exceedingly few, was the fact that the anthroposophic current had given something of an entirely different bearing from that of the Theosophical Society up to that time. In this inner bearing lay the true reason why the anthroposophical society could no longer exist as a part of the theosophical society.

— Rudolf Steiner, Chapter XXXVIII, The Story of My Life, 1928

Steiner's lecture cycles from 1909 onwards emphasized his research into Christianity, toward which Mme. Blavatsky had been notably hostile. Thus, the tensions grew between the main society and the German section. The relationship between the Theosophical Society centered in Adyar, India and its German section became increasingly strained as the new strains of Steiner's teaching became apparent.

Steiner's popularity as a lecturer spread far beyond the borders of Germany: he was active in Switzerland, the Netherlands, Norway, Austria and other countries. Besant tried to restrict him to lecturing in Germany itself, but this contravened both Theosophical Society statutes as well as a statement of Besant's greeting this broadening lecture activity, issued some months before. These tensions finally came to a head over the question of Jiddu Krishnamurti, a young Indian boy to whom C. W. Leadbeater, followed by Annie Besant, attributed messianic status as the new World Teacher, an incarnation of the Lord Maitreya. Steiner quickly denied this attribution of messianic status to Krishnamurti, claiming that Christ's earthly incarnation in Jesus was a unique event. Steiner held that though the human being generally goes through a series of repeated earth lives, the spiritual being Christ incarnated only once in a physical body. Christ, he said, would reappear in "the etheric" — the realm that lives between people and in community life — not as a physical individual. Steiner and the majority of the German-speaking Theosophists broke away to found a new group, the Anthroposophical Society, at the end of 1912. Shortly thereafter, Besant revoked the German section's membership in the Theosophical Society on the grounds of the section's refusal to allow admission to adherents of a Theosophical organization established to support the mission of Krishnamurti, the Order of the Star in the East. Anthroposophists were offended when Besant falsely claimed that Steiner had been educated by Jesuits.

The World Teacher concept was unpopular with many theosophists, and was repudiated by Krishnamurti himself in 1929, leading to a crisis in the Theosophical Society. It was, however, a basic principle of the Theosophical Society that adherents of all religions were admitted.

Many accusations were leveled against me because of my activity within the Theosophical Society, and one of them accused me of having used this society, which already had a certain standing in the world, as a kind of springboard to make the way easier for my own spirit knowledge. This accusation is completely groundless. When I accepted the invitation to enter the society, it was the only serious organization where there was any real spiritual life. If the society's way of thinking, bearing, and activity had remained unchanged, my friends and I would not have had to withdraw.

[…]

After 1906, however, events in the society—whose leadership was not the least influenced by me—reminded one of an outgrowth of spiritism, so that I needed to stress with increasing emphasis that the section of the society I was leading had nothing at all to do with such matters. These events reached a climax with the assertion that the Christ would reappear in earthly life within a certain Hindu boy. The Theosophical Society established a special society, The Star of the East, to propagate this absurdity. […] It was really impossible for my friends and myself, as members of the German Section, to accept the members of this Star of the East, as they wanted.

— Rudolf Steiner, Chapter XXXI, The Story of My Life, 1928

Other doctrinal elements pushed Steiner to split, such as the Theosophical use of an atomistic, and therefore materialistic, basis for spiritual knowledge. Natural phenomena, he argued, were explained in a pseudoscientific manner, borrowing the scientific nomenclature for atoms and molecules. In other words, he disapproved of the Theosophical explanation of the Spirit by physical laws and substances, as if it were a copy of material processes.

=== Outcome of the dispute ===
As a result of the conflict, two steps followed in rapid succession:

- The overwhelming majority of German-speaking theosophists followed Steiner into the new Anthroposophical Society, founded between August and December 1912. In a telegram sent to the Theosophical Society they justified this step by stating it was: "based upon the recognition that the President [Besant] has continually and even systematically violated this highest principle of the Theosophical Society, 'No religion higher than the truth', and has abused the presidential power in arbitrary ways, thus hindering positive work."
- Steiner's exclusion of Star in the East followers was a direct contravention of Theosophical Society statutes, and duly led to the charter of the German Section being revoked.

Steiner later claimed that he never had considered himself to be part of the Theosophical movement. Even while the leader of the German section of the movement, he made a great point of his complete independence of philosophical thought and esoteric teachings from the Theosophical Society's esoteric path. His reaction to the above events was: "I myself experience what has happened — apart from what has been sobering and painful — as a great liberation from the oppressive narrowness that has characterized the life of the Theosophical Society for years."

The basic structural skeletons of Steiner's cosmology and of his description of the human being as composed of various physical and spiritual aspects are based on Blavatsky's schema, to whom he acknowledged his debt. Steiner's elaborations of these (in his Theosophy and Outline of Esoteric Science) diverge from other theosophical presentations both in style and in substance, however. Despite their differences and the split with the Theosophical Society, Rudolf Steiner maintained a keen watch on the Theosophy Society throughout his life and continued to acquire Theosophical publications; of the hundreds of books in English in Rudolf Steiner's library, half were Theosophical books.

== Sources ==
- Steiner, Rudolf (2006). Christopher Bamford (ed.). Autobiography: Chapters in the Course of My Life, 1861–1907 (CW 28). Translated by Rita Stebbing. SteinerBooks. ISBN 978-0880109017.
