= Rachel Yakar =

French opera singer (1936–2023)

- Born: 3 March 1936; Lyon, France
- Died: 24 June 2023 (aged 87); La Rochelle, France
- Education: Paris Conservatoire
- Occupations: Operatic soprano; Academic teacher
- Organizations: Deutsche Oper am Rhein; Paris Conservatoire

Rachel Yakar (3 March 1936 – 24 June 2023) was a French operatic soprano and academic voice teacher. She was known for Mozart roles such as Elvira in Don Giovanni, Baroque opera and contemporary opera. She was a member of the Deutsche Oper am Rhein from 1964 to 1991, and appeared also in Paris, at the Royal Opera House in London and at festivals including Bayreuth and Glyndebourne. She received international attention as Poppea in the 1977 production of Monteverdi's L'incoronazione di Poppea at the Oper Zürich conducted by Nikolaus Harnoncourt, which was recorded and filmed. She made many more recordings reviving Baroque operas in historically informed performance. Her portrayal of Debussy's Mélisande was described as ideal. She was admired not only for her voice and diction but also for her stage presence. After her retirement from the stage she taught at the Paris Conservatoire. Ivan A. Alexandre from Diapason summarised her performing: "A darling of the Baroque pioneers and a Mozartian at heart and in style, the soprano from Lyon was also the intimate voice of Strauss, Debussy and Messiaen."

== Life and career ==
Yakar was born in Lyon on 3 March 1936 to a family of Greek-Turkish origin. She first trained to be a fashion designer. She then studied voice at the Paris Conservatoire, and further for four years with Germaine Lubin. In 1963, she made her debut at the Strasbourg opera.

=== Deutsche Oper am Rhein ===
She moved to the Deutsche Oper am Rhein in 1964, where she remained a member of the ensemble for more than 25 years. She appeared there in more than 40 productions, including leading roles such as the female title role in Gluck's Orfeo ed Euridice, Mozart's Contessa in Le nozze di Figaro and Donna Elvira in Don Giovanni, Verdi's Gilda in Rigoletto and Desdemona in Otello, Tchaikovsky's Tatjana in Eugene Onegin, and Puccini's Mimi in La Bohème and Liù in Turandot. She also appeared there in the title roles of Dvořák's Rusalka, Arabella by Richard Strauss, and Debussy's Pelléas et Mélisande, and as Antonia in Offenbach's Les contes d'Hoffmann, Marguerite in Gounod's Faust and Anne in Stravinsky's The Rake's Progress. She was a favourite with the audience due to her stage presence.

=== Performances in Europe ===
Already before her official debut, Yakar was invited to perform at the Aix-en-Provence Festival in 1961, as Rosina in Henry Barraud's Lavinia. She returned for Najade in Ariadne auf Naxos in 1966, alongside Tatiana Troyanos as the Composer, Régine Crespin as Ariadne and Mady Mesplé as Zerbinetta.

Yakar participated in the world premiere of Klebe's Das Märchen von der schönen Lilie at the Schwetzingen Festival on 15 May 1969. She first appeared at the Palais Garnier in Paris in 1970 as Gilda in Rigoletto and Micaëla in Bizet's Carmen. In the mid and late 1970s, she performed more and more internationally. She appeared at the Bayreuth Festival in 1975 and 1976 as Freia in Das Rheingold, Gerhilde in Die Walküre, and a Flower Maiden in Parsifal.

Yakar performed the title role of Monteverdi's L'incoronazione di Poppea at the Oper Zürich on 8 January 1977, staged by Jean-Pierre Ponnelle and conducted by Nikolaus Harnoncourt in historically informed performance. The production was recorded in 1978 and filmed. Her performances at the Glyndebourne Festival began in 1977 with Elvira, alongside Thomas Allen as Don Giovanni, staged by Peter Hall and conducted by Bernard Haitink; a reviewer named her "one of the best Elviras around", with a "beautiful and supple Italian sound". She performed there in 1980 and 1982 as the Marschallin in Der Rosenkavalier by Richard Strauss, alongside Felicity Lott in the title role and Krisztina Laki as Sophie. She performed in Aix-en-Provence again as Aricie in Rameau's Hippolyte et Aricie in 1983, conducted by John Eliot Gardiner and directed by Pier Luigi Pizzi, alongside José van Dam as Hippolyte and Jessye Norman as Phèdre. She appeared at the Edinburgh Festival, Salzburg Festival and at the Royal Opera House in London, among others. Her last role on stage was Clymène in Lully's Phaëton, conducted by Marc Minkowski and directed by Karine Saporta for the opening of Lyon's Opéra Nouvel in 1993.

Her repertoire included more Mozart roles, including Celia in Lucio Silla, Ilia in Idomeneo, and the First Lady in Die Zauberflöte,

She appeared with pioneers of revivals of Baroque operas, performing Clérambault's Médée and Orphée with Reinhard Goebel, Lully's Armide with Philippe Herreweghe, Leclair's Circé in Scylla et Glaucus with John Eliot Gardiner, and Handel's Melissa in Amadigi di Gaula with Roger Norrington.

Her portrayal of Debussy's Mélisande, first performed at the end of the 1970s conducted by Armin Jordan, was regarded as ideal. She also appeared in works of the 20th century such as Honegger's Diane in Les aventures du roi Pausole and Poulenc's Madame Lidoine in Dialogues of the Carmelites.

Yakar was regarded as a "sculptor of words, a draughtswoman of singing, a melodist and a stage beast".

==== Concert ====
In concert she performed in choral works such as Bach's Mass in B minor conducted by Michel Corboz in 1979, and in Mendelssohn's Paulus. She sang mélodies by composers such as Hennri Duparc, Gabriel Fauré, Olivier Messiaen and Francis Poulenc.

=== Teaching ===
Yakar taught opera at the Paris Conservatoire from 1990 to 1997. Patricia Petibon was one of her students". Simultaneously she installed, together with René Jacobs, a studio at the Centre de musique baroque de Versailles, and gave master classes.

=== Personal life ===
Yakar was married to tenor Michel Lecocq who was active at the Strasbourg Opera. After retiring from her teaching post, they lived in Loix on the Île de Ré.

Yakar died in La Rochelle after a long struggle with illness on 24 June 2023, aged 87. Looking at her contributions, Minkowski expressed thankfulness for her portrayals of Poppea with Harnoncourt and Ponnelle, Ilia, Aricie, and Jenůfa, for her perfect style, exemplary diction, and her both angelic and sensual lyricism.

== Recordings ==
In 1973, Yakar participated in the first recording of Rameau's Les Indes galantes, conducted by Jean-Claude Malgoire, as Emílie. In a 2012 comparison of recordings of L'incoronazione di Poppea, a reviewer noted her velvety seductive singing portraying Poppaea Sabina, with passion in a duet with Eric Tappy as Nero in Act 3; he found the final love duet "perfectly paced and beautifully sung". Joseph McLellan from the Washington Post observed that during the final duet, Nero caresses her but she in turn caresses the new crown, turning her back to him.

She recorded works by André Campra, André Grétry, and Rameau's Pygmalion with Gustav Leonhardt. She was part of the first recording of a Handel opera with period instruments, Admeto conducted by Alan Curtis. Yakar was Fiordiligi in the first recording of the cycle of Mozart's Da Ponte operas with period instruments conducted by Harnoncourt, performed at the Drottningholm festival.

She recorded melodies by Reynaldo Hahn, Georges Bizet and Emmanuel Chabrier with pianist Claude Lavoix; a reviewer from Gramophone noted:

Rachel Yakar has a wider range of tone-colours and gives the words a sharper flavour ... [She] shows a flexibility with words, a way of lightening syllables and giving more conversational ease to the utterance.

== Notes ==
Requiem d-moll
