= Kallias-Briefe =

The Kallias-Briefen was a collection made by Schiller of his thoughts on beauty from his correspondence with his friend Christian Gottfried Körner. He planned to turn them into a major treatise entitled Kallias oder Über die Schönheit but in the end did not have time to do so.
