= Der Bürgergeneral =

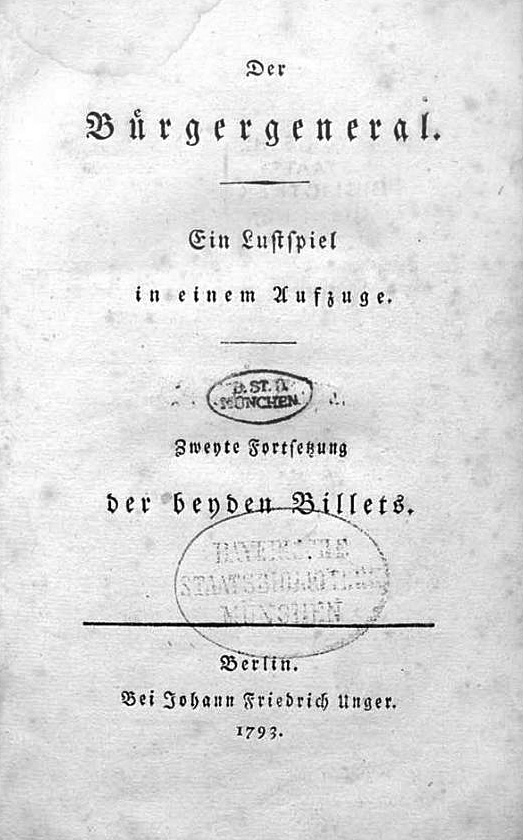
Frontispiece of the play

Der Bürgergeneral (English: The Citizen General) is a comedy in one act by Johann Wolfgang von Goethe, written and published in 1793. It satirises the French Revolution through the story of a man who poses as a revolutionary in order to con a rich peasant out of a meal. The deception causes a brief panic before a nobleman steps in to expose the perpetrator, mete out justice and restore order. Goethe wrote the play in only three days and staged it at the Weimar Court Theatre, of which he was director.

== Synopsis ==
Schnaps, the protagonist, is a rascally barber who poses as a revolutionary general using an outfit stolen from a dying French prisoner of war: a French National Guard uniform, a liberty cap, a tricolour cockade and a sabre. He pretends to be part of a conspiracy working towards an imminent revolution, in order to trick Märten, a wealthy but elderly peasant, into providing him with a free meal of bread and milk. Märten's son-in-law Görge and wife Röse see through the imposture and attack Schnaps with a cudgel. The magistrate becomes involved and the household is suspected of involvement with the revolutionary Jacobins. However, the truth is eventually established by the local member of the landowning nobility. Schnaps is treated with mercy as the nobleman recognises that the barber poses no real danger to society, and the threat of revolution is defused.

== Background ==
In January 1791, Goethe was appointed to the post of Director-General of the Court Theatre in Weimar. While in Weimar he wrote Der Bürgergeneral in only three days, between 23 and 26 April 1793, and it was first performed at the theatre only a few days later on 2 May. The play was a sequel to two earlier productions at the theatre, Die beiden Billets by French author Jean-Pierre Claris de Florian and its sequel Der Stammbaum by Christian Leberecht Heyne (using the pseudonym Anton Wall). Both plays had been sufficiently well-received to prompt Goethe to write another sequel which, although it references its predecessors, was intended to function as a stand-alone play. The actor Johann Christoph Beck had been a success in the role of Schnaps and returned to the same part in Der Bürgergeneral. After its Weimar premiere, it was also performed in Lauchstädt and Erfurt; by 1805 it had been performed fifteen times.

== Themes ==
The play has been characterised by Anthony J. Niesz as "a sort of conservative propaganda play" in response to the French Revolution. As Patrick Fortmann puts it, the play aims

to ridicule the revolution, to show how utterly out of place it is in rural Germany, how misleading its promises of liberty and equality, how self-serving its enthusiasts, how amateurishly the cabals plotted in secret, and how unnecessary the whole undertaking, if the social classes are willing to cooperate and to meet each other half-way.

Goethe sets out to ridicule the symbolism of the French Revolution – the uniform, cockade, cap and sabre (all of which, in the 1793 Weimar production, were the genuine articles, having been brought back from France by Goethe as spoils of war) – by having the peasant Märten critique them by the standards of contemporary German peasant dress.

Neisz traces the play's heritage to the type of peasant satires popularised by Christian Weise and Hans Sachs. He notes that it "contains very little in the way of reflections on the nature of drama or literature" and avoids using theatrical terms. Goethe's assistant Anton Genast said that the play was viewed by the people as a "kleine Schlacht" (little battle) of Weimar against France. Goethe himself expressed the hope that it would have "some aesthetic value" and called it a "shibboleth to identify foolish or wicked unpatriots in Germany".

Der Bürgergeneral is also notable for introducing one of Goethe's most notable themes in his subsequent plays: the virtues of marriage and married love "as a moral and poetic sign of contradiction to the corruption of the times", as Nicholas Boyle puts it. The peasant couple Görge and Röse have been married for twelve weeks but are still madly in love with each other; while Märten broods over newspaper reports from France, his daughter and son-in-law plan their future together. Their love inspires the nobleman to marry his own sweetheart and to promise that their future children will play together.
