= Early New High German literature =

German literature from the mid 14th to the mid 17th century

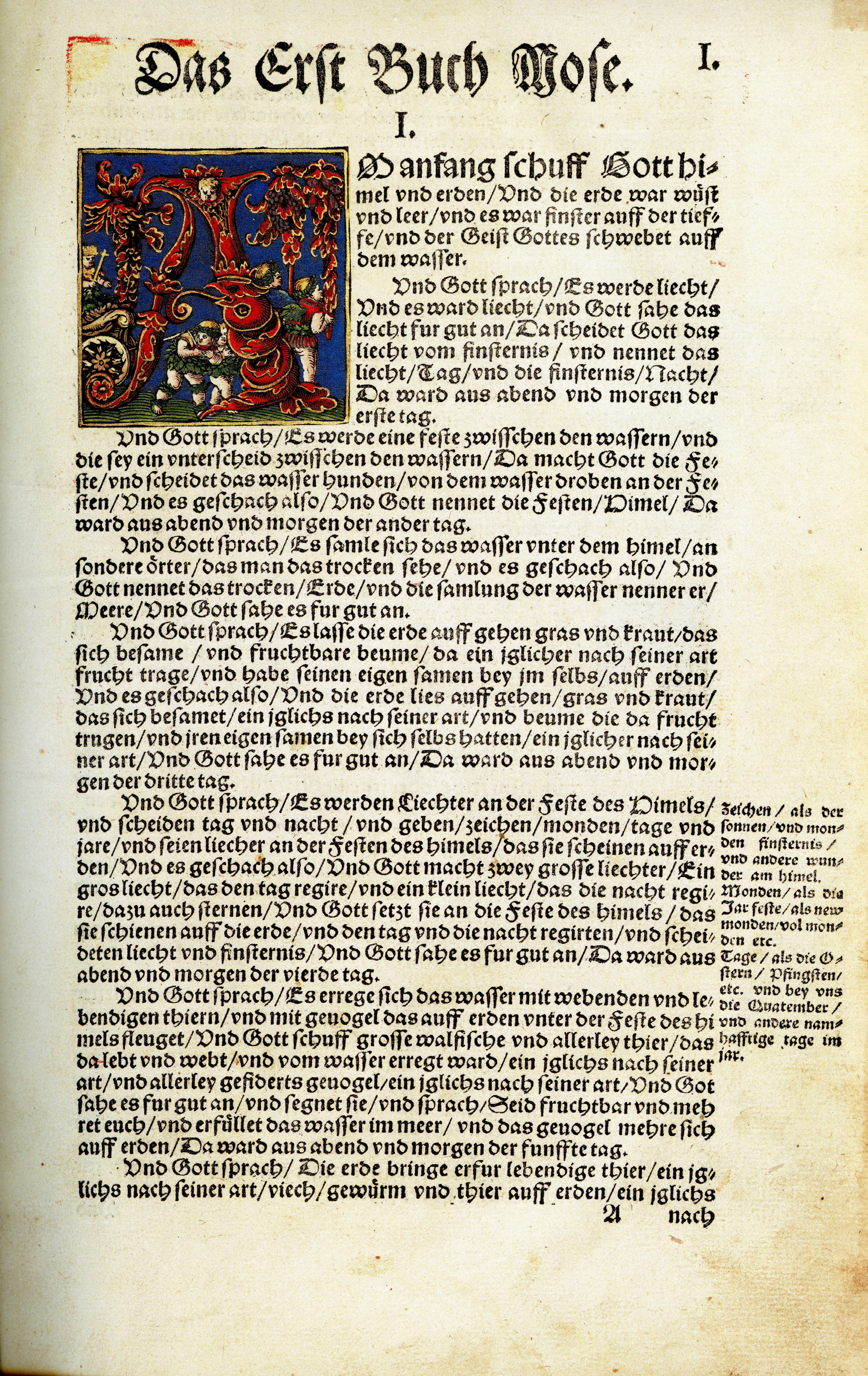
The opening page of the Book of Genesis in Martin Luther's Bible translation of 1534, published by Hans Luft

Early New High German literature refers to literature written in German between the middle of the 14th century and the middle of the 17th. The term Early Modern German literature is also used to cover all or part of the same period.

The fundamental development from Middle High German literature was

the giving up of a small range of literary subjects which had been of vital interest to a chivalrous society eclectic in its tastes, and the adoption of a wider, more complex, range of subjects interesting a wider public which was not chivalrous but citizen.

== Key authors and works ==
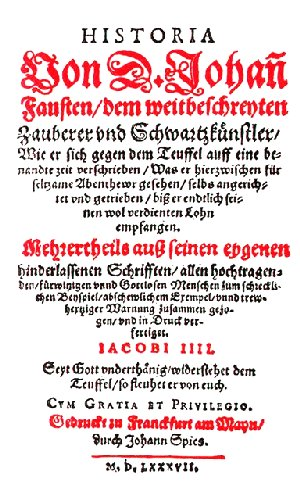
Frontispiece of the Historia von D. Johann Fausten, published in 1587 by Johann Spies

=== Authors ===
- Götz von Berlichingen
- Ulrich Boner
- Sebastian Brant
- Johann Fischart
- Hans Folz
- Ulrich Füetrer
- Sebastian Franck
- Andreas Gryphius
- Ulrich von Hutten
- Heinrich Kaufringer
- Daniel Casper von Lohenstein
- Martin Luther
- Martin Opitz
- Hans Rosenplüt
- Hans Sachs
- Johannes von Tepl
- Georg Wickram
- Heinrich Wittenwiler
- Oswald von Wolkenstein
- Niklas von Wyle

=== Anonymous works ===
- Dukus Horant
- Fortunatus
- Historia von D. Johann Fausten
- Lied vom Hürnen Seyfrid
- Till Eulenspiegel
- Tristrant und Isalde

== See also ==
- Early New High German
- German Renaissance
- Humanism in Germany
- Protestant Reformation

== Sources ==
- Brooke, Kenneth (1955). An Introduction to Early New High German. Oxford: Basil Blackwell. doi:10.1080/19306962.1957.11786878. With a selection of texts.
- Palmer, Nigel F (1997). "The high and later Middle Ages (1100-1450)". In Watanabe-O'Kelly, H (ed.). The Cambridge History of German Literature. Cambridge: Cambridge University Press. pp. 40–91. doi:10.1017/CHOL9780521434171.003. ISBN 978-0521785730.
- Philipp, Gerhard (1980). Einführung ins Früneuhochdeutsche. Heidelberg: Quelle & Meyer. ISBN 3494020922. With a selection of texts.
- Reinhart, Max, ed. (2007). Early Modern German Literature 1350-1700. The Camden House History of German Literature. Vol. 4. New York, Woodbridge: Camden House. ISBN 978-1571132475.
- Watanabe-O'Kelly, Helen (1997). "The Early Modern Period (1450–1720)". In Watanabe-O'Kelly, H (ed.). The Cambridge History of German Literature. Cambridge: Cambridge University Press. pp. 40–91. doi:10.1017/CHOL9780521434171.003. ISBN 978-0521785730.
