= Das Siegesfest =

"The Victory Festival" ("Das Siegesfest") is a poem written in May 1803 by Friedrich Schiller, whose theme is the futility of military victories.
