= Paul C. Bishop =

British philosopher

Paul C. Bishop (born 1967) is a British scholar and William Jacks Chair in Modern Languages at the University of Glasgow.

== Books ==
- With R. H. Stephenson: Friedrich Nietzsche and Weimar Classicism. Camden House: Rochester, New York. 2004. ISBN 9781571136473
- The Archaic: the Past in the Present. Routledge: London. 2012. ISBN 9780415547550
- A Companion to Friedrich Nietzsche, Life and Works. Camden House: New York, NY, USA. 2012. ISBN 9781571133274
- Reading Goethe at Midlife : Ancient Wisdom, German Classicism, and Jung. Spring Journal Books: New Orleans, Louisiana. 2011. ISBN 9781935528104
- Analytical Psychology and German Classical Aesthetics: Goethe, Schiller and Jung, 2 vols. Routledge: London, UK. ISBN 9780415430296
- Bishop, Paul (2017). Ludwig Klages and the Philosophy of Life: A Vitalist Toolkit. Routledge. ISBN 9781138697157.
