= Society for the Encouragement of the Fine Arts =

The Society for the Encouragement of the Fine Arts was established in 1858, and was based in the architectural galleries and offices at 9 Conduit Street, Mayfair, London. Meetings were held at various galleries to increase technical knowledge.

The society's 9 Conduit Street location was the former town residence of the Earl of Macclesfield, and was shared by the society with several other organisations, including the Architectural Association, the Architectural Publication Society, the Architectural Union Company, the District Surveyors' Association, the Royal Photographic Society, the Provident Institution of Builders' Foremen and Clerks of Works, the Royal Institute of British Architects, the Society of Biblical Archaeology, the Society for the Encouragement of the Fine Arts, and access to the Museum of Building Appliances.

Those who were officers of the society included: the Earl of Carlisle (President 1858–1859); the Earl of Ellesmere (President from 1859); Viscount Stratford de Redcliffe (President in 1871); the Duke of Manchester (President in 1873); George Charles Haité (vice-president since 1881); and the Lord Mayor of London (vice-president in 1882).

Election to the membership was by means of a council ballot, with women being eligible.

== See also ==
- Sketch (restaurant)
