= Augustenburger Briefe =

The Augustenburger Briefen (Augustenburg Letters) are a collection of letters on aesthetics written by Friedrich Schiller in 1793 to Friedrich Christian von Augustenburg. They represent an early draft of Über die ästhetische Erziehung des Menschen in einer Reihe von Briefen ("Letters on the aesthetic education of man") but were believed lost in a fire. They were only published, on the basis of surviving copies, in 1875.
