= Das Märchen von der schönen Lilie =

Opera by Giselher Klebe

- Opera by Giselher Klebe
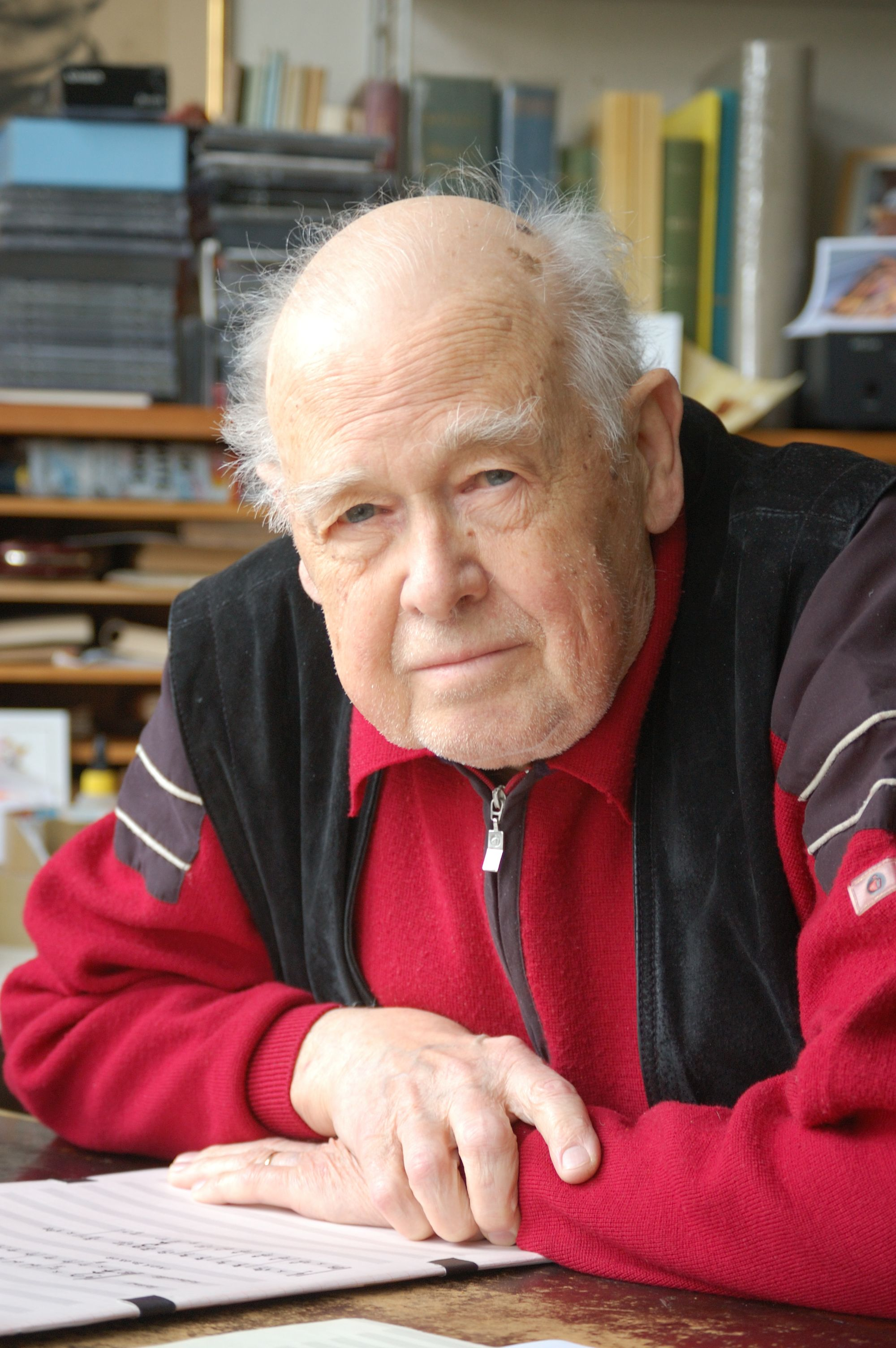
- The composer in 2008
- Translation: The Fairy Tale of the Beautiful Lily
- Librettist: Lore Klebe
- Language: German
- Based on: The Green Snake and the Beautiful Lily by Johann Wolfgang von Goethe
- Premiere: 15 May 1969; Schwetzingen Festival

Das Märchen von der schönen Lilie (The Fairy Tale of the Beautiful Lily), Op. 55, is an opera in two acts by Giselher Klebe, with a libretto by Lore Klebe, based on Goethe's fairy tale Das Märchen. On a commission by the SWR for the Schwetzingen Festival, it was premiered on 15 May 1969 at the Schlosstheater Schwetzingen, staged by Oscar Fritz Schuh and conducted by Hans Zender. The opera was published by Bärenreiter.

== History ==
Klebe composed the opera on a commission of the broadcaster Südwestrundfunk for the opening of the Schwetzingen Festival. He based the opera on classical literature, as also in some of his earlier operas such as Die Räuber after Schiller (1957), Die tödlichen Wünsche after Balzac (1959) and Alkmene after Kleist (1961). His wife, Lore Klebe, wrote the libretto based on the fairy tale Das Märchen, part of the novella Unterhaltungen deutscher Ausgewanderten by Johann Wolfgang von Goethe.

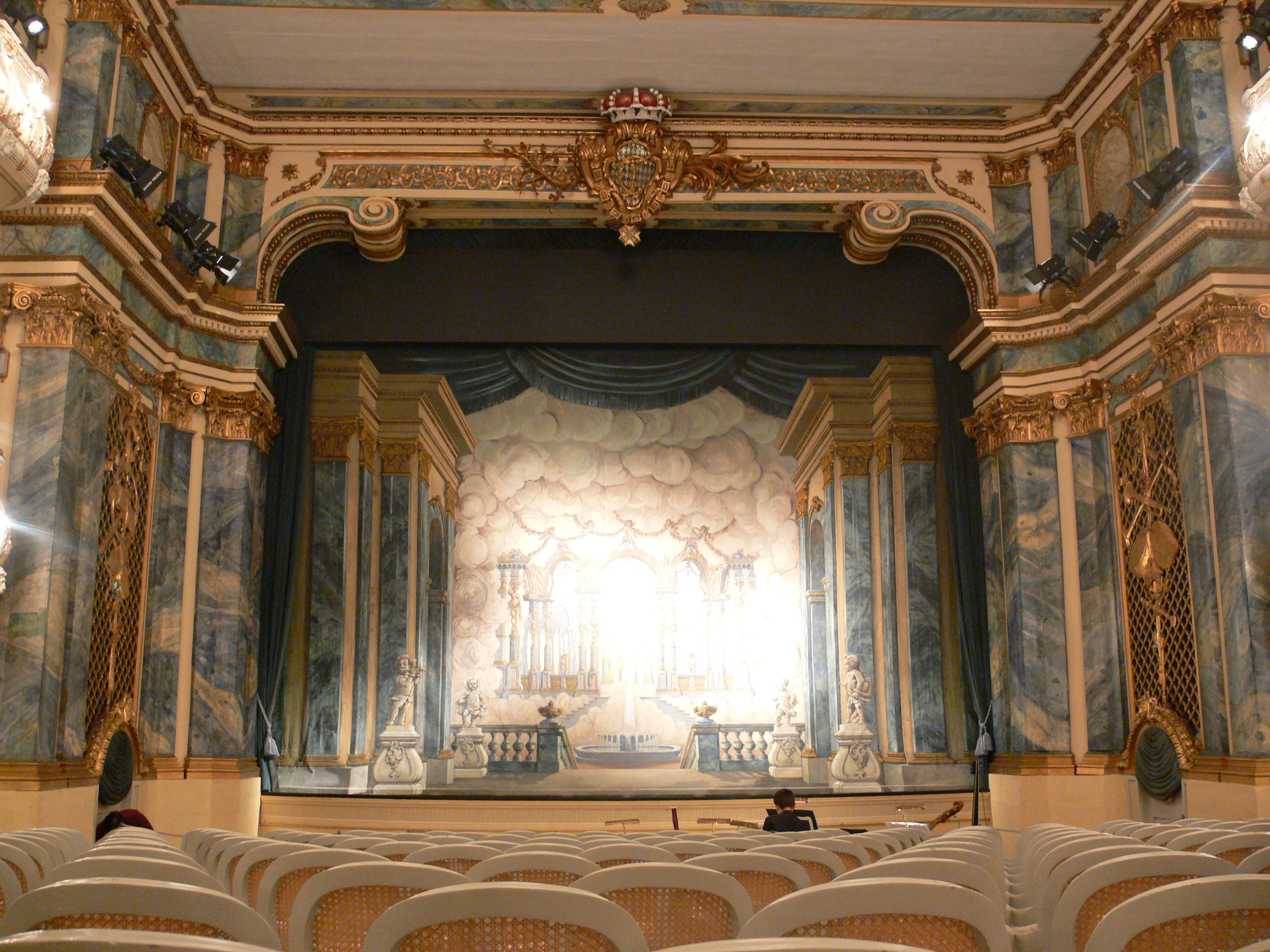
Stage of the Schlosstheater Schwetzingen

Das Märchen von der schönen Lilie premiered on 15 May 1969 at the Schlosstheater Schwetzingen. The night before, Marianne Hoppe recited Goethe's Märchen. The opera production of the Deutsche Oper am Rhein was directed by Oscar Fritz Schuh on a stage designed by Heinrich Wendel, and conducted by Hans Zender. The opera was published by Bärenreiter. The first performance in the German Democratic Republic was staged in Weimar in 1988, where Goethe had written his text.

== Theme ==
Goethe titled his art fairy tale like the genre, Märchen, indicating that it was a typical example of the genre in symbolic purity (in symbolischer Reinheit). He characterised it as at the same time significant and without specific meaning ("zugleich bedeutend and deutungslos"). Hugo von Hofmannsthal described it as an uninterpretable inner music of beautiful images and life contexts ("eine undeutbare innere Musik aus schönen Bildern und Lebensbezügen"), in other words: an abstract art.

== Roles ==
Role	Voice type	Premiere cast, 15 May 1969 Conductor: Hans Zender
Schlange	soprano	Rachel Yakar
Frau	soprano	Judith Beckmann
1st Girl	soprano	Rachel Mathes
2nd Girl	soprano	Brigitte Dürrler
Schöne Lilie	mezzo-soprano	Rose Marie Freni
3rd Girl	contralto	
The Youth	tenor	
Man with the Lamp	baritone	Kurt Gester
Ferry Man	baritone	Leif Roar
Giant	bass	Helmut Fehn
Golden King	bass	Eike Wilm Schulte
Silver King	bass	Peter-Christoph Runge
Iron King	bass	
Mixed King	bass	

== Music ==
Klebe's music is scored for soloists and a chamber orchestra of 30 players, including alto saxophone, harp and two pianos. Instruments in the low register dominate: there are a basset clarinet and three bassoons but no violins. Klebe used leitmotifs, chord motifs, twelve-tone tone rows and chromaticism. The music has been described as boldly turning backwards in music history and full of esoteric, beautiful sound.
