= Carl Künzel =

German autograph-collector (1808–1877)

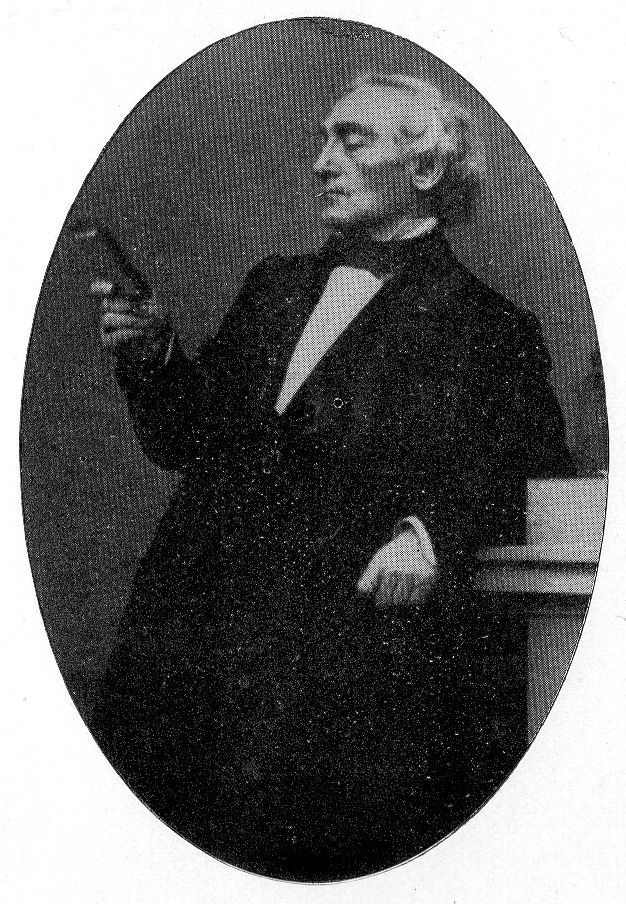
Carl Künzel

Carl or Karl Künzel (24 April 1808 – 3 February 1877) was a German autograph-collector.

== Life ==
The eldest son of city-councillor Bernhard Künzel and his wife Marie Magdalene, Carl Künzel was born in Heilbronn, where his father owned a house at 305 Metzgergasse. After leaving school, Carl's father let him sign up for an apprenticeship at the paper factory just founded in the town by the Rauch brothers and was taken on there afterwards, mainly sent out to visit customers and eventually spending 55 years there in total. Even as a young man he realised there were major gaps in his education and began filling many of them on a self-taught basis, getting up at 4 am to do so. He used work trips and contacts to customers to start building his autograph collection. From the 1860s he was mainly based in Heilbronn but holidayed in France and Italy.

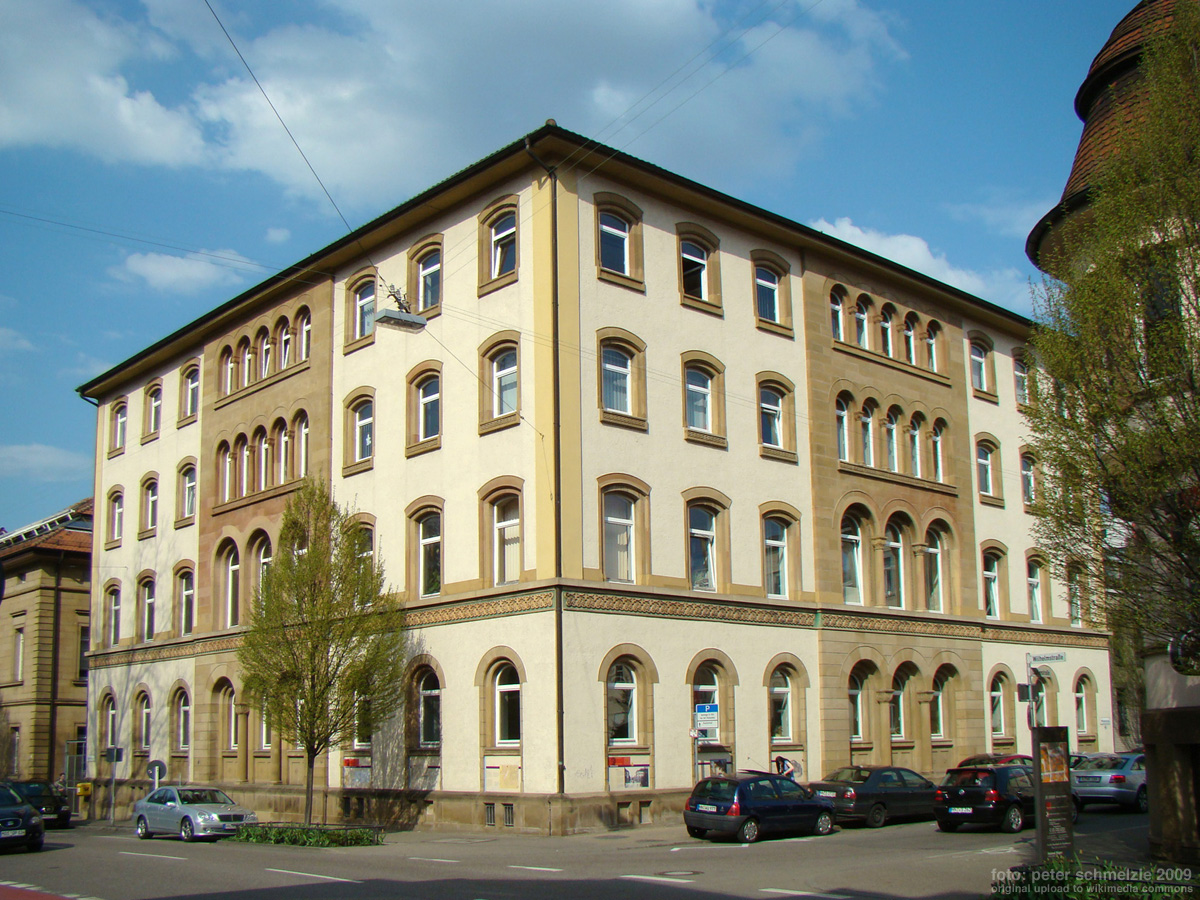
Wilhelmstraße 9, Heilbronn

From the 1840s he lived at 963 Vor dem Sülmertor in Heilbronn and then from 1850 in a building at 9 Wilhelmstraße in the same town, at the corner of Cäcilienstraße and Wilhelmstraße. The latter house had large rooms for social events and he furnished the building with antique furniture, including two early 17th century cupboards that had been dismantled to save them from the Thirty Years War, one of whose clay-clad doors had been used as the gate to a pigsty in Arles before Künzel rediscovered it.

Künzel belonged to the town's Gräßle-Gesellschaft or Herbulanum, which had emerged from Philipp Sicherer's circle of friends. In the 1840s the baker and landlord Christoph David Gräßle ran a wine-tavern or 'Weinwirtschaft' on Fleiner Straße opposite the choir of St. Kilian's Church. There the Gräßle-Gesellschaft was founded on 1 May 1845, with members including David Friedrich Strauß, Adolf Goppelt, Gustav Rümelin, Heinrich Titot, Adolf and Alfred Schliz, Eduard Zeller, Kuno Fischer, Christian Märklin, Friedrich Theodor von Vischer, Karl Reinhold Köstlin and Justinus Kerner. In the 1890s Gräßle's house was demolished and the body moved to the 'Traube' guesthouse at 3 Wilhelmstraße, although it had already begun using the Harmonie (later known as the Alte Harmonie) and the Liederkranzhaus in the 1880s.

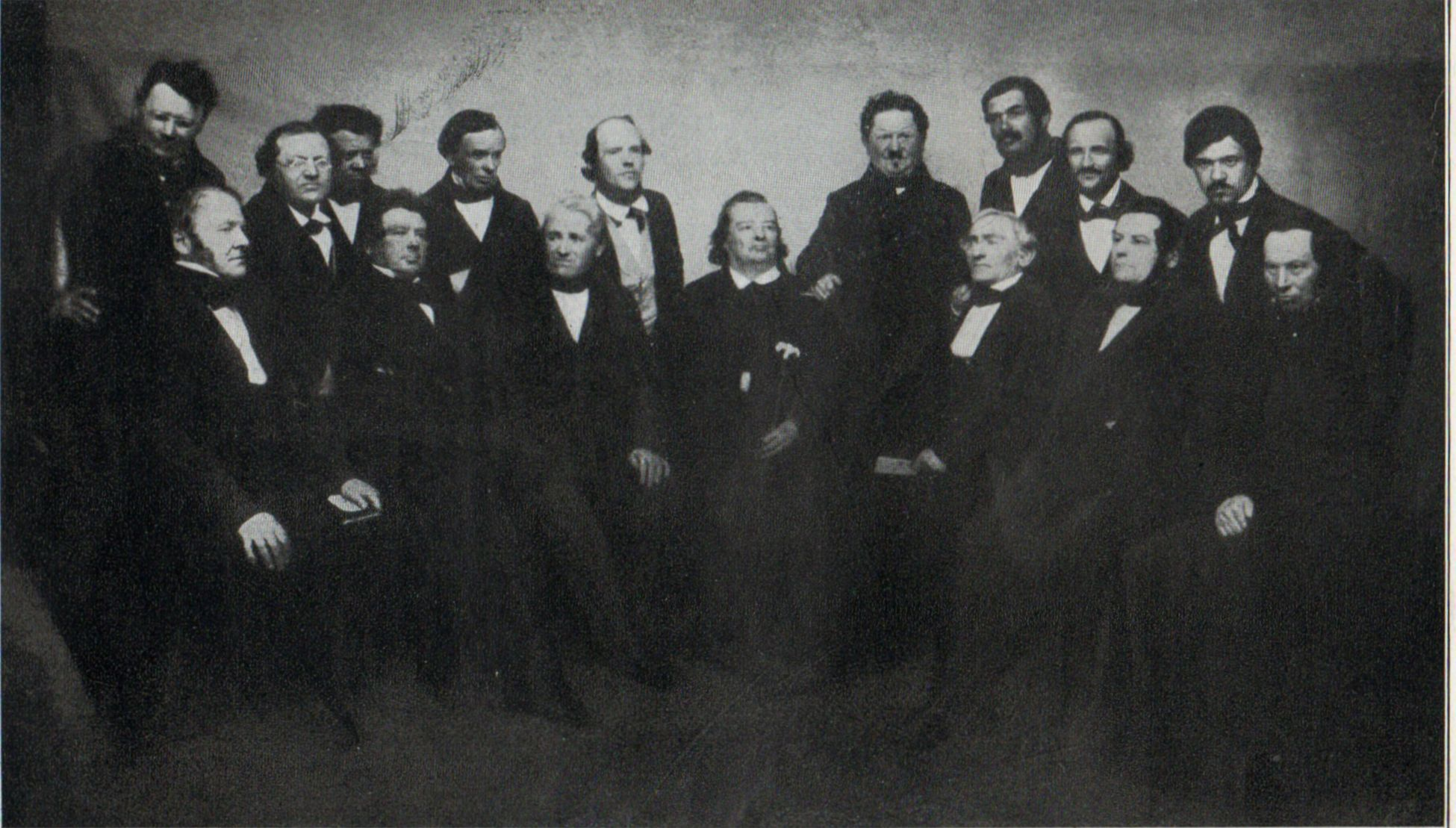
Carl Künzel (third seated figure from the right) with other members of the Gräßle-Gesellschaft

In this circle Künzel was teased with nicknames such as "the all-administrator" ("der Allverwaltende") and was particularly used as a travel-manager. He died of oedema in Heilbronn in 1877.

== Sammlung ==
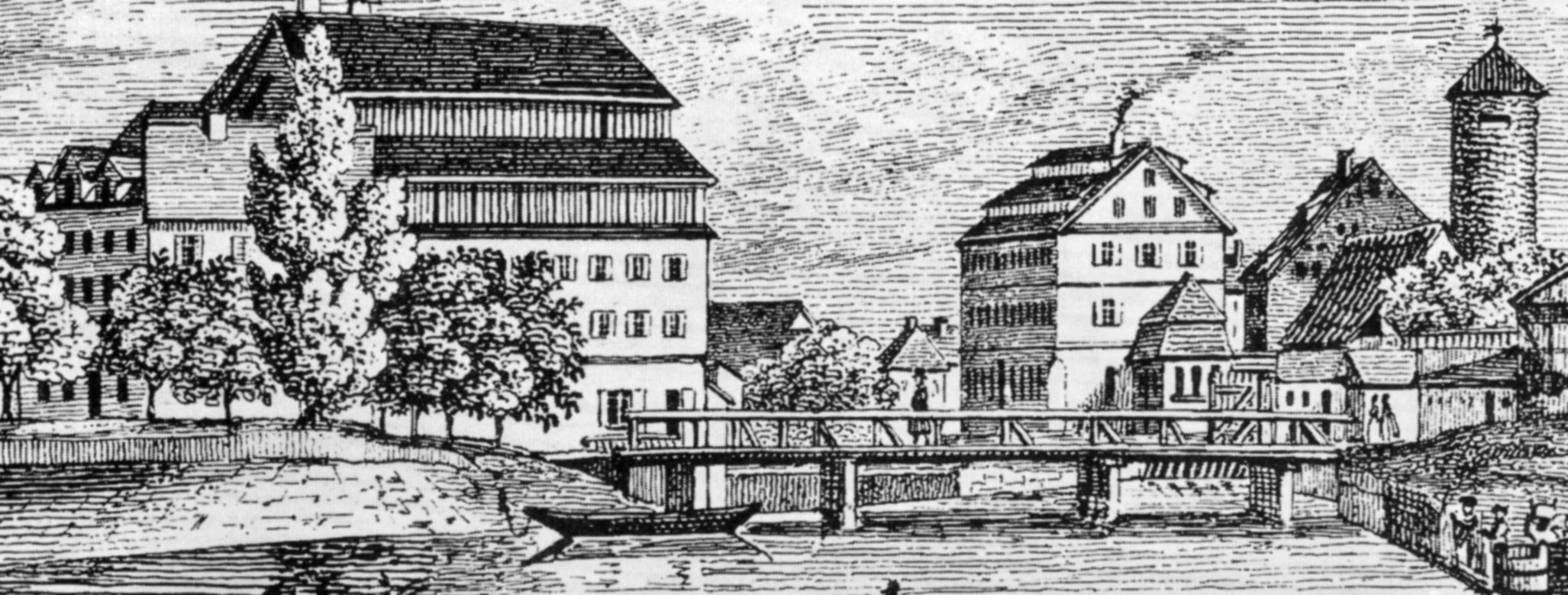
The Rauchsche Papierfabrik (left)

== Schiller's comic works ==
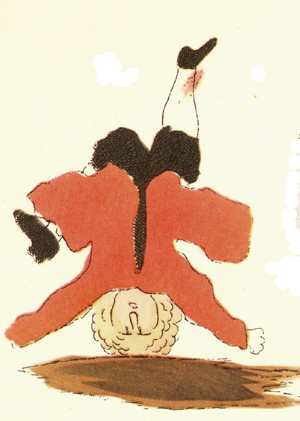
Self-caricature in Schiller's Avanturen

== Bibliography ==
- (in German) Emil Michelmann, Carl Künzel. Ein Sammler-Genie aus dem Schwabenland, Stuttgart 1938
- (in German) Carl Künzels „Schilleriana“. Briefe an Schiller und Schillers Familienmitglieder nach den Abschriften im Besitz des Wiener Goethe-Vereins (= Österreichische Akademie der Wissenschaften. Philosophisch-Historische Klasse. Sitzungsberichte, 229. Band, 3. Abhandlung)
