= Die Horen (Schiller) =

German monthly literary journal (1795–1797)

Die Horen (The Horae) was a monthly German literary journal published from 1795 to 1797. It was printed by the Cotta publishing house in Tübingen and edited and run by Friedrich Schiller. Many and partially antagonistic prominent figures in German culture of the time contributed, among them Johann Jakob Engel, Fichte, Goethe, Herder, Alexander von Humboldt, Wilhelm von Humboldt, Friedrich Heinrich Jacobi, Johann Heinrich Meyer, August Wilhelm Schlegel, and Karl Ludwig von Woltmann. The journal formed the cornerstone of Weimar Classicism and exerted a great influence onto German intellectual history.
