= Die Huldigung der Künste =

Die Huldigung der Künste (The Homage of the Arts) is a dramatic poem written by Friedrich Schiller. It was his last completed dramatic work and premiered on 12 November 1804 in Weimar. Its final sentence, expressing Schiller's artistic credo, is Denn aus der Kräfte schön vereintem Streben / Erhebt sich, wirkend, erst das wahre Leben.

At the time of its composition, Charles Frederick, Grand Duke of Saxe-Weimar-Eisenach had just married Maria Pavlovna, sister of tsar Alexander I of Russia. Then working with Johann Wolfgang von Goethe at the Weimar court, Schiller was commissioned to write a short piece in honour of the couple and the occasion. Under great pressure of time, he thus wrote Die Huldigung der Künste in four days for this purpose.

== Plot ==
A farming family wants to hold a great festival in honour of their new queen in order to give her a fitting welcome. A tree is planted as a symbol of the country. Then the seven arts (architecture, sculpture, painting, poetry, music, dance and drama) greet the new sovereign

== Sources ==
- (in German) Text of Die Huldigung der Künste on Project Gutenberg
- (in German) Wissen im Netz - Die Huldigung der Künste
