= Christian Gottfried Körner =

German writer (1756–1831)

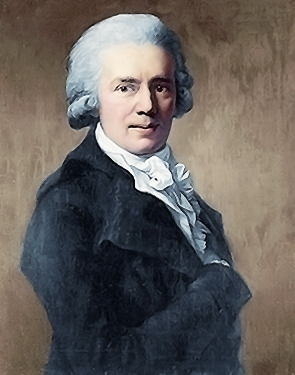
Christian Gottfried Körner

Christian Gottfried Körner (2 July 1756 – 13 May 1831) was a German jurist. His home was a literary and musical salon, and he was a friend of Friedrich Schiller.

== Biography ==
Born in Leipzig, he studied law at the University of Göttingen and at the Leipzig University. He got his degrees at Leipzig. In 1783 he became chief councillor of the Lutheran Upper Consistory at Dresden; he was appointed to the office of judge in the Court of Appeals in 1790; and, in 1811, he returned to the appellate court.

His home in Dresden was an important center for culture and the arts. Riggs (1997) writes:

The Körner household in Dresden ... became a literary and musical salon. Plays and essays were read; Singspiele and chamber music were performed; and lectures on art were given. Guests and participants included Johann Gottfried von Herder, Goethe, Wilhelm von Humboldt, the Schlegel brothers [August and Friedrich], Ludwig Tieck, Novalis, and the musicians Johann Naumann, Johann Hiller, Karl Zelter, Mozart, and Weber.

Körner went so far as to have a small theatre built in his home, at which his family and friends performed plays. A number of the plays of Friedrich Schiller, his close friend, received their private premieres in this theater, whilst his only comedy Körner's Morning was written for Körner's birthday. He corresponded with Goethe. Schiller lived with him much of the time between 1785 and 1787.

Following the Battle of Leipzig in 1813, during the Russian and Prussian occupation of Saxony, he was a Russian government councillor. In 1815, with the anticipated return of King Frederick Augustus, he decided to leave Dresden, angry that the conservative king would likely undo reforms begun by the occupiers. Having declared "I am more German than Saxon" in a letter to a friend, he and his family moved to Berlin, where Prussian policies more aligned with his beliefs. He found a position in the Prussian service, where he was state councillor and later Privy Councillor in the new Ministry of Education.

== Works ==
Among his works are the anonymous Aesthetische Ansichten (Leipzig, 1808), Versuche über Gegenstände der innern Stadtsverwaltung (Dresden, 1812), and Deutschlands Hoffnungen (Leipzig, 1813). Of greater importance is Schillers Briefwechsel mit Körner ("Schiller's correspondence with Körner", edited by Karl Goedeke, Leipzig, 1874; by Ludwig Geiger, Stuttgart, 1895–96). He also prepared the first collected edition of Schiller's works (1812–15). He edited the works of his deceased son (Poetischer Nachlass Theodor Körners, 1815). His own collected works are edited by Adolf Stern (Leipzig, 1881).

== Family ==
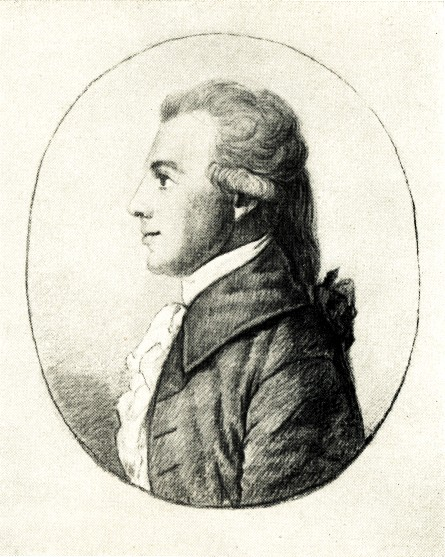
Körner portrayed by his sister-in-law Dora Stock

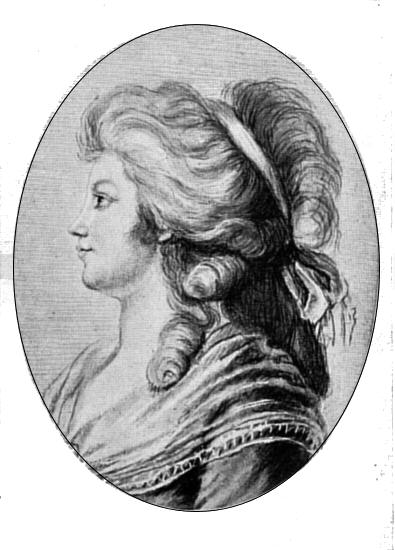
Minna Körner

Körner married Minna Stock, the daughter of Johann Michael Stock, an engraver, in 1785, following the death of his father, who had been implacably opposed to the marriage on grounds of social class. They lived, throughout their entire marriage, with the artist Dora Stock, Minna's older sister, with whom they were both close.

The Körners had two children who survived past infancy. (Note: Johann Edward, the first-born (24 July 1786) died at seven months.) Both had short but high-achieving lives: Emma Körner (1788–1815), who became a skilled painter, and Theodor Körner (1791–1813), who became a renowned soldier-poet. Both died young: Theodor in 1813 as a casualty of war, and Emma of a sudden illness in 1815; the parents were devastated at their loss.

Christian Gottfried Körner died in Berlin in 1831, aged 74.
