= Wendelin Weißheimer =

German composer (1838–1910)

Wendelin Weissheimer
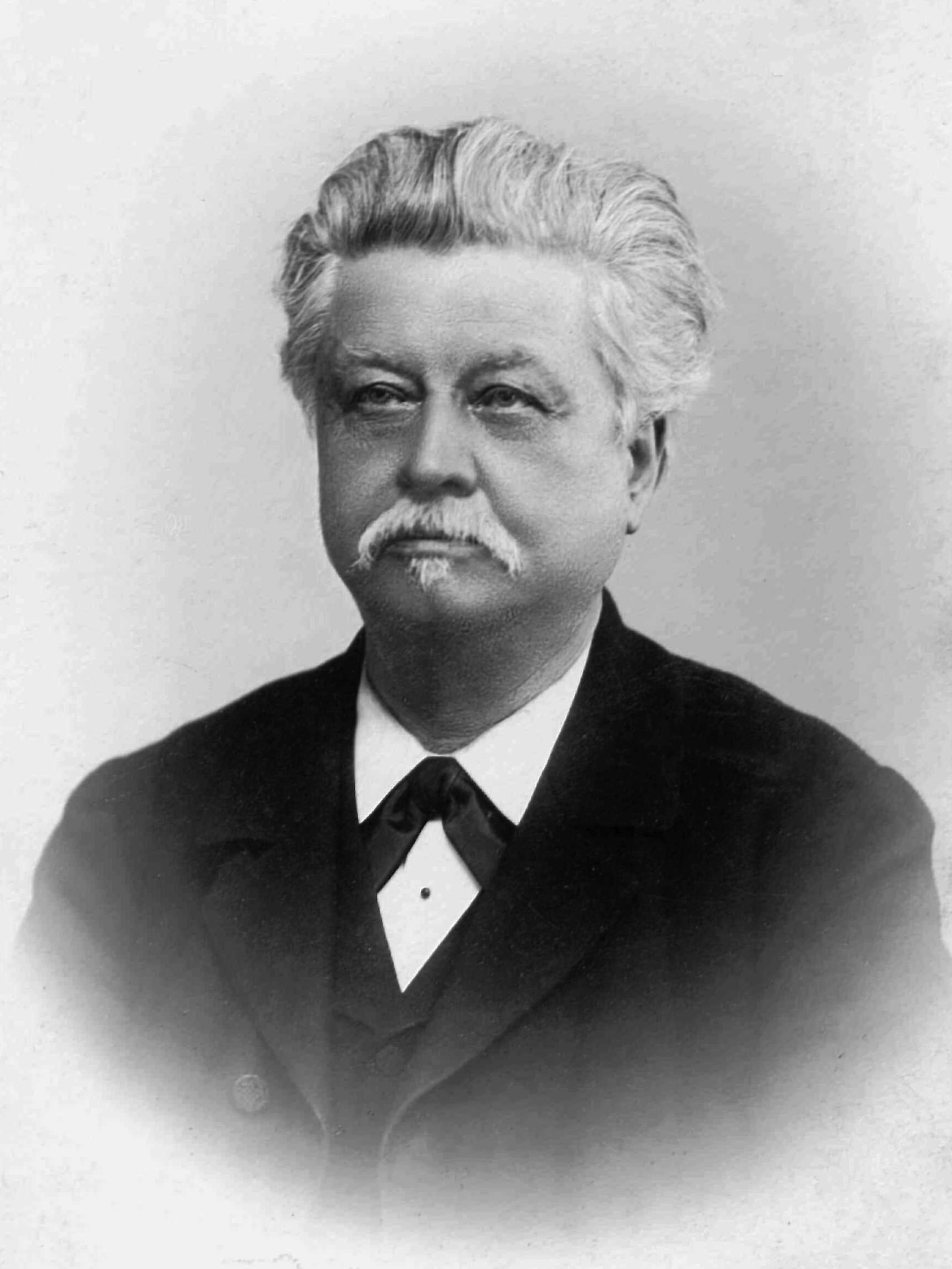
- Weißheimer, from the private archive of the Weingut Steinmuehle
- Born: 26 February 1838; Osthofen
- Died: 16 June 1910 (aged 72)
- Occupations: Conductor; essayist; music teacher; music writer
- Notable work: List of compositions
- Style: Romantic

Wendelin Weißheimer (26 February 1838 – 16 June 1910) was a German composer, conductor, essayist, teacher, and writer on music. He studied with Franz Liszt and was in close contact with Richard Wagner, Hans von Bülow, Peter Cornelius, Louise Otto-Peters, Ferdinand Lassalle, August Bebel and many other notable musicians of his time.

He served as composer and conductor of choirs in Mainz, Darmstadt, Baden-Baden, Würzburg, Munich, Leipzig, Berlin, Düsseldorf, Szczecin, Strasbourg and at Milan's La Scala.

== Early life ==
=== Origin, family and childhood ===
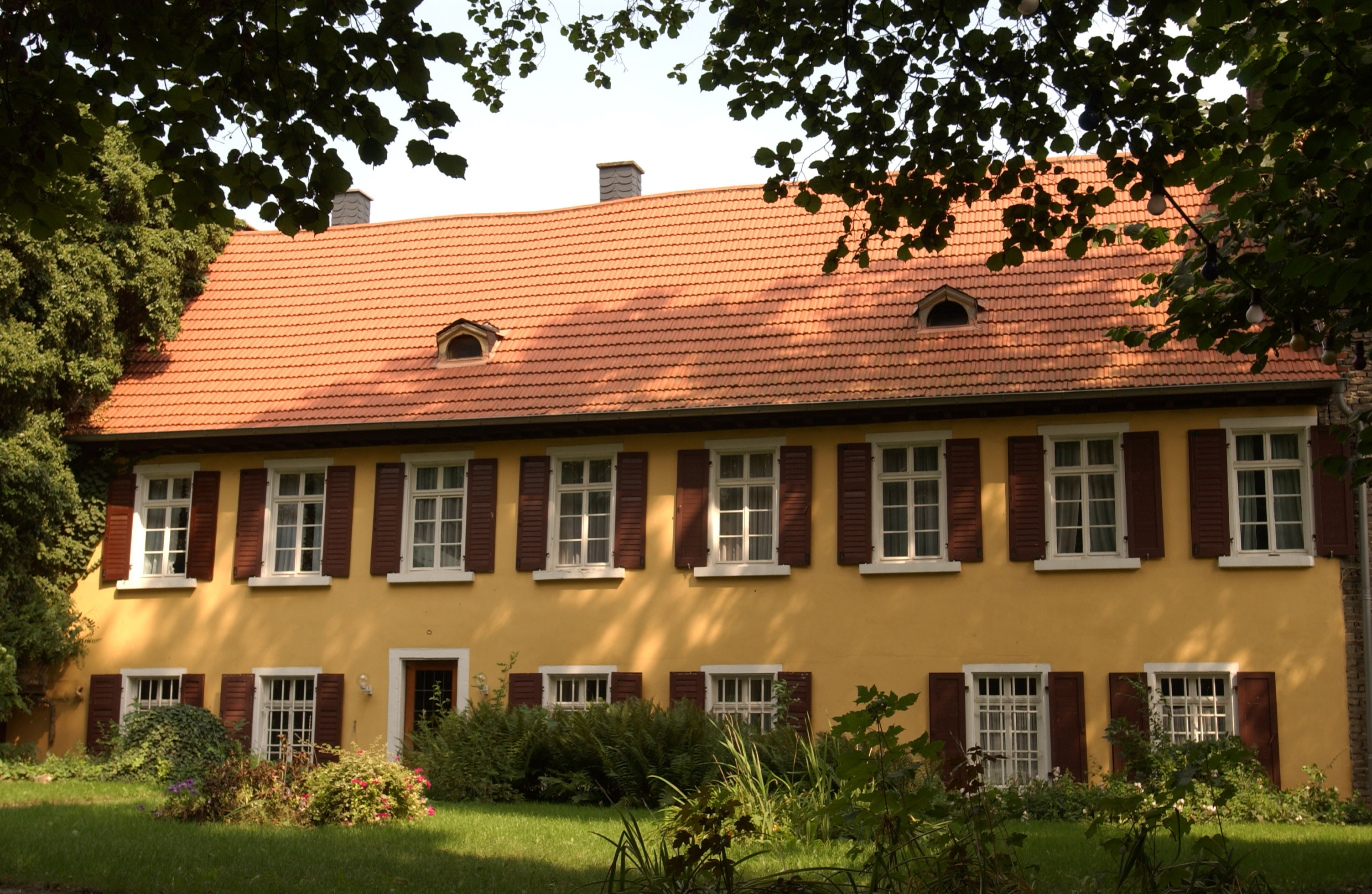
The Stone Mill Winery, where Wendelin Weißheimer was born in 1838

The Weißheimer family resided in Westhofen in the 14th century. Wendelin's grandfather, Johann Weißheimer I, from Osthofen, inherited a stone mill from his mother's family at the end of the 18th century. Viticulture, agriculture, animal husbandry and mill grinding were already undertaken on the manor complex in the 19th century. The manor is still owned by the Weißheimer family. This complex was one of the most important in the former Grand Duchy of Hesse.

Wendelin Weißheimer was born at the Stone Mill Winery of Osthofen, the eighth and youngest child of Johann Weißheimer II and Ottilie, née Best der Welt. His parents were wealthy and his father, a highly respected and multi-talented man with a keen interest in history and politics, had already been mayor for several years and a member of the first Osthofen Hessian Ständekammer, which is why Wendelin met, at a young age, men of the March Revolution of 1848 at the Stone Mill. Despite his commitments as landowner and politician, Wendelin Weißheimer's father found time to deal with family and traditional, historical studies, the result of which was his multi-volume chronicle of the Osthofens recorded in handwritten diaries. He allowed Wendelin to study music, although this clearly contradicted his intentions of making Wendelin his estate's heir.

=== The path to music ===
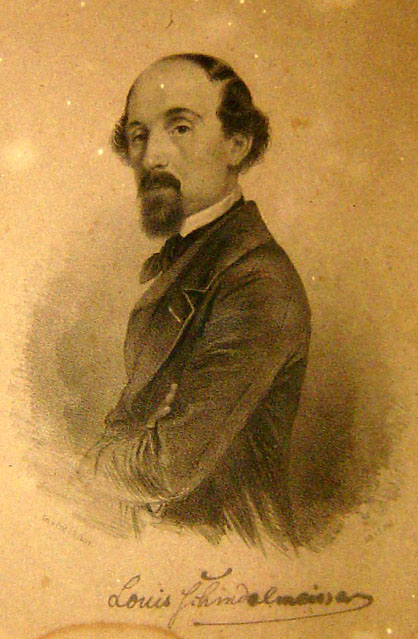
Louis Schindelmeisser

Weißheimer's background differed from other composers in that he did not come from a musical family. His father had intended him to inherit the Stone Mill, and thus he was sent to a secondary school in Darmstadt when he was only 13 as an apprentice. There, through his piano teacher, a member of the theater orchestra, he had an opportunity to listen to a rehearsal for the performance of Tannhauser. He had heard earlier parts of the music during a visit to a military concert. Weißheimer wrote that these experiences influenced him greatly. In his book: Experiences with Richard Wagner, Franz Liszt and many other contemporaries, he wrote: "An unsuspected new world had risen for me, in fact." Soon thereafter, in Darmstadt, Wendelin Weißheimer listened to the Lohengrin opera, and in Frankfurt to the Flying Dutchman, putting him into a Wagnerian delirium. In his final year in school Wendelin was introduced to music theory by theater conductor Louis Schindelmeisser. This so captivated him that he soon began to compose.

Schindelmeisser was the first to recognize Wendelin's musical talent. He had to persuade Wendellin's father to allow him to pursue his musical intentions. To this end, Schindelmeisser went to the Stone Mill in Osthofen on 16 March 1856. The father's initial astonishment gave way to his approval. On his departure, Schindelmeisser gave young Weißheimer a picture dedicated to him as well as one of many original letters written by Richard Wagner.

=== Music studies ===
Wendelin Weißheimer attended the Leipzig Conservatory from May 1856. Both Leipzig and Weimar had a lively musical scene. While Leipzig was conservative and spurned the new music of Liszt and Wagner, the revolutionary youth in Weimar sought new forms of musical expression and embraced the so-called New German School and its genius, Franz Liszt. After completing his studies Wendelin took the post of second conductor at the city theatre in Mainz under Schindelmeisser. Before beginning, he traveled to Zurich to visit Richard Wagner, who was living there in exile. Wagner was working on his musical drama Tristan and Isolde and usually declined to see visitors. Wendelin was first rejected, but eventually spent one memorable afternoon with the master on 17 July 1858. Weißheimer writes of his encounter: "The pale expressive face of the then forty-five-year-old, accompanied me in town and everywhere else."

== Musical career ==
=== Conducting in Mainz ===
Just 20 years old, Weißheimer took up his post as conductor in Mainz on 17 August 1858 and, among other things, visited publisher Franz Schott and his musical wife Betty. After a performance of Wagner's Faust overture, Weißheimer got to know his Rhine-Hessian compatriot, the poet-composer Peter Cornelius, who became a lifelong friend.

=== With Franz Liszt in Weimar ===
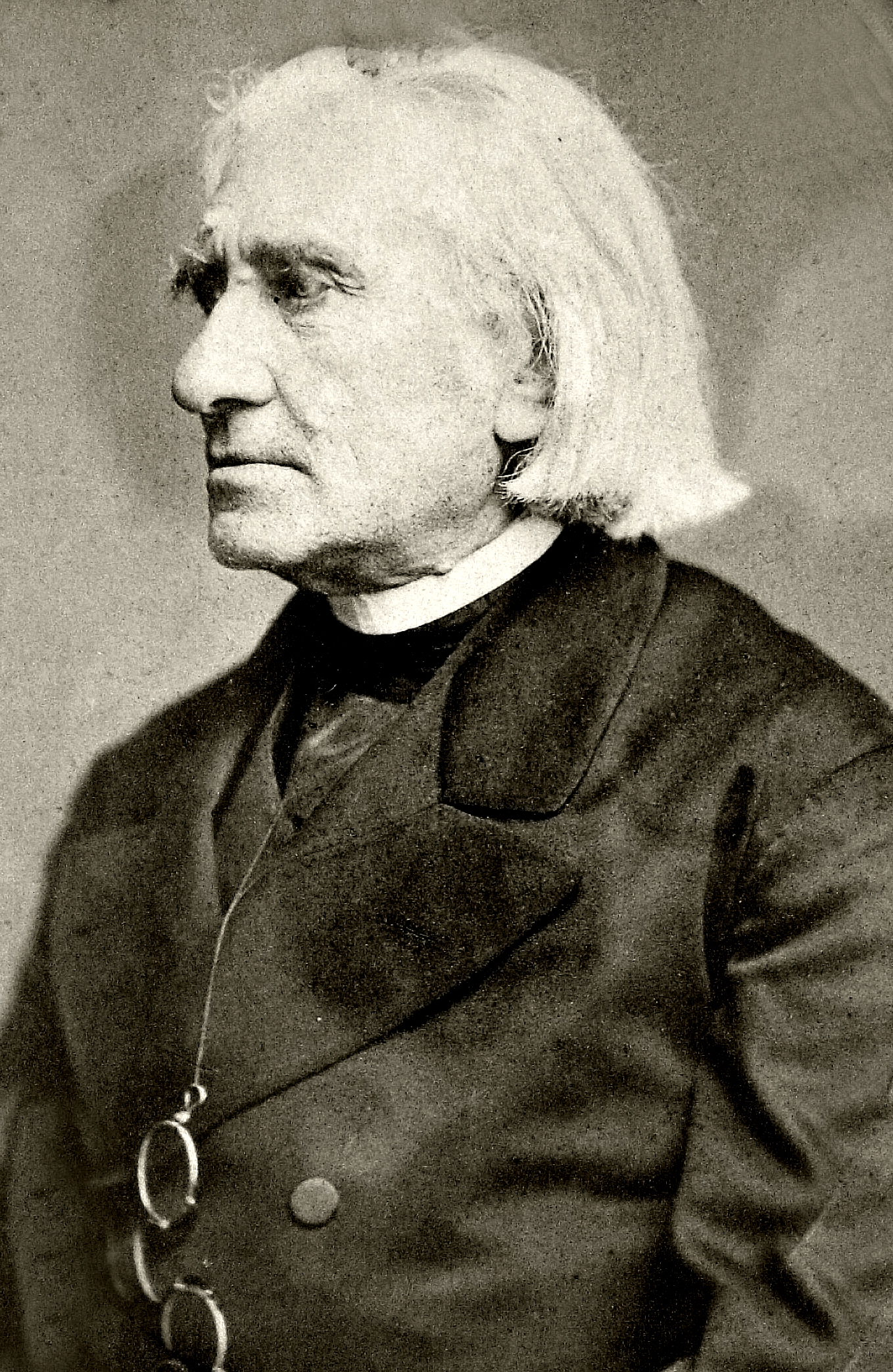
Weißheimer's mentor, Franz Liszt

Weißheimer moved back to Weimar after the theatre season. He and Liszt were musically like-minded and so Weißheimer was accepted by Liszt as a student in composition. Lessons were held three to four times a week, for several hours at a time. Weißheimer soon became Liszt's favorite student. Here, in Altenburg, Weimar, home of Liszt's close friend Princess Carolyne zu Sayn-Wittgenstein of Sayn-Wittgenstein, Weißheimer was introduced to a new musical world. While here he met his friend, Peter Cornelius, who had also come to Weimar in 1860, and was introduced to Felix Draeseke, Hans von Bronsart, Carl Tausig, the Bohemian Smetana, Franz Bendel, Gruère and Hans von Bülow among other notables.

In Weimar, one of Weißheimer's compositions was first performed by an orchestra. Liszt included Weißheimer's symphony on Schiller's Ritter Toggenburg on the program for the court concerts that he conducted on 13 March 1860. To allow Weißheimer to take part in this concert at the Grand Ducal Palace, which was only accessible to the court and nobility, Liszt had him wear a tail coat and a white tie and placed him in the middle of the string orchestra, where he had to pretend to play the violin. At the end of the concert, the Grand Duke and Grand Duchess expressed approval of the composer. The next day on his visit to Liszt, Weißheimer met daughter Cosima, who was married for two years to von Bülow and who would later become Wagner's second wife.

Weißheimer's stay in Weimar climaxed in 1861. He presented a musical meeting starting with Liszt's Faust Symphony under Bülow's baton. Weißheimer achieved complete success with the presentation of his Grave in Busento by the court orchestra and the academic choir of Jena students. Wagner made an unexpected appearance at this event, after eleven years of exile in Switzerland.

=== Friendship with Richard Wagner ===
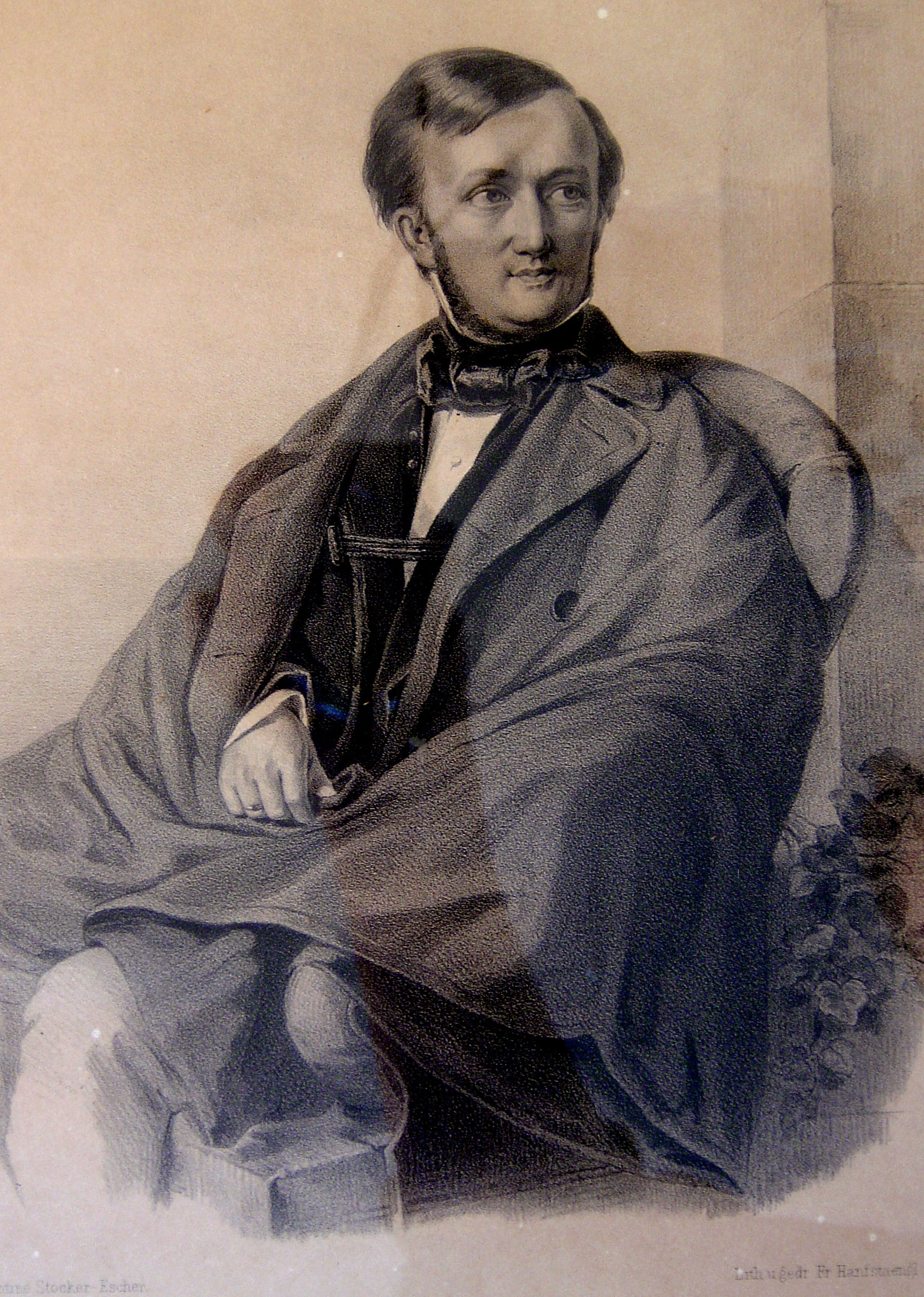
Richard Wagner

In the autumn of 1861 Weißheimer returned to the Mainz theatre as music director. During this period he befriended Wagner. After the Weimar meeting, Wagner tried unsuccessfully to reach Paris in late November where Prince Metternich had provided him with a garden apartment at the Austrian Embassy. On 1 December, he arrived unexpectedly in Mainz to negotiate his stage festival play Die Meistersinger von Nuernberg with the Schott publishing house. He already had the text and the poetic process was to take place in Paris. During the days in Mainz, Wagner attended the opera performances conducted by Weißheimer and Weißheimer also participated in his meetings with Mrs. Betty Schott.

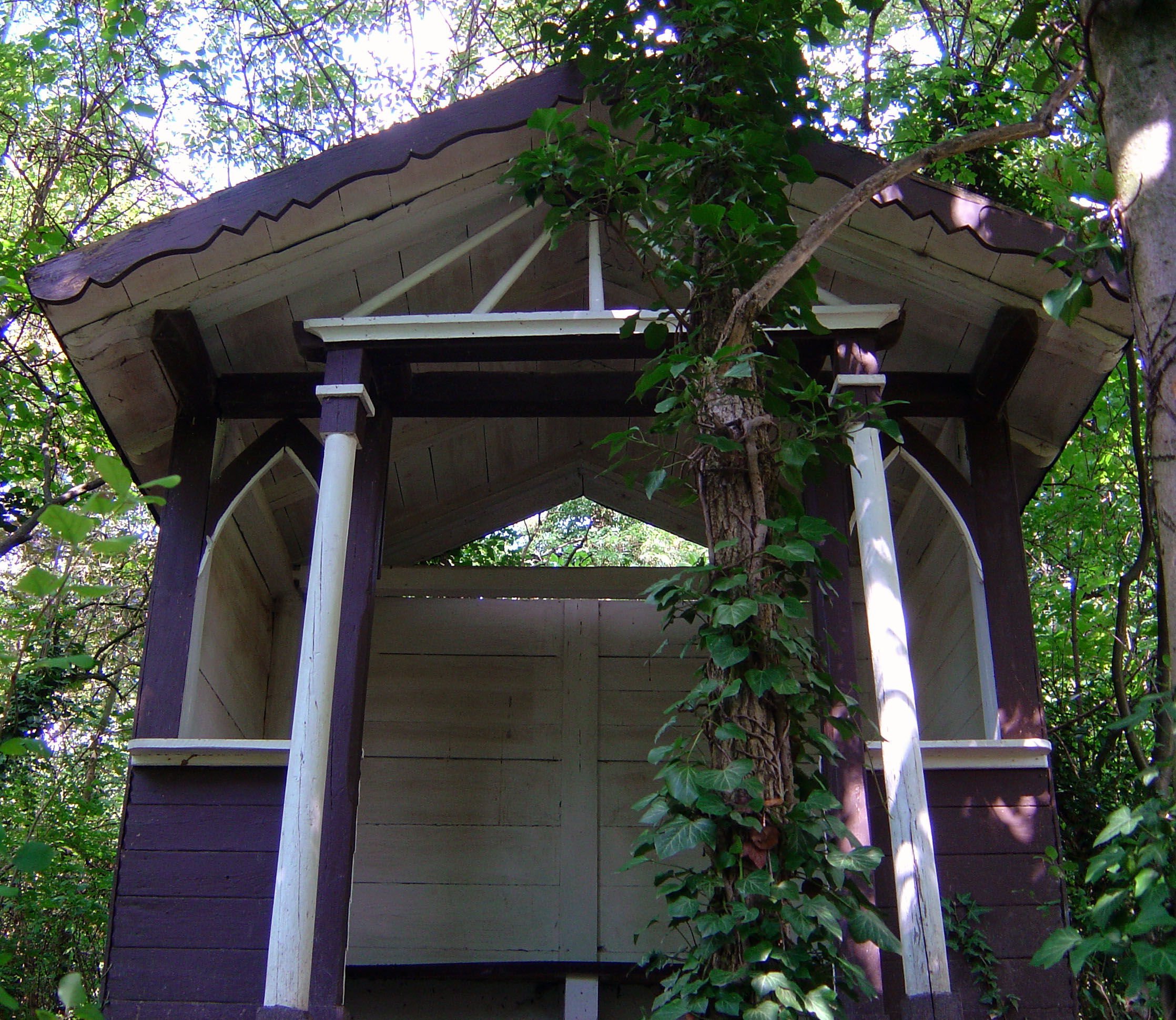
"Richard-Wagner-house" in the Garden of Stone Mill.

After successfully completing his Meistersinger poetry in less than two months in Paris, Wagner returned to Mainz on 31 January 1862. That same evening, in the Schotts' house, before a selected circle of listeners, Wagner presented the Meistersinger's poetry. Peter Cornelius and Weißheimer were present. Weißheimer writes about this memorable night that "Wagner carried away with the audience and caused them to rally tumultuously. At the end of the play the audience was aware that they stood at the cradle of a mighty work of art."

In order to be able to complete the composition without uninterruption, Wagner rented a small apartment in nearby Biebrich, just below the ducal castle on the Rhine. As a result, Weißheimer and Wagner were together almost every day. Weißheimer had become almost indispensable for Wagner, so, despite the 25-year difference in age, (Note: Richard Wagner at that time was 48 years old while Wendelin Weißheimer was just 23) a warm friendship developed. Wagner's recurrent financial difficulties prompted Weißheimer to visit his father in order to request financial help for his friend. Johann complied. This was Wagner's first visit to the Stone Mill. (Note: Where Wagner met Wendelin's parents, siblings, and last but not least, the "wine" on 1 June 1862) He met Wendelin's parents, siblings, and last but not least, the "wine" on 1 June 1862. When he had to stay in bed a few weeks due to illness, Wagner paid a surprise visit to the Stone Mill to leave Wendelin the only copy of The Valkyrie for Wendelin's appreciation. In the garden pavilion by the lake shore, known as "Richard-Wagner-house," Wagner spent many hours boozing and proved to be a brilliant entertainer. That August, Wagner returned to the Stone Mill, this time accompanied by Hans and Cosima von Bülow.

=== Richard Wagner's patron ===
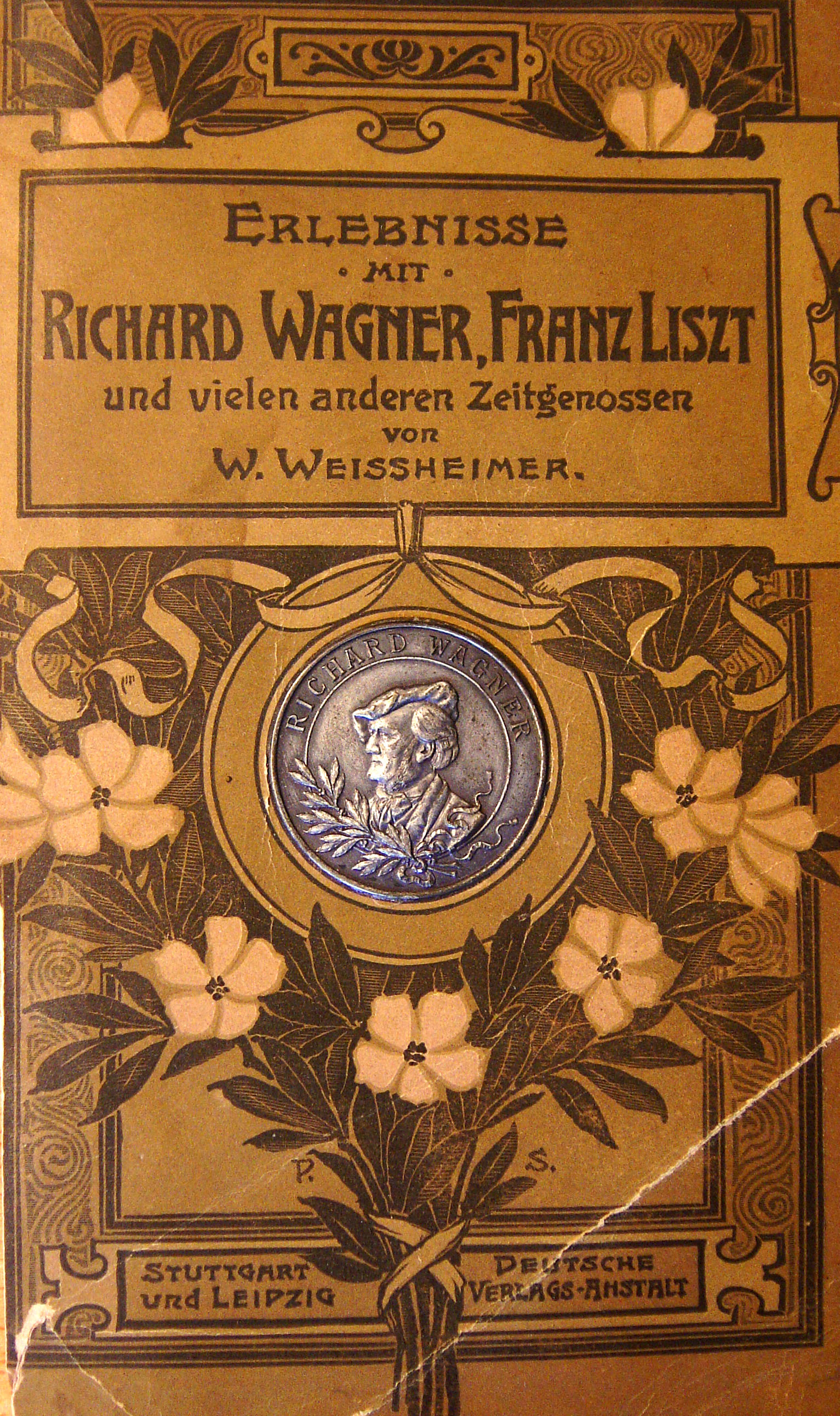
Experiences with Richard Wagner, Franz Liszt and many other contemporaries

Weißheimer knew of Wagner's financial problems. Die Meistersinger was not finished on schedule and Schott held back the payments. Wagner's admirers denied him further assistance. To relieve Wagner's financial difficulties Weißheimer organized a concert at the Leipzig Gewandhaus on 1 November 1862. Despite the personal involvement of Wagner, von Bülow and other renowned artists and organizations with works by Wagner, Liszt and Weißheimer, the attendance at the concert was so low that not enough revenue was collected to cover the costs. (Note: This concert was the first time that Richard Wagner was allowed to perform in Germany after his exile.) This concert was the first time that Wagner had been allowed to perform in Germany after his exile.

Weißheimer writes: "Instead of Wagner filling up his pockets, I quickly had to call my father for help," and again and again latter provided financial support. Wagner no longer held events in Biebrich but moved to Vienna in November 1862. There he again tried to premiere "Tristan," but without success. Although Wagner had a lot of money from a concert tour in Russia in 1863, he was again in financial straits. Finally, he had to flee from Vienna to avoid being put in debtors' prison.

On 29 April 1864, Wendelin Weißheimer received a telegram from Stuttgart from Wagner, asking him for an immediate visit. Weißheimer went and Wagner reported his financial and psychological breakdown. Weißheimer thus decided to stay with Wagner. Since Wagner was in debt he was urged to disappear. They agreed on a secluded spot in Rauhe Alb, where Weißheimer would accompany him. There Weißheimer intended to finish the piano score of the first Meistersingers act as quickly as possible in order to persuade the publisher, Schott, to make additional payments. Their journey had been set for 3 May, as Wagner wanted to see a performance of Don Giovanni conducted by Karl Eckert. However, on 2 May, at the hotel Marquard, the Secretary of King Ludwig II of Bavaria, Council of State Franz Seraph von Pfistermeister, appeared with a mission to explore the residence of Richard Wagner and return with him to Munich. When crown Prince Ludwig II listened to Wagner's Lohengrin he said: "When I am crowned, I want to show the world how much I know of the genius of Wagner." He was seeking a way to maintain his self-given promise. As Wagner's most ardent admirer, he wanted to give him the opportunity to finish his Der Ring des Nibelungen. So, instead of the rough journey to the Alps, Wagner went on 3 May 1864 to Munich, and after the reception by the King, returned to Vienna to pay his debts before he moved into the Villa on Lake Starnberg provided to him by the King.

=== Ferdinand Lassalle ===
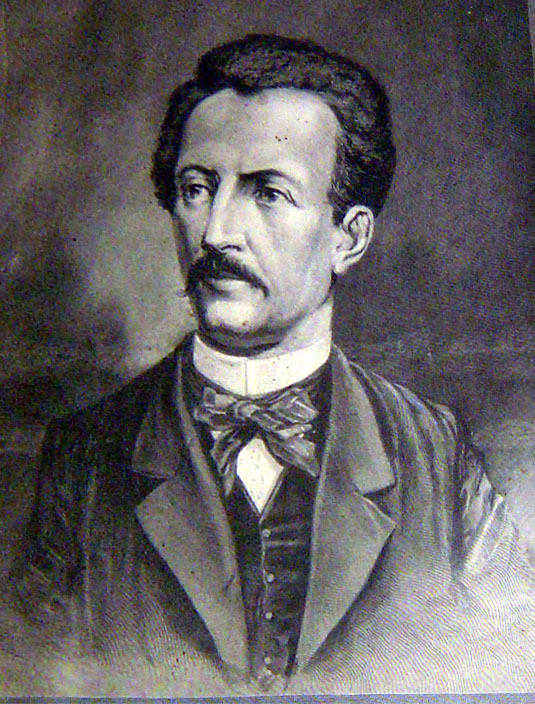
Ferdinand Lassalle

Wendelin Weißheimer's soon developed a friendship with Ferdinand Lassalle, the greatest demagogue of his time. After studying economics, history and philosophy, he dealt primarily with social issues and made it his life's work to create a "democratic party for social progress" which the monarchy respected as the uppermost representative of the people.

Weißheimer was attracted by Lassalle's writings. In July 1864 Weißheimer found out that Lassalle had arranged an excursion in the Palatinate with the countess Sophie von Hatzfeld. He invited both to Stone Mill. The news of Lassalle's arrival quickly spread in Osthofen. The villagers watched, with curiosity, as both guests walked from the railway station to the Stone Mill on 6 July. At the Stone Mill the reception was polite. Lassalle captivated the Weißheimer family for hours describing his plans and goals and he spoke with Johann Weißheimer on his studies about Franz von Sickingen. Lassalle made friends there and when they parted, he ordered a barrel of the "Riesling" which he had been served.

Wendelin Weißheimer spent several days in the Palatinate with Lassalle, the Countess von Hatzfeld and other friends. Wendelin was invited to accompany Lassalle on a trip to the east of Switzerland but, because of an urgent message received from his wife, who had fallen seriously ill in Leipzig, he had to decline the invitation. Lassalle traveled alone to Lake Lucerne in mid-July, while the Countess von Hatzfeld went to Wildbad for a cure. Lassalle met Helena von Dönniges, daughter of historian Wilhelm von Dönniges, known to him from Berlin. This occasion turned disastrous as Lassalle was challenged to a duel and was fatally shot. Lassalle's death was a severe blow that took Wendelin a long time to overcome, convinced that Lassalle's death could have been averted if he had stayed with him. Throughout his life Wendelin remained faithful to the Social Democratic Party, although this commitment brought disadvantages for his professional career.

=== Weißheimer as conductor and composer ===
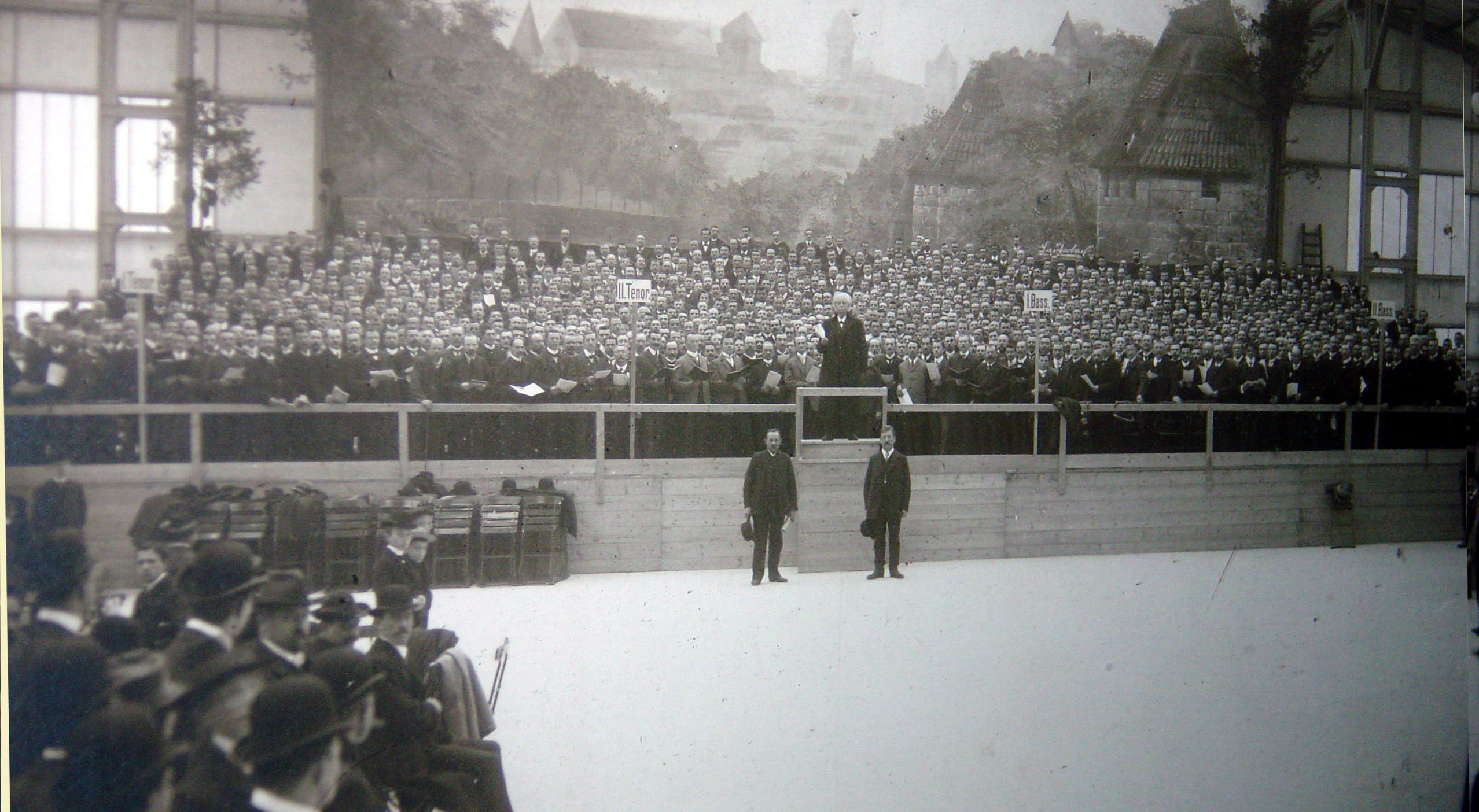
Weißheimer conducting a mass choir at the Luitpold Hall in Nuremberg, Bavaria

Wendelin Weißheimer became music director in Augsburg. Despite his official duties and numerous other engagements he continued to compose. After scoring songs and ballads of the German Minnesang, as well as from Goethe and other poets, he dealt with his first opera Theodor Körner. Franz Liszt and Wagner spoke appreciatively of this work. Lassalle, who had particularly liked the libretto and was equally enthusiastic about the music, had offered to write Weißheimer a libretto centered on an historical figure such as Florian Geyer, Thomas Munzer or the Bohemian Jan Žižka, but his death put an end to this idea. Wagner had written for Weißheimer a draft for the opera, Wieland the Blacksmith, but gave it back before scoring it.

For the premiere of Theodor Körner at the Berlin Court Opera, Liszt began with the former artistic director Count von Redern. However, Count von Redern recommended Liszt to run the premiere on a different stage because Prince Louis Ferdinand was to play a role which would affect the Prussian royal family too strongly. For the premiere to be accommodated elsewhere it would be important to gain Wagner's support, for whom Wendelin had fought for many years. But Wagner was too immersed in his own work to be of any help. Weißheimer's negotiations with Munich moved very slowly.

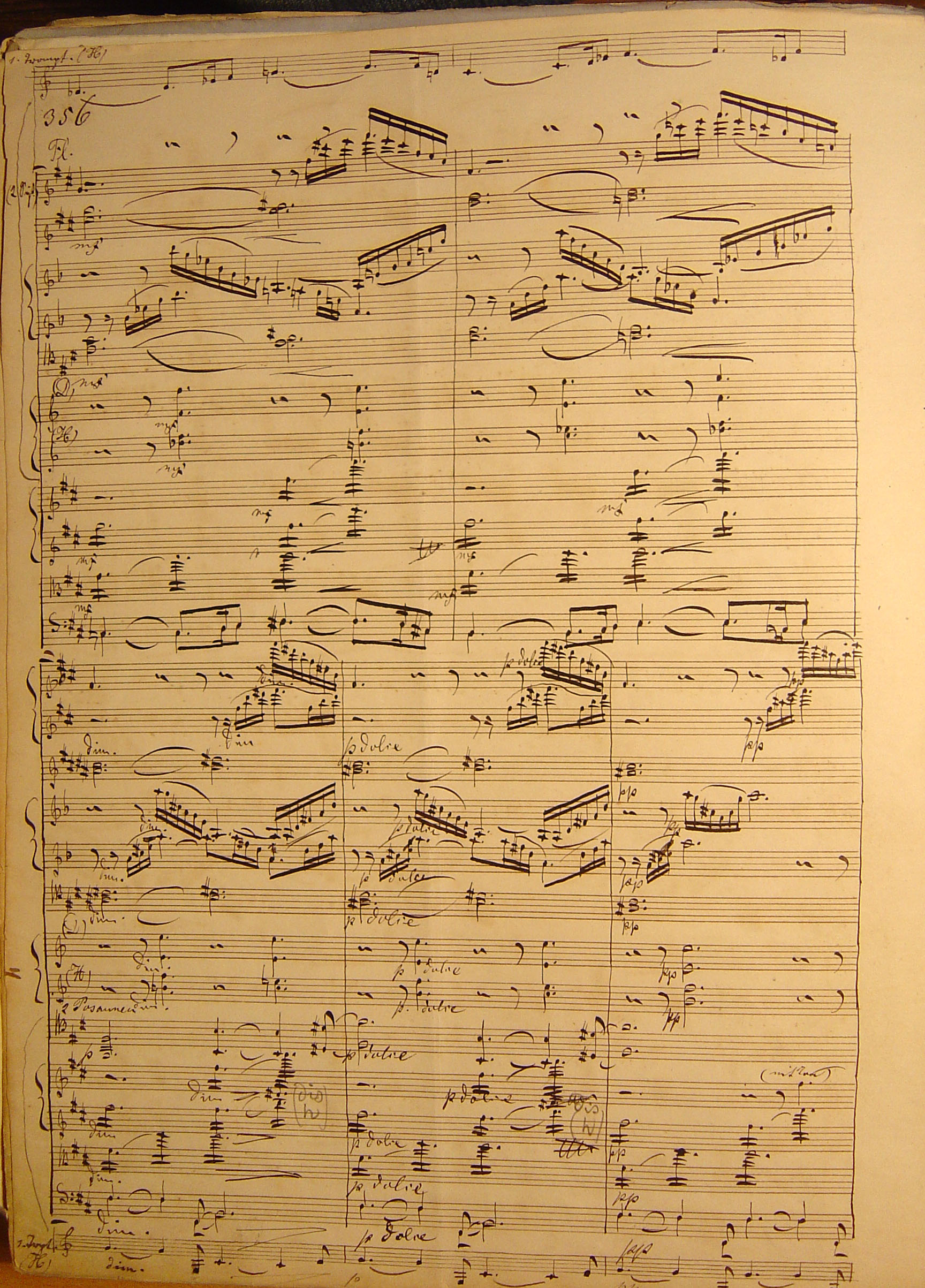
Original notes from Weißheimer's Theodor Körner

While a conductor at the Augsburg palace, Wendelin married Rosalie Scholle from Leipzig on 10 January 1865. They were married for 45 years but produced no children. Rosalie survived her husband, dying at the age of 79 on 25 September 1920 in Darmstadt. From Augsburg, Weißheimer went to the Kroll Opera in Berlin, then to the theater in Düsseldorf. From 1866 to 1868 he was in Würzburg. From here he tried once again a world premiere of his patriotic opera Theodor Körner. For this reason he looked up to Wagner in Munich. Wagner was living with Hans and Cosima von Bülow in a house on Arcisstraße, donated to him by the king and where Cosima was a housewife who took care of Wagner's correspondence. Wagner soon became interested in Mrs. Bülow. His relationship with Weißheimer began to wane, and Weißheimer drew closer to Peter Cornelius at the premiere of the latter's 1865 opera Der Cid.

The friendship between Weißheimer and Richard Wagner ended in June 1868. This was after Cosima, without reviewing the music, wrote on 6 July to Weißheimer that the text of his "Theodor Körner" could not be performed in court theaters because its seditious tendency might provoke trouble in peaceful times. Wendelin, like his father, was stubborn and didn't support her views. His disagreement with Cosima came between him and Wagner. The situation was compounded when Wendelin Weißheimer recognised their love affair. He sided with the betrayed von Bülow. At the premiere of Die Meistersinger in Munich on 21 June 1868, Weißheimer had his last encounter with Wagner.

=== Weißheimer's last years ===
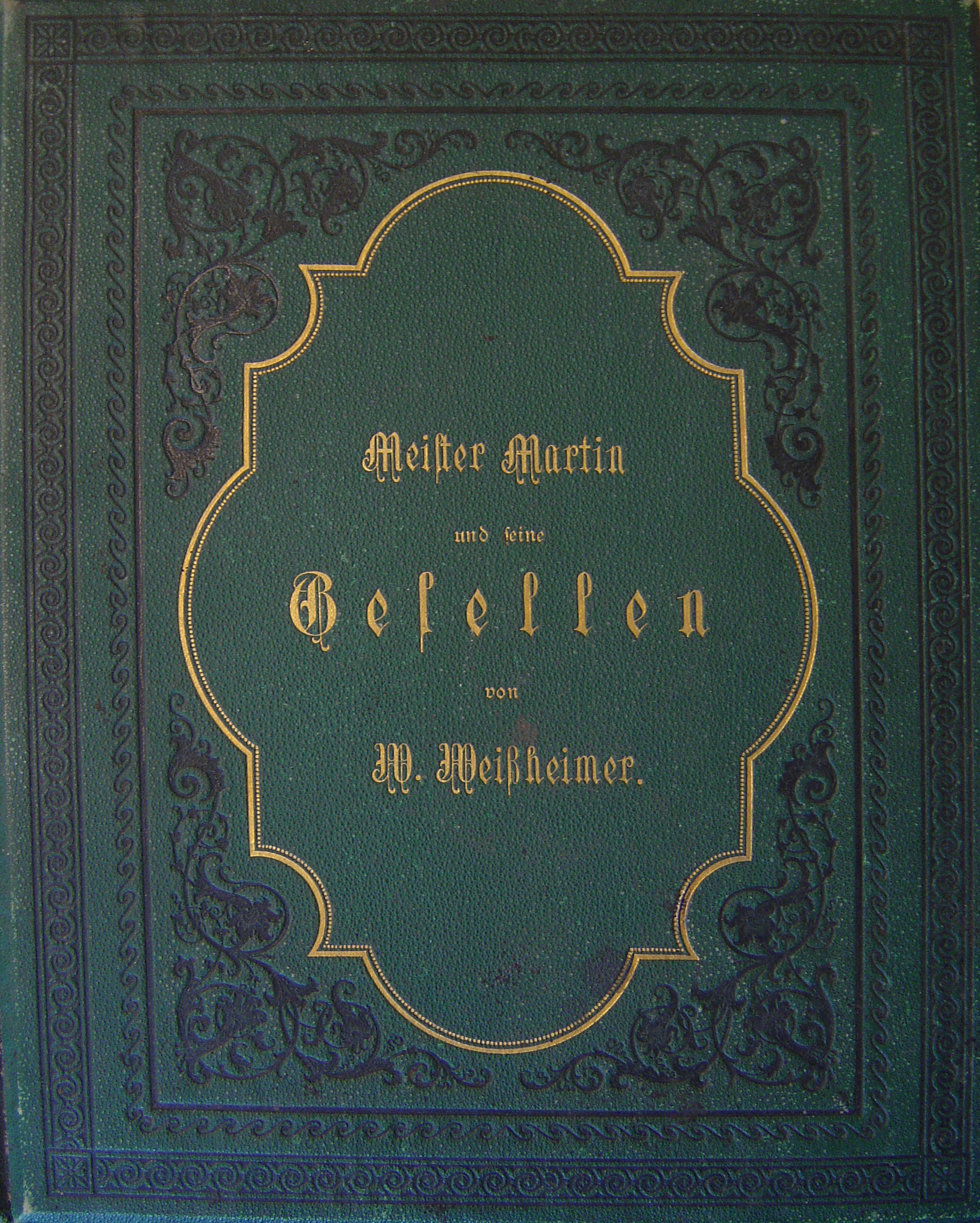
Opera score of Wendelin Weißheimer's Master Martin And His Companions

From Würzburg Weißheimer came again to conduct in Mainz. During the subsequent activity in Zurich, friendship linked him and his wife to the Wesendonck family. From 1873 to 1878, he worked in Strasbourg where his opera Master Martin And His Companions premiered on 14 April 1879 in Karlsruhe. Now Weißheimer moved to Baden-Baden where he became in charge of the larger spa concerts. Together with Otto Dessoff he headed the concerts of the artists meeting with the performance of his Master Martin and his companions in May 1880. In the large central lodge, Weißheimer listened to the performance together with Liszt and French composer Camille Saint-Saëns outright, receiving from both acclaimed recognition for his accomplishment. In the following years Wendelin Weißheimer conducted for several years despite personal disappointment, with continuing veneration of Wagner's genius, at the famous Teatro La Scala in Milan. He had his residence on the idyllic Lake Como.

Around 1893, Weißheimer moved to Freiburg im Breisgau in order to focus on his literary career. His 1898 book, Experiences with Richard Wagner, Franz Liszt and many other contemporaries saw three editions in one single year. Around 1900 he moved to Nuremberg and from Freiburg and Nuremberg the way led him back again more often to his native homeland at the Stone Mill. In the casino society there he spent hours with old friends whom he pleased most joyfully with improvisations on works by Wagner and Liszt and on his own compositions. In his last years, Weißheimer led mass choirs at social-democratic Party Congresses. His target was the huge masses of the workers' movement. When Weißheimer died on 16 June 1910 in Nuremberg, his death caused great turmoil. 30.000 unionized socialists paid him their respects and read obituaries of him in the leading newspapers.

== Works ==
Weißheimer left 106 works, including songs and choral cycles. Even though he tried compositionally to go his own way, he could not emerge from the shadow of his great teacher Liszt, and of Wagner.

His operas, his cantatas, and his instrumental music underline this. Even if his "absolute" music pays homage to one of the great string quartet and successful "obligatory violin parts" to Bach's Well-Tempered Clavier, he displays in his other works a clear tendency for program music. Weißheimer's piano pieces Reminiscence of Gioventu and At Beethoven's Grave, as well as his Symphony for Schiller's Knight Toggenburg match the spirit of the New German School. His literary taste is evident in the texts he set to music. German minstrel poems, texts by Johann Wolfgang von Goethe, Friedrich Schiller, Körner, Heinrich Heine and others found a musical home in his songs and cantatas.

Weißheimer summarized his individual compositions into larger cycles. Thus arose the 24 songs in the cycle "German minstrel," the 18 settings of Goethe, as well as songs from Heine and Körner, appeared for the men's choir "Eight Songs," along with previously unpublished choral cycles. After his departure with Wagner, Weißheimer turned increasingly to the labor movement and exercised with his compositions for male chorus a particular influence on the cultural aspirations of the Social Democratic Party of Germany.

=== Printed and frequently performed works ===
==== Operas ====
- 1863/1864 Lyre and sword, an alternative titles Theodor Körner (Text: Louise Otto-Peters); Patriotic Opera in Four Acts, premiered in 1872 at the Court and National Theater Munich.
- 1878 Master Martin And His Companions (on the story by E.T.A. Hoffmann), premiere at thee Grand Ducal Court Theatre in 1879 in Karlsruhe.

==== Symphonies ====
- 1860–1862 Ritter Toggenburg (Text: poem by Schiller; symphony for full orchestra), premiere: 1862 Leipzig Gewandhaus.
- 1870 To Mozart, Symphony for Small Orchestra; premiere Zurich 1871.

==== Songs and ballads ====
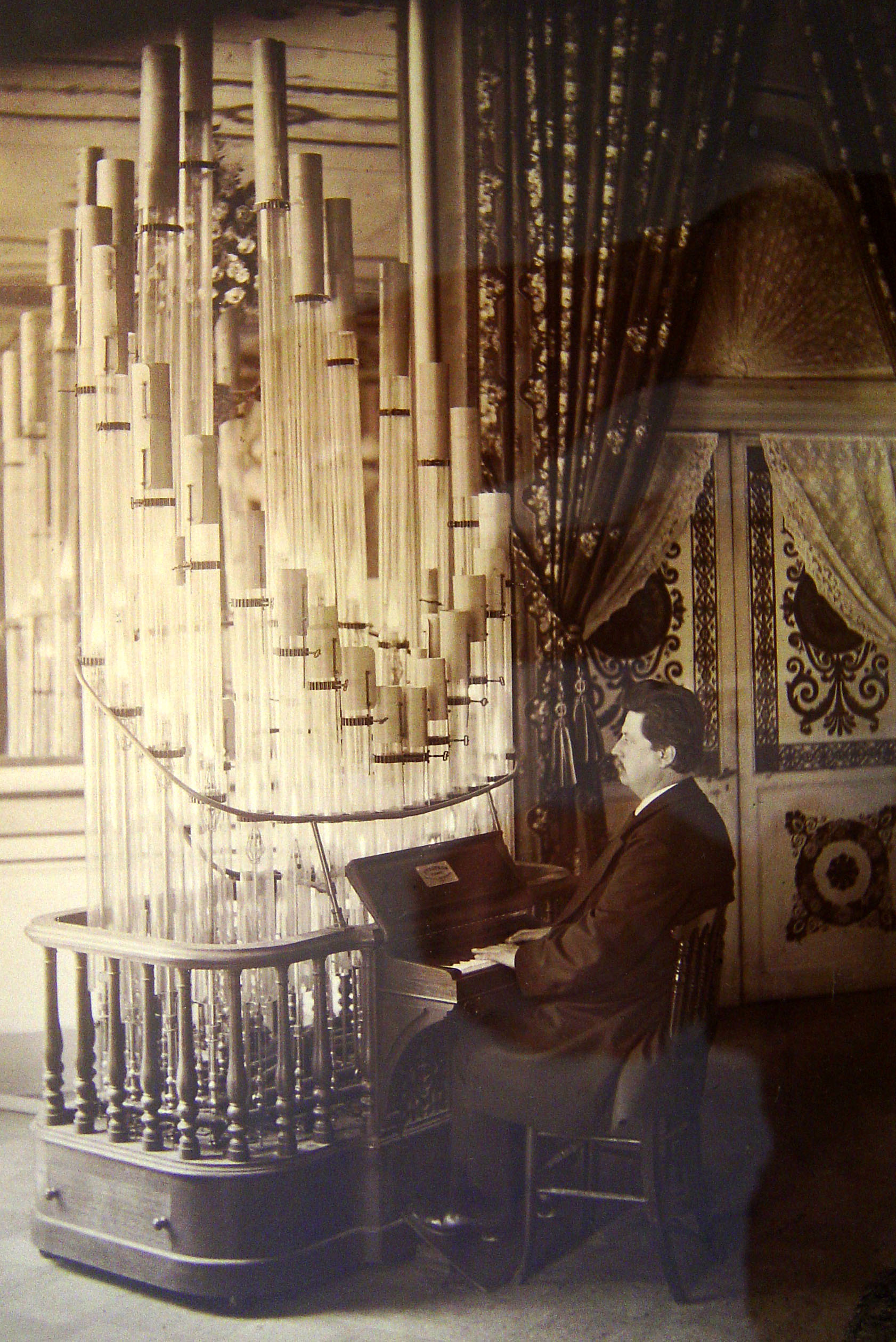
Wendelin Weißheimer plays on the Pyrophone, for which he composed Five Sacred Sonnets for Voice, Flute, Oboe, Clarinet, Pyrophone and Piano (1880).

- 1856 The Grave in Busento (Text: August von Platen-Travemünde Haller), ballad for bass solo, male choir and orchestra, premiered in 1857 / Leipzig.
- 1858/1859 King Sigfrid (Text: Ludwig Uhland), ballad for baritone or bass and piano, Opus 1, dedicated to Franz Liszt.
- 1864–1866 The big company (Text: poem by Franz von Gaudy), obituary to Ferdinand Lassalle.
- 1864–1866 Five Spiritual Sonnets (texts: poems by Theodor Körner)
  - Jesus and the Samaritan woman
  - Jesus and the sinner
  - The last supper
  - Epiphany in Emmaus
  - Ascension of Christ
- 1868/1869 German minstrel, song cycle, Debut book. Dietmar von Aist
  - No. 1 The searchers (Soprano)
  - No. 2 The separation (Soprano)
  - No. 3 Spring (Soprano)
- Second book: Der von Kürenberg
  - No. 1 The searchers (Soprano)
  - No. 2 The evening star (Mezzo-soprano or baritone)
  - No. 3 Love's sorrow (Mezzo-soprano)
  - No. 4 The lover farewell (Mezzo-soprano and baritone)
  - No. 5 Only one (Mezzo-soprano)
  - No. 6 Separation (Mezzo-soprano and baritone)
- Third book: Spervogel
  - No. 1 Virtue is the most beautiful dress (Mezzo-soprano or baritone)
  - No. 2 Rule of Life (Alt or bass)
  - No. 3 The Thor (Alto or bass)
  - No. 4 The evil time (Mezzo-soprano or baritone)
  - No. 5 The good host (Bass)
- Heinrich von Veldeke
  - No. 6 Love song (Tenor)
  - No. 7 Minnelied (baritone)
  - No. 8 Power of love (Tenor)
  - No. 9 Gray hair (baritone or bass)
- Wernher von Tegernsee
  - No. 10 Love Reim (Soprano or tenor)
- Folk songs from the 12th century
  - No. 11 Come, O come, my fellow
  - No. 12 I have pain in the heart (soprano)
- Fourth book: Christian von Hamle
  - No. 1 The Anger (Baritone or mezzo-soprano)
  - No. 2 Four eyes and two hearts (Baritone or mezzo-soprano)
  - No. 3 Guard Song (Soprano and baritone)
  - No. 4 Fidelity (Tenor)
  - No. 5 Frauenlob (Tenor)
- John I, Duke of Brabant
  - Herba lori fa (Soprano or tenor)
- 1869 Songs for voice and pianoforte
  - Whenever it would remain (Text: after a poem by Friedrich von Bodenstedt)
  - Do you ask with little eyes? (Text: after a poem by Peter Cornelius)
  - Swept (Text: after a poem by Paul Flemming)

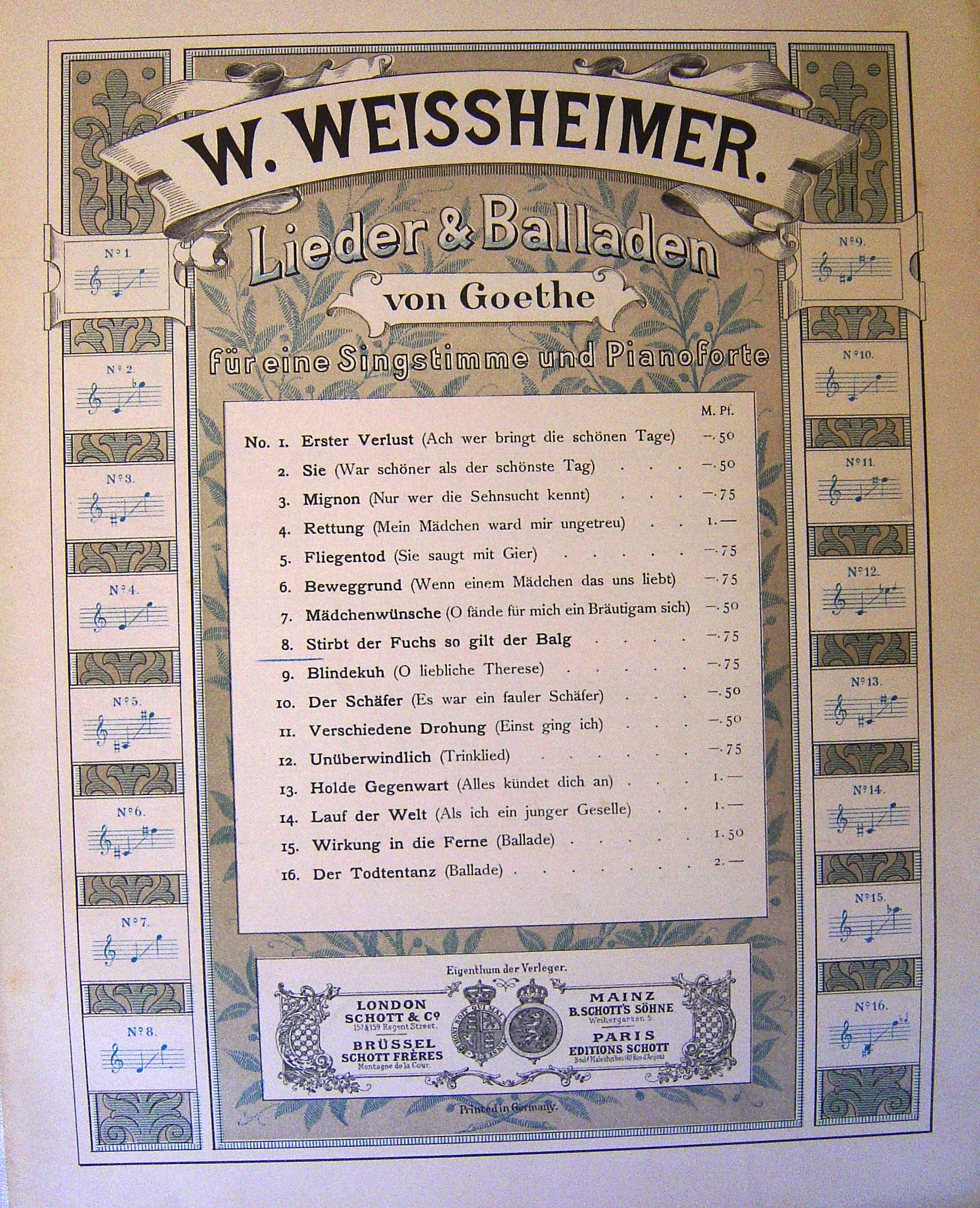
Wendelin Weißheimer's Songs and Ballads from Goethe.

- 1892–1896 Songs and ballads for voice and piano accompaniment (on poems by Johann Wolfgang von Goethe).
  - No. 1 First loss
  - No. 2 You!
  - No. 3 Mignon
  - No. 4 Rescue
  - No. 5 Fliegentod
  - No. 6 Beweggrud
  - No. 7 Girl wishes
  - No. 8 Die the fox, then the bellows
  - No. 9 Blindekuh
  - No. 10 The Shepherd
  - No. 11 Different threat
  - No. 12 Insuperable
  - No. 13 Graceful presence
  - No. 14 Over the world
  - No. 15 Effect in the distance (Ballad)
  - No. 16 The Dance of Death (Ballad)
  - No. 17 The singer
  - No. 18 The Pied Piper
- 1880 The lion's bride (after a poem by Adelbert von Chamisso); concert ballad for voice and orchestra (or piano).
- 1876 German National Anthem (Text: after a poem by F.W. Plath) for 4 male voices choir.

==== Other ====
- 1887–1891 An obligatory violin part to all preludes of Johann Sebastian Bach's Well-Tempered Clavier.
- 1895–1898 Epiphany (poem by Johann Wolfgang von Goethe) for male choir, tenor, baritone and bass solo.
- 1870–1899 Eight Songs for male chorus.
  - The Queen of England (folk song from the 12th century)
  - John Barleycorn (poem by Robert Burns)
  - German philistinism (poem by August Heinrich Hoffmann von Fallersleben)
  - Schneider Kourage (poem by Johann Wolfgang von Goethe)
  - The golden calf (poem by Heinrich Heine)
  - Just wait (poem by Heinrich Heine)
  - Enlightenment (poem by Heinrich Heine)
  - Promise (poem by Heinrich Heine)
  - Tendency song (poem by Heinrich Heine)
  - Bet 'and work' (song by Georg Herwegh) "Dedicated to the 25-year-old union of the Social Democracy of Germany and the Social-Democratic Party Congress of Mainz in 1900.
- 1900–1902 Kronzoll Strangler (poem by Robert Seidel for four-part male chorus.
- 1905 The free people, the free song Federal Parole from Wendelin Weißheimer.
- 1906 Three songs for male choir.
  - Up to the light (poem by Emanuel Wurm)
  - Deep in the earth's womb (poem by Robert Seidel)
  - Despite all this ("A salute to the reaction of Ferdinand Freiligrath")
  - German people and German freedom (poem by Robert Seidel); composition of the Social Democratic Party Congress in Mannheim 1906.
- 1906–1909 Three two-voice choir songs
  - Egyptian folk song 2500 years ago
  - Five Commandments of Moses
  - Drinking song
- 1909–1910 Two three-voice choir songs
- From the Christian doctrine: The early Christians and Jesus' siblings (after a poem by Max Maurenbrecher)
- From the nature lesson: Carrots, monkey, junker and gendarmes (poem by Ludwig Pfau)

=== Unpublished works ===
==== Operas ====
- The four-year post (after a libretto by Theodor Körner,) completed in 1867.
- Ingeborg of Denmark Opera in four acts by Wendelin Weißheimer, completed in 1884.
- The miraculous crucifix, Opera in three acts (according to a legend of C.F.D. Schubart), unfinished.

==== Cantatas ====
- Oh dear, as long as you can love (poem by Ferdinand Freiligrath) Cantata for soloists, chorus and orchestra, later working for women's choir.
- Does not dry the tears of eternal love (poem by Johann Wolfgang von Goethe) for chorus and orchestra, premiered at the Leipzig Gewandhaus 1862.
- Religioso (poem by Emanuel Geibel), Cantata for tenor solo, male chorus and large orchestra.
- Spring song (from Mirza Schaffy by Friedrich von Bodenstedt) for mixed chorus with soprano and tenor solo and piano or orchestra.
- The crickets and the poet or the worse visit (poem by Emanuel Geibel) for female choir, baritone solo and piano.
- The dance (poem by Paul Fleming) for mixed choir and piano.
- I want to cry (poem by Heinrich Heine) for tenor and orchestra, completed in 1859.
- To Fanny (ode by Friedrich Gottlieb Klopstock) for tenor and orchestra.

==== Choirs ====
- Choral songs for male and female voices – First book:
  - Sacred song (poem by Paul Flemming)
  - On the death of a newborn little daughter (poem by Paul Flemming)
  - Wedding song (poem by Johann Georg Jacobi)
  - To nature (poem by Friedrich Leopold Stolberg)
  - Faith, hope and love
- Book II: Songs and poems by Johann Wolfgang von Goethe
  - Who never ate his bread in tears
  - New Year
  - Delight of melancholy
  - Spring flower sorakel
  - Schneider-Courage
- Thirty-four part songs for male choir
  - Hymn (poem by Spervogel)
  - Folk song from the 12 century Hunter song (poem by Ernst Schulze)
  - Night song (poem by Johann Wolfgang von Goethe)
  - Rhine song (poem by Emanuel Geibel)

== See also ==
- Deutschlandlied

== Bibliography ==
- Wendelin Weißheimer: Erlebnisse mit Richard Wagner, Franz Liszt und vielen anderen Zeitgenossen (Leipzig & Mannheim, 1898)
- Wendelin Weißheimer. Eine Erinnerungsgabe zum Dritten Heimattag des Landkreises Worms in Osthofen am Rhein (1958), including:
  - Heinrich Beckenbach: "Wendelin Weißheimer. Ein rheinhessischer Kapellmeister-Komponist", pp. 7–19
  - Anton Maria Keim: "Wendelin Weißheimer zum 120. Geburtstag", pp. 21–24
  - Ernst Laaff: "Wendelin Weißheimer. Kapellmeister und Komponist aus dem Wagner-Kreis", pp. 25–34
  - Ernst Köhm: "Ansprache bei der Enthüllung des Wendelin-Weißheimer-Gedenksteins am 22. Juni 1958", pp. 35–41
- Hans-Peter Schilly: Der Nachlass des Osthofener Komponisten Wendelin Weißheimer (PhD thesis, Mainz, 1961)
- Hans-Dieter Elbert (ed.): Wendelin Weißheimers Begegnungen mit Franz Liszt und Richard Wagner (Worms Verlag, 2016)

=== References ===
- This article is based on the translation of the corresponding article on the German Wikipedia. A list of all contributors can be found there at the History section.
