= Pyrophone =

Musical instrument

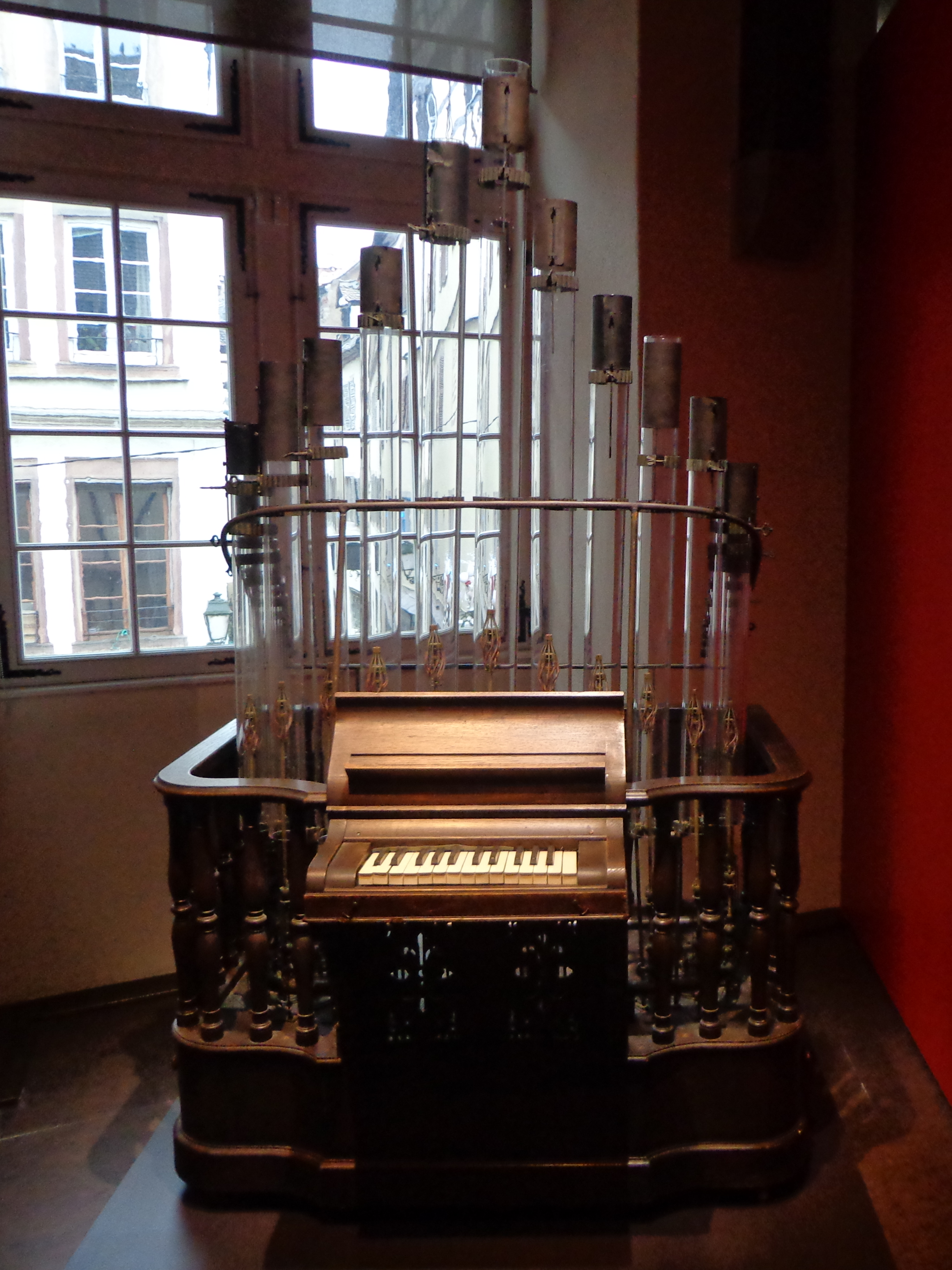
One of the pyrophones constructed by Kastner, as seen in 2013 in the Musée historique de Strasbourg

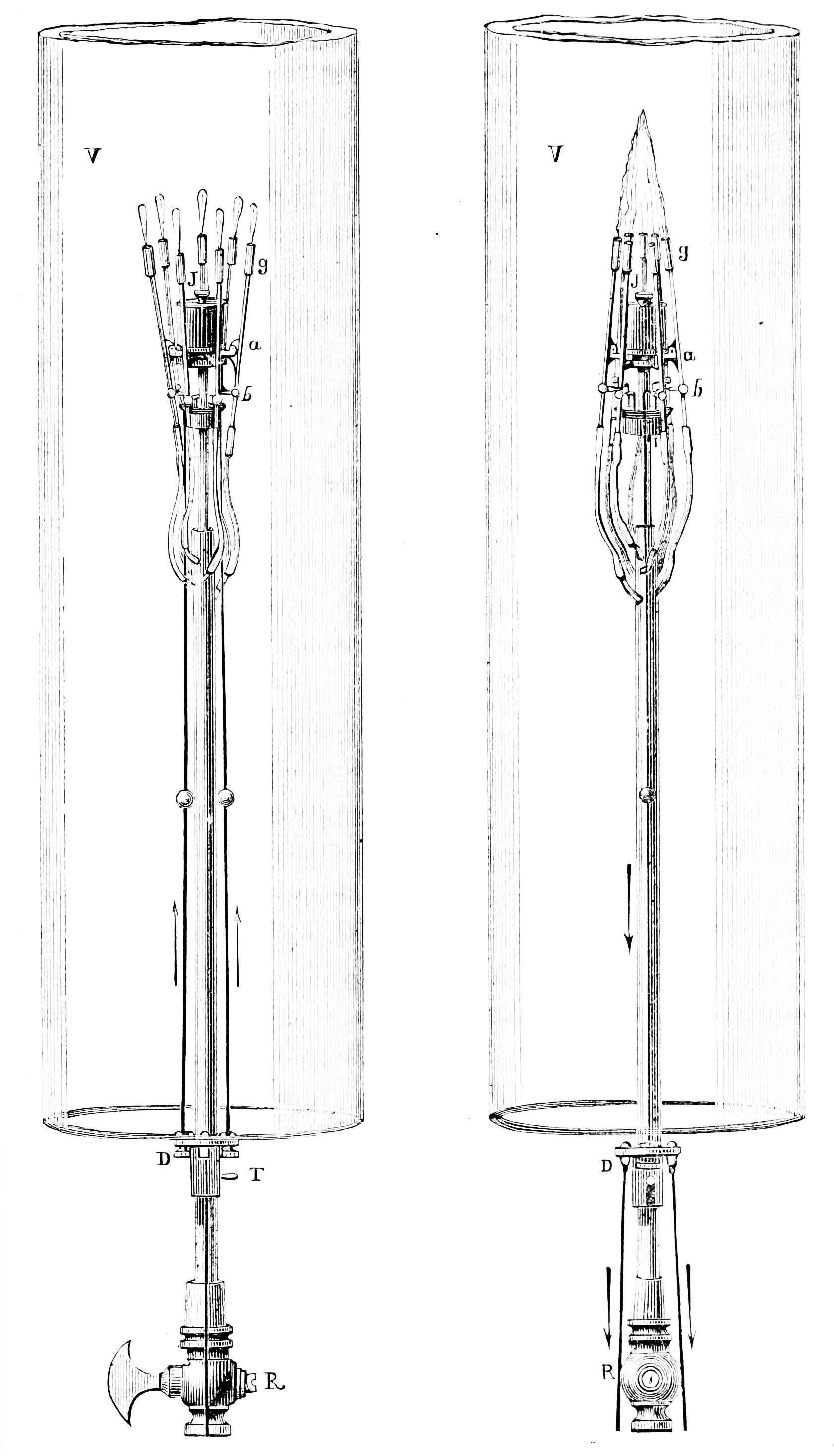
Durant's diagram of the sound-creating gas burners, the, "mechanisms that allowed two flames to unite or diverge to produce a musical note"

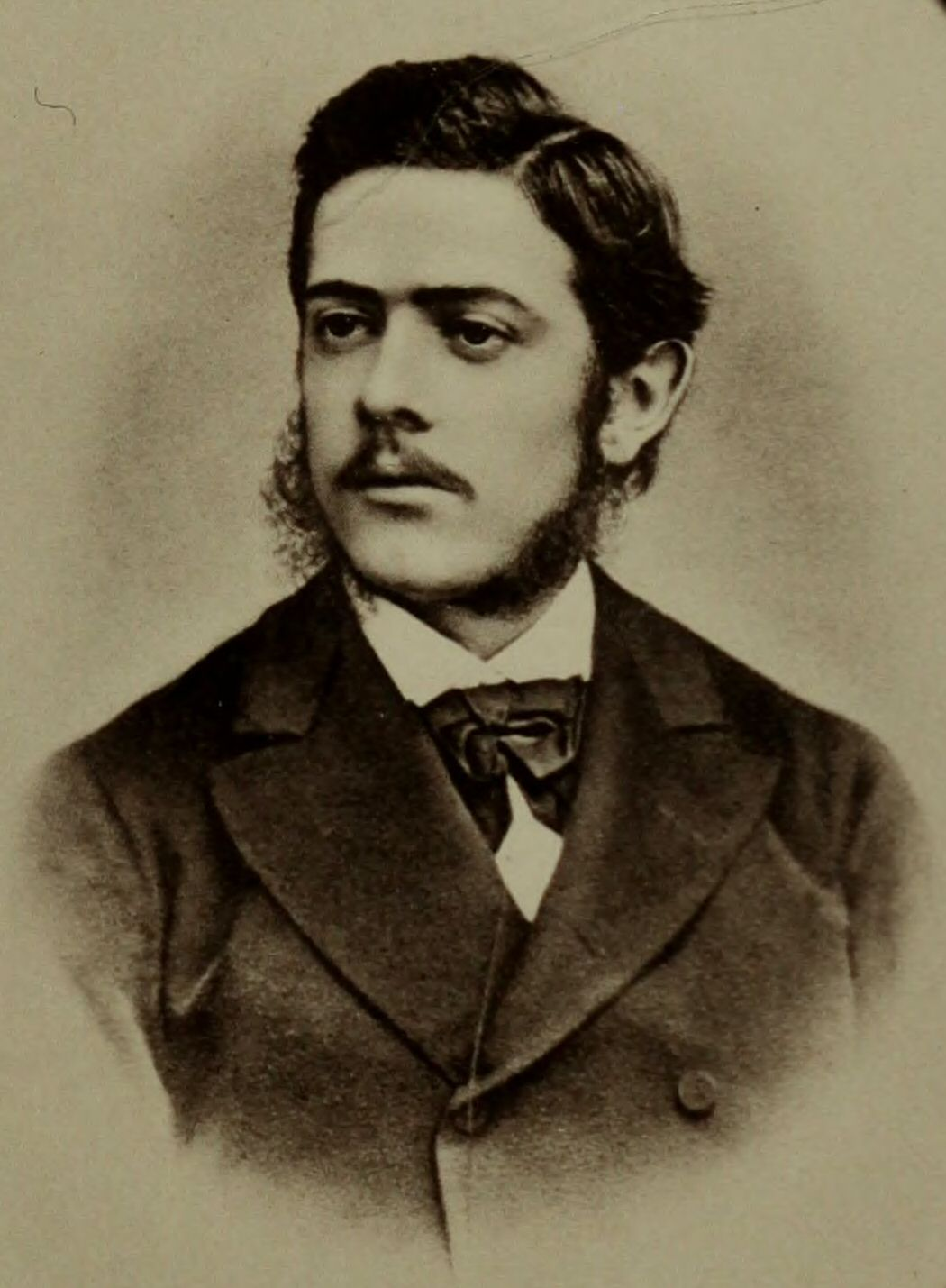
Kastner

A pyrophone, also known as a "fire/explosion organ" or "fire/explosion calliope", is a musical instrument in which notes are sounded by explosions, or similar forms of rapid combustion, rapid heating, or the like, such as burners in cylindrical glass tubes, creating light and sound. It was invented by physicist and musician Georges Frédéric Eugène Kastner (born 1852 in Strasbourg, France – died 1882 in Bonn, Germany), son of composer Jean-Georges Kastner, around 1870.

== Design ==
It is well known that if a flame of hydrogen gas be introduced within a glass or other tube, and if it be so placed as to be capable of vibrating, there is formed around this flame—that is to say, upon the whole of its enveloping surface—an atmosphere of hydrogen gas, which, in uniting with the oxygen in the air of the tube, burns in small portions, each composed of two parts of hydrogen to one of oxygen, the combustion of this mixture of gases producing a series of slight explosions or detonations.

If such a gaseous mixture, exploding in small portions at a time, be introduced at a point about one-third of the length of the tube from the bottom, and if the number of these detonations be equal to the number of vibrations necessary to produce a sound in the tube, all the acoustic conditions requisite to produce a musical tone are fulfilled.

This sound may be caused to cease either, first, by increasing or reducing the height of the flame, and consequently increasing or diminishing its enveloping surface, so as to make the number of detonations no longer correspond with the number of vibrations necessary to produce a musical sound in the tube, or, secondly, by placing the flame at such a height in the tube as to prevent the vibration of the enveloping film.

— Kastner's patent

== Related musical instruments ==
The pyrophone is similar to the steam calliope, but the difference is that in the calliope the combustion is external to the resonant cavity, whereas the pyrophone is an internal combustion instrument. The difference initially seems insignificant, but external combustion is what gives the calliope its staccato. Operating under the constant pressures of an external combustion chamber, the calliope merely directs exhaust (HB# 421.22: internal fipple flutes). By controlling the combustion specific to each resonant chamber, the pyrophone has, for better or worse, a greater range of variables in play when producing tones. In a purely mechanical (non-solenoid) calliope, the resulting pressures of external combustion result in between one and five pounds-force (4 and 22 N) of trigger pressure. In a mechanical pyrophone, trigger weight per key is related to comparatively lower backpressure of combustible gas. Again, the force of combustion happens in the resonance chamber; rather than controlling the exhaust of an explosion that has already happened in order to produce tones, the pyrophone controls the explosion to produce the tone.

== History ==
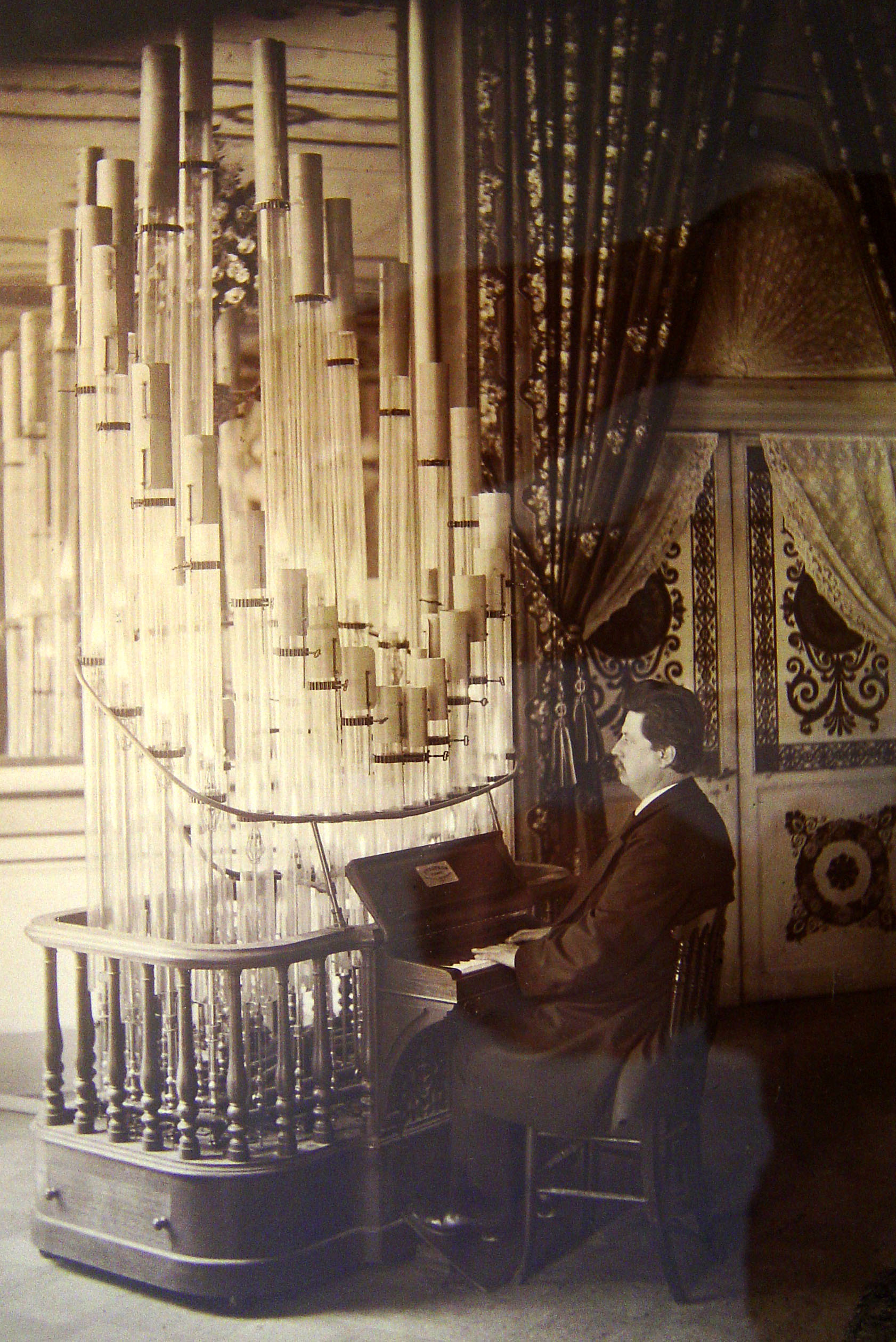
The German composer Wendelin Weißheimer playing a pyrophone

Pyrophones originated in the 19th century. Byron Higgins, using hydrogen burning within the bottom of an open glass tube, first pointed out that if flame is placed in a glass tube sound may be produced in 1777 and in 1818 Michael Faraday attributed the tones to very rapid explosions. Physicist John Tyndall demonstrated that flame(s) in a tube may be made to sound if they are placed close to one third the length of the tube, the explosion occurs at a rate which matches the fundamental or one of the harmonics of the tube, and the volume of the flame is not too great. Brewer, Moigno, and de Parville describe Kastner as having invented the instrument about twenty years before 1890, and he filed a patent on Christmas Eve of 1874. Charles Gounod attempted to include the organ in his opera Jeanne d'Arc (1873) and the instrument was shown in the Paris Exhibition (1878). Henry Dunant was a proponent, and Wendelin Weißheimer composed Five Sacred Sonnets for Voice, Flute, Oboe, Clarinet, Pyrophone and Piano (1880).

== Fuel sources ==
Pyrophones are usually powered by propane, but gasoline powered mobile units have been built, to connect to automobile fuel intake manifolds and use the spark plugs and wiring, etc., to detonate one or more of the chambers. Hydrogen pyrophones are often made using upside-down glass test tubes as the combustion chambers. Different colors were probably not achieved in Kastner's time, but would be possible with the addition of salts to the flames.

== See also ==
- Pulsation reactor
- Rijke tube
- Thermoacoustics
