= Pulsation reactor =

Chemical reactor for creating fine powders with precisely controlled properties

Pulsation reactor technology is a thermal procedure for manufacturing fine powders with precisely defined properties.

Pulsation reactor technology is a thermal procedure with a special functional principle that results in reaction parameters and a reaction medium, and which ultimately leads to other property parameters in terms of surface, reactivity, homogeneity and particle size of the powder material.

The technology has proven particularly effective in the manufacture of ceramic and submicroscale powders, as well as in the production of highly active catalysts. Also, simple oxides such as zirconium oxide with doping elements or mixed oxides like spinel can be produced in the pulsation reactor.

== History ==
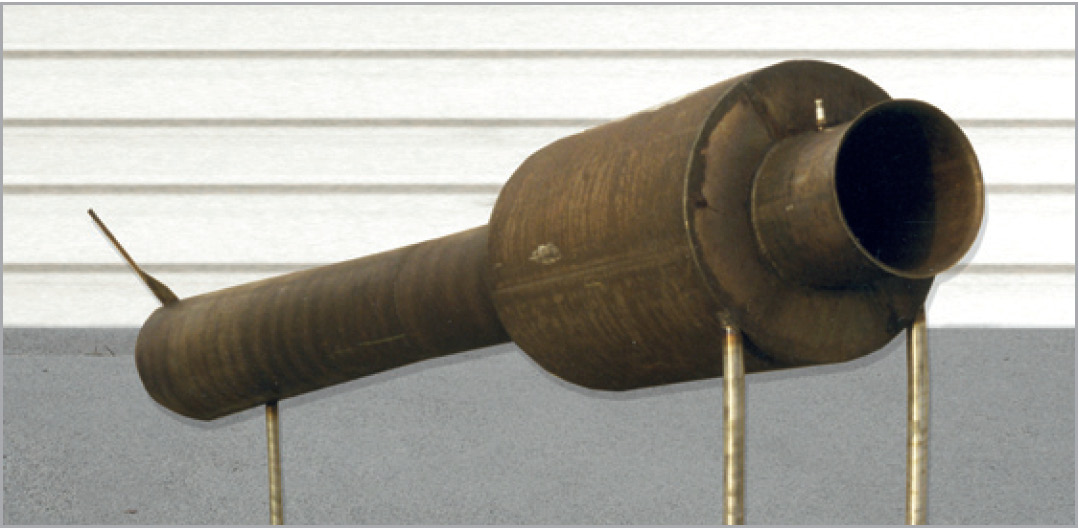
Self-priming ARGUS-Schmidt pipe

A British scientist called B. Higgins discovered the phenomenon of the pulsating flame in 1777. The phenomenon was described in specialist literature as the “singing flame”. However, no suitable application was found until 1930. Paul Schmidt was the first to employ the pulsating flame with the invention of the ARGUS-Schmidt pipe (Figure 1). Pulsating combustion was also used to generate hot gas for heating purposes and to fire boilers.

The principle was tested in the eighties at the SKET Institute in Weimar to determine the suitability of pulsating combustion as a unit for performing thermal, material-modifying processes. The unit was already being referred to as a pulsation reactor by the Institute at that time. As well as the process of cement clinker firing, the manufacture of polishing agents from iron oxalate for the optical industry and the manufacture of surface-active catalyst substrates from gibbsite were also investigated.

Pulsation reactor technology came to the fore in the nineties through its use in environmental technology, particularly in sludge drying and the regeneration of resin-bonded foundry sands. From 2000, the pulsation reactor was used to produce catalytic powders on an industrial scale.

The principle of pulsating combustion was developed over the years by the company IBU-tec advanced materials AG (which emerged from the SKET Institute and still exists today), which finally tested and commissioned another test facility in 2008. Thanks to the continuous optimisation of the reactors, it was now possible to use an oxidising, inert or reducing hot gas atmosphere to treat materials as required. It also emerged that the improved plant was particularly suitable for manufacturing fine particles and catalytic powders.

Today, pulsation reactor technology has become established in chemical process engineering for manufacturing active particles with microstructural properties.

== Structure and functionality ==
Fundamentally, a pulsation reactor can be described as a periodically transient tube-type reactor that can be used to thermally treat gas-borne matter. The pulsating flow of hot gas is generated within a hot gas generator in the reactor by burning natural gas or hydrogen with ambient air. The hot gas flows through the so-called “resonance tube” into which reactants in powder, liquid, or gas form can be added. The reactant is treated by hot gas flowing through the resonance tube and this process ends through suitable cooling. The finished product is separated by a cleanable filter. The product can be removed throughout the ongoing process using a sluice system and collected in barrels or big bags. The risk of the product contaminating the environment can be completely excluded through the vacuum present in the reactor, including the filter.

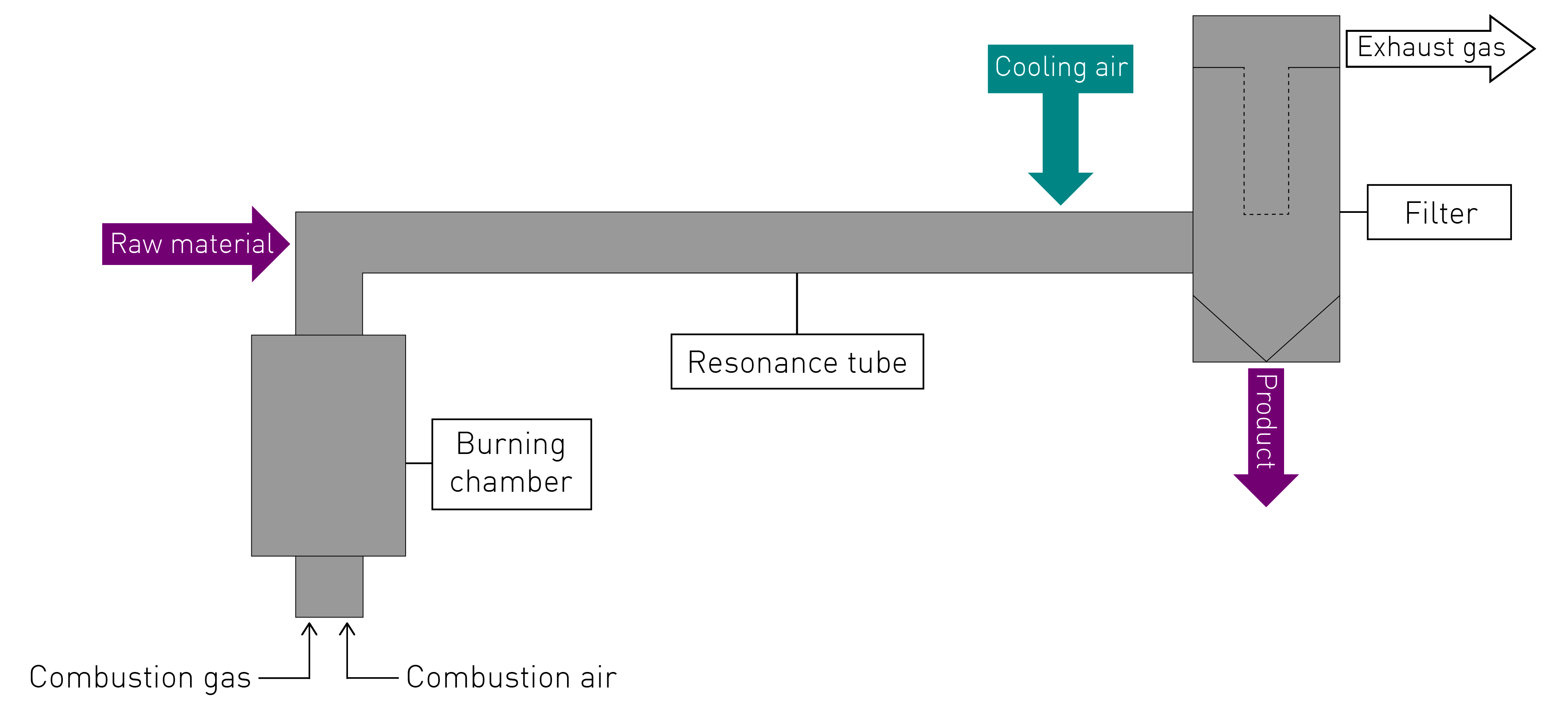
Schematic structure of a pulsation reactor

An almost tube-like flow with an almost constant temperature across the pipe diameter is generated in the resonance tube (the treatment area for the reactant) through the pulsating flow of hot gas. This tube-shaped flow results in a narrow residence time distribution. Furthermore, the pulsating hot gas flow results in an increased convective heat and mass transfer to and/or from the particles.

Hot gas can be generated in two different ways. Either the hot gas generator works with a high level of excess air (λ ≥ 2) or the hot gas atmosphere can be generated with little oxygen or none at all. The hot gas temperatures in the pulsation reactor range from 250° - 1,350 °C (expansion to higher temperatures is in progress). However, the actual treatment temperature may differ significantly from these values after the reactant has been added. The necessary treatment temperature can be determined through systematic experiments with temperature variation.

In addition to the treatment temperature and the type of hot gas atmosphere, pulsation reactors also provide the option of adjusting the frequency and amplitude of the pulsation (i.e. the spatially oscillating flow of hot gas) according to the material to be treated, without changing the geometry of the plant.

== Specific process features ==
The pulsating flow of hot gas in the pulsation reactor enables very high heating rates and a significantly increased transfer of heat from the hot gas to the particle in the thermal process. This is beneficial for determining a specific particle size, surface condition and phase composition.

The use of combustible reactants is not essential with the pulsation reactor. Both combustible and non-combustible reactants can be used in it.

The even temperature distribution in the reactor well and the narrow residence time distribution prevents the formation of hard aggregates whilst allowing the homogenous treatment of material.

The temperature range covered by the pulsation reactor is considerably higher than in spray dryers, for example, so that gentle drying is only possible to a certain extent but a combination of drying and calcination is feasible.

=== Properties of the pulsation reactor ===
- Spraying of fluids, suspensions and solids (powder) as material feed
- short residence time Ƭ: 100 ms – 10 s
- greatly increased heating & cooling rates
- Material treatment temperature : 250 °C – 1350 °C
- Improved heat and mass transfer rates due to resulting pressure and velocity fluctuations of the pulsation (200-500%)
- homogeneous temperature distribution
- Oxidizing, oxygen-free or reducing hot gas atmospheres

=== Valuable material properties ===
- increased reactivity of materials
- specific surface of particles
- avoidance of agglomeration
- highly homogeneous material properties (e.g. tight particle size distribution)
- achievable particle size range from submicroscale to microscale

== Application ==
- Catalysts (automotive, industry)
- High-performance ceramics (bioceramics, optoceramics, insulation ceramics)
- UV-protection
- Pigments (paint and varnish, cosmetics, glass, ceramic, porcelain)
- Battery substances (electrode materials, coating materials)
- Luminescent materials
- Additives (flame protection, anticorrosives, thickening agent)
- Filler material (bulking, isolation material)
- Pyrotechnics and advanced explosives, such as metastable intermolecular composites (MICs)

== Patents ==
- Patent applicationnn : Process for the preparation of garnet phosphors in a pulsation reactor. registered 21. May 2007, published 30. July 2009, Inventors: Stefan Ambrosius, Lars Leidolph.
- Patent application : Method and thermal reactor for creating particles. registered 28. September 2007, published 26. August 2009, Applicant: IBU-tec advanced materials AG, Inventors: Stefan Ambrosius, Lars Leidolph.
- Patent application WO2007144060 A1: Verfahren zur herstellung von granat-leuchtstoffen in einem pulsationsreaktor. registered 21. May 2007, published 21. December 2007, Applicant: Merck Patent GmbH, Inventors: Gerd Fischer, Tarek Khalil, Lars Leidolph, Holger Winkler.
- Patent application WO2002072471 A2: Verfahren zur herstellung von multinären metalloxidpulvern in einem pulsationsreaktor. registered am 6. March 2002, published 19. September 2002, Applican: Merck Patent GmbH, Inventors: Stefan Remke, Bernd Mueller, Guenter Riedel, Stefan Ambrosius, Bernd Dahm.
- Patent application DE102006046803 A1: Verfahren und thermischer Reaktor zur Herstellung von Partikeln. registered am 29. September 2006, published 3. April 2008, Applican: Ibu-Tec Gmbh & Co. KG, Inventors: Stefan Ambrosius, Lars Leidolph.
- Patent application DE102006039462 B4: Verfahren zur Herstellung von Partikeln. registered am 23. August 2006, published 18. February 2010, Applican: Ibu-Tec advanced materials AG, Inventors: Gerd Fischer, Tarek Khalil, Lars Leidolph.

== Sources ==
- S. Begand, B. Dahm, S. Ambrosius: Einsatz des Pulsationsreaktors für die Stoffbehandlung in der chemischen Industrie. In: Chemie Ingenieur Technik. Volume 70, Issue 6, 1998, p. 746–749.
