= Theodor Körner (opera) =

Opera by Wendelin Weißheimer

- Opera by Wendelin Weißheimer
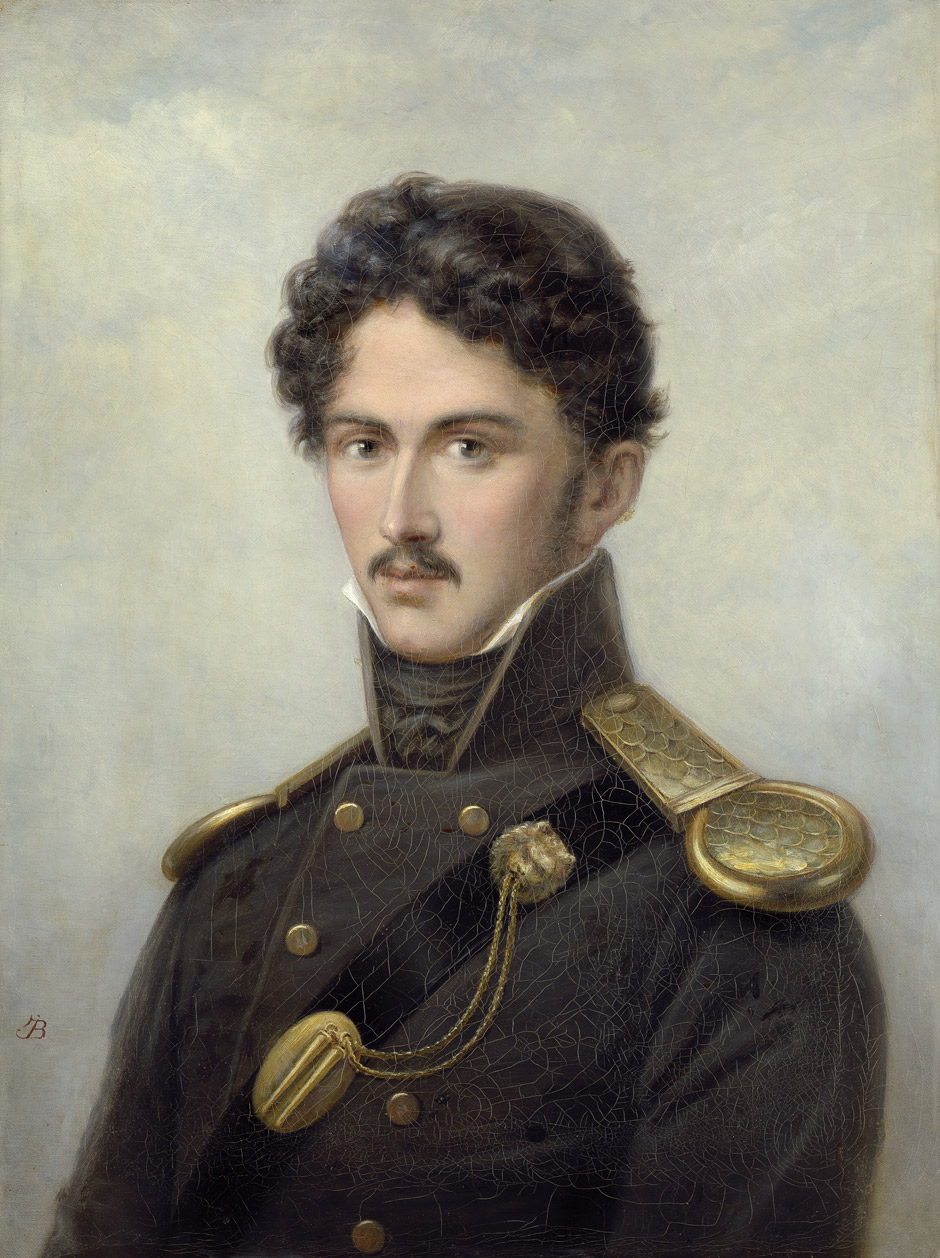
- The opera's protagonist, German poet and soldier Theodor Körner
- Librettist: Louise Otto-Peters
- Premiere: 1872; Hoftheater in Munich

Leyer und Schwert (Lyre and Sword) (modern German spelling Leier und Schwert) is a patriotic opera in five acts composed by Wendelin Weißheimer to a libretto by Louise Otto-Peters. Also known as Theodor Körner, the opera was composed in 1863/64 and premiered in Munich in 1872. The libretto is based on an episode in the life of the German poet and soldier Theodor Körner.

== History ==
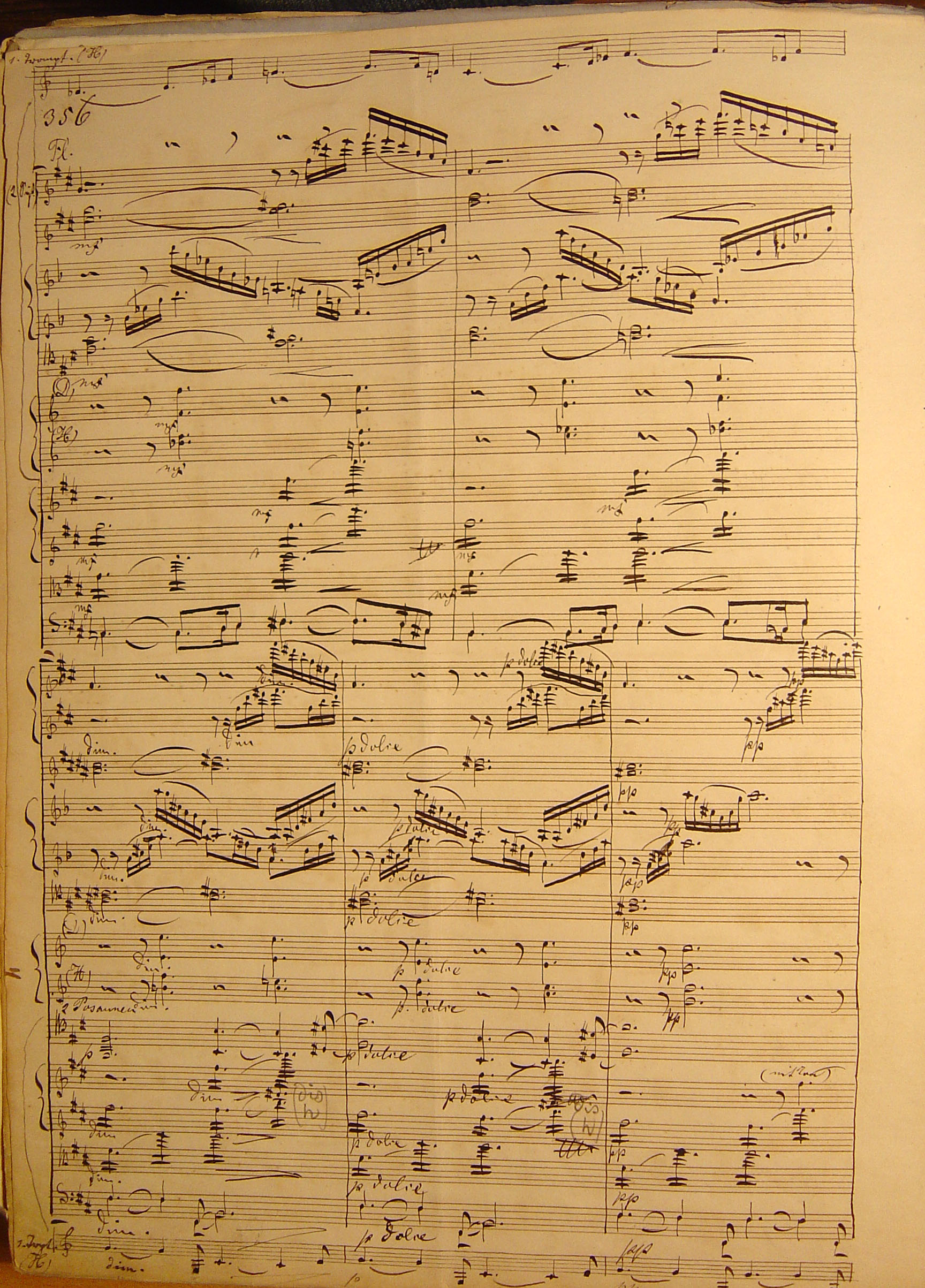
Original notes from Weißheimer's Theodor Körner

The libretto was written by Louise Otto-Peters, who had already shown ardent interest in patriotic subjects as a youth. It depicts the last episode of Theodor Körner's life from the beginning of his military engagement until his death. Körner, a famous German poet during the Wars of Liberation against Napoleonic hegemony, was free of personal worries due to his professional success culminating in the appointment as k. k. Hoftheaterdichter, a playwright of the imperial court at the Burgtheater in Vienna. He nonetheless voluntarily joined the famous Lützow Free Corps as he wanted to deliver Germany from French dominance, writing to his father: "Yes, my dearest father, I want to become a soldier. I want to give up the newly acquired happy and carefree live joyously in order to fight for my fatherland, even if I have to spill my blood. […] No one is too valuable for the death for the liberty and the honour of his nation, but many are not valuable enough." In 19th-century Germany, Körner hence became a national hero.

Franz Liszt and Richard Wagner spoke appreciatively of this work. Ferdinand Lassalle, who had particularly liked the libretto and was equally enthusiastic about the music, had offered to write Weißheimer a textbook on Florian Geyer, Thomas Munzer or the Bohemian Jan Žižka, but his death put an end to this idea. Wagner had written for Weißheimer a draft for the opera, Wieland the Blacksmith, but gave it back before scoring it. For the premiere of Theodor Körner at the Berlin Court Opera, Liszt began with the former artistic director Count von Redern. However, Count von Redern recommended Liszt to run the premiere on a different stage because Prince Louis Ferdinand was to play a role which would affect the Prussian royal family too strongly. For the premiere to be accommodated elsewhere it would be important to gain Wagner's support, for whom Wendelin had fought for many years. But Wagner was too immersed in his own work to be of any help. Weißheimer's negotiations with Munich moved very slowly but in 1872, his opera was finally premiered there.

== Scoring and structure ==
Leyer und Schwert is an opera in five acts and a prelude:

=== Prelude ===
„Deutschland muss siegen oder untergeh’n.“ —
"Germany must be victorious or cease to exist."

Three citizens talk about the current state of French-occupied Germany. As one of them starts to talk about liberation from foreign yoke, the others burst into fear. Subsequently, Major von Lützow appears, surrounded by a large crowd, reading a declaration by the king of Prussia that incites all citizens to enlist. Körner, one of the people encircling the major, starts to publicly support the appeal to deliver Germany from its enemies. Recognised by one of the three citizens from the beginning of the scene, Körner frenetically exalts liberty and joins the Freikorps.

=== Act 1 ===
„Mich ruft die Pflicht, mich ruft das Vaterland. / […] Wenn sich das Volk erhebt, / So nehm auch ich das Schwert in meine Hand!“ —
"Duty calls me, and the fatherland. / […] When the people starts to fight, / I will draw the sword as well!"

Toni, Körner's betrothed, awaits her fiancé who appears only to inform her that he must leave in order to fight for the liberation of Germany. In spite of her own patriotism, Toni tries to convince Körner that he can also be a benefit to the fatherland in his role as a poet: „Diene der Kunst, du dienst der deutschen Sache.“ ("Serve art, and you serve Germany.") In the third scene of this act, several public officers appear and inform Theodor of his appointment as poet of the court in Vienna, thus providing new hope for Toni, but Körner finally decides that German art can only flourish if the German nation does, and this must be ensured by the sword. After several farewell kisses, he leaves.

=== Act 2 ===
"Hier kümmert niemand Rang und Stand: / Wir denken nur ans Vaterland." —
"Here, no one cares for your rank or class: / We only think of the fatherland."

The second act opens in a recruitment office where Elise von Ahlefeld-Lützow and Friedrich Friesen as well as two volunteers are present. Körner arrives and looks for Lützow, who appears in the second scene, accompanied by many of his soldiers, and immediately recognises him. Both attend a church service where the priest commits the members of the Freikorps to the cause. The scene and thereby the act end with a rendition of Luther's chorale "Ein feste Burg ist unser Gott" ("A Mighty Fortress Is Our God").

=== Act 3 ===
„Es kommt die Zeit zur guten Sache, / Zur Freiheit, zum Tyrannentod.“ —
"The time for our good cause will come, / For liberty and tyrant's death."

In a forest near Leipzig, Lützow's cavalry roams the area, looking for enemies to fight. The disappointment of the soldiers who in vain seek battle is aggrandized when they learn that a truce has been concluded. Lützow and his men reject it because they think that endless negotiations will be to the disadvantage of Germany. In lieu of debating, the war should be brought to an end by arms. Suddenly, however, the enemy attacks, thus breaking the armistice. Körner is wounded and hides himself so that no one finds him. Two civilians, Häusser and a farmer, have seen the skirmish and trace Körner's hideout back. Undetected by the French, they bring him to Häusser's house.

=== Act 4 ===
„Der deutschen Frauen Opfermut / Errettet mir das Vaterland.“ —
"The courage of German women / Saves the fatherland."

There, Häusser's wife Johanna takes care of the unconscious soldier. When Körner awakes, he learns what has happened and thanks Johanna for her help. She replies that everyone would have saved such a hero who so valiantly fought for the fatherland. Indeed, Körner is already that famous that Häusser is accompanied by several farmers in the second scene who only wish to see the wounded warrior. As he feels well enough again, Körner, Johanna and Häusser make a plan for his escape. Häusser insinuates that he has friends in Leipzig who would be willing to support the hero if they were informed in advance. Johanna volunteers to smuggle a letter into the city, thus instruction Häusser's friend. After having praised the courage of German women, Körner leaves for Leipzig.

=== Act 5 ===
„Weh! Er ist tot, der Edelste von allen!“ —
"Alack! He is dead, the most noble of them all!"

Körner meets Lützow, Friesen and Elise again. Their joyous reunion is disrupted when they are informed that the enemy is approaching. During the following dialogue between him and Elise, Körner divines his forthcoming death and finally sets off to fight. The battle is won, but Körner's foreboding was right: His dead body is carried by several soldiers. Bemoaning the loss of his friend, Lützow orders his Freikorps to leave for battle and venge the death of their hero.

== Current situation ==
The score only exists in Weißheimer's handwriting. In 2013, some parts of it were transliterated by order of the Louise-Otto-Peters-Gesellschaft. These excerpts were performed in a version for piano in cooperation with the Hochschule für Musik und Theater Leipzig, and recorded. Due to financial reasons, a full transliteration of the score and a performance of the entire opera are currently not envisaged.
