= Ritter Toggenburg =

"Sir Toggenburg" ("Ritter Toggenburg") is a ballad by Friedrich Schiller, written in 1797, the year of his friendly ballad competition with Goethe. The text was used to inspire a symphonic poem of the same name by the New German composer and conductor Wendelin Weißheimer. Its premiere was given in Leipzig on 1 November 1862, though factions of the Leipzig public boycotted the concert, and the hall was only half full.
