= Jean-Georges Kastner =

Alsatian composer

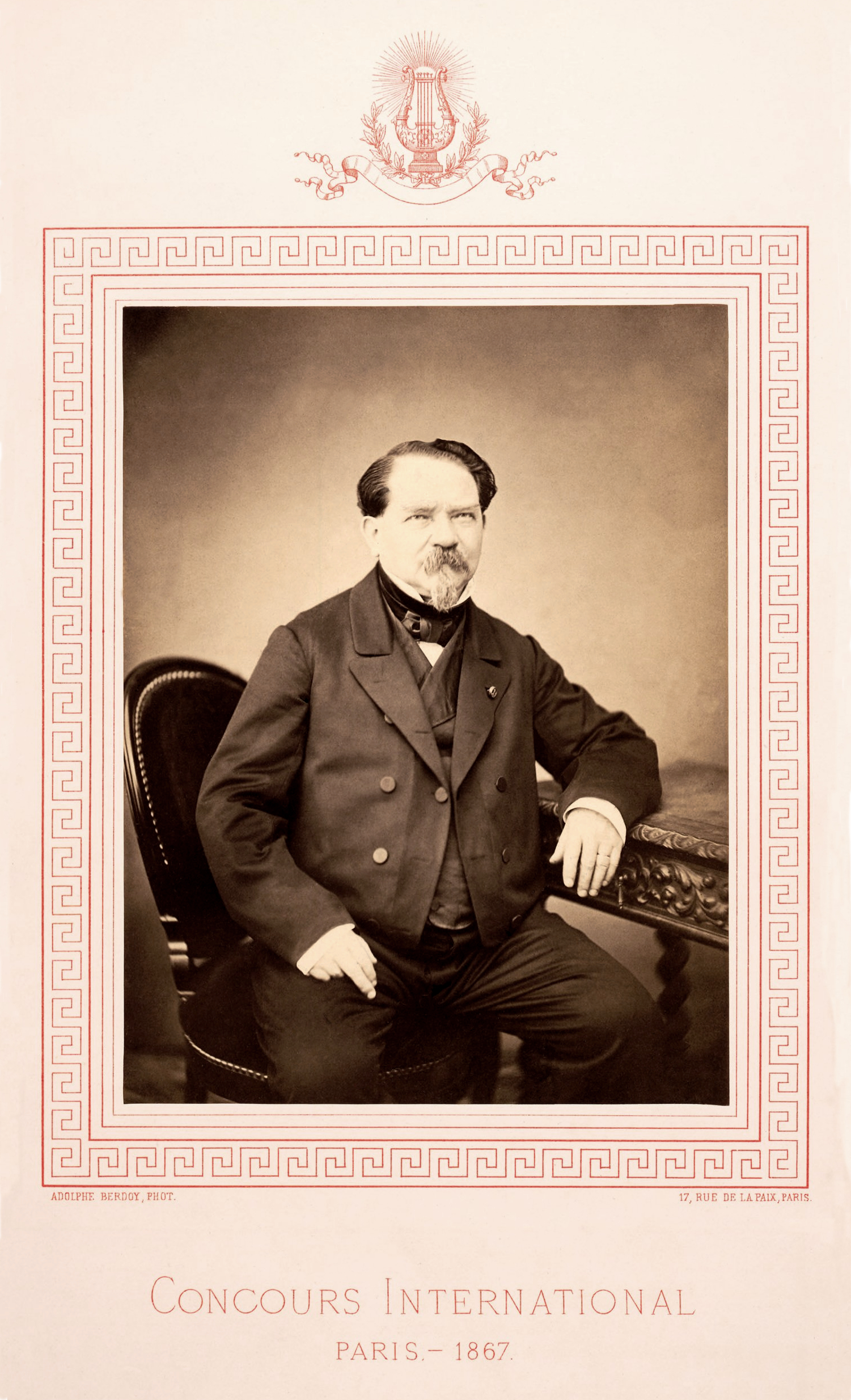
Jean-Georges Kastner (1867)

Jean-Georges Kastner, born 9 March 1810 in Strasbourg, died 19 December 1867 in Paris, was a composer and musicologist.

== Biography ==
Kastner's parents were Johann Georg Kastner, from Dettwiller, and Marie Salome Pfeiffer, from Woerth. Despite his interest in music, Kastner studied theology at the University of Strasbourg at the request of his father from 1827 to 1832. After the premiere of his opera The Queen of the Sarmatian in 1835 in Strasbourg, the city council granted him a scholarship to the Paris Conservatoire where he studied with Anton Reicha and Henri Montan Berton.

Kastner's strongest interest was in wind music, and he was especially interested in the instrumental inventions of Adolphe Sax. His compositions for saxhorn and alto saxophone were among the earliest works written for these instruments. Included in his Manuel général de musique militaire (1848) are some of the earliest illustrations of Sax's instruments.

On 16 May 1837 he married his student in Paris, Léonie Kastner-Boursault. Since Léonie was wealthy, her husband could practice his profession without any financial worries. Kastner was the father of physician and musician Frédéric Kastner, inventor of the pyrophone.

Later in his career, while based in Paris, his notable students included the French-born composer and musicologist Frédéric Louis Ritter.

== Works ==
- Livres-partitions
- La danse macabre, 1852
- Les Chants de la vie, 1854
- Le chant de l'armée française, 1855
- Les cris de Paris, 1857
- La rève d'Oswald on les sirènes, 1856

== Literature ==
- Manuel général de musique militaire à l'usage des armées françaises, Firmin Didot Frères, 1848
- Les Chants de l'armée française, Brandus, Dufour & Cie, 1855

== See also ==
=== Bibliography ===
- Hermann Ludwig von Jan, "Johann Georg Kastner, ein elsässischer Tondichter, Theoretiker und Musikforscher - sein Werden und Wirken", Breitkopf & Härtel, Leipzig, 1886, 3 vol.
- Charles Baechler, New Dictionary of Alsatian biography, vol. 20 Federation of History and Archaeology of Alsace, Strasbourg, 1993, published 1894-1895.
