= Louise Otto-Peters =

German suffragist, activist and writer

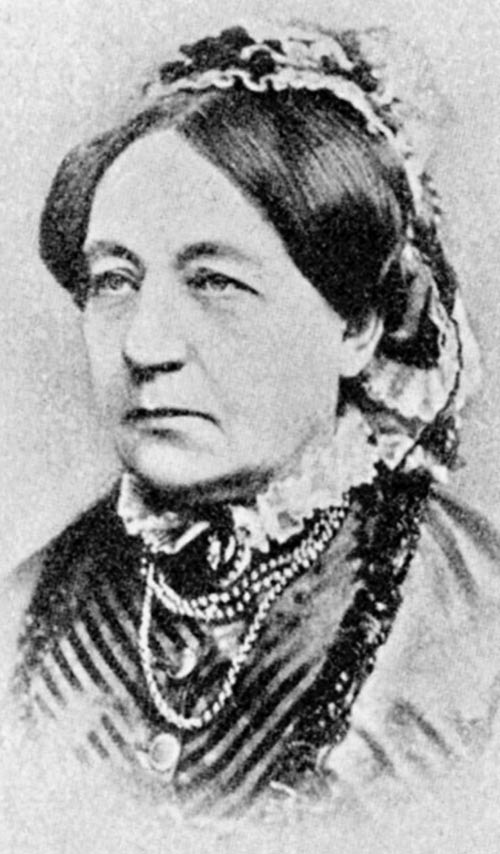
Louise Otto-Peters

Louise Otto-Peters (26 March 1819, Meissen – 13 March 1895, Leipzig) was a German suffragist and women's rights movement activist who wrote novels, poetry, essays, and libretti. She wrote for Der Wandelstern [The Wandering Star] and Sächsische Vaterlandsblätter [Saxon Fatherland Pages], and founded Frauen-Zeitung and Neue Bahnen specifically for women. She is best known as the founder in 1865 of the General German Women's Association (Allgemeiner Deutscher Frauenverein).

== Life ==
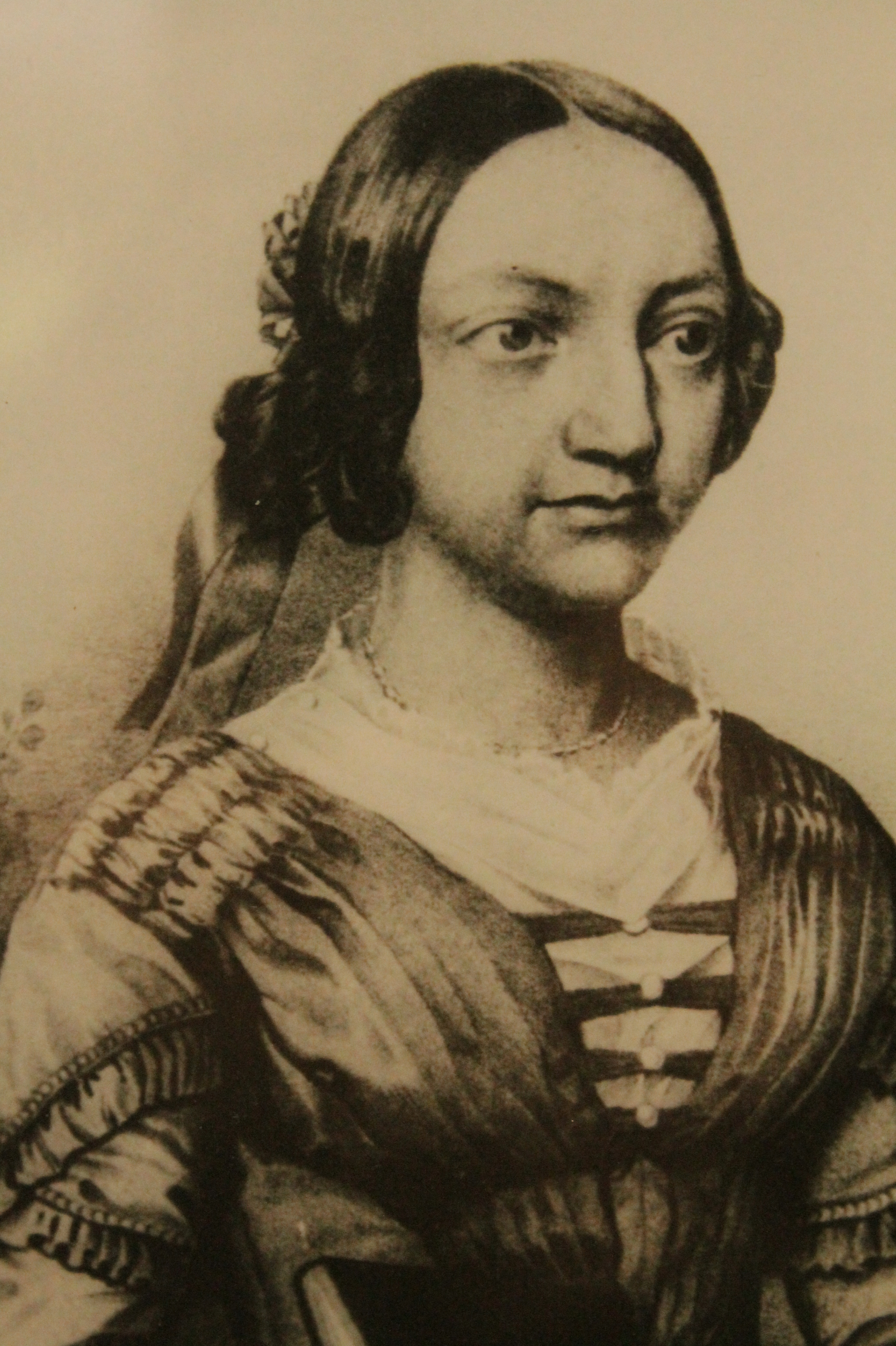
Louise Otto-Peters, lithograph c. 1848

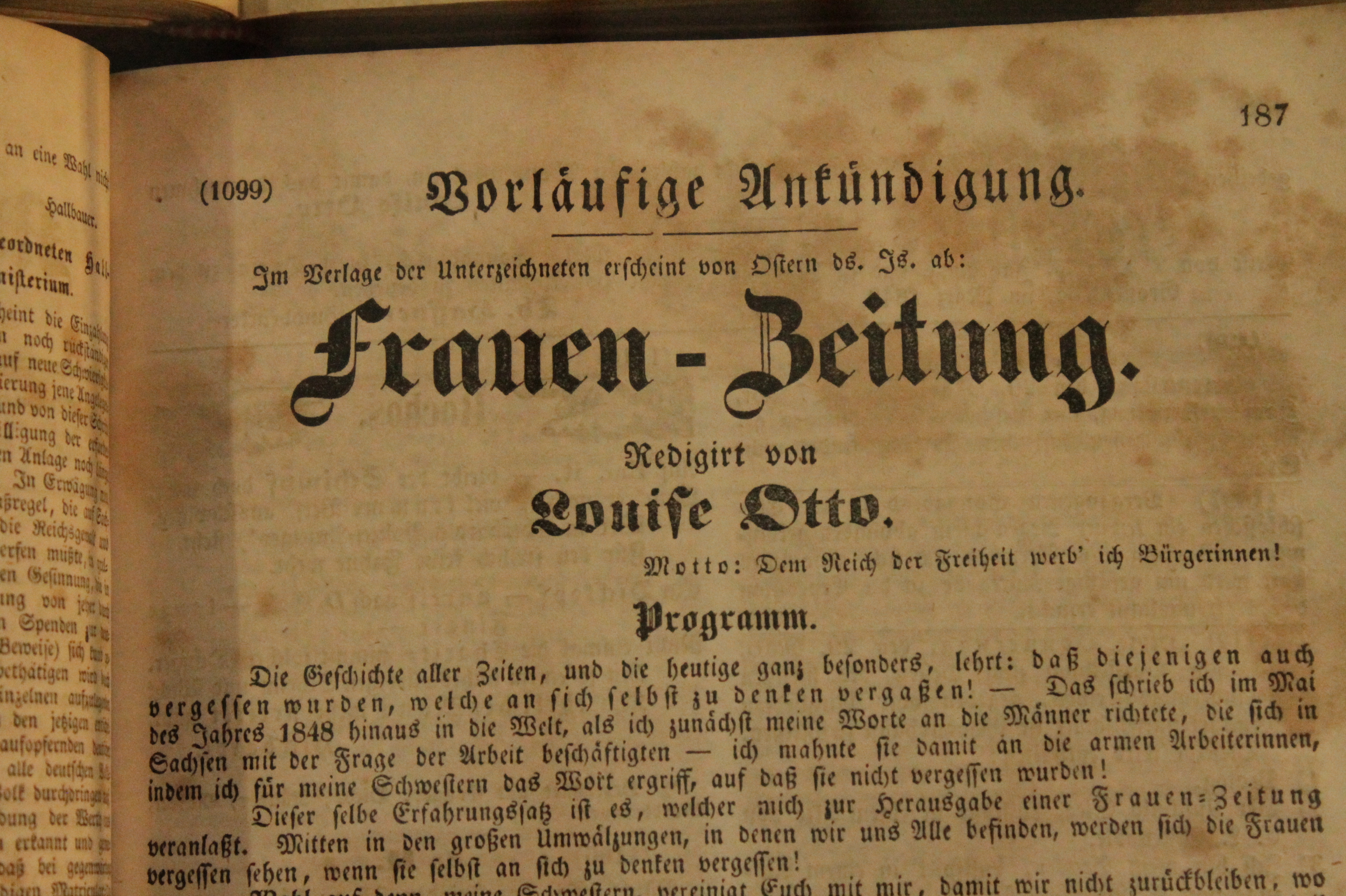
Frontispiece of Frauen Zeitung 1849, Meissen Stadt Museum

Louise Otto was born in Meissen, the daughter of Charlotte and Wilhelm Otto, a successful lawyer. She was educated by private tutors. In 1835, when she was 16, both her parents and an older sister died. Otto-Peters thereafter lived with her two older sisters. At this point, she began writing novels, short stories, poetry, and political articles to make a living. She additionally worked as a journalist from 1843 "with articles about her concept of femininity, as well as women and politics".

Otto-Peters became friends with Robert Blum and other democrats, and this connection permitted her to contribute to their newspapers, specifically, Der Wandelstern [The Wandering Star] and Sächsische Vaterlandsblätter [Saxon Fatherland Pages]. By the autumn of 1843 Otto-Peters had become a regular staff member for these two publications, occasionally writing under the pseudonym of Otto Stern. After the democratic revolution of 1848, Otto-Peters founded Frauen-Zeitung, the first political women's newspaper in Germany. Her newspaper brought forth a new law to be implemented which explicitly forbade women to be editors of newspapers in Saxony. Her newspaper moved from Leipzig to Gera (beyond the borders of Saxony) and under this condition was able to continue publishing until 1853.

Louise Otto became engaged to August Peters in 1849, but he was soon thereafter imprisoned for his rebellious stance against the government. They eventually married in 1858, but in 1864 August Peters died from heart disease.

Louise founded the women's journal Neue Bahnen in 1855. In 1865, Louise Otto-Peters, Minna Cauer, and other women suffragists founded the Allgemeiner Deutscher Frauenverein [General German Women's Association] and participated in the first women's conference in Leipzig. She was the primary editor of Neue Bahnen until her death in 1895.

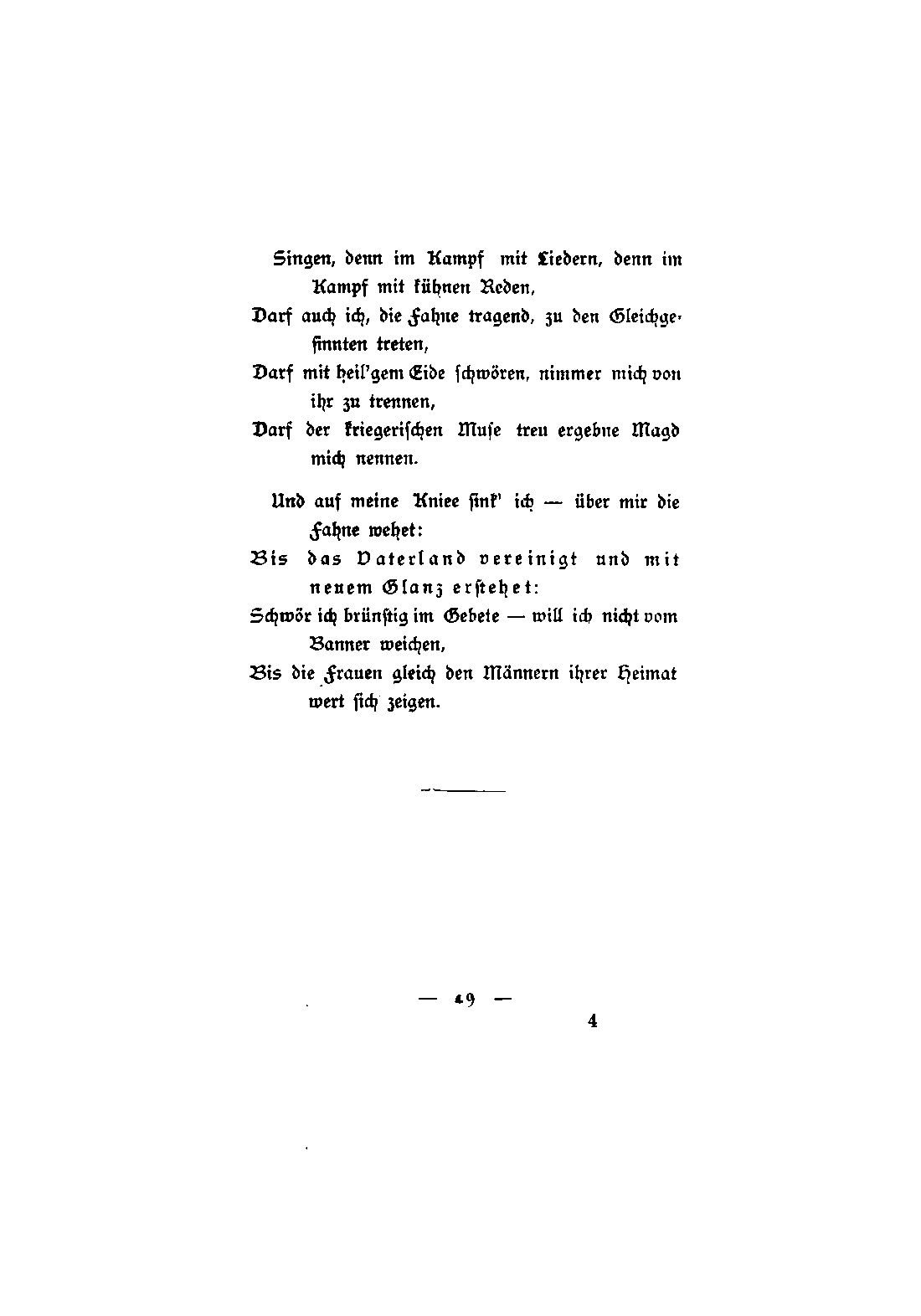
Mein Lebensgang, poem of 1893

She is buried in the Neuen Johannisfriedhof in Leipzig.

== Literary and historical significance ==
She was called by peers the "songbird of the German women's movement". Her first socio-political novel was Ludwig the Waiter (1843), followed by Castle and Factory (1846–1847), initially confiscated but brought attention to her works. Otto-Peters called on the public for better working conditions for poor women.

According to Ann T. Allen:

Otto-Peters understood emancipation as the validation of qualities that she considered distinctly female, including compassion and human concern, rather than as imitation of men. She stressed the importance of these qualities to the public as well as the private sphere, arguing that well-paying jobs for women would advance the welfare of individual women in society as a whole.

== Recognition ==
The 1958 East German film Nur eine Frau (Only one Woman) is based on her life.

== Published works ==
Louise Otto-Peters's published works as cited by An Encyclopedia of Continental Women Writers:

Novels:

- Ludwig der Kellner, 2 volumes, 1843.
- Kathinka, 2 volumes, 1844.
- Die Freunde, 3 volumes, 1845.
- Schloß und Fabrik, 4 volumes, 1846–1847.
- Römisch und deutsch, 4 volumes, 1847.
- Buchenheim, 3 volumes, 1851.
- Jesuiten und Pietisten oder Cäcilie Telville, 3 volumes, 1852.
- Zwei Generationen, 3 volumes, 1852.
- Nürnberg, 3 volumes, 1858.
- Die Schultheientochter von Nürnberg, 3 volumes, 1861.
- Neue Bahnen, 2 volumes, 1864.
- Die Idealisten, 4 volumes, 1867.
- Die Stiftsherren von Straburg, 2 volumes, 1872.
- Die Nachtigall von Werawag, 4 volumes, 1887.

Novellas and short stories:

- Aus der neuen Zeit, 1845.
- Aus der alten Zeit, 2 volumes, 1860.
- Kunst und Künstlerleben, 1863.
- Mädchenbilder aus der Gegenwart, 1864.
- Musikerleiden und- freuden, 1871.
- Zwischen den Bergen, 2 volumes, 1873.
- Aus vier Jahrhunderten, 2 volumes, 1883.

Poems:

- Lieder eines deutschen Mädchens, 1848.
- Westwärts, 1849.
- Gedichte, 1868.
- Mein Lebensgang, 1893.

Other:

- Adresse eines deutschen Mädchens, 1848.
- Die Kunst und unsere Zeit, 1852.
- Das Recht der Frauen auf Erwerb, 1866.
- Privatgeschichten der Weltgeschichte, 6 volumes, 1868–1872.
- Frauenleben im Deutschen Reich, 1876.
- Das erste Vierteljahrhundert des Allgemeinen Deutschen Frauenvereins, 1890.

Opera libretti:

- Die Nibelungen, 1852.
- Theodor Körner, 1867.

Editor or co-editor of journals:

- Deutsche Frauenzeitung
- Mitteldeutsche Volkszeitung
- Neue Bahnen
- Vaterlandsblätter (contributor under the pseudonym Otto Stern)

== See also ==
- Luise Aston
