= Lyre and Sword =

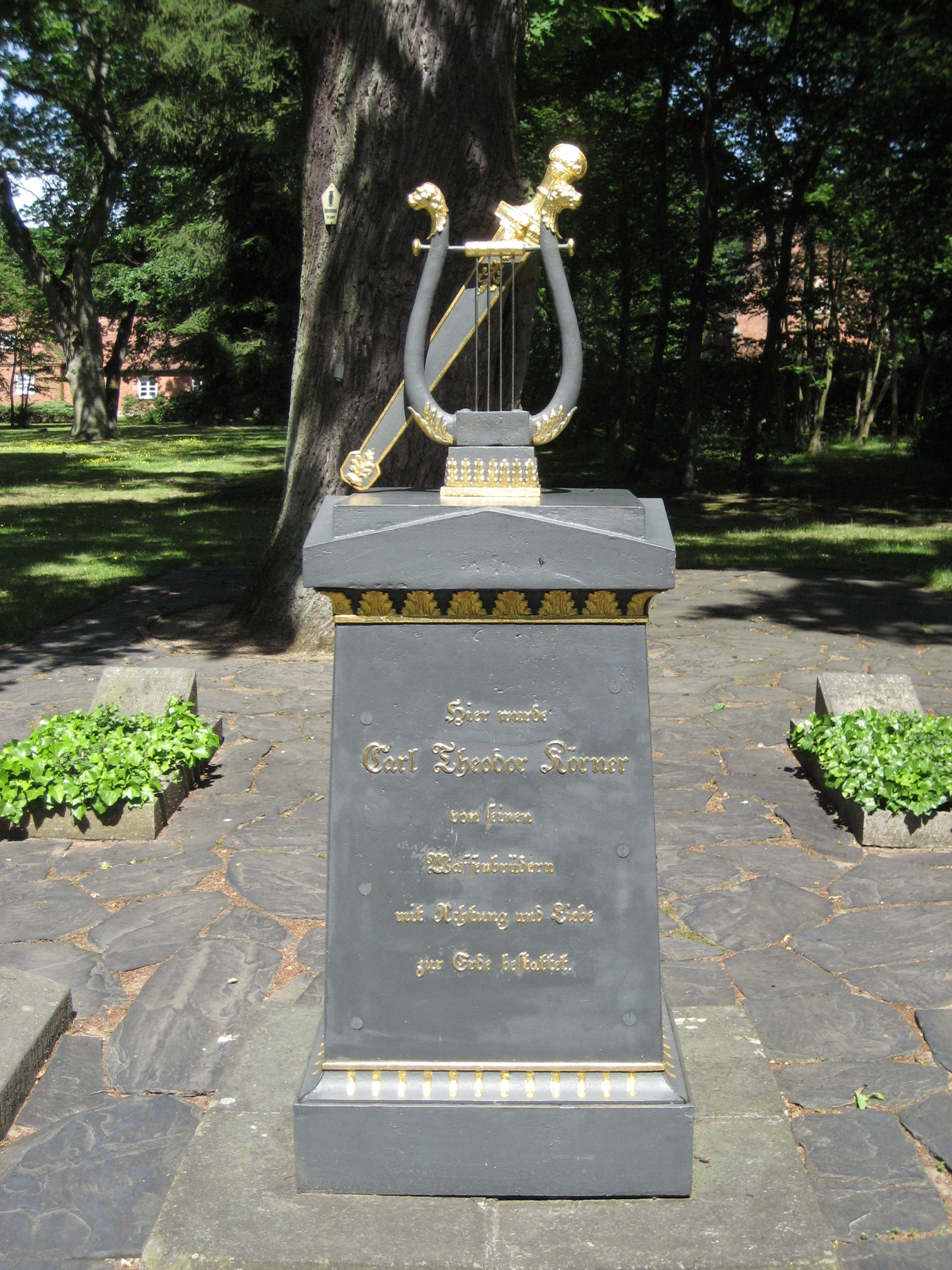
The monument with lyre and sword on the grave of Theodor Körner and his family in Wöbbelin.

Lyre and Sword (Ger., Leyer und Schwerdt; modern spelling, Leier und Schwert) is a collection of patriotic poetry by Theodor Körner (1791–1813), which first appeared posthumously in 1814, consisting mostly of poems from the last year of his life. The poet had taken part in the German War of Liberation as a lieutenant in the Lützow Free Corps and fell on August 26, 1813 near Gadebusch. The poems, some of them based on German folk-tunes, (Note: For example, the "Lied der schwarzen Jäger" ('Song of the Black Huntsmen'), set to the tune of "Am Rhein, am Rhein, da wachsen uns're Reben" ('On th'Rhine, on th'Rhine, our grapes, they are a-growing'), possibly by Johann André.) were originally sung to the guitar or recited by the poet to his fellow soldiers.

The influence of the first volume (Vienna 1814) published by the poet's father, Christian Gottfried Körner, was increased by numerous new editions, as well as by musical settings of various individual poems such as "Lützow's Wild Chase", the "Cavalry Song", and the "Sword Song". Carl Maria von Weber used the title Lyre and Sword for a collection of four-part settings for men's chorus of several of the poems, Op. 42. Other poems such as "My Fatherland", the "Hunters' Song", and "Prayer During the Battle" were set by such composers as Franz Schubert.

== Quotation ==
Denn was berauscht die Leyer vorgesungen,
Das hat des Schwertes freie That errungen.

— from the "Dedication" (Note: Cited according to the 1814 Viennese edition S. 4. Cf. the text of the Berlin edition Berlin 1814: "Denn was berauſcht, die Leyer vorgeſungen, / Das hat des Schwerdtes freie That errungen." ('For what, when ſtirring, erſt the lyre hath gleed / The free act of the ſword hath won indeed.'))
Translation:

For what the stirring lyre erst hath gleed
The free act of the sword hath won indeed.
