= 1813 in poetry =

Nationality words link to articles with information on the nation's poetry or literature (for instance, Irish or France).

== Events ==
- April 20 - Lord Byron and Thomas Moore visit Leigh Hunt in the Surrey Gaol.
- April 23 - Byron takes Hunt some books to help with his composition of Francesca da Rimini.
- June 17–18 - German poet Theodor Körner, fighting with the Königlich Preußisches Freikorps von Lützow in the German campaign against Napoleon (War of the Sixth Coalition), composes the sonnet Abschied vom Leben ("Farewell to Life") while lying severely wounded.
- August 25 - Theodor Körner composes the patriotic lyric Schwertlied ("Sword Song") the night before his death in action at age 21.
- Autumn - Robert Southey becomes Poet Laureate of the United Kingdom after Walter Scott's refusal of the post.
- First award of the Chancellor's Gold Medal for poetry at the University of Cambridge in England, to George Waddington for "Columbus".
- Kālidāsa's 4th/5th century Sanskrit poem Meghadūta is first translated into English by Horace Hayman Wilson.

== Works published ==
=== United Kingdom ===
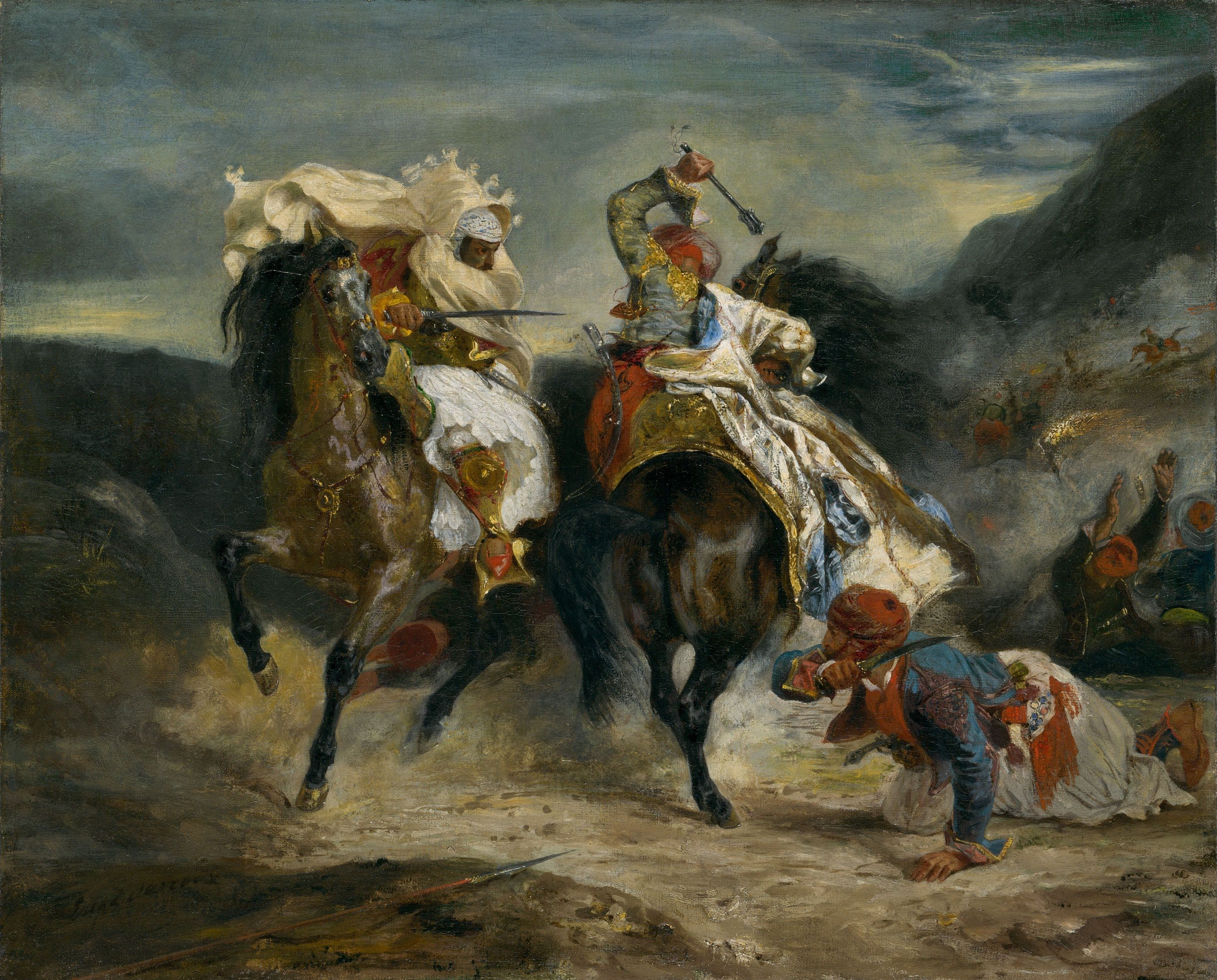
The Combat of the Giaour and Hassan scene from Byron's The Giaour painted by Eugène Delacroix (1826)

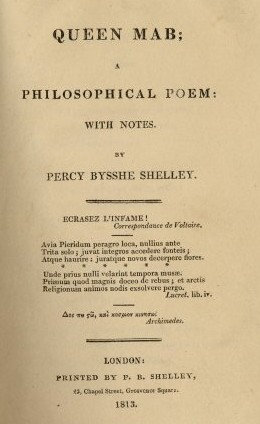
Title page of the limited first edition of Shelley's Queen Mab, published this year

- William Lisle Bowles, The Missionary, published anonymously
- Lord Byron:
  - The Bride of Abydos: A Turkish tale published in early December and within the month sells 6,000 copies, making Byron sought after in the London literary scene as he receives invitations daily
  - The Giaour: A fragment of a Turkish tale
  - The Waltz: An Apostrophic Hymn, published under the pen name "Horace Hornem Esq."
- Allan Cunningham, Songs
- Thomas John Dibdin, A Metrical History of England
- James Hogg, The Queen's Wake
- Mary Russell Mitford, Narrative Poems on the Female Character
- James Montgomery, The World Before the Flood
- Thomas Moore, writing as "Thomas Brown, the younger", Intercepted Letters; or, The Twopenny Post-Bag, several editions this year
- Sir Walter Scott:
  - Rokeby, five editions this year; inspired Jokeby, an anonymous parody by John Roby, also published this year
  - The Bridal of Triermain; or, The Vale of St. John
- Percy Bysshe Shelley, Queen Mab
- Horatio Smith and James Smith, Horace in London, mostly by James Smith

=== United States ===
- Washington Allston, The Sylphs of the Seasons, with Other Poems, "First American from the London edition" Boston; Cambridge: Published by Cummings and Hilliard; Hilliard & Metcalf, American living in and published in the United Kingdom; sentimental and satirical poems; written while the author was a student at Harvard and published during his convalescence; the book was praised by William Wordsworth and Robert Southey
- Edwin Clifford Holland, Odes, Naval Songs, and Other Occasional Poems
- William Kilty, attributed, The Vision of Don Croker
- James Kirke Paulding, The Lay of the Scottish Fiddle: A Tale of Havre de Grace, Supposed to Be Written by Walter Scott, Esq., a long poem and verse parody of the romantic poetry of Sir Walter Scott, particularly Scott's Lay of the Last Minstrel; Paulding's work condemns the British invasion of Chesapeake Bay in the War of 1812 and is strongly criticized in the London Quarterly
- George Watterston, The Scenes of Youth

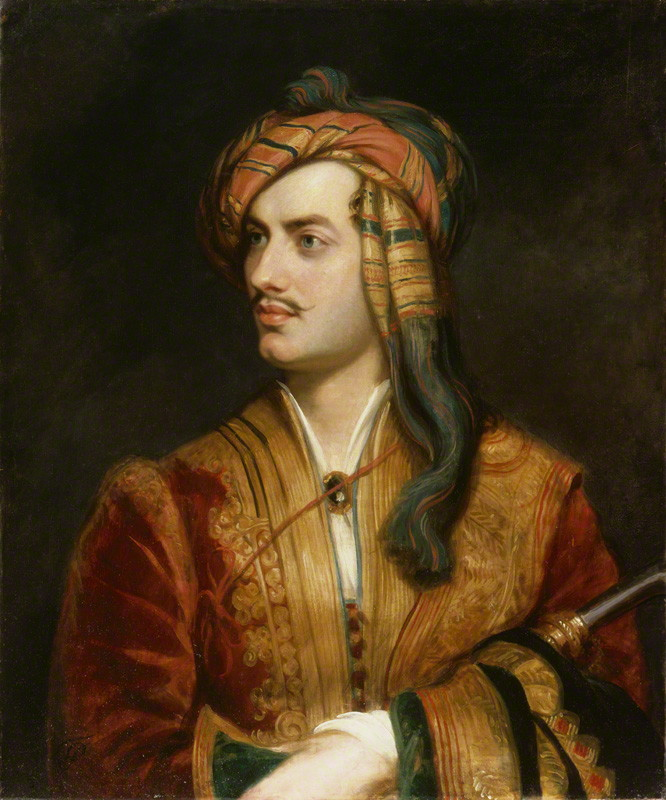
Lord Byron in Albanian Dress, by Thomas Phillips, painted this year

=== Other ===
- Cristóbal de Beña, Spanish poet published in the United Kingdom:
  - Fábulas políticas ("Political Fables")
  - La lira de la libertad ("Liberty's Lyre"), London: M'Dowall

== Births ==
Death years link to the corresponding "[year] in poetry" article:

- January 23 – Charles Harpur (died 1868), Australian
- February 26 – Adrien Rouquette (died 1887), American poet and missionary
- March 8 – Christopher Pearse Cranch (died 1892), American writer and artist
- March 18 – Christian Friedrich Hebbel (died 1863), German poet and dramatist
- June 20 – Charles Timothy Brooks (died 1883), American translator, poet, Transcendentalist and Unitarian pastor
- June 21 – William Edmondstoune Aytoun (died 1865), Scottish
- August 28 – Jones Very (died 1880), American poet, essayist, Transcendentalist and clergyman
- September 27 – Epes Sargent (died 1880), American editor, poet and playwright
- October 17 – Georg Büchner (died 1837), German dramatist, poet and writer
- November 13 (November 1 O.S.) – Petar II Petrović-Njegoš (died 1851), Serbian poet and Prince-Bishop of Montenegro

== Deaths ==
Birth years link to the corresponding "[year] in poetry" article:

- January 20 - Christoph Martin Wieland (born 1733), German poet, translator and editor
- June 26 - Jean-François Cailhava de L'Estandoux (born 1731), French dramatist, poet and critic
- August 11 - Henry James Pye (born 1745), English Poet Laureate
- Autumn - Henrietta Battier (born c. 1751), Irish poet, satirist and actress

== See also ==
- Poetry
- List of years in poetry
- List of years in literature
- 19th century in literature
- 19th century in poetry
- Romantic poetry
- Golden Age of Russian Poetry (1800–1850)
- Weimar Classicism period in Germany, commonly considered to have begun in 1788 and to have ended either in 1805, with the death of Friedrich Schiller, or 1832, with the death of Goethe
- List of poets
