= Emma Körner =

German painter (1788–1815)

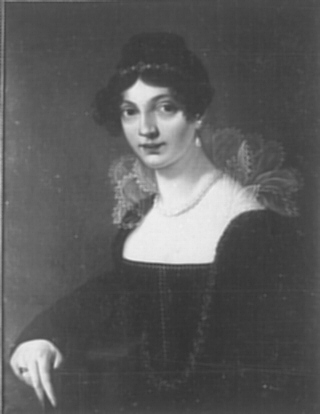
- Self portrait, 1813. Formerly in the Körner-Museum, Dresden. Destroyed, 1945.
- Born: Emma Sophie Körner; 20 April 1788; Dresden, Electorate of Saxony
- Died: 15 March 1815 (aged 26); Dresden, Kingdom of Saxony
- Education: Pupil of Anton Graff
- Known for: Painting

Emma Sophie Körner (born 20 April 1788) was a German painter, a pupil of the Swiss painter Anton Graff, and sister of the poet and soldier Carl Theodor Körner.

== Biography ==
Emma Körner was born in 1788, the daughter of Christian Gottfried Körner, a Judge of the Court of Appeals (Oberappellationsgerichtsrats), and of Minna Stock, the daughter of the engraver Johann Michael Stock; her mother’s sister was the painter Dora Stock. Together with her brother Theodor, Emma was raised in a home with a lively social, artistic, and intellectual life. Her father was a supporter and promoter of the poet Friedrich Schiller, who even lived for some time with the family. Other distinguished personalities, such as Goethe and Heinrich von Kleist, were also often guests.

Emma’s aunt Dora, who had lived in her sister’s house since August 1785, encouraged Emma’s artistic talent, as well as painting her portrait. Dora Stock’s friend Anton Graff, who had already done portraits of her father and mother, later also executed a portrait in oils of Emma, and gave her instruction in art as well.

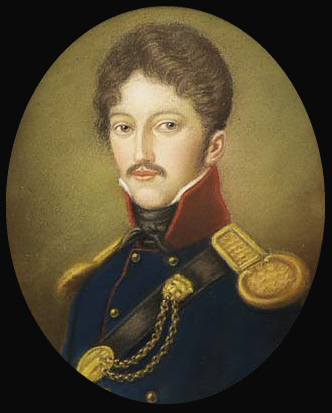
Theodor Körner (Pastel Miniature by Emma Körner, 1813)

In her brief artistic career, Emma Körner painted a portrait of Schiller in his final years, as well as numerous portraits of her brother Theodor, toward whom she displayed an intimate sisterly devotion. Because Theodor had volunteered as a member of the Lützow Free Corps in the Befreiungskrieg against Napoleon in 1813, the Körners were avoided by many, both socially and politically, during the period of the Saxon king’s alliance with the French. Theodor Körner fell in battle at Gadebusch, Mecklenburg in August 1813; two years later, Emma visited his grave in Wöbbelin with her parents. Seized with grief, Emma wanted the grave opened, but her father refused, fearing the effects on her of an overwhelming flood of emotion. Four weeks after this visit, Emma was struck down in Dresden by a virulent nervous fever. She was buried next to her brother under an oak-tree in Wöbbelin.

For political reasons her parents, now bereft of children, abandoned Dresden with her aunt, and departed for Berlin, where her father joined the Prussian state service.

== Exhibitions ==
Until it was destroyed in the bombing of Dresden in World War II, the “Körner-Museum” in their old family home displayed paintings and compositions by the Körners and by Dora Stock. A remnant of these is now exhibited in the nearby “Dresden Museum of Romanticism,” in the former house of the painter Gerhard von Kügelgen.

== Bibliography ==
- Weber, Albrecht (Ed.): Briefe der Familie Körner (1804–1815) (“Letters of the Körner Family (1804–1815)”). In: Deutsche Rundschau. 4 (1878), Issue 10 (July), pp. 115–136. (in German)
