= Schwertlied =

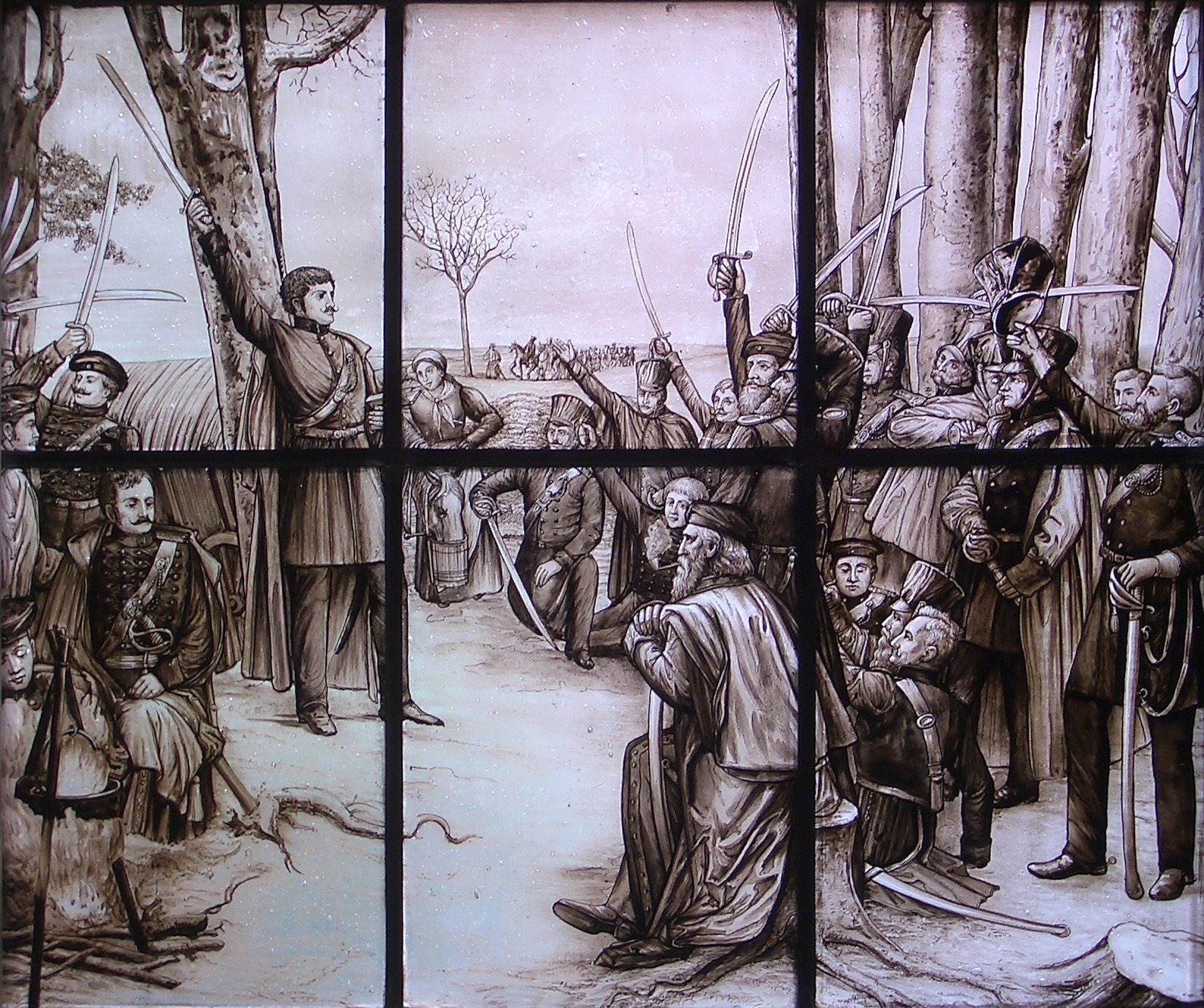
Theodor Körner reciting his war songs to his comrades shortly before the start of the battle where he found his death (glass window after a painting by Rudolf Eichstaedt)

"Schwertlied" ("Sword Song") is a poem by Theodor Körner, written shortly before his death in battle on 26 August 1813.

== Historic context ==
Theodor Körner was a famous poet during his lifetime, and was appointed poet to the court at the Vienna Burgtheater. He nonetheless gave up his civilian life and joined the Lützow Free Corps, a Prussian military unit composed of volunteers from all over Germany.

As a soldier, Körner wrote several patriotic poems, like "Lützows wilde, verwegene Jagd" and the "Schwertlied". Several hours after having written the "Schwertlied" Körner fell in battle near Gadebusch (Mecklenburg), and consequently became a national hero in Germany.

== Content ==
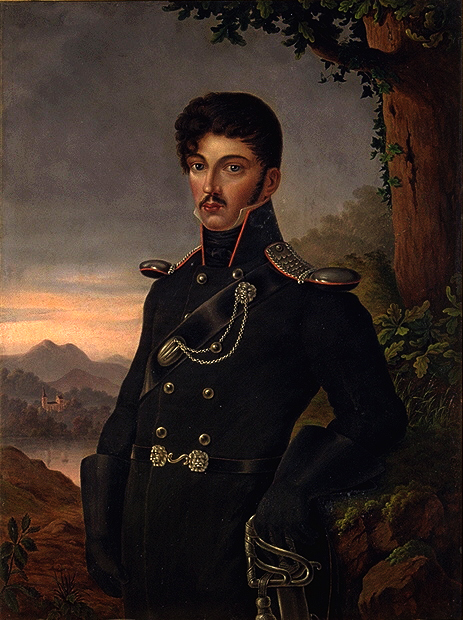
Körner in a posthumous portrait in Lützow uniform by his aunt Dora Stock (1814)

"Schwertlied" functions as paean of warrior spirit. Therein, Körner describes the relationship between a soldier and his sword as if the weapon were his bride thirsting for blood. In the end, he draws the sword, as battle awaits him, thus making the marriage legal before God ("At last / Hath truly God allied / The right hand to the bride.").

Schwerdtlied.
Wenig Stunden vor dem Tode des Verfassers am 26. Aug. 1813 gedichtet.

Du Schwerdt an meiner Linken,
Was soll dein heitres Blinken?
Schaust mich so freundlich an,
Hab' meine Freude dran.
Hurrah! *)

„Mich trägt ein wackrer Reiter,
Drum blink ich auch so heiter,
Bin freien Mannes Wehr,
Das freut dem Schwerdte sehr.“
Hurrah!

Ja gutes Schwerdt frei bin ich,
Und liebe dich herzinnig,
Als wärst du mir getraut,
Als eine liebe Braut.
Hurrah!

„Dir hab' ich's ja ergeben,
Mein lichtes Eisenleben,
Ach, wären wir getraut!
Wann hohlst du deine Braut?“
Hurrah!

Zur Brautnachts Morgenröthe,
Ruft festlich die Trompete,
Wenn die Kanonen schrei'n,
Hohl ich das Liebchen ein.
Hurrah!

„O seeliges Umfangen!
Ich harre mit Verlangen.
Du Bräut'gam hohle mich,
Mein Kränzchen bleibt für dich,“
Hurrah!

Was klirrst du in der Scheide,
Du helle Eisenfreude,
So wild, so schlachtenfroh?
Mein Schwerdt, was klingst du so?
Hurrah!

„Wohl klirr ich in der Scheide,
Ich sehne mich zum Streite,
Recht wild und schlachtenfroh.
Drum Reiter klirr ich so.“
Hurrah!

Bleib doch im engen Stübchen.
Was willst du hier, mein Liebchen?
Bleib still im Kämmerlein,
Bleib, bald hohl' ich dich ein.
Hurrah!

„Laß mich nicht lange warten!
O schöner Liebesgarten,
Voll Röslein blutigroth.
Und aufgeblühtem Tod.“
Hurrah!

So komm denn aus der Scheide,
Du Reiters Augenweide,
Heraus, mein Schwerdt, heraus!
Führ' dich ins Vaterhaus.
Hurrah!

„Ach, herrlich ists im Freien,
Im rüst'gen Hochzeitreihen.
Wie glänzt im Sonnenstrahl
So bräutlich hell der Stahl!“
Hurrah!

Wohlauf, ihr kecken Streiter,
Wohlauf, ihr deutschen Reiter!
Wird euch das Herz nicht warm,
Nehmt's Liebchen in den Arm.
Hurrah!

Erst that es an der Linken,
Nur ganz verstohlen blinken,
Doch an die Rechte traut,
Gott sichtbarlich die Braut.
Hurrah!

Drum drückt den liebeheißen,
Bräutlichen Mund von Eisen,
An eure Lippen fest.
Fluch! wer die Braut verläßt.
Hurrah!

Nun laßt das Liebchen singen,
Daß helle Funken springen,
Der Hochzeitsmorgen graut –
Hurrah, du Eisenbraut!
Hurrah!

- ) Bei dem Hurrah! wird mit den Schwerdtern geklirrt.

Translation:

Sword Song.

Thou sword at my left side,
What means thy flash of pride?
Thou smilest so on me,
I take delight in thee.
Hurrah!

"I grace a warrior's side,
And hence my flash of pride;
What rapture thus to be
The guardian of the free!"
Hurrah!

Good sword, yes, I am free,
And fondly I love thee,
As wert thou, at my side,
My sweet affianced bride.
Hurrah!

"To thee did I not plight
My iron troth so light?
O were the knot but tied!
When wilt thou fetch thy bride?"
Hurrah!

The clanging trumpets betray
The blushing bridal day;
When cannons far and wide
Shall roar, I'll fetch my bride.
Hurrah!

"O blissful hour! I sigh
In thy embrace to lie.
Come, bridegroom, keep thy vow,
My wreath shall deck thy brow."
Hurrah!

Why in thy sheath dost clash,
As wouldst thou brightly flash
In battle, wild and proud?
Why clashest thou so loud?
Hurrah!

"Yes in my sheath I clash;
I long to gleam and flash
In battle, wild and proud.
'Tis why I clash so loud."
Hurrah!

Stay in thy narrow cell,
What wilt thou here? O tell!
In thy small chamber bide,
Soon will I fetch my bride.
Hurrah!

"O do not long delay!
To love's fair fields away,
Where blood-red roses blow,
And death blooms round us so!"
Hurrah!

Then quit thy sheath that I
On thee may feast mine eye.
Come forth, my sword, and view
The Father's mansion blue!
Hurrah!

"O lovely blue expanse!
Where golden sunbeams dance,
How in the nuptial reel
Will gleam the bridal steel!"
Hurrah!

Up, warriors! awake,
Ye German brave! O take,
Should not your hearts be warm,
Your bride into your arm.
Hurrah!

At first she did but cast
A stolen glance; at last
Hath truly God allied
The right hand to the bride.
Hurrah!

Then press with fervent zeal
The bridal lips of steel
To thine; and woe betide
Him who deserts his bride!
Hurrah!

Now let her sing and clash,
That glowing sparks may flash!
Morn wakes in nuptial pride.
Hurrah, thou iron bride!
Hurrah!

== Settings ==
The poem was set to music by Carl Maria von Weber in 1814 (op. 42 Nr. 6, J. 169).

Franz Schubert set the poem as a part-song (or cantata) for voice, unison choir and piano, on 12 March 1815 (D 170). It was first published in 1873, and in the 1894 edition of Series XX, Volume 2 of Franz Schubert's Works it was published as No. 54.

== See also ==
- Theodor Körner (opera)
- Lützows wilde, verwegene Jagd
