= George Fleming Richardson =

English geologist

- Born: 1796?
- Died: 1848; Somers Town, London
- Occupation: Geologist

George Fleming Richardson (c. 1796 – 1848) was an English geologist.

== Biography ==
Richardson was born about 1796. He acted at one time as curator to the collection of Dr. Gideon Algernon Mantell, when it was on exhibition at Brighton in 1837. He also took notes of a series of Mantell's lectures, which were published as "The Wonders of Geology" (1838).

In 1838, when Mantell's collection was bought by the trustees of the British Museum, Richardson entered their service as assistant in the "department of minerals." This post he filled for ten years. During the same period he lectured on geology and kindred subjects, and was elected a fellow of the Geological Society on 22 May 1839. In 1848 pecuniary embarrassments led him into the bankruptcy court, and he committed suicide in Somers Town on 5 July 1848. His geological handbooks were useful compilations; he was less successful in his efforts in general literature.

Richardson was author of:

- "Poetic Hours," &c., 12mo, London, 1825.
- "Rosalie Berton," in "Tales of all Nations," 12mo, London, 1827.
- "Sketches in Prose and Verse," 8vo, London, 1835; 2nd ser. 8vo, London, 1838.
- "Geology for Beginners," &c., 12mo, London, 1842; 2nd ed. 1843; reissued 1851.
- "Geology, Mineralogy," &c., revised by Wright, 8vo, London, 1858.

"An Essay on the German Language and Literature," by Richardson, is advertised in "A Descriptive Catalogue of the Objects … in the Museum attached to the Sussex Scientific and Literary Institute, 1836," which last he possibly also wrote. He also translated "The Life of C. T. Körner," 8vo, London, 1827; 2nd edit. 1845; and at his death he had completed a translation of Friedrich Bouterwek's ‘History of German Literature.’
