= Dora Stock =

German artist (1759–1832)

Dora Stock, self-portrait, in the Kügelgenhaus, Dresden

Dora (shortened from Doris or Dorothea) Stock (6 March 1759 – 30 May 1832) was a German artist of the 18th and 19th centuries who specialized in portraiture. She was at the center of a highly cultivated household in which a great number of artists, musicians, and writers were guests; and her friends and acquaintances included some of the most eminent figures of her day, such as Goethe, Schiller and Mozart.

== Life ==
=== Childhood ===
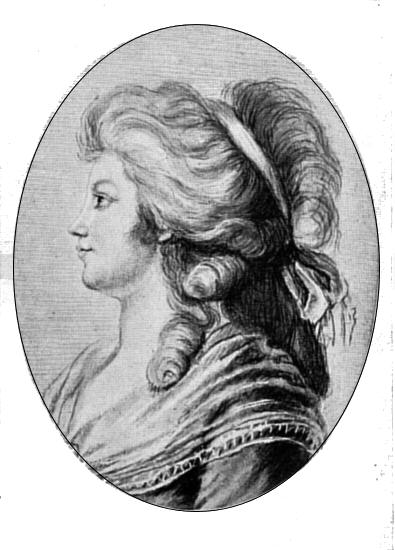
Minna Körner, as portrayed by her sister Dora. In the Körnermuseum in Dresden.

She was born in Nuremberg to a copper engraver named Johann Michael Stock (1737–1773). Stock had in 1756 married a widow five years his senior—Maria Helen Endner, née Schwabe (1733–1782)—who already had a son, Georg Gustav, by her previous marriage. Dora was the first of two surviving children born to this marriage; two years later her younger sister Anna Maria Jakobina, called Minna (11 March 1762 – 1843), was born.

When Dora was five years old, her father took up a position in Leipzig working as an engraver and illustrator for the Breitkopf printing and publishing firm, and his family followed him to Leipzig a few months later. The Stock family was not well off. They lived in fifth-floor attic rooms in a building whose lower floors were occupied by Breitkopf printing facilities. The father worked in the front room, where there was ample window lighting, surrounded by his family.

As was common for children at the time (especially girls) Dora did not go to school; however, a local minister taught her basic skills of reading and arithmetic, and her mother taught her music; there was a modest piano in their home. The wealthy Breitkopf family also frequently invited her into their home, where she played with children receiving more substantial educations.

=== Goethe ===
Starting when Dora was six, her home was very frequently visited by Johann Wolfgang von Goethe, who would eventually become the preeminent figure of German literature, but at the time was a 16-year-old studying jurisprudence at the university. Goethe had signed up with Dora's father for lessons in drawing and engraving.

The young Goethe taught Dora about the theater and led household performances in which Dora took parts. On the whole, however, his presence in the Stock household was disruptive and upsetting. In one typical episode, at Christmas time Goethe induced the family dog to eat the candy Christ-child. Goethe also required Dora and Minna to serve as lookouts whenever he entertained female company, and (to the family's concern) he took the father out drinking in Auerbachs Keller, a scene later immortalized in Faust.

Goethe met the adult Dora and Minna a number of times in later years and remained on friendly terms with them. She never painted his portrait, however.

=== Training ===
The teenage Goethe had offered advice to Dora's father about how to raise his daughters: "[train them] in nothing but the art of housekeeping, let them be good cooks, that will be best for their future husbands." Her father however had no such intentions, and Dora assiduously learned the arts of drawing and engraving at his workbench; she was evidently his star pupil. Later Dora studied with Adam Friedrich Oeser and (perhaps) Anton Graff, both painters. After the death of her father in 1773, Dora was able to help keep the family afloat, along with her older half-brother, by continuing the family's business relationship with Breitkopf.

=== Love life ===
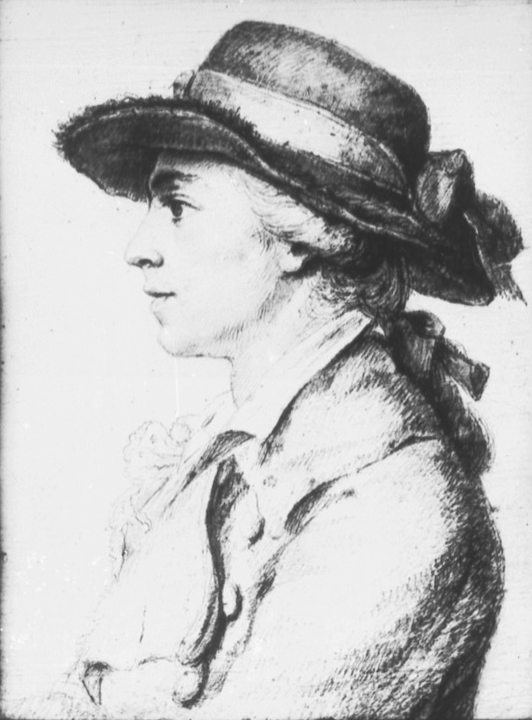
Drawing in silverpoint of Ludwig Huber from 1788 by Dora Stock

In the late teenage years, she had two suitors, both of whom she turned down. In 1780, at age 20, became engaged to a 16-year-old, the future writer Ludwig Ferdinand Huber. Since Huber had no means of supporting a family, the engagement was a very long one. In 1788, Huber left for a diplomatic position in Mainz; however, rather than making the marriage possible, it led to its cancellation: Huber embarked on a relationship with Therese Forster, the abandoned wife of Georg Forster, which Dora found out about only in 1792. Following this event, which Siegel characterizes as devastating, Dora made no further plans to marry and remained single for the rest of her life.

=== Stock and the Körners ===
Throughout her life Dora was very close to her younger sister Minna. Minna was engaged to Christian Gottfried Körner shortly after he finished his university degree. Minna and Körner were unable to marry due to the strenuous objections of Körner's well-off father, who could not bear the thought of his son Gottfried marrying a "shop-keeper's girl".

In 1785 Körner's father died, leaving his son a substantial inheritance. This made it possible for Gottfried and Minna to marry. They did so on 7 August, and moved to Dresden, where Körner had earlier taken up a junior legal position (he eventually rose to a senior rank, consistorial councillor). Following their honeymoon, Dora moved in with them, occupying a small bedroom and setting up her painting apparatus in the common living area.

Gottfried, Minna, and Dora soon had made their home into an important cultural center. Robert Riggs writes:

The Körner household in Dresden ... became a literary and musical salon. Plays and essays were read; Singspiele and chamber music were performed; and lectures on art were given. Guests and participants included Johann Gottfried von Herder, Goethe, Wilhelm von Humboldt, the Schlegel brothers, Ludwig Tieck, Novalis, and the musicians Johann Naumann, Johann Hiller, Karl Zelter, Mozart, and Weber.

The Körners had two children who survived past infancy. Both had short but high-achieving lives: Emma Körner (1788–1815), who became a skilled painter, and Theodor Körner (1791–1813), who became a renowned soldier-poet. Dora helped raise and educate both children, and painted portraits of them.

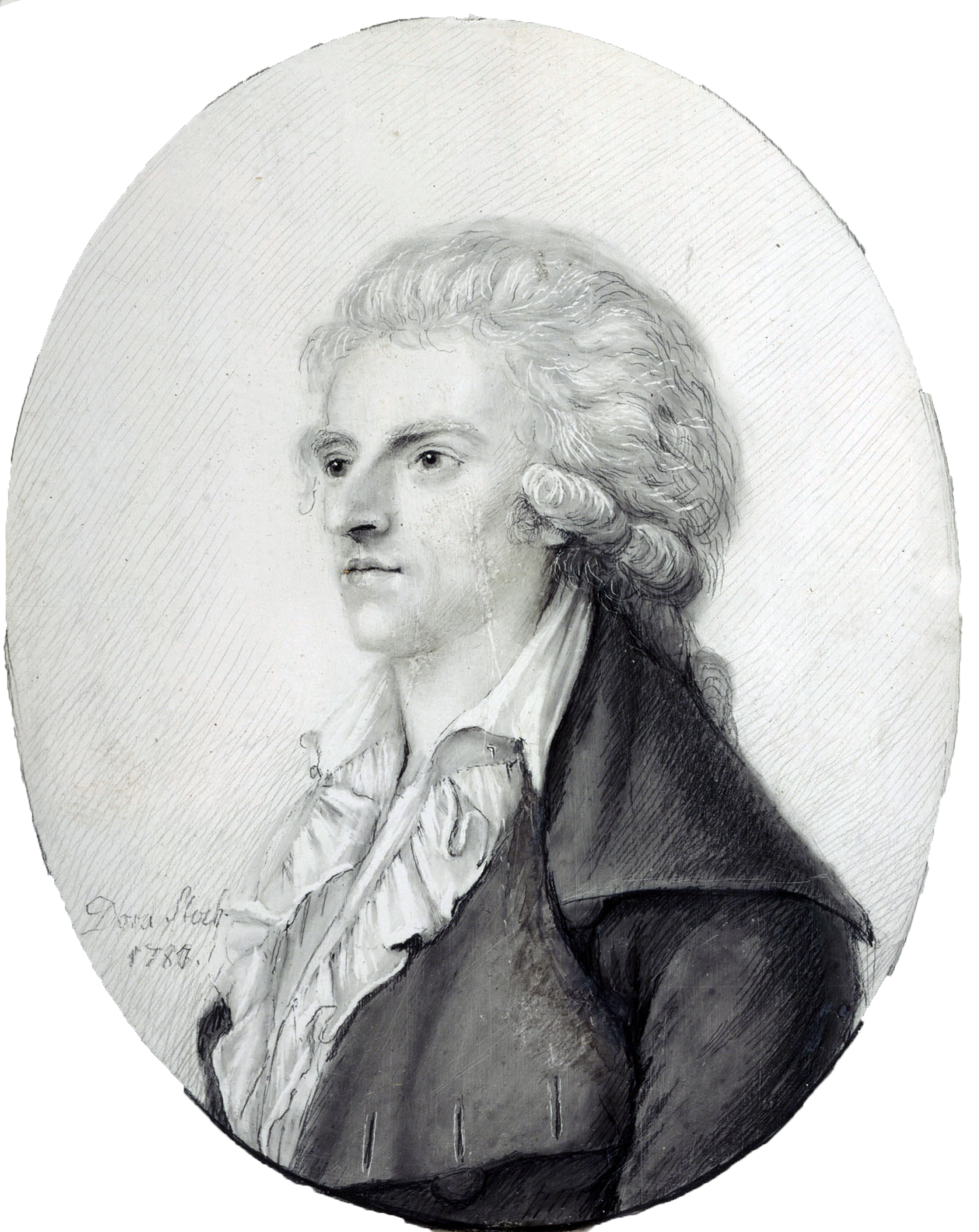
Stock's portrait of Friedrich Schiller from 1787

=== Relationship with Schiller ===
Starting in 1784 Dora, Huber, Minna, and Körner together befriended the poet Friedrich Schiller. The friendship began with an idea of Dora's, sending an anonymous package of token gifts (Dora's contribution was a miniature portrait of each of the four). This gesture greatly heartened Schiller, boosting his spirits at a difficult early phase of his career. In 1785 he visited the group and vacationed with them in Loschwitz, a rural village outside Dresden, eventually living for two years in the Körner household and remaining a lifelong friend. Dora produced three Schiller portraits.

In the Körner home Gottfried had built a small theater for family theatrical productions, which according to Siegel were good enough to attract professional theater people to the audience. Since Schiller was a close friend, this theater served as the venue for the (private) premieres of a number of his yet-unpublished plays; Siegel notes that Theodor Körner was the first to play the part of William Tell, and Stock herself was the first Joan of Arc (in The Maid of Orleans). Stock also served as "director, stage manager, and the children's coach."

=== Artistic life ===
Dora Stock's art consisted almost entirely of portraits. Stock's biographer Linda Siegel describes and assesses these paintings in detail; in outline, she judges them as deeply thoughtful works, notable for their honesty and realism and not always flattering to their subjects. An anonymous reviewer of Siegel's book says of Stock that she "recoiled from vanity or exaggeration, values that are evident in her extremely competent and brutally honest portraits."

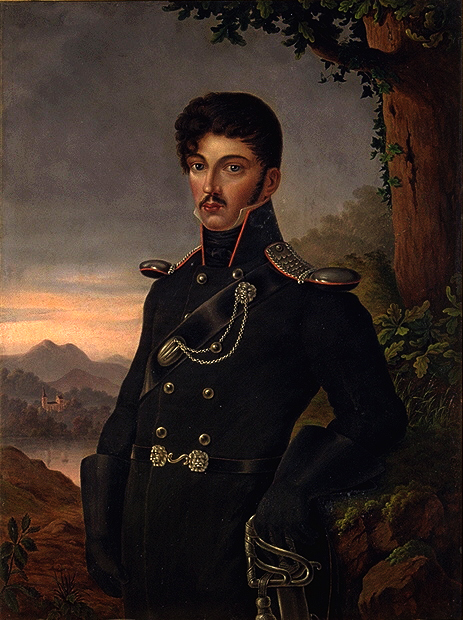
Dora Stock's posthumous portrait (1815) of her nephew Theodor Körner. He is shown in his Freikorps uniform, standing under an oak.

Stock worked with three favorite media: pastels, oils, and silverpoint. She was a gifted copyist, and according to Siegel "could not keep up with the number of requests for copies of works in the Dresden Paintings Gallery."

She was a member of the Dresden Academy of Art; her work was exhibited there five times during the years 1800–1813.

=== Later life ===
The years 1813–1815 were difficult and tragic ones for Stock. Dresden was in chaos from the terminal stages of the Napoleonic Wars, with the homes (the Körner home included) taken over by French soldiers and great numbers of civilian deaths. Stock's nephew Theodor, who had volunteered for the Freikorps to fight against Napoleon, died in action (1813); and niece Emma died of a short illness two years later, leaving the Körners childless. Stock, who had been like a second mother to her sister's children, was as devastated as Minna and Gottfried were. Finally, Gottfried fell into conflict with Frederick Augustus, the ruler of Saxony, and lost his job.

In 1815 the three moved to Berlin, where Gottfried had found a position as a civil servant, and there she spent the remainder of her life. She ceased to paint or draw after about 1821, due to illness.

== The Mozart portrait ==
Probably the most famous of all Stock's portraits is her rendering of Wolfgang Amadeus Mozart. This may be the last portrait of Mozart made from life, and it is widely reproduced.

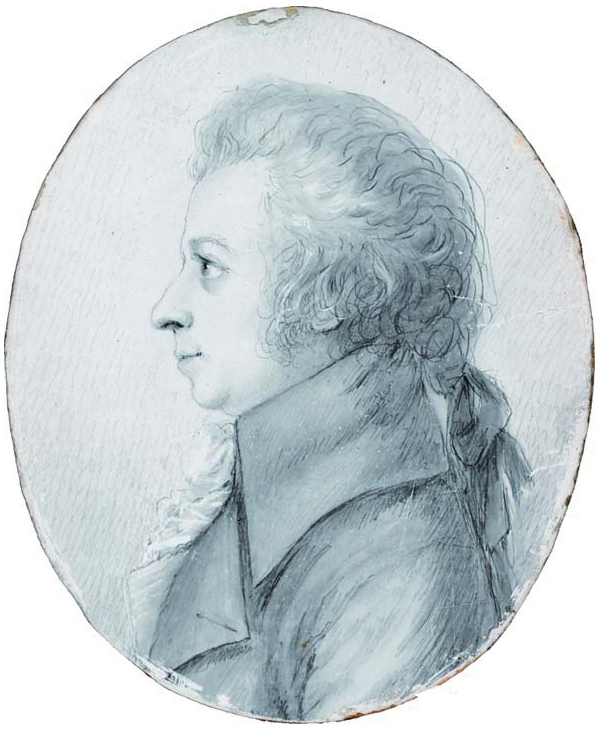
Dora Stock's 1789 portrait of Mozart

In April 1789, when she produced this portrait, Dora Stock was living in Dresden with Minna and Gottfried, still imagining herself to be engaged to the distant Huber. At this time, Mozart was passing through town and giving concerts, as part of the Berlin journey he made during Spring 1789. On either 16 or 17 April 1789, Mozart made a social visit to the Körner home. Stock took the occasion to sketch a portrait of Mozart in silverpoint on ivory board, shown here.

Apparently silverpoint was not widely practiced at the time; Dora may have learned the medium from her father.

The portrait is quite small: 7.6 by 6.0 centimeters.

=== History of the portrait ===
Albi Rosenthal, the picture's one-time owner, indicates that the portrait was kept by Friedrich Körner (whom he does not identify) for some 50 years after it was made. Its further history was given by the German newspaper Die Welt: "the picture passed from the Körners to the conductor Carl Eckert; later it was possessed by Henri Hinrichsen, the owner of the C. F. Peters music publishers of Leipzig. He was murdered in Auschwitz in 1942. His heirs gave the picture to the Rosenthal family in thanks for their help."

Albi Rosenthal died in 2004. At the end of 2005, his heirs sold the picture to the International Mozarteum Foundation in Salzburg for 250,000 British pounds. Being very fragile, it is kept in the museum's protective vaults; only a replica is on display.

=== Stock's Mozart anecdote ===
Long after her death, Gustav Parthey published a book called Jugenderinnerungen ("Remembrances of youth", 1871). He related a tale about Mozart's visit that Dora Stock had told him during her lifetime:

Mozart himself, during his short stay in Dresden, was an almost daily visitor to the Körners' house. For the charming and witty Doris he was all aflame and with his south German vivacity he paid her the naïvest compliments. He generally came shortly before dinner and, after he had poured out a stream of gallant phrases, he sat down to improvise at the pianoforte. In the next room the table was meanwhile being set and the soup dished up, and the servant announced that dinner was served. But who could tear himself away when Mozart was improvising! The soup was allowed to grow cold and the roast to burn, simply so that we could continue to listen to the magic sound which the master, completely absorbed in what he was doing and unaware of the rest of the world, conjured from the instrument. Yet one finally grows tired even of the highest pleasures when the stomach makes known its demands. After the soup had grown cold a few times while Mozart played, he was briefly taken to task. "Mozart", said Doris, gently laying her snow-white arm on his shoulder, "Mozart, we are going in to dine; do you want to eat with us?" But it was precisely Mozart who never did come; he played on undisturbed. Thus we often had the rarest Mozartian musical accompaniment to our meal, Doris concluded her narrative, and when we rose from table we found him still sitting at the keyboard.

Deutsch (reference below) notes that the anecdote probably exaggerates the number of times that Mozart visited the Körner home. The house was on the street in Dresden now called the Körnergasse.
