= Classic pentathlon =

Athletic multisport competition

Classic Pentathlon

Characteristics
- Type: Fencing, swimming, shot put, shooting, and running sport

Presence
- Country or region: Germany

Classic Pentathlon (German: Klassischer Fünfkampf), formally known as Friesenkampf, is an athletic multisport competition with a history that goes back to 1928. It consists of fencing, swimming, air rifle shooting, running and shot put. Classic Pentathlon is almost exclusively practiced by fencers and Modern pentathletes in Germany.

== History ==
Classic Pentathlon stands in the tradition of various athletic multisport competitions of the early 20th century. The first competition was held in Düsseldorf in 1928 and was named Friesenkampf in honor of Friedrich Friesen. The Friesenkampf was created with the intend to complement the athletic abilities of fencers. Nonetheless, the German Gymnastics Federation was responsible for the administration until 2022.

In 2023, the national German fencing federation Deutscher Fechter-Bund (DFB) took over, modified the regulations and renamed it Klassischer Fünfkampf. It consists of:

- Air rifle shooting: 10 shots at 10 m
- Running: sprint (depending on age: 50, 75 or 100 m) or middle distance (1000 m)
- Shot put
- Swimming: breaststroke or freestyle (depending on age: 50 or 100 m)
- Fencing: round-robbin épée bouts to three hits in 2 minutes

Each athlete competes in all five disciplines and earns points based on performance. The athlete with the highest score at the end of the competition wins.

== Disciplines ==
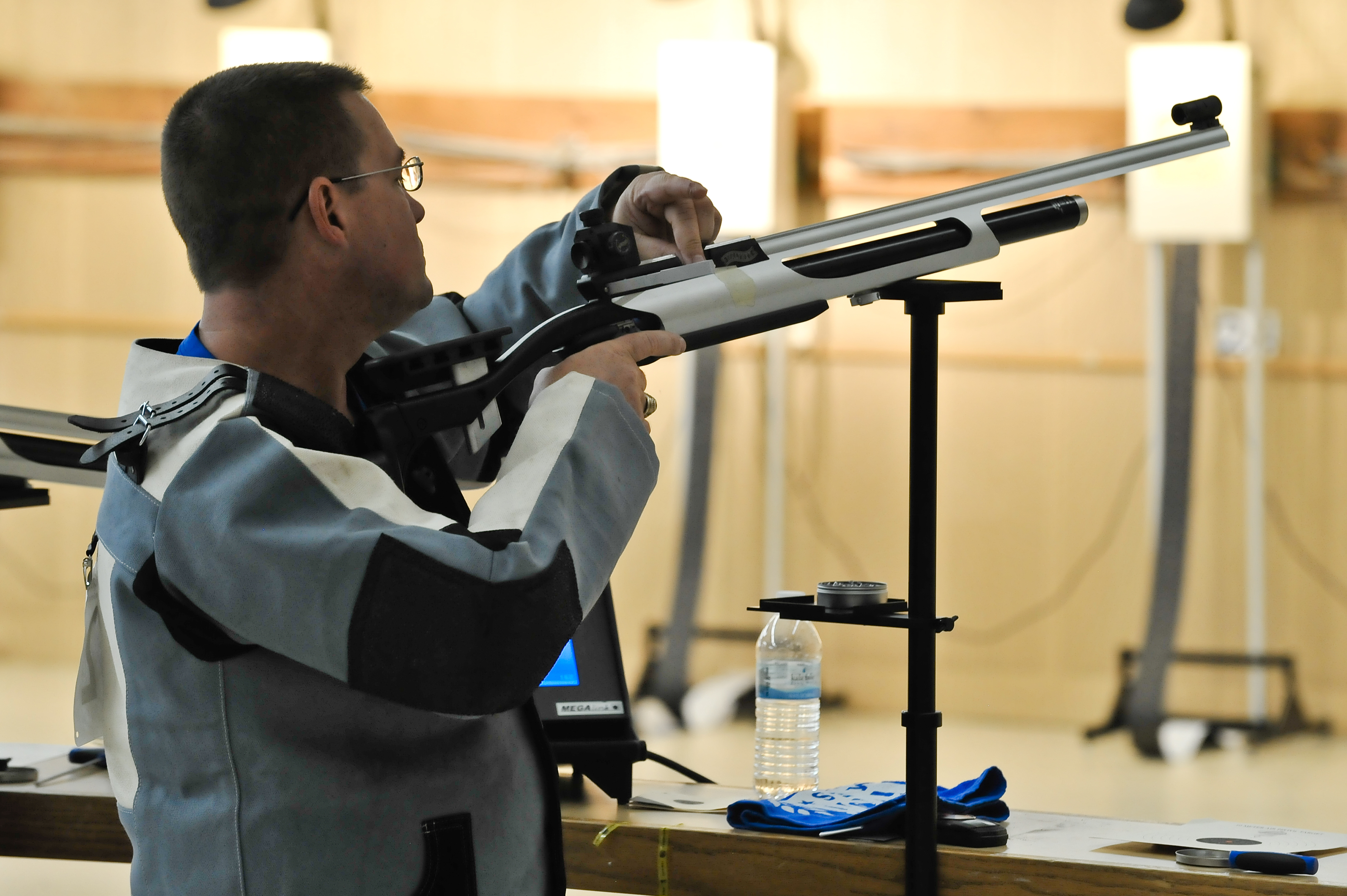
Air rifle shooting

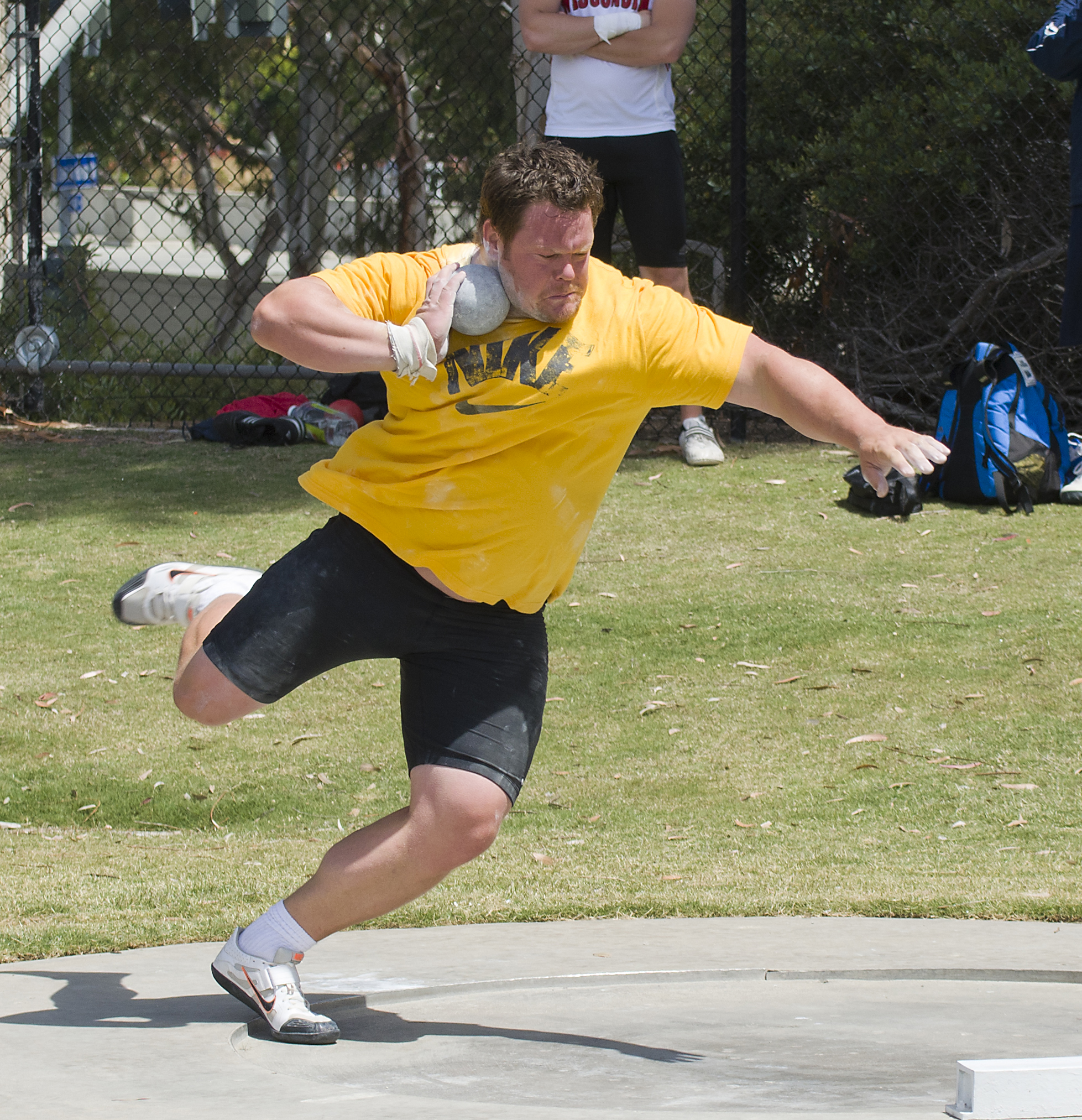
Shot put

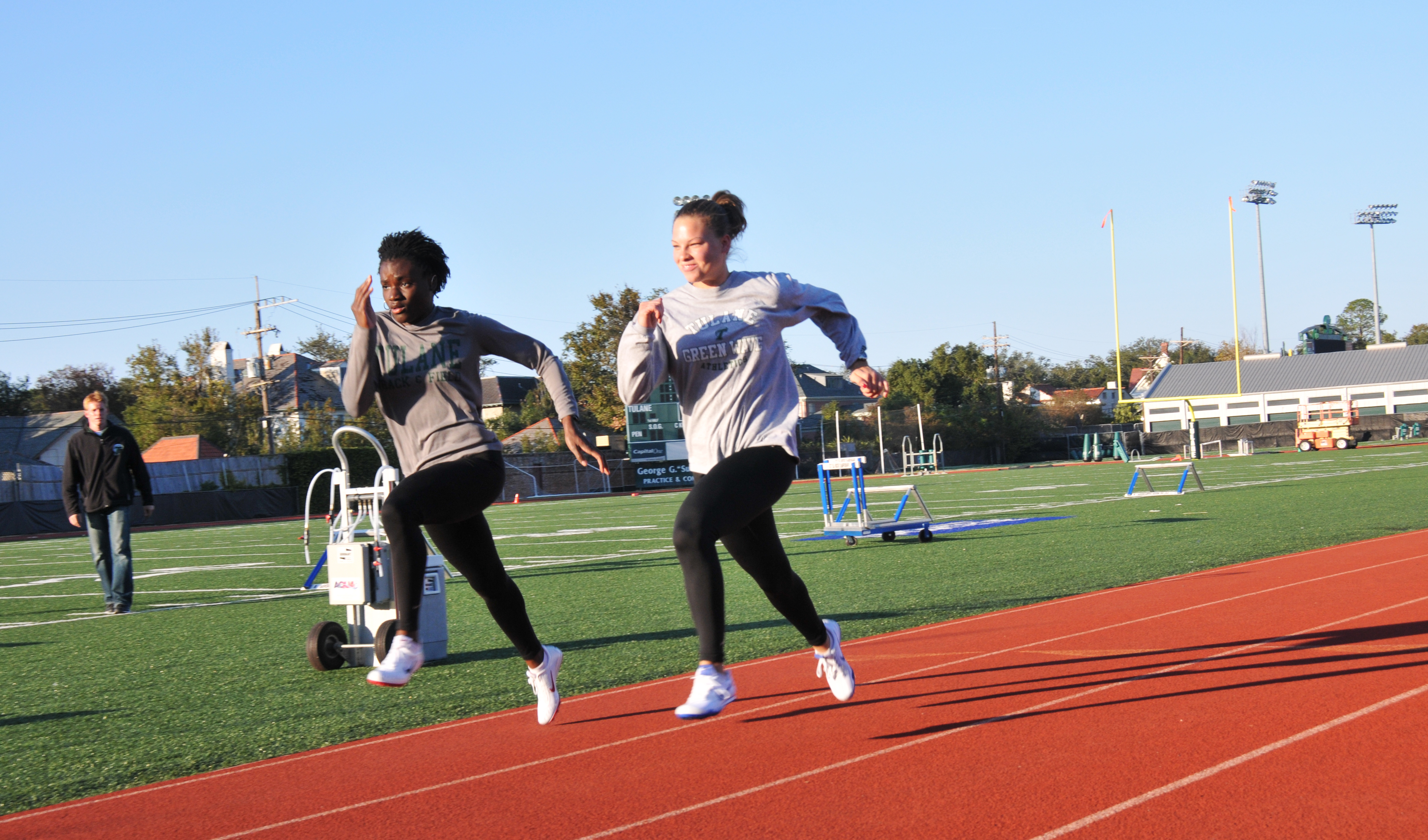
Running

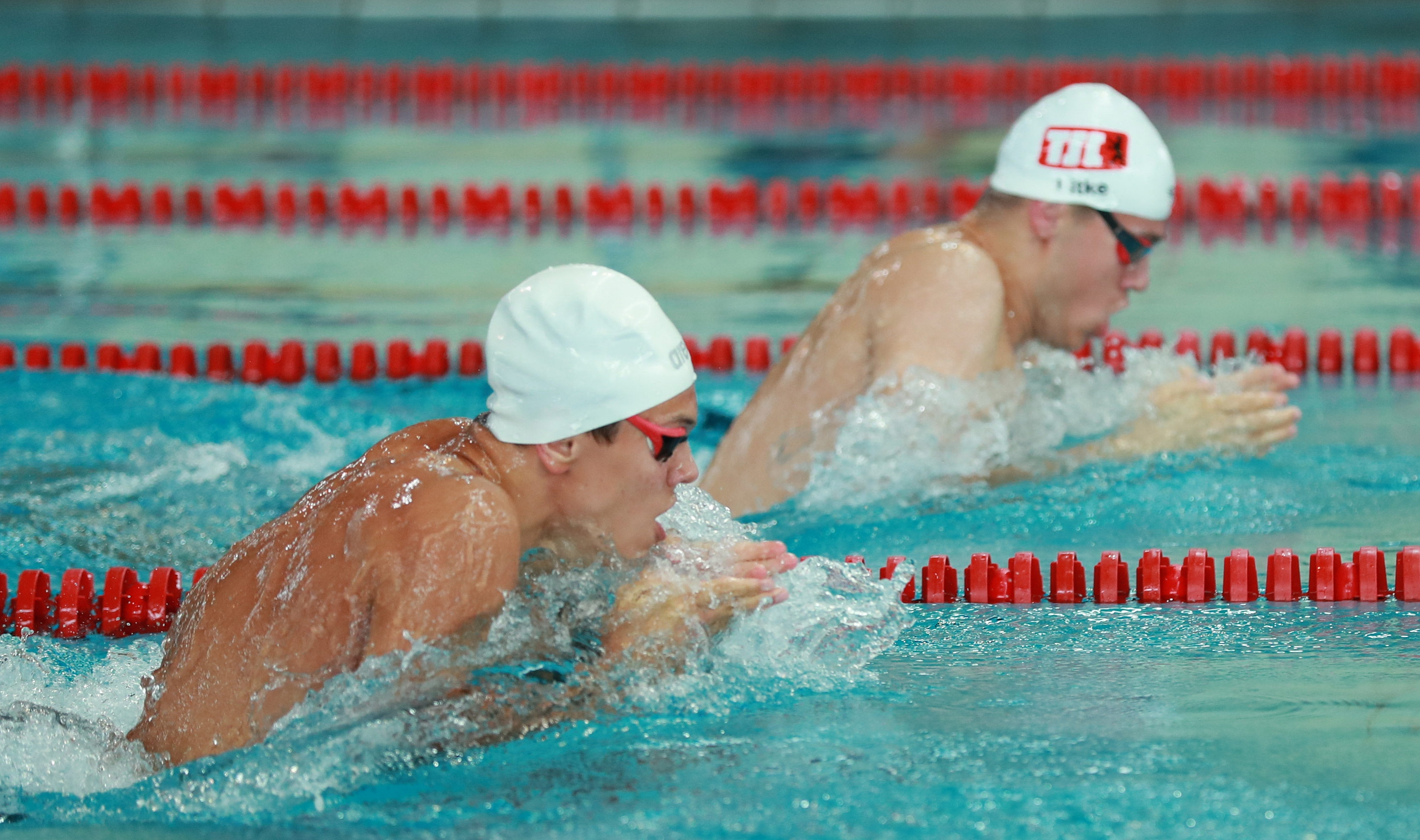
Swimming (freestyle or breaststroke)

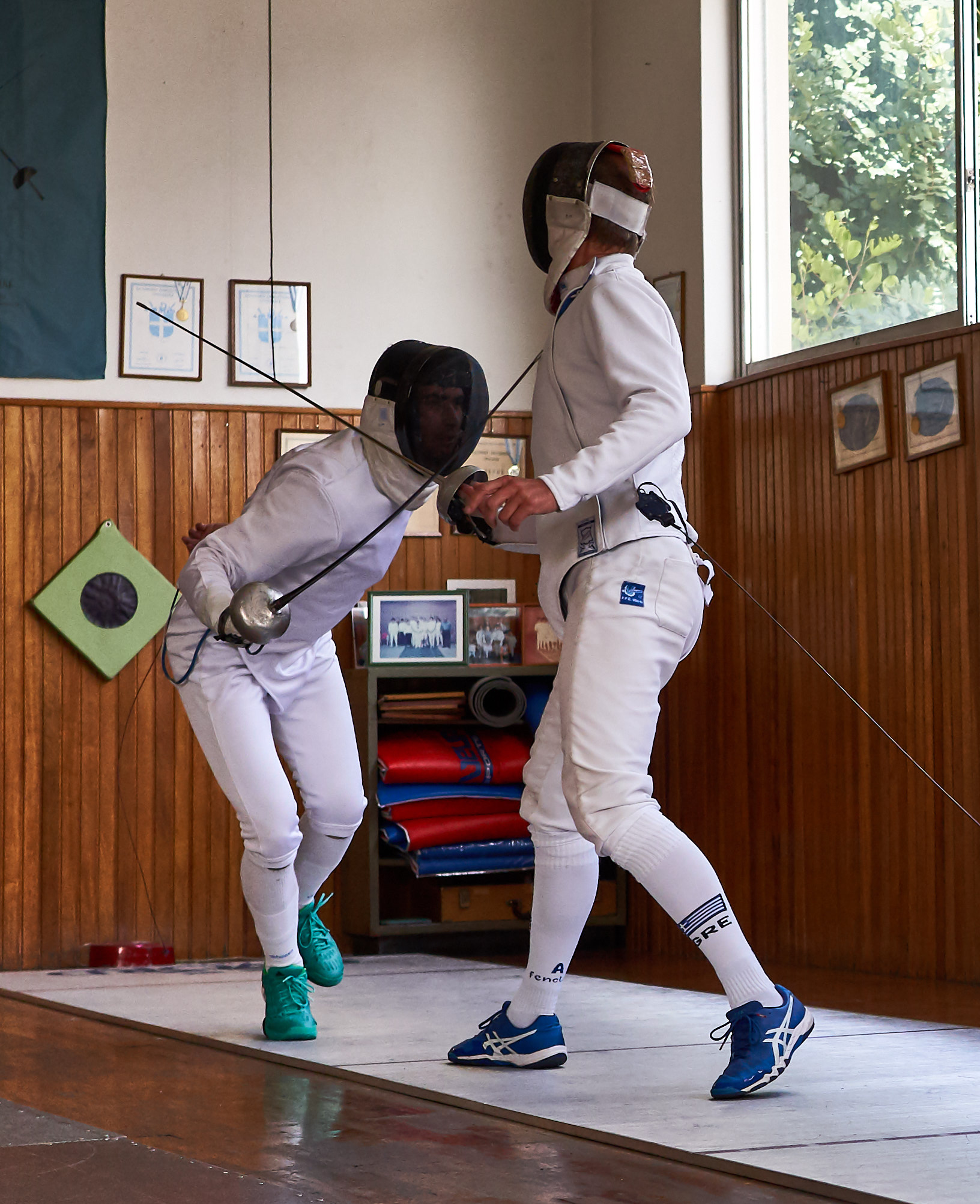
Épée fencing

== Links ==
- Homepage Klassischer Fünfkampf (in German)
- Friesenkampf rules (in German)
- History of Friesenkampf (in German)
