= Wöbbelin, Mecklenburg-Vorpommern =

- Municipality
- Location of Wöbbelin, Mecklenburg-Vorpommern within Ludwigslust-Parchim district
- Interactive map of Wöbbelin, Mecklenburg-Vorpommern
- Location within Germany Location within Mecklenburg-Vorpommern
- Coordinates: 53°23′N 11°30′E
- Country: Germany
- State: Mecklenburg-Vorpommern
- District: Ludwigslust-Parchim
- Municipal assoc.: Ludwigslust-Land
- Subdivisions: 3

Government
  - Mayor: Cornelia Schubring

Area
  - Total: 23.51 km^{2} (9.08 sq mi)
- Elevation: 34 m (112 ft)

Population (2025-12-31)
  - Total: 948
  - Density: 40.3/km^{2} (104/sq mi)
- Time zone: UTC+01:00 (CET)
  - Summer (DST): UTC+02:00 (CEST)
- Postal codes: 19288
- Dialling codes: 038753
- Vehicle registration: LWL
- Website: www.amt-ludwigslust-land.de

Wöbbelin is a municipality in the Ludwigslust-Parchim district in Mecklenburg-Vorpommern, Germany. The municipality has a seat in the office of Ludwigslust from where it is administered. Wöbbelin consists of three areas: Dreenkrögen, the "Funkamtsiedlung", a housing development and buildings supporting a former radio broadcasting station, and the main town, Wöbbelin.

== History ==
Wöbbelin was first mentioned in 1333 as "Wopelyn". In 1813, Theodor Körner, "Dichter der Freiheitskriege", the "poet of the wars of liberation", who died in Gadebusch on 1813-08-26, was buried in Wöbbelin. The monument to Theodor Körner on his grave was designed by the architect, Gottlob Friedrich Thormeyer, and solemnly opened on 1814-09-23. The grove with the graves of Körner and some family relatives (his sister, Emma) became a patriotic memorial place shortly after Körner's death.

In 1938, a year before the beginning of World War II, the "Theodor-Körner-Gedenkstätte", the Theodor Körner memorial place, became a "nationalsozialistischen Weihestätte", a Nazi 'holy' place. On 1945-02-12, a concentration camp, which was a sub-camp of the Neuengamme concentration camp, Hamburg, was set up in the proximity of the district town of Ludwigslust. As it was located on the road to Wöbbelin, it was named the Wöbbelin concentration camp. The camp was taken by American troops on 1945-05-02 and many victims were buried in the cemetery where the Theodor Körner memorial place is located. In the middle of the cemetery, the former "nationalsozialistischen Weihestätte" serves today as a remembrance and memorial place for Wöbbelin and as the headquarters of a museum. The remembrance and memorial place remembers both the "Dichter der Freiheitskriege", Theodor Körner, and the Wöbbelin concentration camp.

In 1952, Wöbbelin became the location for a broadcasting installation used for transmitting medium wave band broadcasts. Two steel, half-timbered masts, 120 metres high, were used in the antenna system. These were developed from a 250-metre-high (820 ft) transmitting mast, which had been located at Königs Wusterhausen and dismantled. During the 1950s, the "Funkamtsiedlung" grew around the broadcasting station. The two transmitting masts were replaced in 1990 by two masts of the same height. The Geneva wave plan of 1975, assigned the frequencies 576 kHz and 999 kHz to Wöbbelin. The latter was emitted over a three corner body antenna and last used by talk radio before being dismantled. The former frequency was used by Megaradio, a privately operated pop music broadcasting station until 2003-04-04. The use of this frequency caused strong disturbances to the reception of SWR, "South West Broadcasting", in Wöbbelin, as SWR operated on the same frequency from Mühlacker. The remaining transmitting masts were demolished November 2005.

== Geography and transport ==
The municipality lies on the federal highway 106 between the cities of Ludwigslust (7 km) and Schwerin (23 km). To the north, Dreenkrögen lies near the junction of the federal motorway 24 for Ludwigslust and a lorry and truck terminal. In Dreenkroegen is a large, 5.95 hectare bathing lake, which resulted from gravel quarrying.
