= Lützow Free Corps =

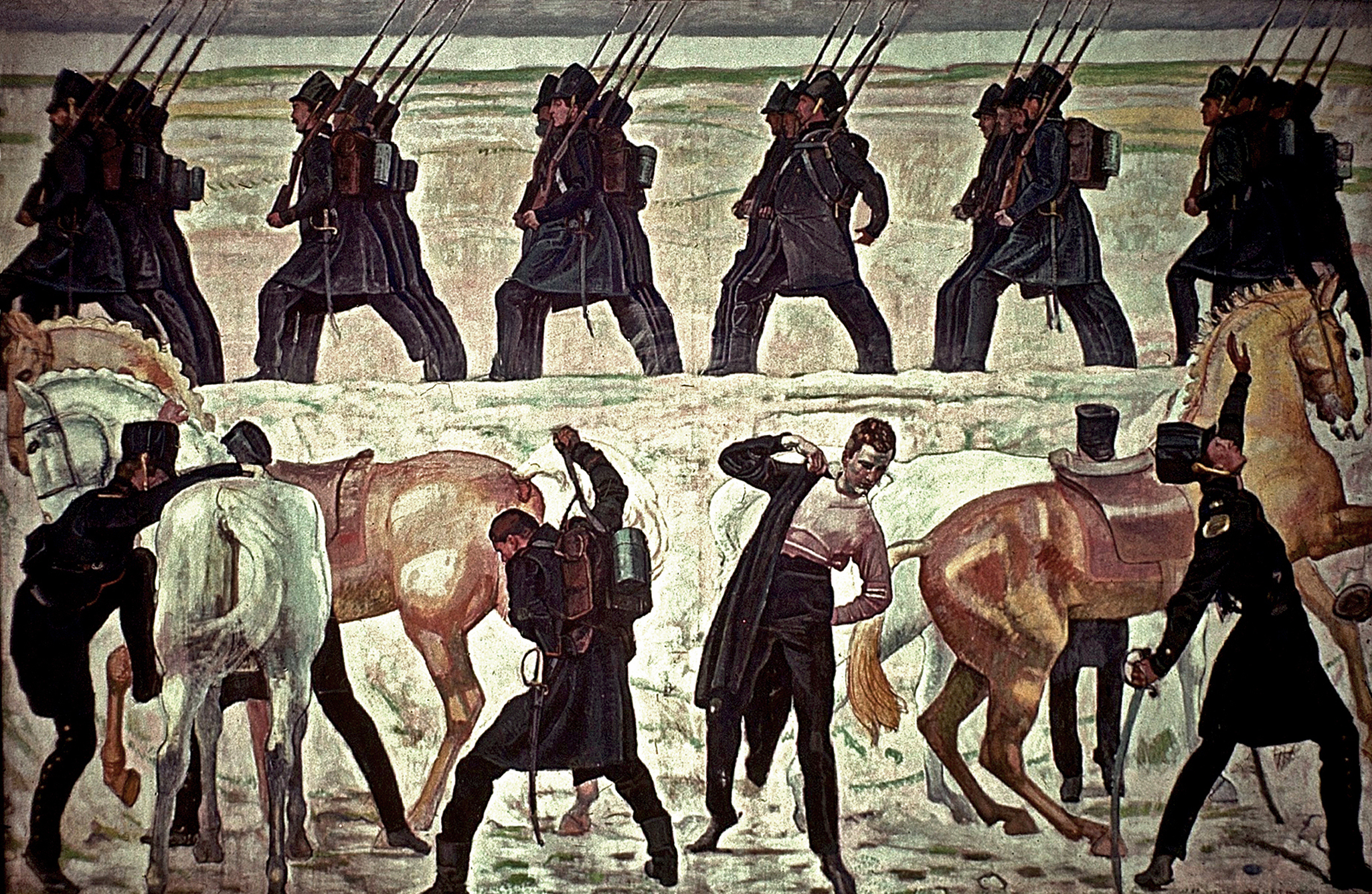
- Painting of Jena students in the corps
- Active: 1813–1815
- Disbanded: 1815
- Allegiance: Prussia
- Branch: Prussian Army
- Type: Infantry
- Role: Free corps
- Size: ~3,600
- Nickname: Schwarze Jäger (Black hunters)
- Colors: Black-red-gold

Commanders
- Notable commanders: Ludwig Adolf Wilhelm von Lützow

Lützow Free Corps (German: Lützowsches Freikorps pronounced [ˈlʏtso:vʃəs ˈfraɪˌkɔɒ̯ps]) was a free corps of the Prussian Army during the Napoleonic Wars. Raised in 1813, it was named after its commander, Ludwig Adolf Wilhelm von Lützow. The troops of the corps were also widely known as the “Lützower Jäger“ or “Schwarze Jäger“ (“Black Hunters”), sometimes also "Lützower Reiter" ("Lützow Riders"). Following the end of the Napoleonic Wars, the corps was disbanded in 1815.

== Origins ==
The free corps unit was officially founded in February 1813 as Königlich Preußisches Freikorps von Lützow (Royal Prussian Free Corps von Lützow). Lützow, who had been an officer under the ill-fated Ferdinand von Schill, obtained permission from the Prussian Chief-of-Staff Gerhard von Scharnhorst to organize a free corps consisting of infantry, cavalry, and Tyrolean Jäger (literally, “hunters” ― i.e., marksmen, snipers), for flank attacks and guerrilla warfare behind the French lines. Volunteers were to be drawn from all over Germany (including Austria) to fight against Napoleon I of France; it was hoped that this broadly national force would aid in rallying the smaller German governments into the ranks of the Allies.

The Corps has been alleged to have consisted mostly of students and academics; however, in reality these amounted to no more than 12% of the total force, which was actually composed mostly of craftsmen and laborers. Besides the well-known Saxon dramatist and poet Carl Theodor Körner, the Corps also included academics, writers, and other well known figures, such as Georg Friedrich Kersting, Friedrich Friesen, Joseph von Eichendorff, and Friedrich Ludwig Jahn. The educator Friedrich Fröbel, who later developed the concept of the Kindergarten, also belonged to the Lützowers. In addition, at least two women, Eleonore Prochaska and Anna Lühring, managed to join in disguise.

The Tyroleans, whose leaders Jakob Riedl and Joseph Ennemoser had fought with Andreas Hofer for the liberation of Tyrol since 1809, came into the Lützow Corps after the armistice of Summer 1813.

== Uniforms ==
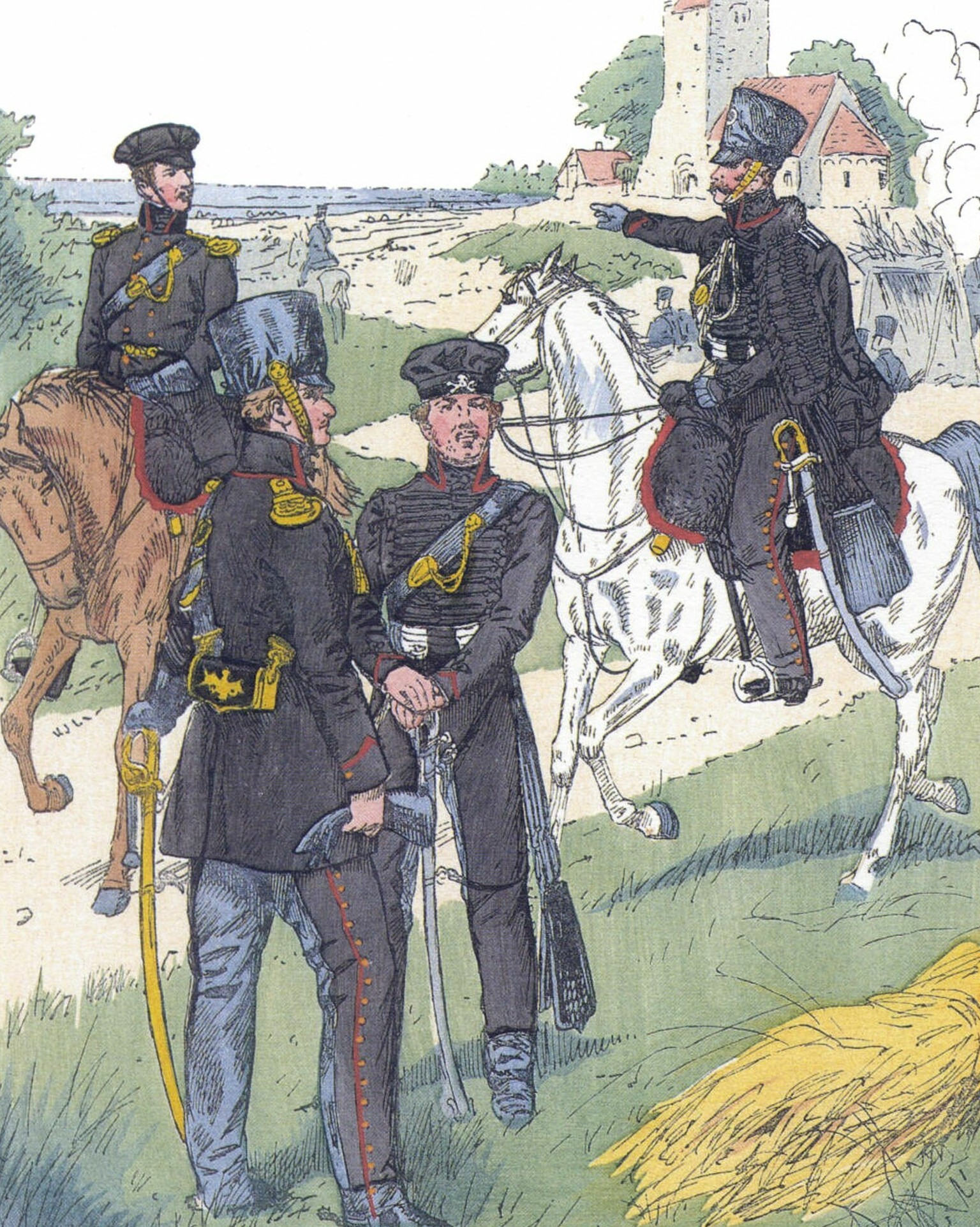
Mounted jägers and hussars of the corps

Because the Kingdom of Prussia already had problems financing and equipping its regular forces, the volunteers had to equip and supply themselves by their own means. Many times civilian clothing or old uniforms ― even enemy uniforms taken as booty ― were simply dyed. Black was therefore used for their uniforms rather than the normal Prussian blue, because this was the only color that could be used to dye the improvised clothing (if any other had been used, the clothing's original color would have shown through, resulting in an unacceptable mix of colors for the Corps as a whole). The quality of the material often left much to be desired.

For similar reasons of economy, a civilian-style trench coat, the so-called litewka frock coat ― double-breasted, without a tail-slit ― was chosen for infantry and rifle detachments, and later extended to the artillery. The tunic was black, as were the trousers, with red trim chosen for the rank insignia along the collar, cuffs, epaulets, and front edge of the tunic; on officers’ uniforms, collars and cuffs were faced in velvet. On the tunic’s front, eight embossed brass buttons were arranged in two vertical rows.

Volunteers with particular skills were allowed to transfer to special units with their own uniforms. Hussars and lancers (uhlans) wore dolman jackets, often brought from their former units, dyed black (as were the hussars’ pelisses). Hussars and lancers wore only black and white, the red being omitted. Officers’ uniforms carried silver cords, rather than white, and were in addition trimmed with black fur. Lützow himself wore the black hussar uniform.

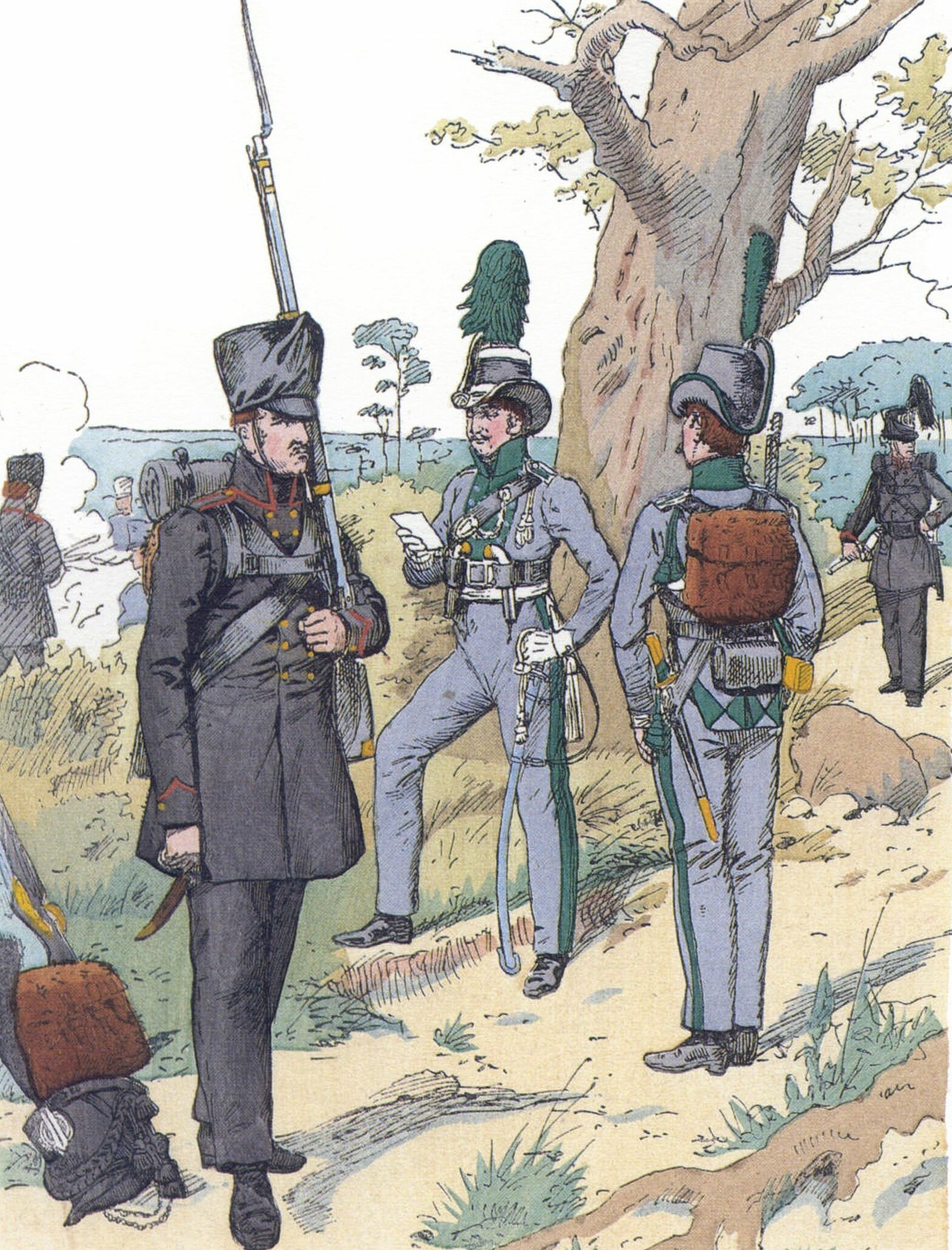
Musketeers and Tyrolean jägers of the corps

The Tyrolean jägers retained their previous uniform, gray with green facings.

Headgear

Due to its improvised nature, headgear worn by the Free Corps was varied. The infantry headgear corresponded to that of Schill’s corps of 1809, consisting of a black shako, with a clasp and side cordon and tassel. The cavalry wore a felt shako (though due to scarce resources, some were made even of cardboard) with a black-and-yellow braid and tassel; often a black oilcloth was worn over them as protection from the weather. For parades, cavalry were accustomed to wear a black horsehair tassel and a black cordon. The Tyroleans continued to wear the turned up and plumed hats of their native region.

In addition, some volunteers sported peaked caps or even large berets. Often against orders the symbol of a civilian or student society would be attached. In the early days of the Corps, Lützow and others also wore a skull on their headgear (in the same manner as the Duke of Brunswick’s Schwarze Schar), until forbidden by royal command.

== Combat ==
The Lützow Free Corps distinguished itself from the mass of the army, in that it was a voluntary association, whose members were remarkable for superior activity, energy, and enterprise. Unlike many of the regular army, their loyalty was rather to Germany as a whole than to Prussia or the House of Hohenzollern; many of them made a vow to neither cut their hair nor their beards till they had driven the French entirely out of German lands. Nevertheless, it had the highest percentage of deserters in the Army of Prussia, was treated with marked coolness by the King (who was anything but an ardent nationalist and anyway preferred his regulars), and accomplished relatively little in the way of major military success.

The average size of the Corps was 2,900 infantry, 600 cavalry and 120 artillery, varying throughout the war. It fought in many battles, operating first independently in the rear of the French troops, later as a regular unit in the allied armies. The Lützowers displayed great gallantry throughout the remainder of the war, and proved a source of constant annoyance to the French, who regarded them with exceptional hostility, Napoleon himself referring to their chief as ce brigand Lützow, chef du corps de la Vengeance" ("that bandit Lützow, head of the band of Revenge").

At the proclamation of the armistice of 4 June – 13 August 1813, the Corps, eager to gain a dashing victory against the hated emperor, had been deep behind enemy lines and were hastening back to German-held territory (supposedly under a French safe-conduct), when they were caught there in contradiction to the terms of armistice. The French general Fournier ordered an attack on the Corps, replying to a demand for explanation, "Armistice pour tout le monde, excepté pour vous!" ("truce for everyone, except for you").

After the peace of 1814 the Corps was dissolved. The infantry were converted into the 25th Infantry Regiment (from 5 November 1816 known as the 1st Rhine) as regular infantrymen, consisting of 2419 men (82 officers / 2337 troops) organized into a 1st Battalion, 2nd Battalion, and 3rd Battalion, under the command of Christian Friedrich Engel von Petersdorff (who had been a major under Lützow); the cavalry were reorganized into the 6th Ulans under Lützow himself. After Napoleon’s return from Elba, both regiments fought at Ligny and Waterloo during the Hundred Days. The composition of their units remained unique and still bore the impress of the Lützow corps, e.g., retaining the same black litewka and shako.

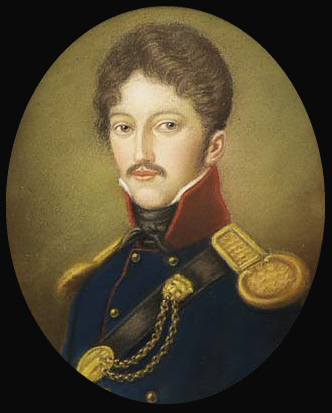
Theodor Körner (Pastel Miniature by Emma Körner, 1813)

== Theodor Körner ==
Upon hearing that the then Major von Lützow had announced the formation of the Free Corps, on 15 March 1813 Theodor Körner abandoned a promising career as a dramatist in Vienna and his engagement with the beautiful actress Antonie Adamberger. Inspired with the Romantic nationalism of the times, Körner felt himself irresistibly attracted towards a body consisting of volunteers drawn from all over the numerous German realms. On his arrival at Breslau with recommendations to the most influential men in the Prussian army, he joined the Corps on 19 March. As a member of the Corps he contributed songs and poems to celebrate and encourage his fellows, often accompanying himself on the guitar; many of these poems were later published by his father in the collection Leyer und Schwerdt (modern Leier und Schwert, “Lyre and Sword”) (Berlin, 1814). On 26 August an engagement took place at the forest of Rosenow near Gadebusch, in which Körner fell. Theodor Körner died at the age of twenty-one, and was buried under an oak in the village of Wöbbelin, about a mile from Ludwigslust.

== Legacy ==
Despite its relatively small size and its lack of military success, the Corps became famous after the war, as it was the only unit in the army consisting of people from all over the German states.

Throughout the 19th century, these anti-Napoleonic Free Corps were greatly praised and glorified by German nationalists, and a heroic myth built up around their exploits. Inasmuch as many Lützow Free Corps veterans took part in the first Wartburg festival of 1817, demanding German unity and democratic reforms, the black-red-gold color scheme formed by the combination of black cloth, red trim, and brass buttons on their uniforms would later become associated with republican and nationalist (or Pan-German) ideals. During the Hambacher Fest of 1832 and Revolutions of 1848 in the German states, flags with these colors were used, if even often displayed in reverse order compared to modern day's flag of Germany. This combination, reminiscent of the Holy Roman Empire of the German Nation (whose heraldic coat-of-arms depicted a black eagle on a shield of gold, often in later times with red beak and legs), was selected as the official national colors of the German flag in 1919, and again in 1949.

In the aftermath of Germany’s defeat in the First World War, the legend was invoked by extremist groups with far greater emphasis on its nationalism than on republicanism. Consequently, one of the paramilitary Freikorps active in the period of the Weimar Republic took the name “Freikorps Lützow.”

== Film ==
The story of the Lützow Free Corps served as the basis for several historical films:

- Was Steine erzählen (“What the Stones Tell”) (Germany 1925, directed by Rudolf Randolf)
- Lützows wilde verwegene Jagd (“Lützow's Wild Hunt”) (Germany 1927, directed by Richard Oswald)
- Theodor Körner (Germany 1932, directed by Carl Boese)
- Lützower (German Democratic Republic 1972, directed by Werner W. Wallroth)
