= Theodor Körner (author) =

German poet (1791–1813)

Carl Theodor Körner
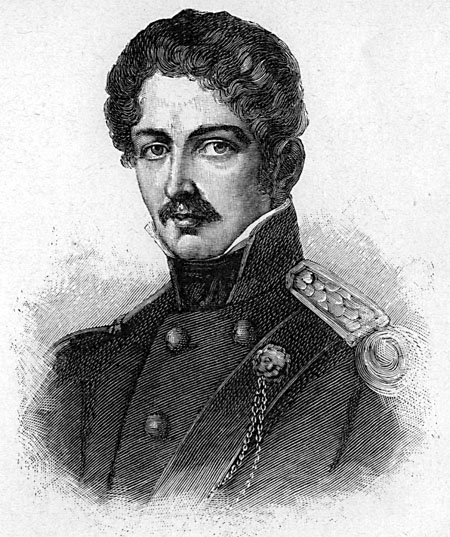
- Ludwig Adolf Wilhelm Freiherr von Lützow's adjutant 2nd Lieutenant Theodor Körner
- Born: 23 September 1791; Dresden, Saxony, Holy Roman Empire of the German Nation
- Died: 26 August 1813 (aged 21); Forest of Rosenow near Gadebusch, Mecklenburg
- Resting place: Wöbbelin
- Occupations: Poet, Soldier
- Writing career
- Language: German
- Notable awards: Iron Cross (1813), 2nd Class

Carl Theodor Körner (German pronunciation: [ˈkaʁl ˈteːodoːɐ̯ ˈkœʁnɐ]; 23 September 1791 – 26 August 1813) was a German poet and soldier. After having lived for some time in Vienna, where he wrote some light comedies and other works for the Burgtheater, he became a soldier and joined the Lützow Free Corps in the German uprising against Napoleon. During this time, he displayed personal courage in many fights, and inspired his comrades by fiery patriotic lyrics he composed. One of these was the "Schwertlied" ('Sword Song'), composed during a lull in fighting, only a few hours before his death, and "Lützow's wilde Jagd", each set to music by both Carl Maria von Weber and Franz Schubert. He was often called the "German Tyrtaeus".

== Early life ==
He was born at Dresden, capital of the Saxon electorate, the son of the consistorial councillor Christian Gottfried Körner and his wife Minna Stock Körner. He was raised by his parents and by his aunt, the artist Dora Stock, who lived in the home. He attended the Kreuzschule.

After his education, he chose mining as an occupation. He moved to Vienna, where he befriended Wilhelm von Humboldt, the Prussian ambassador; Karl Wilhelm Friedrich von Schlegel; and other eminent literary and scientific men. Here, within the short space of fifteen months, he produced a succession of dramas, operas, and farces, as well as several small poems. The success of his works obtained him the appointment of poet to the court at the Vienna Burgtheater. It was in this period of his life that he became betrothed to the popular actress Antonie Adamberger. In Vienna, he also met and knew Ludwig van Beethoven. Körner was writing a libretto to an opera specifically for Beethoven to compose but he died before completing it and sending the text to Beethoven.

During the War of the Sixth Coalition, he left Vienna in March 1813, and together with Friedrich Friesen and Friedrich Ludwig Jahn joined the Lützow Free Corps, a voluntary paramilitary association which Ludwig Adolf Wilhelm von Lützow was then forming in Breslau, Silesia. On his way from Vienna to Breslau, he noticed a Prussian border eagle in the area of Neustadt, which inspired him to write a poem, Der Grenzadler ('Border Eagle'). In the midst of the most active campaigns, Körner continued to write poetry and other works. He wrote a singspiel, Der vierjährige Posten, which was set to music by Franz Schubert in 1815, but the piece was not performed until 1869, when it was staged at the Hofoper, Dresden. It was later adapted in English as The Outpost.

== Napoleonic Wars ==
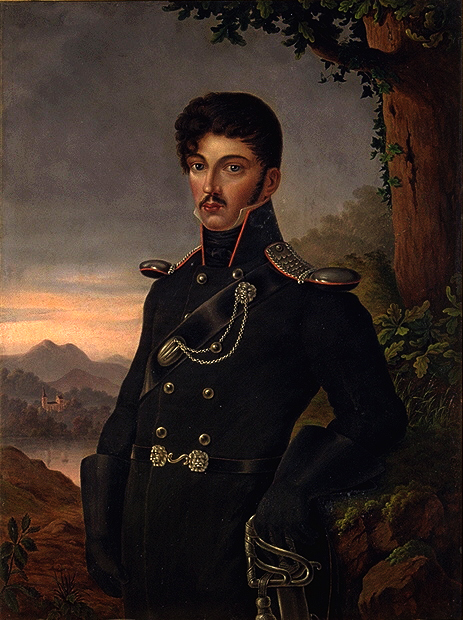
Posthumous portrait in Lützow uniform by his aunt Dora Stock (1814)

Having taken up quarters at Zobten, on 28 March 1813 Major von Lützow had determined on setting out on an expedition to Saxony and Thuringia, with four squadrons of his cavalry, and fifty cossacks. Körner arrived at Dresden on 6 April, taking the occasion to visit his family. In Leipzig, the Free Corps missed the opportunity to participate in the battles of Möckern and Lützen. Major von Lützow marched northwards, then, hearing of the French retreat from Hamburg, again turned to the south. Körner was frustrated, but earnestly entreated permission to accompany him, and his desire was fulfilled when he was appointed adjutant by Lützow, who highly esteemed him, and wished to have him near his person.

They marched from Halberstadt via Eisleben, Buttstädt to Schleiz, and finally reached Eichigt near Plauen in Vogtland within a few days—not without encountering the enemy, who were dispersed throughout these districts, but, also, not without effecting some important results. Intelligence and information were procured, ammunition was captured, and prisoners were taken. As a result, Napoleon was determined to destroy the corps, and the 1813 armistice provided an opportunity for putting it in practice.

Major von Lützow had received official information of the armistice concluded at Plauen on 4 June. Without expecting to meet with any opposition, he chose the shortest route to rejoin the infantry of his corps, having received assurance of safety from the enemy's commanding officers, and proceeded, without interruption, back to Kitzen near Leipzig; but here he found himself surrounded and menaced by a very superior force. Körner was despatched to demand an explanation; but, instead of replying, the French General François Fournier-Sarlovèze struck at him with his sword, and ordered a general attack be made on the three squadrons of the Lützow cavalry. Several were wounded and taken, and others dispersed in the surrounding country; but Major von Lützow himself was saved by the assistance of a squadron of Uhlans, who had been in advance with the Cossacks. He reached, with a considerable number of his troops, the right bank of the Elbe, where the infantry of his corps, and a squadron of its cavalry, were already collected.

Körner had received the first blow, which he was not prepared to parry, as he approached the enemy's commanding officer to deliver his message, and was severely wounded in the head. He managed to escape on his horse to a nearby forest. After he had assisted a wounded comrade, he noticed an enemy troop that was in pursuit of him, and called with a loud voice, "Fourth squadron,—Advance!" His ruse succeeded—the enemy drew back, and he was able to retreat farther into the forest. The pain of his head wound had become very severe. It was in this position that he composed the sonnet "Abschied vom Leben" ('Farewell to Life'), of which the following is a translation: (Note: Abschied vom Leben (A literal translation from the German) My wounds burn, my pale lips quiver. I feel it in my heart's dull beat, Here I stand at the milestone of my days, God, whatever You want! I've resigned myself to You. I saw a myriad golden images floating around me; The beautiful dream has become a dirge. Courage! Courage! That which I faithfully carry in my heart Must still live there with me forever! And that which I regarded as sacred here on earth, That which in my rash and youthful zeal I pursued, Whether I called it freedom, or whether I called it love, I see those things before me now in the form of a shining angel And as my senses slowly fade, A breath lifts me on high in the red glow of morning. Source: "Abschied vom Leben" on German Wikisource)

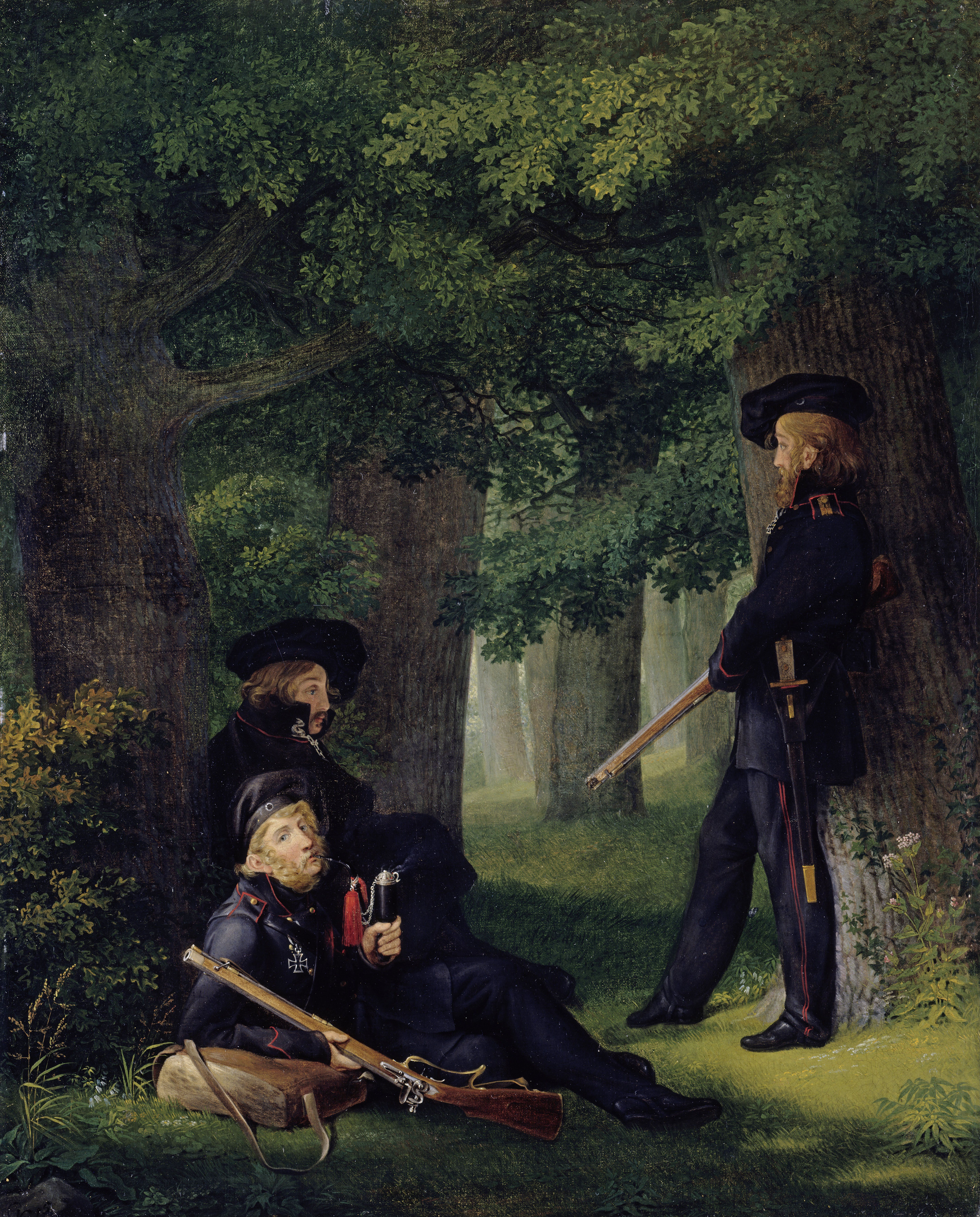
Heinrich Hartmann (lying, left) Theodor Körner (sitting, middle) and Friedrich Friesen (standing, right) at a forward post, by Georg Friedrich Kersting (1815). All three are wearing the uniform of the Jäger and the Iron Cross, 2nd Class.

Farewell to Life
(Written in the night of the 17th and 18th of June, as I lay, severely wounded and helpless in a wood, expecting to die.)

"My deep wound burns;—my pale lips quake in death,—
I feel my fainting heart resign its strife,
And reaching now the limit of my life,
Lord, to thy will I yield my parting breath!

Yet many a dream hath charm'd my youthful eye;
And must life's fairy visions all depart;
Oh surely no! for all that fired my heart
To rapture here, shall live with me on high.

And that fair form that won my earliest vow,
That my young spirit prized all else above,
And now adored as freedom, now as love,
Stands in seraphic guise, before me now.

And as my fading senses fade away,
It beckons me, on high, to realms of endless day!" (Note: Poetic translation by George Fleming Richardson (1796–1848).)

During the night he heard the enemy searching the forest near him, but afterwards fell asleep, and was saved in the morning by two peasants. He was conveyed secretly into Leipzig, which was then under French control, and where the concealment of any of the Lützow Free Corps was prohibited, under severe punishment. Guided to Gnandstein Castle and later to Carlsbad in Bohemia, he subsequently travelled to Berlin, and having recovered from his wound, rejoined the Lützow corps in Mecklenburg.

== Death ==
Hostilities recommenced on 17 August 1813; Körner spent the night of 25 August at Gottesgabe manor, where he played the piano and sang. In the early morning of the next day, an engagement took place at the nearby forest of Rosenow near Gadebusch, in which Körner fell. He had been in pursuit of a group of the enemy, when the riflemen, who had found a rallying-place in some under-wood, sent forth a shower of balls upon their pursuers. By one of these Körner was wounded in the abdomen, the liver and spine were injured, and he was immediately deprived of speech and consciousness. He was carried to a neighbouring wood, but could not be revived. He was buried under an oak in the village of Wöbbelin, about 8.5 km from Ludwigslust. A tomb has since been placed over his remains, and enclosed by a wall. Körner died at the age of twenty-one. His Poetischer Nachlass were edited by his father and published at Leipzig in 1815.

According to J.R. Miller in "Homemaking" (now published as "The Family"), Körner had a very close friendship with his sister Emma, and when he died, "she survived him only long enough to complete his portrait and to draw with the pencil of love a sketch of his last resting-place." (In fact, Emma Körner survived her brother by two years, dying of a fever in Dresden four weeks after a visit to her brother's grave. She was buried next to him in Wöbbelin.) Miller quotes a poem by "Mrs. Hemans" about their mutual devotion.

== Works ==
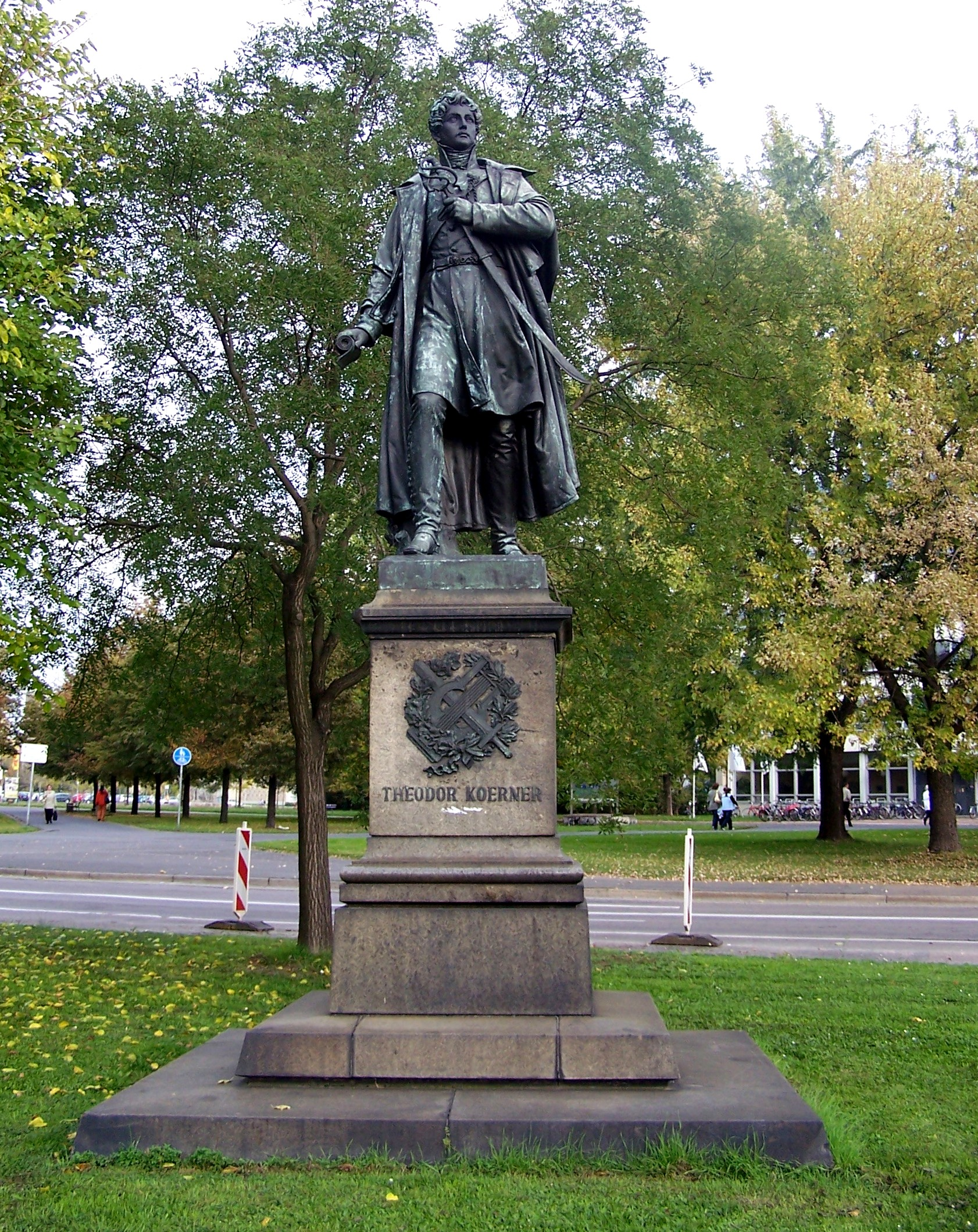
Statue of Körner in Dresden (Ernst Julius Hähnel)

His first volume of poems was published under the title of Knospen ('Buds', 1810). Of his light comedies, Die Braut ('The Bride', 1812) and Der grüne Domino ('The Green Domino', 1812) were very successful, and Der Nachtwächter ('The Night Watchman', 1812) was notable as was Sword Song. The drama Zriny, an historical tragedy, is the most ambitious of his works. Many of the poems from his years in the Lützow Free Corps were set to music by Carl Maria von Weber and Franz Schubert.

A selection of his battle songs was prepared by his father and published under the title of Leyer und Schwerdt (modern Leier und Schwert, 'Lyre and Sword') (Berlin, 1814). His complete works were published by the direction of his mother, and edited by Streckfuss (1 vol., Berlin, 1834; 4 vols., 1838).

The Italian poet and novelist Alessandro Manzoni dedicated his ode "Marzo 1821" to Theodor Körner.

== Bibliography ==
His Life, written by his Father, with his Selections from his Poems, Tales, and Dramas, translated from the German by G. F. Richardson, appeared in London in 1845. Biographical and critical studies are by Bauer (Stuttgart, 1883), Rogge (Wittenberg, 1891), Kregenberg (Dresden, 1892), Jaden, (Dresden, 1896), Peschel and Wildenow (Leipzig, 1898) and Peschel (Dresden, 1901).

== Publications ==
- Zeiner, Körner als Dramatiker (Stockerau, 1900)
- Strucker, Beiträge zur kritischen Würdigung der dramatischen Dichtungen Körners (no place, 1910)
