= Friedrich Friesen =

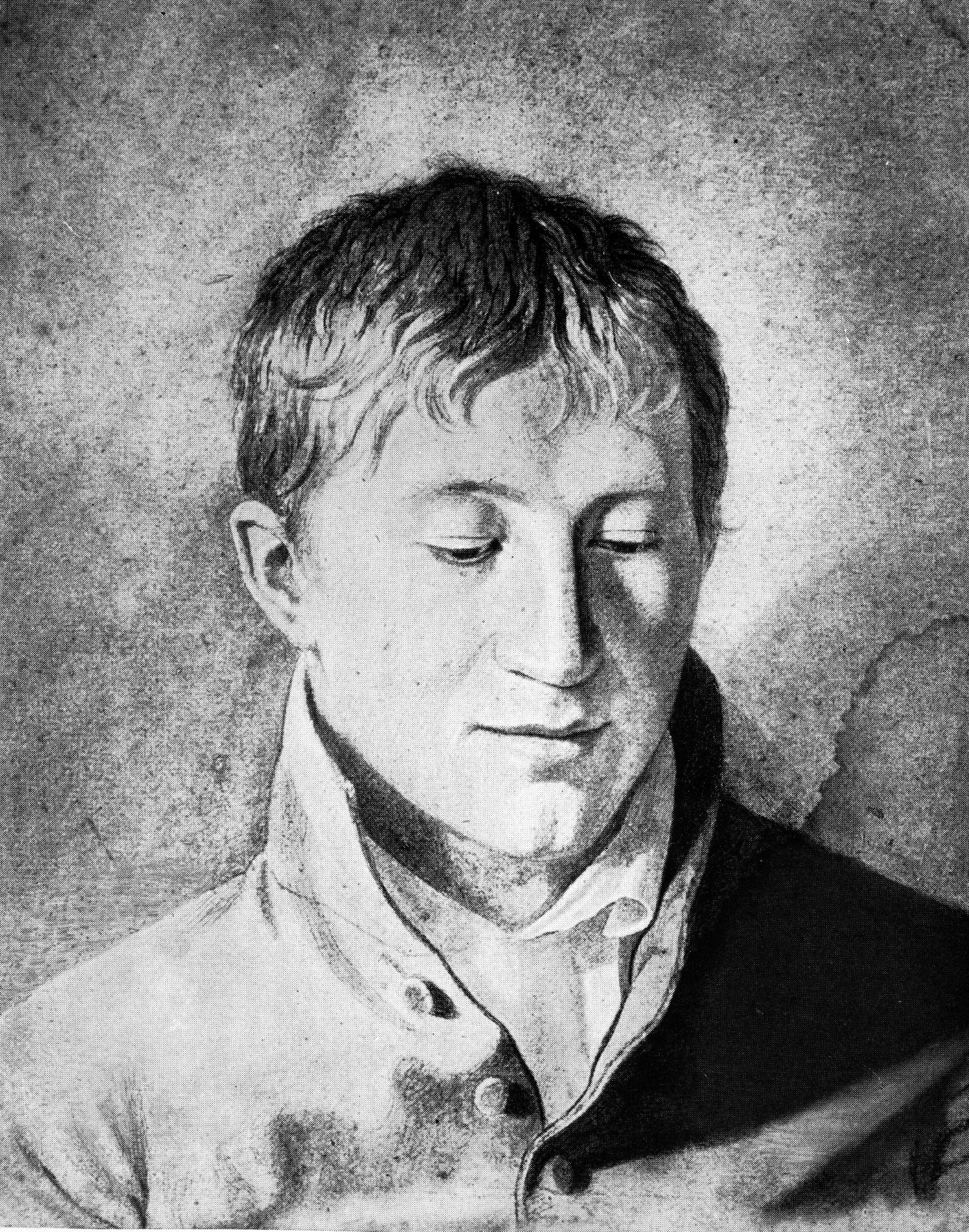

Karl Friedrich Friesen (25 September 1784 Magdeburg - 16 March 1814 La Lobbe, France) was a German gymnast and soldier, one of the principal promoters of gymnastics in Germany.

== Education ==
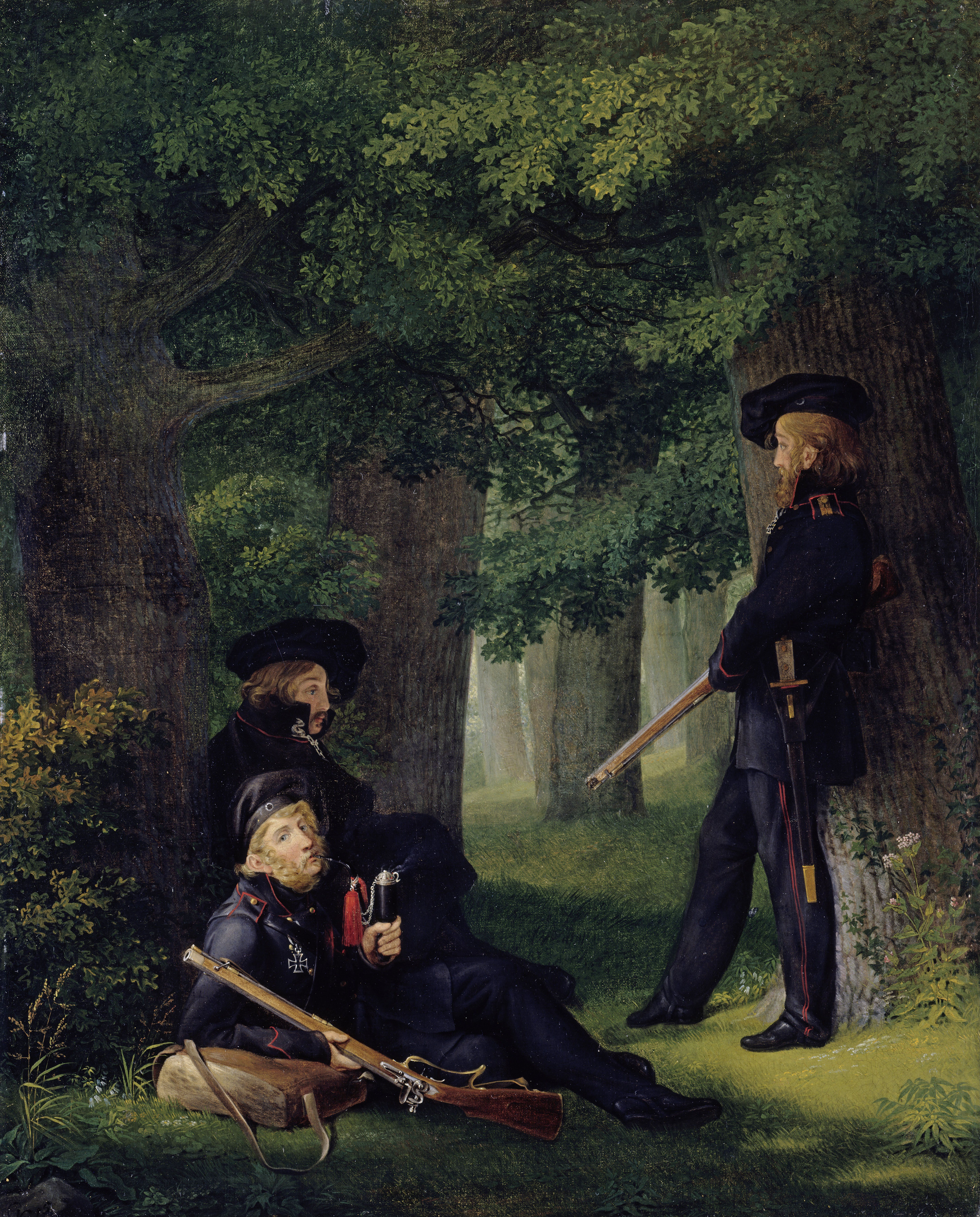
Heinrich Hartmann (lying, left) Theodor Körner (sitting, middle) and Friedrich Friesen (standing, right) at a forward post, by Georg Friedrich Kersting (1815). All three are wearing the uniform of the Jäger and the Iron Cross, 2nd Class.

He studied at the Academy of Architecture, Berlin, collaborated on the great atlas of Mexico edited by Humboldt, and from 1810 was an instructor in the Plamann Institute. In 1810-12 he rendered important services to Jahn in the establishment of German gymnastics.

== Career ==
=== War of the Sixth Coalition ===
Upon the outbreak of the German War of Liberation in 1813, he assisted in organizing the famous volunteer corps of Major von Lützow, whose adjutant he became. In mid-June 1813, the Lützow Freikorps was ambushed by Napoleonic troops near Kitzen due to a delay in an agreed troop withdrawal despite an armistice.

105 Lützowers fell, 90 were captured and 300 fled, including Lützow, Friesen and the seriously wounded Körner, who dragged himself to Großzschocher, about 11 km away. Various monuments in the region bear witness to these days.

== Death ==
After the dispersion of the corps by Napoleon at Rheims, he was captured and slain by French auxiliary troops from Lorraine near the village of La Lobbe, Ardennes on 15 March 1814. A long search for Friesen took place. In 1816, his friend August von Vietinghoff found the remains. In 1843, his remains were reburied in the Invalidenfriedhof in Berlin near the grave of Gerhard von Scharnhorst.

== Legacy ==
He has frequently been celebrated by German writers, in particular by E. M. Arndt in Es thront am Elbestrande.

“Friesen was a blossoming man in the fullness of youth and youthful beauty in body and soul, without flaw, full of innocence and wisdom, eloquent as a seer; a Siegfried figure, of great gifts and graces, who was loved by young and old; a master of the sword at cut and thrust, short, quick, firm, fine, powerful, and not tiring once his hand grasped the iron; a bold swimmer for whom no German river is too wide or too rapid; a horse rider fair in all saddles; a sinner in tower art, which owes a lot to him. He was not destined to return home to the free fatherland to which his soul clung. Because of his treachery, he fell in the Ardennes on a gloomy winter night by assassin shot. Even in battle no mortal blade would have cut him down. [...] But like Scharnhorst among the old, Friesen is the greatest of all those who remain among the young."

An athletic multisport competition was named in honour of him. The first Friesenkampf was held in Germany 1928. It consists of fencing, swimming, rifle shooting, running and shot put. In 2023, it was renamed to Klassischer Fünfkampf (in English: Classic Pentathlon).
