= Lützow's Wild Hunt (poem) =

Lützow's Wild Hunt (German: Lützows wilde verwegene Jagd) is a patriotic German song.

The poem was written by young German poet and soldier Theodor Körner, who served in the Lützow Free Corps during the Wars of Liberation. It was set to music by Ferdinand Ludwig Gehricke and became very popular.

The song praises the deeds of the Free Corps that became an essential part of Germany's national identity in the 19th century due to its famous members. Besides Körner, "Turnvater" Friedrich Ludwig Jahn, the famous poet Joseph von Eichendorff, the inventor of the kindergarten Friedrich Fröbel, and Eleonore Prochaska, a woman who had dressed as a man in order to join the fight against the French, served in the Corps.

Was glänzt dort im Walde im Sonnenschein?
Hör’s näher und näher brausen.
Es zieht sich herunter in düsteren Reihn
Und gellende Hörner schallen darein,
Erfüllen die Seele mit Grausen.
Und wenn ihr die schwarzen Gesellen fragt:
Das ist Lützows wilde, verwegene Jagd!

Was zieht dort rasch durch den finsteren Wald
Und streifet von Bergen zu Bergen?
Es legt sich in nächtlichen Hinterhalt,
Das Hurra jauchzt, die Büchse knallt,
Es fallen die fränkischen Schergen.
Und wenn ihr die schwarzen Jäger fragt
Das ist Lützows wilde, verwegene Jagd!

Wo die Reben dort glühen, dort braust der Rhein,
Der Wütrich geborgen sich meinte.
Da naht es schnell mit Gewitterschein
Und wirft sich mit rüstigen Armen hinein
Und springt an das Ufer der Feinde.
Und wenn ihr die schwarzen Schwimmer fragt:
Das ist Lützows wilde, verwegene Jagd!

Was braust dort im Tale die laute Schlacht,
Was schlagen die Schwerter zusammen?
Wildherzige Reiter schlagen die Schlacht,
Und der Funke der Freiheit ist glühend erwacht
Und lodert in blutigen Flammen.
Und wenn ihr die schwarzen Reiter fragt:
Das ist Lützows wilde, verwegene Jagd!

Was scheidet dort röchelnd vom Sonnenlicht
Unter winselnde Feinde gebettet?
Es zucket der Tod auf dem Angesicht,
Doch die wackeren Herzen erzittern nicht,
Das Vaterland ist ja gerettet!
Und wenn ihr die schwarzen Gefall’nen fragt:
Das ist Lützows wilde, verwegene Jagd.

Die wilde Jagd und die deutsche Jagd
Auf Henkersblut und Tyrannen!
D'rum, die ihr uns liebt, nicht geweint und geklagt!
Das Land ist ja frei, und der Morgen tagt,
Wenn wir's auch nur sterbend gewannen.
Und von Enkel zu Enkel sei es nachgesagt:
Das war Lützows wilde, verwegene Jagd.

Translation:

What glistens there in the forest sunshine?
Hear it roaring nearer and nearer.
It comes down this way in dark rows,
And blaring horns sound in it,
And fill the soul with terror.
And if you ask the black fellows:
That is Lützow's wild daredevil hunt.

What moves quickly there through the dark forest
And streaks from mountains to mountains?
It settles down for a night ambush,
The Hurrah rejoices and the gun bangs,
The French bloodhounds fall.
And if you ask the black hunters:
That is Lützow's wild daredevil hunt.

Where the grapes glisten there, there roars the Rhine,
The scoundrel thought himself hidden.
Then it approaches quickly, looking like a thunderstorm,
And throws itself in with vigorous arms,
And springs onto the enemy's riverbank.
And if you ask the black swimmers:
That is Lützow's wild daredevil hunt.

Why roars there in the valley the loud battle,
Why do the swords strike one another?
Wild-hearted riders attack the fight,
And the spark of freedom has awakened, glowing,
And smolders in bloody flames.
And if you ask the black riders:
That is Lützow's wild daredevil hunt.

What departs there, rattling, from the sunlight,
Put to bed among whimpering enemies?
Death twitches across the face;
Yet bold hearts do not waver,
For the fatherland is indeed saved!
And if you ask the black fallen ones:
That was Lützow's wild daredevil hunt.

The wild hunt, and the German hunt,
Upon hangmen’s blood and tyrants!
Therefore, those who love us, no weeping and lamenting;
For the land is free, and morning dawns,
Even if we only won this by dying!
And from grandchildren to grandchildren be it said:
That was Lützow's wild daredevil hunt.

The tune was adopted as the regimental march of the 1st Surrey Rifles, a Volunteer unit of the British Army.

== Bibliography ==
- Anon, A War Record of the 21st London Regiment (First Surrey Rifles), 1914–1919, 1927/Uckfield: Naval & Military, 2003, ISBN 1-843426-19-6.
