= Gadebusch =

Town in Mecklenburg-Vorpommern, Germany

- Town
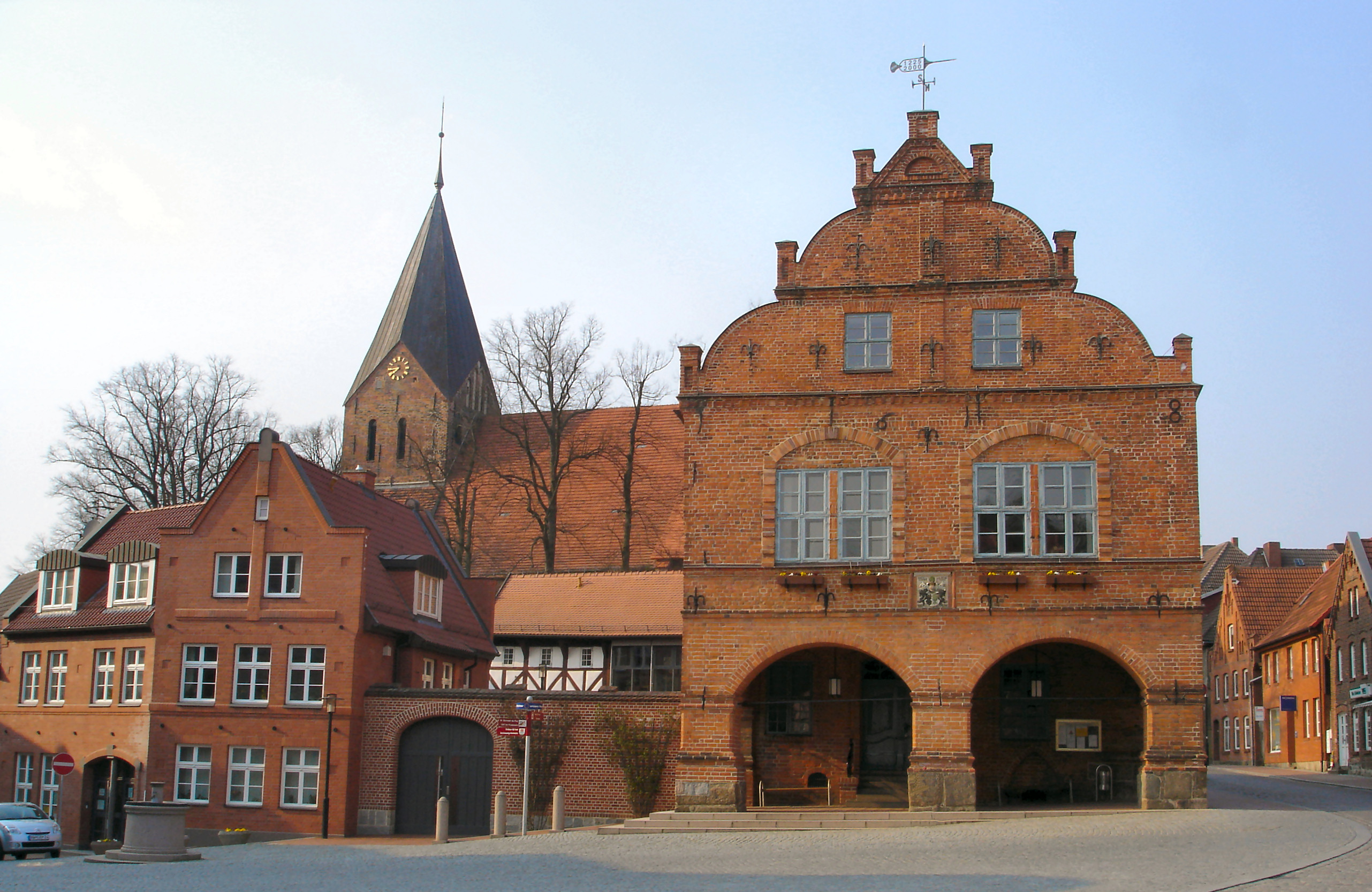
- Town hall and church

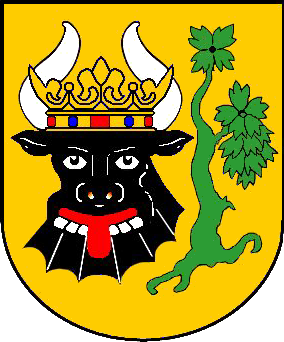
- Coat of arms

- Location of Gadebusch within Nordwestmecklenburg district
- Interactive map of Gadebusch
- Location within Germany Location within Mecklenburg-Vorpommern
- Coordinates: 53°42′N 11°07′E
- Country: Germany
- State: Mecklenburg-Vorpommern
- District: Nordwestmecklenburg
- Municipal assoc.: Gadebusch

Government
  - Mayor: Ulrich Howest

Area
  - Total: 47.75 km^{2} (18.44 sq mi)
- Elevation: 35 m (115 ft)

Population (2025-12-31)
  - Total: 5,189
  - Density: 108.7/km^{2} (281.5/sq mi)
- Time zone: UTC+01:00 (CET)
  - Summer (DST): UTC+02:00 (CEST)
- Postal codes: 19205
- Dialling codes: 03886
- Vehicle registration: NWM
- Website: www.gadebusch.de

Gadebusch (German pronunciation: [ˈɡaːdəbʊʃ]) is a town in Mecklenburg-Western Pomerania in the district of Nordwestmecklenburg. Halfway between Lübeck, Schwerin and Wismar, it is part of the Hamburg Metropolitan Region.

The town is known for two notable monuments: the Stadtkirche (City Church), built in 1220, considered the oldest brick church in Mecklenburg, and the Schloss (Castle), built in 1580–1583 in Northern Renaissance style.

Near the town is the site of the Battle of Gadebusch in 1712.

== Gadebusch municipality ==
Besides the old town of Gadebusch, the following settlements are incorporated with the Gadebusch municipality:

- Amtsbauhof
- An der Flöte
- Buchholz
- Dorf Ganzow
- Güstow
- Güstow Werder
- Hof Ganzow
- Jarmstorf
- Klein Hundorf
- Möllin
- Neu Bauhof
- Neu Güstow
- Reinhardtsdorf
- Stresdorf
- Wakenstädt

== Education ==
Gymnasium Gadebusch (high school)

== Notable people ==
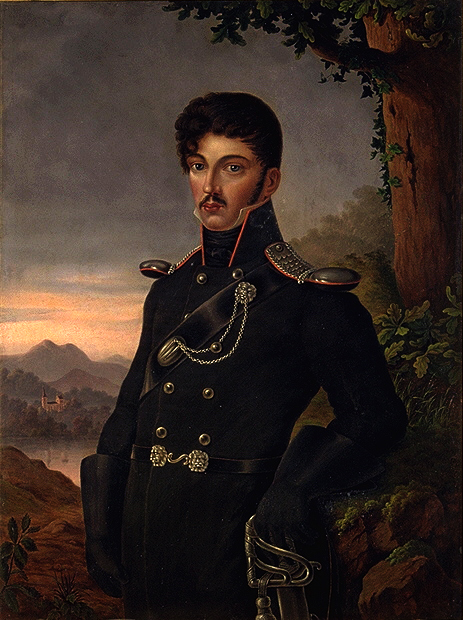
Theodor Körner in 1814 by Dora Stock

- Theodor Körner (1791–1813), author and freedom fighter, fallen in a forestry at Rosenow
- Agnes Karll (1868–1927), nursing reformer, is buried in the old Gadebuscher cemetery
- Wolf Biermann (born 1936), German songwriter, from 1953 to 1955 he attended the school with boarding school.
