= Elisa von Ahlefeldt =

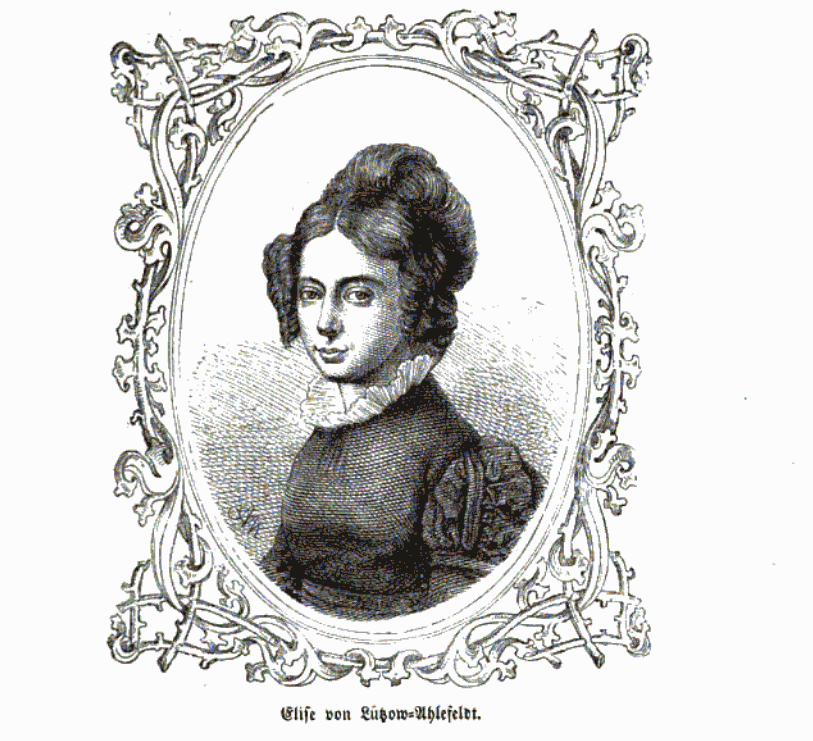
Elise von Ahlefeldt

Elisa Davidia Margarethe Countess of Ahlefeldt (born 17 November 1788 at Tranekjær Castle on Langeland Island, Denmark, died 20 March 1855 in Berlin) was a German-Danish noblewoman and wife of the Prussian General-major and war hero Adolf von Lützow (1782–1834).

== Early life ==
Elisa von Ahlefeldt was the only surviving child of Count Friedrich von Ahlefeldt-Laurvigen (1760-1832) and his first wife, Charlotte Louise von Hedemann (1762-1812).

== Biography ==
She enjoyed an excellent education, but had an unhappy childhood. Domestic disputes, mostly caused by the extravagance and excesses of the father, ended the parents' marriage. In 1806 she was morganatically married to Danish Crown Prince Christian (later Christian VIII) and bore a daughter in 1807. This short, happy marriage, which had been concluded against the will of the father, was concealed, and the child kept away from Denmark.

During a bathing trip to Bad Nenndorf with her mother, she met Prussian officer Ludwig Adolf Wilhelm von Lützow, who was cured there of a wound from Freischar Ferdinand von Schills while fighting against Napoleon. On 20 March 1810, she married him without her father's objection. The marriage was at first happy. When Lützow built his freikorps (Lützow Free Corps) in 1813, Elisa played a decisive part. She was enthusiastic about the advertising and equipment of the volunteers, accepted the reports in Breslau, and later devoted herself to the wounded. Theodor Körner, Friedrich Friesen and Petersdorff were among their most loyal friends. She was a close friend of Friedrich Friesen, and in 1843 she played a decisive role in commemorating the fact that he had been buried at the Berlin Old Garrison Cemetery 29 years after his death. In the fighting, she remained close to the corps, helping and nurturing (especially her often wounded husband).

=== Affair ===
In 1822, she met the young Karl Leberecht Immermann (1796-1840). Common literary and artistic inclinations triggered a love affair, which defined their life from the spring of 1822 for more than 17 years.

In 1824, Immermann was moved to Magdeburg to gain some distance. Elisa, however, separated from her husband, who had become a general and moved to Dresden. In 1825 her marriage with Lützow ended. She refused to marry Immermann, but followed him first to Magdeburg, then to Duesseldorf, and lived in a common household in a country house, the Collenbach estate on the Ratinger Chaussee in the nearby Derendorf (today Pempelfort), where she visited von Lützow in May 1829 after his new but unfortunate marriage with Auguste Uebel. From 1831 onward - with the permission of the Danish King - she reassumed her birth name. From 1827 to 1839, she supported Immermann's literary work after the beginnings of a joint translation of Walter Scott's Ivanhoe in Münster. It had a great influence on Immermann's poetical activity and gained great influence on his poetical work.

After Immermann's engagement with Marianne Niemeyer (1838), she left Düsseldorf and finally parted with him in August 1839. At the beginning of 1840 she moved to Berlin. She first lived with her friend Johanna Dieffenbach. She devoted herself to her new and old friends, and stayed with his wife and daughter after Immermann's early death. A long suffering ended her life.

== Salon ==
She formed a salon in Berlin in 1840 that continued to 1855, that was known as "Sundays". It gathered from 1840 to 1846 in Potsdamer Chaussee 38, from 1846 in the Schulgartenstraße 1a (today's Ebertstraße), and in the 1850s at Dessauer street 7.

This salon was visited by former members of Lützow's Freikorps and other family members of the divorced husband's family, to whom she stayed connected after her divorce.

It was common to communicate with other salons. Elisa Gräfin von Ahlefeld got in contact with those of Ludmilla Assing, Clara Mundt-Mühlbach, and Fanny Lewald and they visited each other.

Her guests included Rudolf von Auerswald (politician), Therese von Bacheracht (writer), Karl Isidor Beck (poet), Louis Blanc (painter), Edward von Bülow (writer), Peter von Cornelius, Johanna Dieffenbach, Katharina Dietz (her friend), Rudolf von Gottschall (writer), Alexander von Humboldt (naturalist), Karl Christoph von Kamptz (Prussian Minister of Justice), Adolf Friedrich von Krummacher (theologian), Gustav Kühne, Karoline Lauska, Fanny Lewald (writer, salon), Theodor Mundt (writer), Clara Mundt-Mühlbach (writer, salon), Henriette Paalzow (writer, salon), Emil Paleske (actor, writer) with wife, Leo Von Palm (general and companion Lützow), Betty Paoli (writer), Friedrich von Petersdorff (General and companion Lützow), Gustav von Pulitz (Lustspieldrektor), Christian Rauch (sculptor), Friedrich von Raumer (Professor for history), Max Ring, Hermann Sagert, Eduard Schnaase, Adolf Stahr, Henrik, Steffens, Theodor Stein, Ludwig Tieck, Karl August Varnhagen van Ense (writer), Wilhelm Wach (painter), Feodor Wehl (writer, poet), Wilhelm Zahn (professor).
