= Maria Johanna von Aachen =

German writer

- Born: Maria Johanna Katharina Erika Elisabeth von Amboten; 21 April 1755; Vechta
- Died: 21 January 1845 (aged 89); Münster

Maria Johanna von Aachen (born Maria Johanna Katharina Erika Elisabeth von Amboten; 21 April 1755 – 21 January 1845) was a Westphalian writer and noblewoman.

== Life ==
Maria Johanna Katharina Erika Elisabeth von Aachen was born in Vechta, a mid-sized strongly Catholic town in the flatlands between Osnabrück and Bremen. Her father, Majors Lewin Friedrich von Ambotten, served the archbishops of Münster. He originally hailed from the Kurland region, which has since become part of Latvia.

In 1777, she married Captain Klemens August von Aachen (1756-1808), a career soldier in the Prussian Army and, like herself, a writer. The marriage resulted in the birth of at least four children. From the time of her marriage, Maria Johanna wrote poetry. However, she did not consider herself a professional poet, and most of her published poems appeared under pseudonyms, with publication arranged by others. Maria Johanna died three months short of what would have been her ninetieth birthday. She was predeceased in 1808 by her husband and also by both her sons and one of her two recorded daughters. Consequently, her work is imbued with a certain spirit of melancholy.

She became a strong supporter of the newspaper producer and anthologist Friedrich Raßmann, and was a member of the literary circle around Elisa von Ahlefeldt and Elise Rüdiger. She is frequently mentioned in the published correspondence of Annette von Droste-Hülshoff. Some believe that the character of Mrs. von Austen in Droste-Hülshoff's one-act comedy "Perdu!" is a caricature of Maria Johanna von Aachen.

Maria Johanna von Aachen died in Münster on 21 January 1845, having spent more than the final three decades of her life as a widow.

== Select Bibliography ==
- Münstrische Monatsschrift 1785f., H. 1 und H. 3-11 [14 Ged., Pseud. J für Jeanette]
- Raßmann: Mimigardia 1811/1812 [5 Ged., Pseud. Maria]
- Raßmann: Taschenbuch für 1814 [1 Ged., Pseud. Maria]
- Grote/Raßmann: Thusnelda 1816 [4 Ged., Pseud. J]
- Raßmann: Sammlung triolettischer Spiele 1817 [3 Nachdr., Triolette]
- Hermann 1817 [1 Ged.] – Grote: Zeitlosen 1817 [4 Ged., Pseud. J.v.A.]
- Friedrich Philipp Wilmsen: Die Schönheit der Natur, geschildert von dt. Musterdichtern. Berlin 1817 [1 Ged.]
- Grote: Münsterländisches poetisches Taschenbuch 1818 [12 Ged.]
- Raßmann: Rhein.-Westf. Musenalmanach 1822 [3 Ged., Pseud. Heimchen]
- Rousseau: Westteutscher Musenalmanach 1823 [2 Ged.]
- Raßmann: Musenalmanach aus Rheinland und Westfalen 1823 [1 Ged., Pseud. Heimchen]
- Allg. Unterhaltungsblätter 1824-1835 [Ged.] – Rousseau: Göthes Ehrentempel 2, 1828 [2 Ged.]
- Coelestina 1838: Maria-Buchen. Eine Legende [Pseud. Johanna]
- Mindener Sonntagsbl. 1817, St. 21 [Ged.]
- Dresdner Abendztg. 1817, Nr. 133f., 245; Jg. 1818, Nr. 78, 107; Jg. 1823, Nr. 76 [Ged.]
- Schütz: Hausfreund 1820 [6 Ged.]
- Morgenbl. 1820, Nr. 1, 115, 131 [2 Ged., Charaden]
- Funcke: Rhein. Unterhaltungsbl. 1822, Nr. 48; Jg. 1823, Nr. 3 [Ged.]
- Unterhaltungsbl. für Stadt und Land 1836-1848 [mehrere Ged.]
