= Child Indicators Research =

- Subject: Well-being
- Language: English
- Edited by: Asher Ben-Arieh; Bong Joo Lee; Christine Hunner-Kreisel

Publication details
- History: 2008–present
- Publisher: Springer Science+Business Media
- Frequency: Bimonthly
- Impact factor: 2.420 (2020)

Standard abbreviations
- ISO 4: Child Indic. Res.

Indexing
- ISSN: 1874-897X (print); 1874-8988 (web)
- LCCN: 2008220485
- OCLC no.: 1056336242

Links
- Journal homepage; Online archive

Child Indicators Research is a bimonthly peer-reviewed scientific journal covering research on well-being in children. It was established in 2008 and is published by Springer Science+Business Media on behalf of the International Society for Child Indicators, of which it is the official journal. The editors-in-chief are Asher Ben-Arieh (Hebrew University of Jerusalem), Bong Joo Lee (Seoul National University), and Christine Hunner-Kreisel (University of Vechta). According to the Journal Citation Reports, the journal has a 2020 impact factor of 2.420.
