= Karl Immermann =

German dramatist, novelist and poet (1796–1840)

Karl Leberecht Immerman
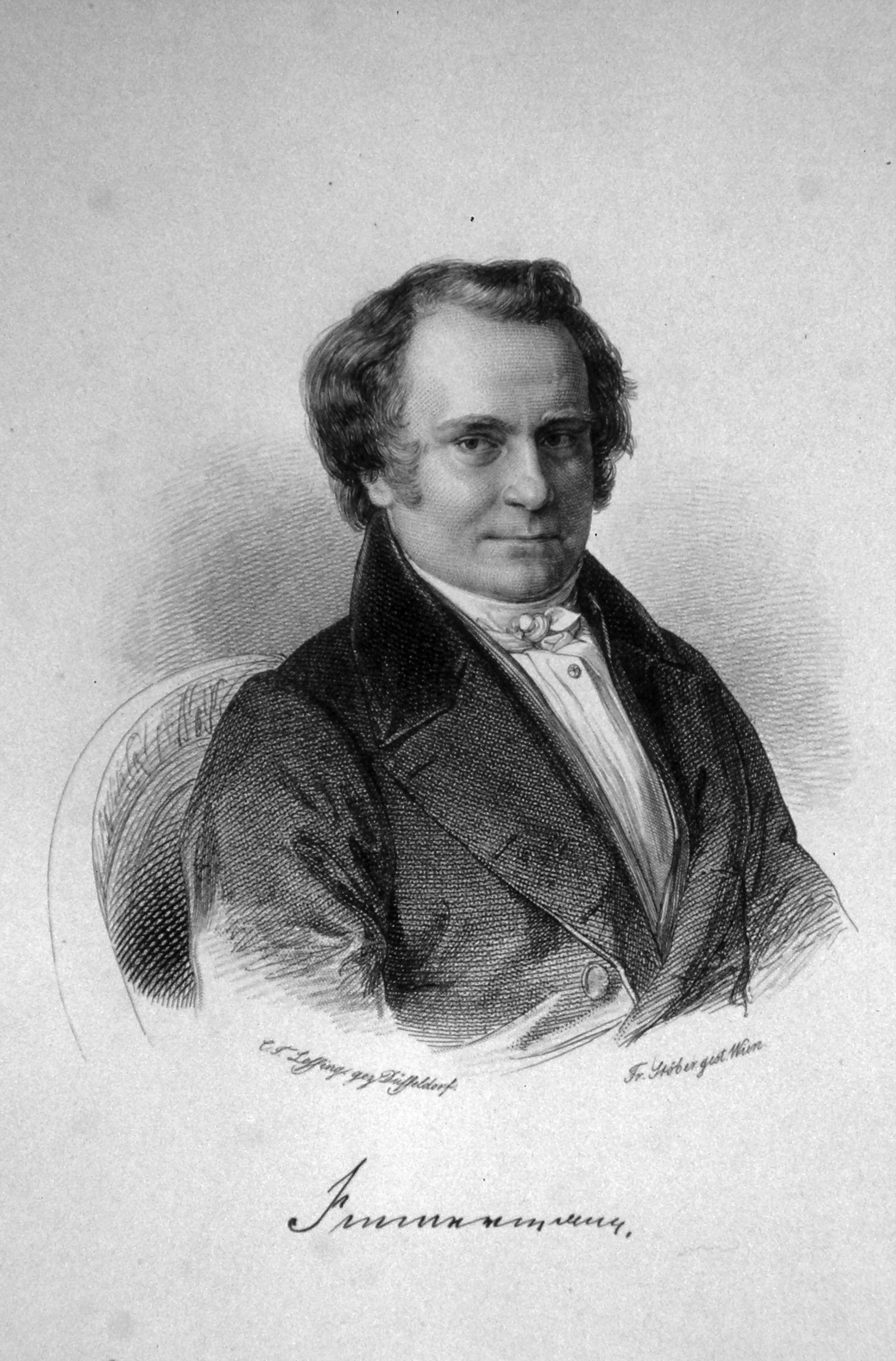
- Born: April 23, 1796; Magdeburg
- Died: August 25, 1840 (aged 44); Düsseldorf
- Education: Martin Luther University Halle-Wittenberg
- Occupations: Dramatist; Jurist; Novelist; Poet

Karl Leberecht Immermann (24 April 1796 – 25 August 1840) was a German dramatist, novelist and poet.

== Biography ==
He was born at Magdeburg, the son of a government official. In 1813 he went to study law at Halle, where he remained, after the suppression of the university by Napoleon in the same year, until Frederick William III of Prussia's "Summons to my people" on 17 March. Immermann responded quickly, but was prevented by illness from taking part in the earlier campaign; he fought, however, in 1815 at Ligny and Waterloo, and marched into Paris with Blücher.

At the conclusion of the war, he resumed his studies at Halle, and after being Referendar in Magdeburg, was appointed in 1819 Assessor at Münster in Westphalia. Here he became acquainted with Elise von Lützow, Countess von Ahlefeldt, wife of Ludwig Adolf Wilhelm Freiherr von Lützow. She inspired him to begin writing, and their relationship is reflected in several dramas written about this time.

In 1823, Immermann was appointed judge at Magdeburg, and in 1827 was transferred to Düsseldorf as Landgerichtsrat or district judge. The countess, whose marriage had in the meantime been dissolved, followed him, and, though refusing marriage, shared his home until 1839, when he married a granddaughter of August Hermann Niemeyer (1754–1828), chancellor and rector perpetuus of Halle University. In 1834 Immermann undertook the management of the Düsseldorf theatre, and, although his resources were small, succeeded for two years in raising it to a high level of excellence. The theatre, however, was insufficiently endowed to allow of him carrying on the work, and In 1836 he returned to his official duties and literary pursuits. He died at Düsseldorf.

Immermann had considerable aptitude for the drama, but it was long before he found a congenial field for his talents. His early plays are imitations, partly of Kotzebue's, partly of the Romantic dramas of Ludwig Tieck and Müller, and are now forgotten. In 1826, however, appeared Cardenio und Celinde, a love tragedy of more promise; this, as well as the earlier productions, awakened the ill-will of Count Platen, who made Immermann the subject of his wittiest satire, Der romantische Oedipus. Between 1827 and 1832 Immermann redeemed his good name by a series of historical tragedies, Das Trauerspiel in Tirol (1827), Kaiser Friedrich II. (1828) and a trilogy from Russian history, Alexis (1832). His masterpiece is the poetic mystery, Merlin (1831), a noble poem, which, like its model, Faust, deals with the deeper problems of modern spiritual life.

Immermann's important dramaturgic experiments in Düsseldorf are described in detail in Düsseldorfer Anfänge (1840). More significant is his position as a novelist. Here he clearly stands on the boundary line between Romanticism and modern literature; his Epigonen (1836) might be described as one of the last Romantic imitations of Goethe's Wilhelm Meister's Apprenticeship, while the satire and realism of his second novel, Münchhausen (1838), form a complete break with the older literature.

As a prose-writer Immermann is perhaps best remembered to-day by his story of village life, Der Oberhof, which is embedded in the formless mass of Münchhausen. His last work was an unfinished epic, Tristan und Isolde (1840).

Immermann's Gesammelte Schriften were published in 14 volumes in 1835–1843; a new edition, with biography and introduction by R. Boxberger, in 20 volumes (Berlin, 1883); selected works, edited by M. Koch, (4 volumes, 1887–1888) and Franz Muncker (6 volumes, 1897). See G. zu Putlitz, Karl Immermann, sein Leben und seine Werke (2 volumes, 1870); Ferdinand Freiligrath, Karl Immermann, Blätter der Erinnerung an ihn (1842); Wilhelm Müller, K. Immermann und sein Kreis (1860); R. Fellner, Geschichte einer deutschen Musterbühne (1888); K. Immermann: eine Gedächtnisschrift (1896).
