= Steve Pasek =

German Egyptologist (born 1975)

- Born: 7 May 1975; Bad Mergentheim, Germany
- Occupations: Egyptologist, Demotist, Historian, Classicist

Steve Pasek (born 7 May 1975 in Bad Mergentheim) is a German Egyptologist, Demotist, Historian and Classicist.

== Biography and education ==
Steve Pasek studied after attaining the college degree (Abitur) in Bad Mergentheim and completing the compulsory military service Ancient, Medieval, Early Modern and Modern History, Egyptology, Greek and Latin Philology (Classics), Assyriology, Indo-European Studies, Catholic Theology and Indology at the University of Würzburg. There he obtained the Magister Artium in Ancient History, Egyptology and Greek Philology with the thesis Griechenland und Ägypten von 404 bis 331 v. Chr.at the University of Würzburg. In 2005 he received a PhD in Egyptology with the thesis Hawara. Eine ägyptische Siedlung in hellenistischer Zeit, also at Würzburg. In 2012 he obtained a PhD in Ancient History with the dissertation Das Fünfkaiserjahr (193/194 n. Chr.) at the University of Marburg. In 2015 and 2016 he passed his exam for secondary school teachers (Staatsexamen) in History, Latin, Greek, German, English and Political Sciences at the University of Tubingen. There he obtained in 2015 his certificate (Philosophicum) in Philosophy. In 2020 he received his Master of Arts in Indoeuropean Studies at the University of Jena. Pasek has been working as a teacher at various schools in Germany since 2016.

== Academic career ==
From 2009 to 2012 Pasek was research assistant at the Chair of Biblical Theology: Exegesis of the New Testament in the Institute of Catholic Theology of the University of Vechta. In the Summer semester 2010 he served as lecturer in ancient history at the Seminary of History at the University of Osnabrück. During the Summersemester 2011 and the Wintersemester 2011/2012 he worked as Lecturer of Ancient History at the branch of Cultural and Regional History of the University of Vechta, where he took responsibility of the module Ancient History. He was furthermore from 2009 to 2012 Lecturer on Ancient Greek first in the optional domain languages and afterwards in the centre of languages of the University of Vechta. From 2011 to 2012 he served as well as a lecturer in Social Studies in the program for additional training of the physicians with emigrational background in the hospitals Cloppenburg, Emstek and Vechta.

== Publications ==
- Hawara. Eine ägyptische Siedlung in hellenistischer Zeit. 2 volumes (= Altertumswissenschaften / Archäologie vol. 2). Frank & Timme, Berlin 2007, ISBN 978-3-86596-092-4 Google Books.

Review: Eugene Cruz-Uribe, in: The Bulletin of the American Society of Papyrologists 47 (2010), S. 279-281, .

- Griechenland und Ägypten im Kontexte der vorderorientalischen Großmächte. Die Kontakte zwischen dem Pharaonenreich und der Ägäis vom 7. bis zum 4. Jahrhundert vor Christus (= Forum Alte Geschichte vol. 1). Meidenbauer, München 2011, ISBN 978-3-89975-744-6.
- Demotische und griechische Urkunden aus Hawara in Übersetzung (= Mathemata Demotika. vol. 1, ed. by Steve Pasek). Shaker Verlag, Aachen 2012, ISBN 978-3-8440-1049-7.
- Die wirtschaftlichen Grundlagen der Gottessiegler und Balsamierer zu Hawara. Der ökonomische Hintergrund eines priesterlichen Milieus im ägyptischen Fajum der Spätzeit und der hellenistischen Zeit. AVM, München 2012, ISBN 978-3-86924-364-1.
- Coniuratio ad principem occidendum faciendumque. Der erfolgreiche Staatsstreich gegen Commodus und die Regentschaft des Helvius Pertinax (192/193 n. Chr.). Beiträge zur Geschichte, AVM, München 2013, ISBN 978-3-86924-405-1.
- Imperator Caesar Didius Iulianus Augustus. Seine Regentschaft und die Usurpationen der Provinzstatthalter (193 n. Chr.). Beiträge zur Geschichte, AVM, München 2013, ISBN 978-3-86924-515-7.
- Bellum civile inter principes. Der Bürgerkrieg zwischen Septimius Severus und Pescennius Niger (193/194 n. Chr.). Beiträge zur Geschichte, AVM, München 2014, ISBN 978-3-86924-586-7.
- EPIKOROI. Die hellenischen Söldner zu Abydos. Beiträge zur Geschichte, AVM, München 2014, ISBN 978-3-86924-616-1, OCLC 896816532.
- Der Wohnraum und die Gräber der Gottessiegler und Balsamierer zu Hawara. Die Beschaffenheit und Zuordnung der Immobilien im Besitz eines priesterlichen Milieus im ägyptischen Fajum der hellenistischen Zeit. Beiträge zur Geschichte, AVM, München 2015, ISBN 978-3-86924-958-2, OCLC 922558599
- Pharao Amyrtaios und die Mittelmeerwelt: Die Beziehungen zwischen Ägypten, den Griechen und dem Achaimenidenreich im ausgehenden 5. und beginnenden 4. Jh. v. Chr. Beiträge zur Geschichte, AVM, München 2016, ISBN 978-3-86924-977-3, OCLC 944399114.
- Griechen in Ägypten während der Saitenzeit. Hellenische Söldner und Händler in Ägypten während des 7. und 6. Jh. v. Chr. Verlag Dr. Köster, Berlin 2018, ISBN 3-89574-943-5.
- Die Notare zu Hawara in der Spätzeit und der hellenistischen Zeit. Die einheimischen und griechischen Schreiber einer Siedlung im ägyptischen Fajum vom 4. bis 1. Jh. v. Chr. Verlag Dr. Köster, Berlin 2018, ISBN 3-89574-952-4.
- Das Münzwesen im vorhellenistischen Ägypten. Griechische und einheimische Münzen und ihre Verwendung im Ägypten des 7. bis 4. Jh. v. Chr. Verlag Dr. Köster, Berlin 2019, ISBN 978-3-89574-963-6.
- Die heiligen Tiere zu Hawara während der Spätzeit und der hellenistischen Zeit. Ihre Verehrung und ihre Kultdiener in einer ägyptischen Siedlung im Fajum vom 4. bis 1. Jh. v. Chr. Verlag Dr. Köster, Berlin 2020, ISBN 978-3-89574-984-1.
