= HOCH-N =

Germany ministry of education and research project

HOCH-N (sustainability at higher education institutions: develop – network – report) is a joint project funded by the BMBF (Federal Ministry of Education and Research) that promotes sustainable development in line with the Sustainable Development Goals (SDGs) at German higher education institutions. It conducts research in the fields of governance, sustainability reporting, teaching, research, transfer and operations (technical and non-technical administration). In October 2018, guidelines for action in the different fields of interest were launched that provide information on how to foster a sustainable development. HOCH-N is the largest network on the topic of sustainability at higher education institutions in Germany. The project was launched in November 2016 and got extended in 2018 for two more years. It received 2.5 million euros in public funding by the BMBF (Federal Ministry of Education and Research).

== Participating universities ==
Involved in the project's research are the higher education institutions Free University of Berlin, University of Bremen, Technical University Dresden, University of Duisburg-Essen, Eberswalde University for Sustainable Development, University of Hamburg, Leuphana University of Lüneburg, LMU Munich, University of Tübingen, University of Vechta and Hochschule Zittau/Görlitz.

== Origin ==
HOCHN was initiated by the BMBF as a result of the "LeNa" project. The "Guidelines for Sustainability Management in Non-University Research Organizations" were developed by the Fraunhofer, Helmholtz and Leibniz Associations. During its presentation at the 3rd symposium "Sustainability in Science" (SISI) 2016 in Berlin, the former Minister of Research Johanna Wanka announced the follow-up project HOCHN.

== Research ==
The project aggregates research in the fields of governance, sustainability reporting, teaching, research, transfer and operation (technical and non-technical administration). The findings, good practice examples and case studies are included into guidelines for sustainable development at higher education institutions. Their intention is to serve as an orientation in the development of a landscape of sustainable higher education in Germany.

== Project goals ==
In addition to the research, the project focuses on building a network for a sustainable higher education landscape. The first target was to include partners from 100 German higher education institutions. As of February 2020, around 250 people from 125 different institutions are involved.

== Results ==
The project results can be viewed online. For example, in the field of sustainability reporting the university-specific German Sustainability Code (HS-DNK) was presented on 15 May 2018. In addition, the eleven participating universities published individual guidelines as interim results in October 2018 on the fields of governance, sustainability reporting, teaching, research, operation and transfer.

Since December 2018, the individual fields of action, results, processes, project procedures, and visions for the future have been presented in the HOCH-N Podcast: Sustainability in series.

The HOCHN sustainability map provides an overview of all people and institutions that participate in the network.

== Events ==
An important component of the project is the organization of regular practical research workshops on the above-mentioned fields of action, which are open to all interested parties. Another event was the "1st NetworkDay" in September 2017, which was attended by around 200 international sustainability actors. In 2019, various HOCH-N-Hubs were held throughout Germany. The regional HOCH-N network hubs strengthen the exchange with regional networks and external multipliers from civil society, politics or businesses. The co-creation hubs (HOCH-N Perspective 2030) use creative methods to design innovative future scenarios, make alternative perspectives tangible and enhance inspiration. The target audience of the HOCH-N Hubs are university members and external multipliers that are involved in the field of sustainability. The first HOCH-N network hubs have been established in Pforzheim and Essen. In March 2020 the last planned, nationwide network hub in Germany will take place in Hamburg.

== Funding ==
The HOCH-N project is funded within the BMBF initiative "Sustainability in Science" (SISI), which is part of the program "Research for Sustainable Development" (FONA).
