= Vechta =

- Town
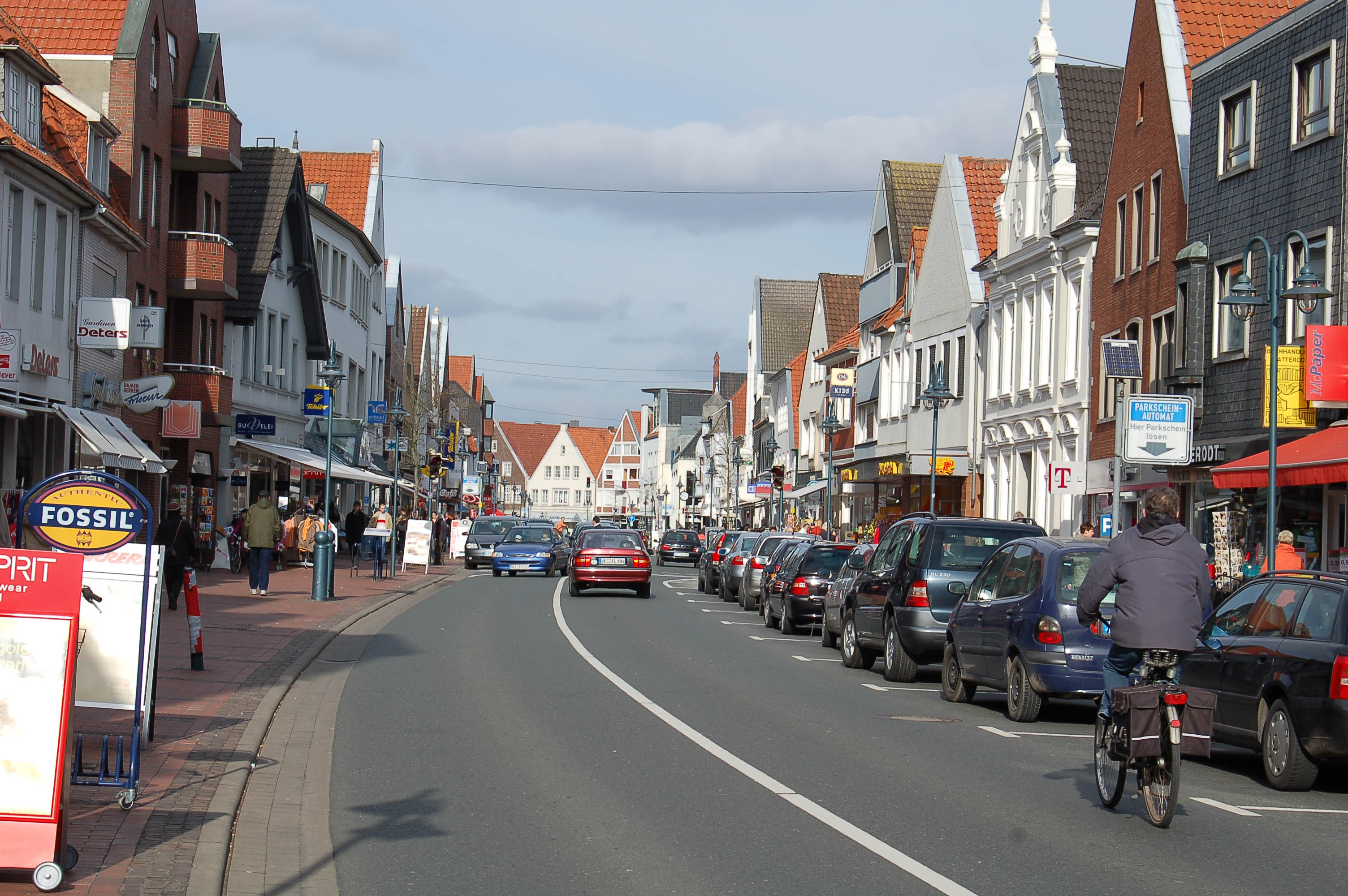

- Coat of arms

- Location of Vechta within Vechta district
- Interactive map of Vechta
- Location within Germany Location within Lower Saxony
- Coordinates: 52°43′50″N 08°17′19″E
- Country: Germany
- State: Lower Saxony
- District: Vechta
- Subdivisions: 15

Government
  - Mayor (2019–24): Kristian Kater (SPD)

Area
  - Total: 87.88 km^{2} (33.93 sq mi)
- Elevation: 37 m (121 ft)

Population (2025-12-31)
  - Total: 33,768
  - Density: 384.3/km^{2} (995.2/sq mi)
- Time zone: UTC+01:00 (CET)
  - Summer (DST): UTC+02:00 (CEST)
- Postal codes: 49377
- Dialling codes: 04441
- Vehicle registration: VEC
- Website: www.vechta.de

Vechta (German pronunciation: [ˈfɛçta]; Northern Low Saxon: Vechte) is the capital and largest city of the Vechta district in Lower Saxony, Germany. It is home to the University of Vechta.

It is known for the 'Stoppelmarkt' fair, which takes place every summer and has a history dating back to 1298. With an attendance of 800,000 visitors it is one of the biggest annual fairs in north-western Germany.

In the recent past, the town was known as a centre of far-northern German Catholicism.

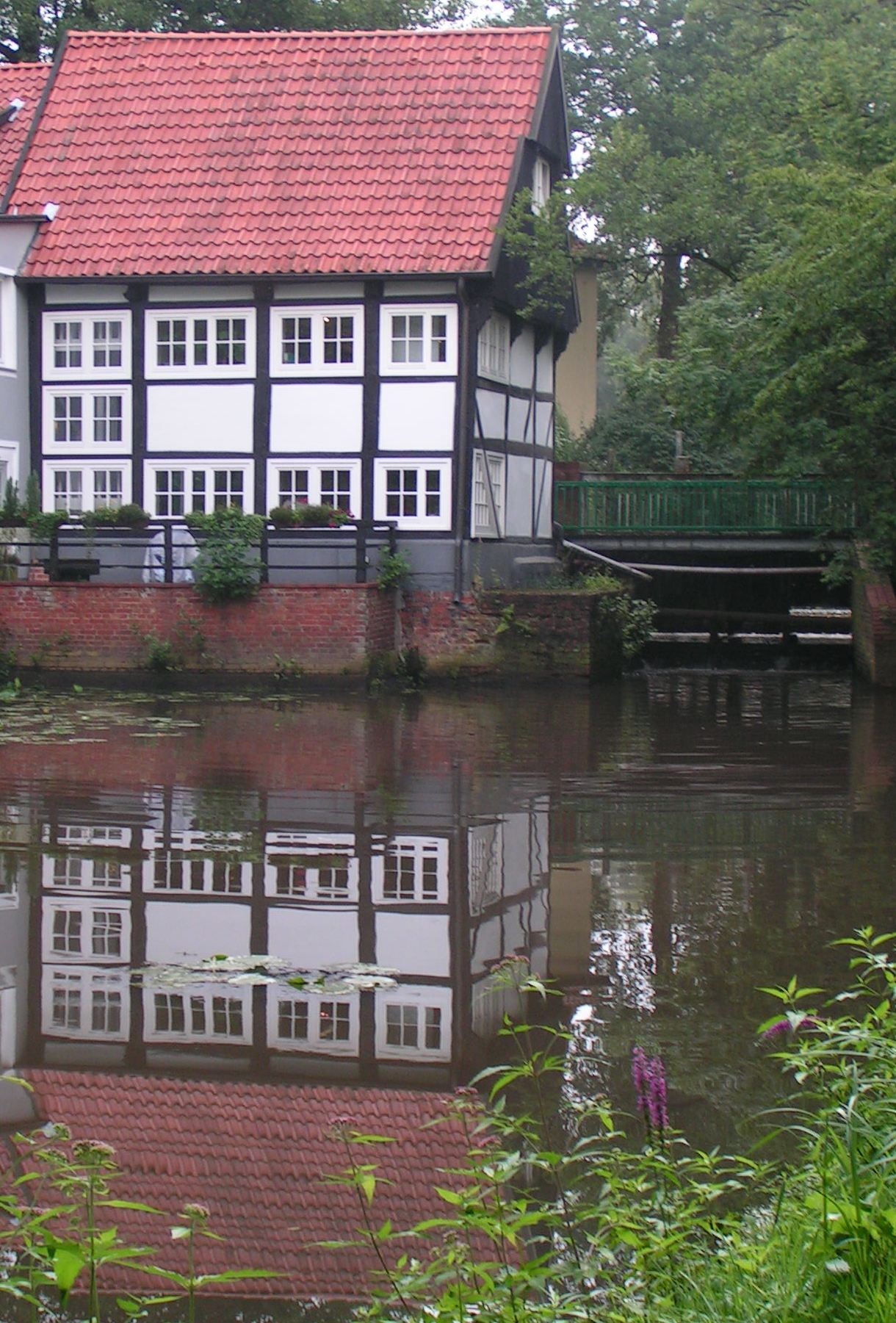
Vechta water mill

== Town subdivisions ==
Vechta consists of the following 15 boroughs.

- Vechta Stadt
- Bergstrup
- Calveslage
- Deindrup
- Hagen I
- Hagen II
- Holtrup
- Holzhausen
- Langförden
- Oythe
- Spreda
- Stoppelmarkt
- Stukenborg
- Telbrake
- Vardel

== Transport and infrastructure ==
The A1, also known as the Hansalinie, passes by Vechta. There are three interchanges: Vechta-West/Bakum, Vechta-Langförden/Emstek, Vechta-Nord/Ahlhorn. Also, the B69 runs through the city of Vechta.

=== Transport ===
Vechta lies on the Delmenhorst-Hesepe railway and offers connections to Osnabrück and Bremen.

== Population development ==
Vechta is one of the rare German towns that still has a growing population.

In addition, Vechta with nearby Cloppenburg have both the highest fertility rates and lowest median ages in Germany, due to the large Catholic population.

- 1890: 2,188 inhabitants
- 1905: 3,895 inhabitants
- 1910: 4,373 inhabitants
- 1933: 7,280 inhabitants
- 1939: 8,095 inhabitants
- 1950: 13,097 inhabitants
- 1977: 22,133 inhabitants
- 1980: 23,000 inhabitants
- 1990: 23,200 inhabitants
- 1995: 25,616 inhabitants
- 2000: 27,832 inhabitants
- 2005: 30,061 inhabitants
- 2008: 30,903 inhabitants
- 2009: 31,250 inhabitants
- 2021: 32,900 inhabitants

== Theatre ==
Vechta is a fixed venue for the Landesbühne Niedersachsen Nord, founded in 1952. The headquarter is located in Wilhelmshaven, which stages annually up to ten performances at the Metropoltheater. The theatre offers 272 seats.

== Stoppelmarkt ==
Stoppelmarkt was first mentioned as a market in 1298. In earlier times, it was held in the streets of the city within the fortress walls. Even then, merchants from many European countries came to Vechta. In 1577 the city of Vechta was hit by the plague. Therefore, the market had to be moved to an open field outside the city walls. Since the stubble remains of the last harvest were still standing on the field, the market was henceforth called Stoppelmarkt. In 2020 and 2021 the market was cancelled because of the COVID-19 pandemic.

== Climate ==
The climate in Vechta is a moderate sea climate, influenced by wet northwest winds from the North Sea. The long term average air temperature reaches 8.5 to 9.0 °C and about 700 millimeters of rainfall per year. Between May and August, an average of 20–25 summer days (climatological term for days with the maximum temperature exceeds 25 °C) are calculated.

== Twin towns – sister cities ==
Vechta is twinned with:

- Le Cellier, France
- Jászberény, Hungary
- Saint-Pol-de-Léon, France

== Sport ==
Vechta is the home of the Rasta Vechta basketball club, which plays in the German Basketball Bundesliga.

The Reiterwaldstadion, a motorcycle speedway, Long Track is located in the south of the city, off the Kiefernweg. It has hosted important speedway events such as the 2025 FIM Long Track of Nations (the team world championship).

== Notable people ==
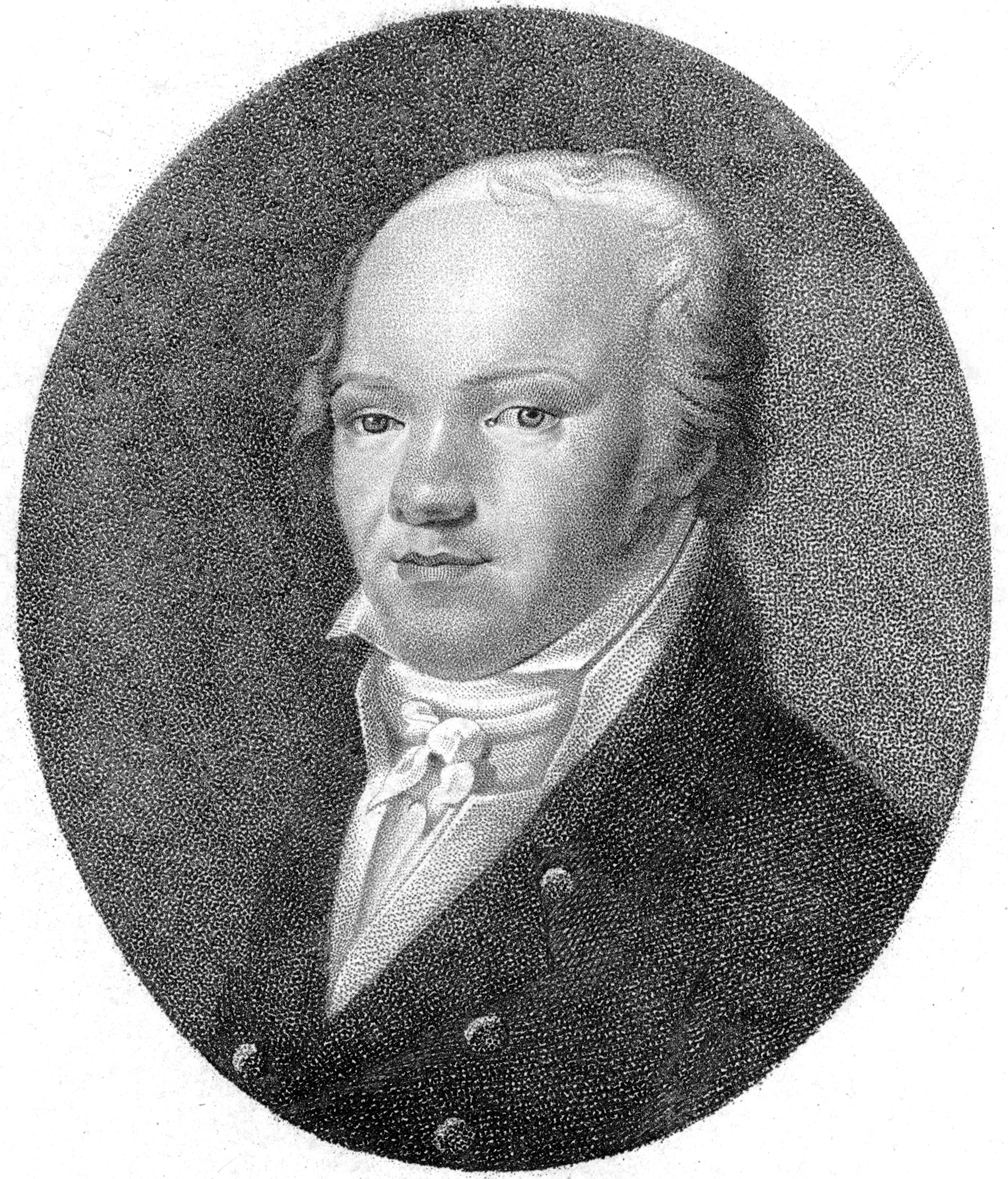
Andreas Romberg

- Conrad of Vechta (ca 1370 - 1431), Bishop of Verden (1400–1402/1407), Bishop of Olomouc (1408–1413), Archbishop of Prague (1413–1421) and Chancellor of the Kingdom of Bohemia, (1405–1412).
- Maria Johanna von Aachen (1755–1845), a Westphalian writer and noblewoman
- Andreas Romberg (1767–1821), composer and violin player
- Rolf Dieter Brinkmann (1940–1975), writer of poems, short stories, essays, letters and diaries.
- Martin Welzel (born 1972), musician, associate organist at Munich Cathedral 2021–2022
- Katja Suding (born 1975), politician (FDP), member of the Bundestag from 2017 to 2021.
- Alexander Bartz (born 1984), politician (SPD), member of the Bundestag since November 2022
- Dr.Jens Hilgenberg (born 1958) senior consultant 1996- 2006 and 2006-2026 chief physician (2006) Dept. of Orthopaedics, Hand & Trauma Surgery.

=== Sport ===
- Ansgar Brinkmann (born 1969), footballer, played 426 games
- Alparslan Erdem (born 1988), footballer, played over 200 games
- Luc Van Slooten (born 2002), a professional basketball player

== See also ==
- University of Vechta
