= August Lewald =

German author

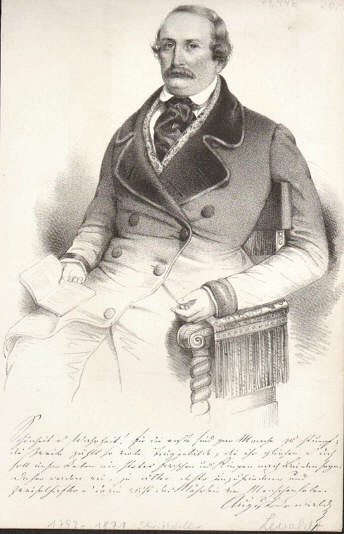
August Lewald

August Lewald (14 October 1792 in Königsberg – 10 March 1871 in Baden-Baden) was a German author.

== Biography ==
Lewald was born at Königsberg. He entered the Russian service at Warsaw, as secretary, during the War of Liberation. He became an actor, and after 1818 he was manager and director of theatres at Hamburg, Stuttgart, and elsewhere. In 1835, he founded the periodical Europa at Stuttgart, and afterwards became editor of the conservative Deutsche Chronik. A collection of his works, made by himself, was published in twelve volumes (1844–45), including the autobiographical Aquarelle aus dem Leben (1836–37 and 1840).

== Family ==
He was a cousin of writer Fanny Lewald whose first novel appeared in the pages of Europa.
