= Miernicza Street =

Street in Wrocław, Poland

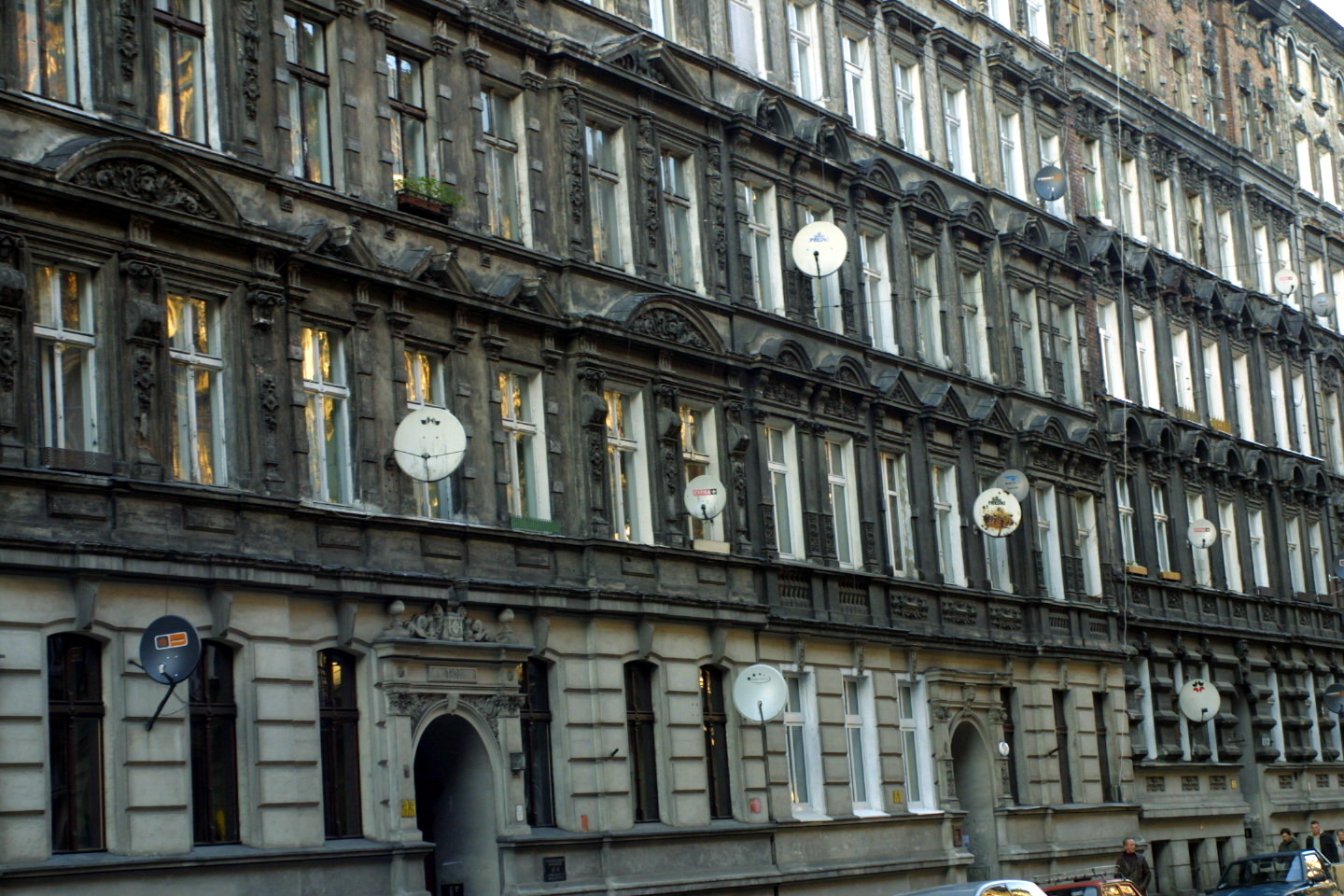
Typical Miernicza block of flats

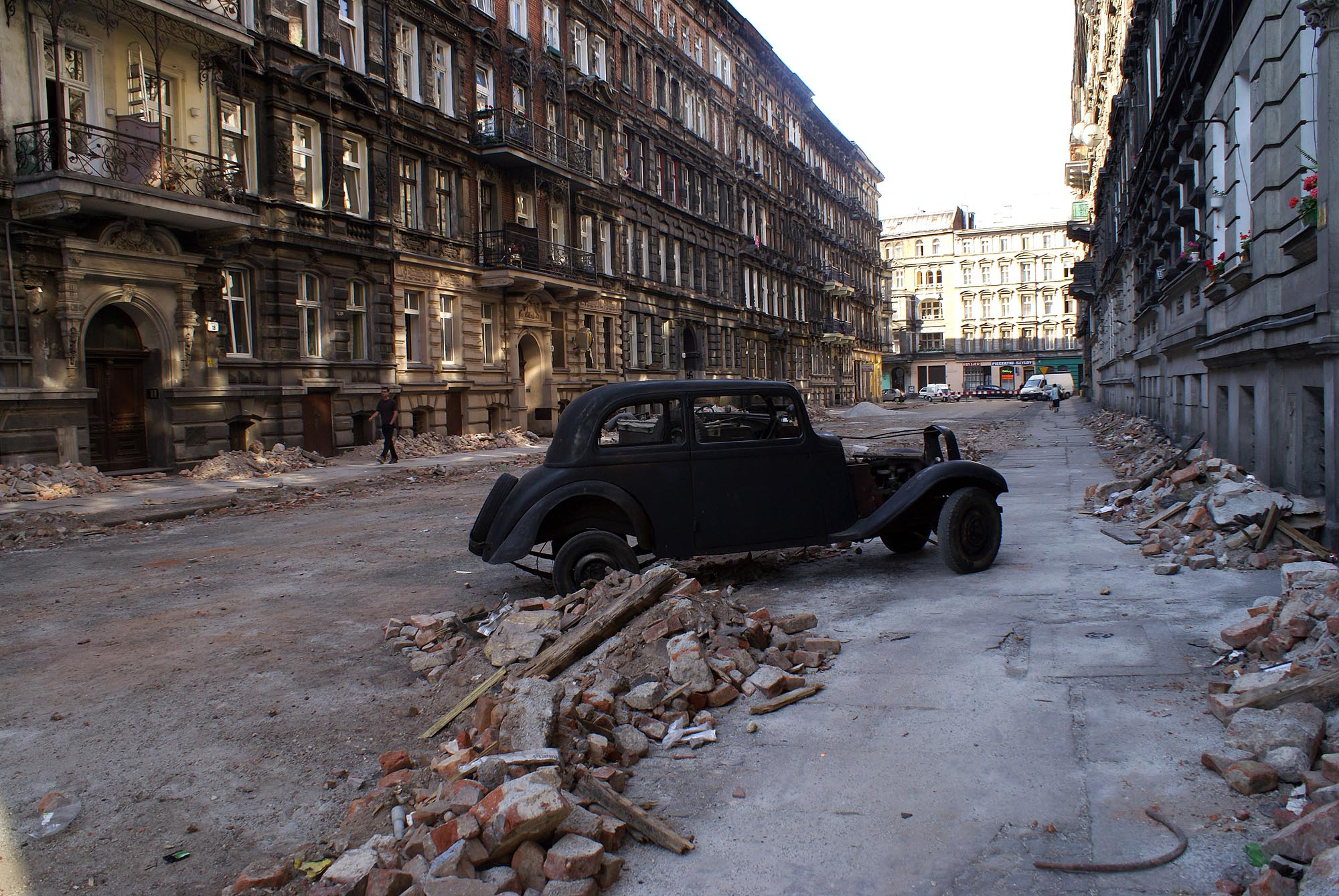
WWII movie scenery

Miernicza Street, formerly Lützowstraße (for Ludwig Adolf Wilhelm von Lützow), is a street in Wrocław, Poland. The Polish name is related to surveying. Many films were filmed there including Bridge of Spies by Steven Spielberg, A Woman in Berlin, Avalon, Aimée & Jaguar. Character. The street was traced in 1886. The street is neglected, situated in the infamous Bermuda Triangle district.
