= Adolf Stahr =

German writer

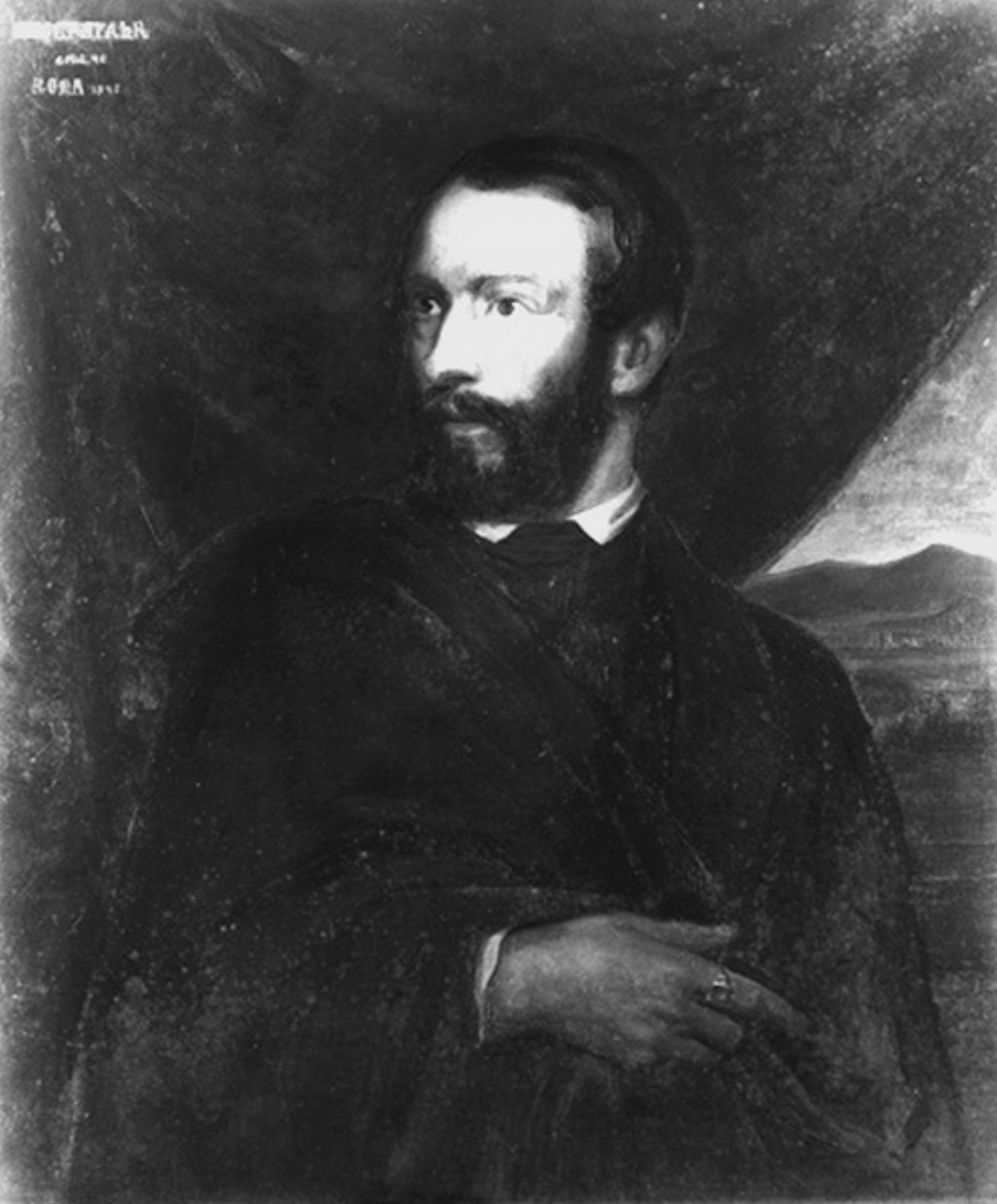
Adolf Wilhelm Theodor Stahr.

Adolf Wilhelm Theodor Stahr (German pronunciation: [ˈaːdɔlf ˈvɪlhɛlm ˈteːodoːɐ̯ ˈʃtaːɐ̯]; 22 October 1805 – 3 October 1876) was a German writer and literary historian.

== Life ==
Stahr was the son of the preacher and pastor Johann Adam Stahr (1768–1839). He attended grammar school in Prenzlau. In 1825 at the request of the parents he went to Halle to study theology, but soon changed because of his enthusiasm for the classics, and studied philology. After graduating, he taught for ten years at the Royal Pädagogium in Halle. In 1834 he married the preacher's daughter Marie Krätz. The marriage produced five children, three boys (Alwin, Adolf and Edo) and two girls (Anna and Helene).

In 1836, he became Vice Chancellor and Professor at the Gymnasium in Oldenburg. A collection of critical work on the Theatre appeared in 1845 (Oldenburg theater review, 2 vols).

In 1845, Stahr and made a long journey through Italy, Switzerland and France, where he met Heinrich Heine. At the end of 1845 in Rome, he met the writer Fanny Lewald. This kindled a passionate relationship, and in the following years they both made several trips, wrote and worked together. In 1852 Stahr retired and moved to Berlin. In 1855 he married Fanny Lewald. He dedicated himself to continuing his varied literary works.

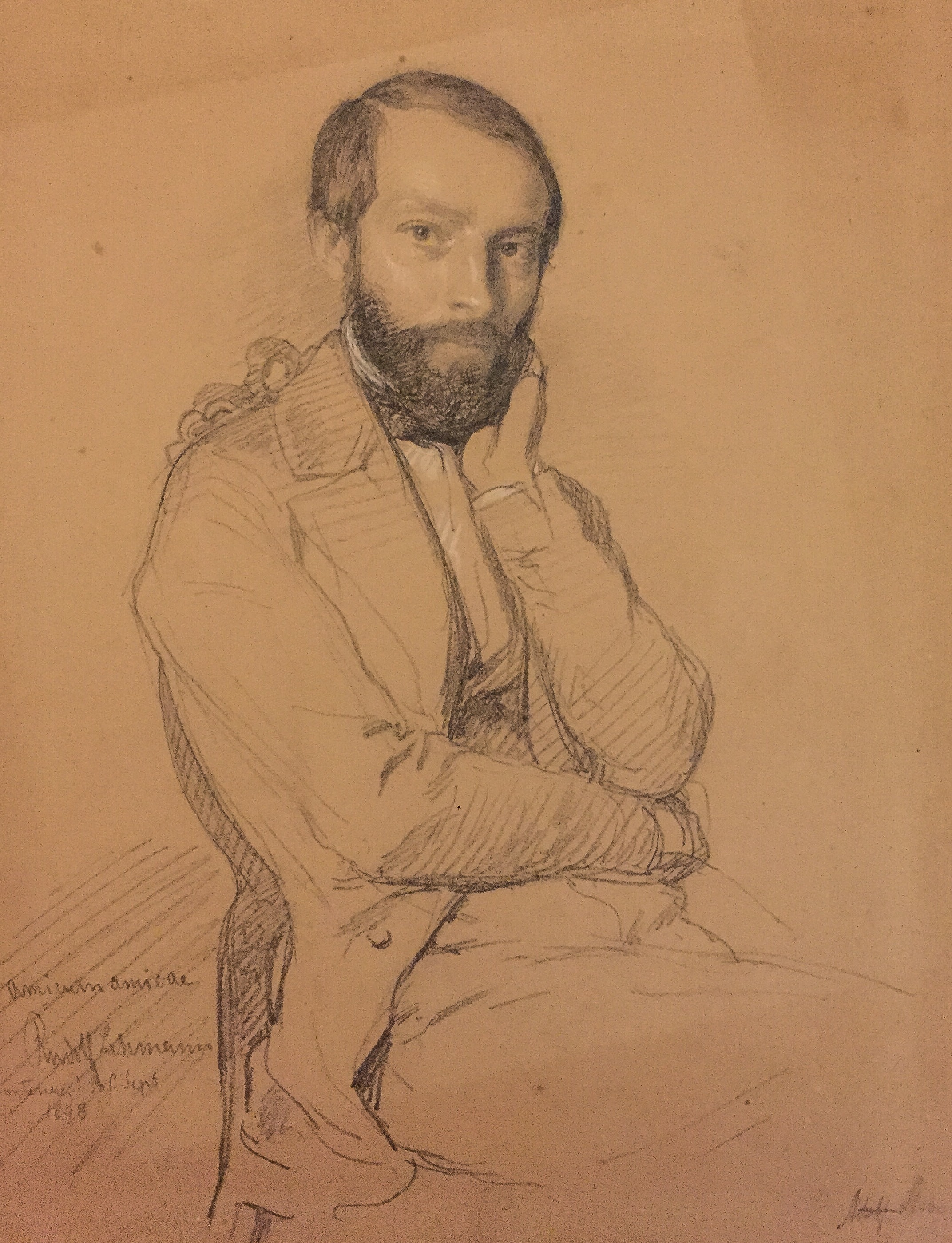
Adolf Stahr (1848)

In 1849 he published a three volume novel The Republicans which appeared in Naples, 1849–50, followed by a work about the Revolution of 1848 in Prussia (The Prussian Revolution, 2 vols), plus several travel books, art-historical works (Torso. art, the artists and artworks Old, 2 vols 1854/55), translations of Aristotle, and biographical works on the literary historian Gotthold Ephraim Lessing (GE Lessing. His life and his works, 1859, 2 vols) and Goethe (Goethe's female characters, 1865–68, 2 vols). Stahr's final years were marked by illness and a growing resignation. In 1875, he suffered a severe bout of pneumonia and died a year later in Wiesbaden.

== Works ==
- Ein Jahr in Italien, (A year in Italy), 3 vols, 1847–50
- Zwei Monate in Paris (Two months in Paris), 2 vols, 1851
- Weimar und Jena, Ein Tagebuch, (A diary), 2 vols 1852
- Nach fünf Jahren. (After five years of age). Pariser Studien aus dem Jahre 1855, 2 Bde. 1857 Parisian studies dating back to 1855, 2 Vols 1857
- Herodian 's Geschichte des römischen Kaiserthums seit Marc Aurel. (Herodian's History of the Roman Emperors since Marcus Aurelius). Stuttgart: Hoffmann 1858.
- Herbstmonate in Italien, (Autumn months in Italy), 1860
- Ein Winter in Rom, (A winter in Rome), 1860 (together with Fanny Lewald)
- Aus der Jugendzeit, (On youth), 2 vols 1870-77
- Ludwig Geiger (Hg.): Aus Adolf Stahrs Nachlaß. Ludwig Geiger (ed.): From Adolf Stahr correspondence.
