= Henriette Paalzow =

German novelist

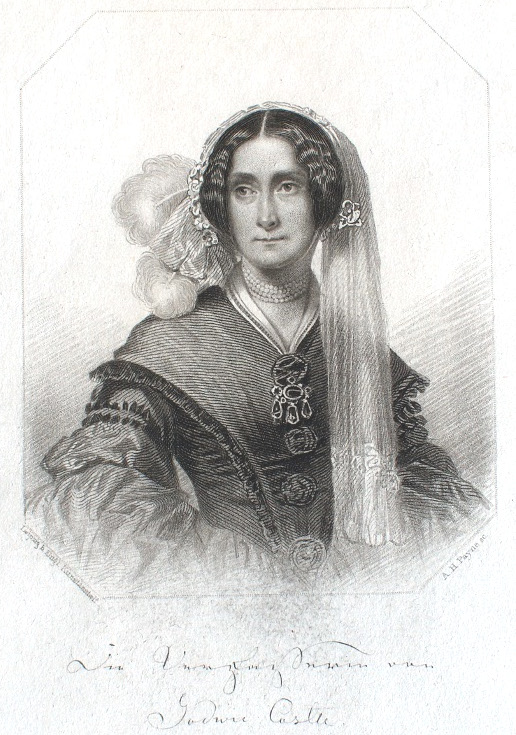
Henriette Paalzow, 1840

Henriette von Paalzow, née Wach (1788, in Berlin – 30 October 1847, in Berlin) was a German historical novelist.

Henriette Wach was the sister of the painter Karl Wilhelm Wach. She married a Prussian officer, Major Paalzow, in 1816, though the marriage was dissolved in 1821. Her historical novels were compared to those of Walter Scott.

== Works ==
- (anon.) Godwie-Castle, 3 vols, 1838
- St. Roche, 3 vols, 1839. Translated into English by James Justinian Morier as St. Roche. A romance, from the German, 1847
- Thomas Thurnau, 3 vols, 1843. Translated into English by Mary Howitt as The citizen of Prage, 1846.
- Jakob van der Rees, 1844
