= Reiterwaldstadion =

Stadium in Vechta, Germany

- Interactive map of Reiterwaldstadion
- Location: 49377 Vechta, Germany
- Coordinates: 52°42′39″N 8°17′22″E
- Capacity: 15,000
- Field size: 535 metres track

Tenants
- Motorcycle speedway Association football

The Reiterwaldstadion is a motorcycle speedway, Long Track and association football stadium located in the south of the city, off the Kiefernweg.

The venue can accommodate up to 15,000 spectators and hosts the Automobil Club AC Vechta. Additionally, it is used by the SC SF Niedersachsen Vechta 1921 football club.

== History ==
The stadium hosted the final of the 2019 FIM Long Track of Nations and the final of the 2025 FIM Long Track of Nations (the team world championship).
