= Fanny Lewald =

German novelist and feminist (1811–1889)

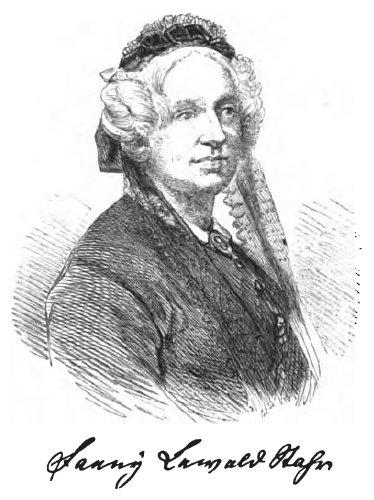
- Born: 24 March 1811; Königsberg, East Prussia
- Died: 5 August 1889 (aged 78); Dresden, German Empire
- Other name: Fanny Lewald Stahr
- Occupations: Novelist; essayist; activist
- Spouse: Adolf Stahr

Fanny Lewald (24 March 1811 – 5 August 1889) was a German novelist and essayist and a women's rights activist.

== Life and career ==
Fanny Lewald was born at Königsberg in East Prussia in 1811 to a bourgeois, Jewish family. Her father, David Markus (later Lewald) was a wine merchant. Lewald's father was unusual in the attention he gave his children, he stood in contrast to his peers in Georgian and Victorian society—who delegated childcare to nannies and their education to "public" schools, tutors, and governesses. Markus gave Lewald the best education available to girls in East Prussia and supervised further education at home. Her formal schooling began at the Ulrich School, unfortunately the school closed then Lewald was fifteen. Without any secondary education available to her, Lewald was forced to stay home and perform household chores. During this time her father set up a rigid schedule that included education in the home for her.

At a family outing she met a young theological student name Leopold Bock. They intended to marry, however, her betrothed died before the wedding took place. Lewald was permitted to convert to Christianity after Leopold's death, however due to her pragmatic nature and her father's rationalistic philosophy she was unable to accept any religion wholeheartedly—especially one that relied on more faith than reason. Her religious beliefs were likely a form of deism.

In 1832, Markus took Lewald with him on an extended business trip through Germany. They stayed in Berlin and Baden-Baden for several weeks. During this time Lewald met important political figures through her uncle, Friedrich Jacob Lewald. Her time with her uncle was her first real exposure to the outside political world of Prussia.

Returning to Königsberg after a year's absence, Lewald found her mother in poor health. Lewald and her sisters took turns managing the household during this time. Her father refused to let Lewald take a paid position as a governess or a companion as he thought it would reflect poorly on his ability to provide for his family. With not much else to do, Lewald conducted large amounts of correspondence. Her cousin August Lewald, editor of the Stuttgart periodical Europa, published one of her letters about the Mucker trail as an essay.

In 1841 she published her first novel in her cousin August Lewald's periodical Europa, under the title Der Stellvertreter.

Her first two novels, Clementine and Jenny were published anonymously in accordance with her father's wishes.

After her mother's death she was released from her household duties, Lewald moved into an apartment in Berlin near her brother Otto. In 1845 she went abroad for the first time without being accompanied by relatives to Italy. In Rome she became acquainted with a group of German intellectual women, including Adele Schopenhauer and Ottilie von Goethe. This trip was where she would meet her future husband, Adolf Stahr. At the time of their meeting, Stahr was married with five children. They would not be able to get married till after his divorce in 1855.

Lewald first received attention for her writing after the publication of a letter she wrote about a court trial she had attended. Lewald's cousin, August Lewald, published the letter in the Stuttgart periodical, Europa, which he edited. August then asked Fanny to write a report on the coronation of King Frederick William IV in Konigsberg in 1840. Fanny Lewald went on to become a prolific writer and publish many successful novels. Her writing often drew from her experience growing up female in a bourgeois family, advocating for better education for women and criticizing marriages of convenience.

In 1876, after Stahr's death, she moved to Dresden, where she engaged in literary work until her death on 5 August 1889.

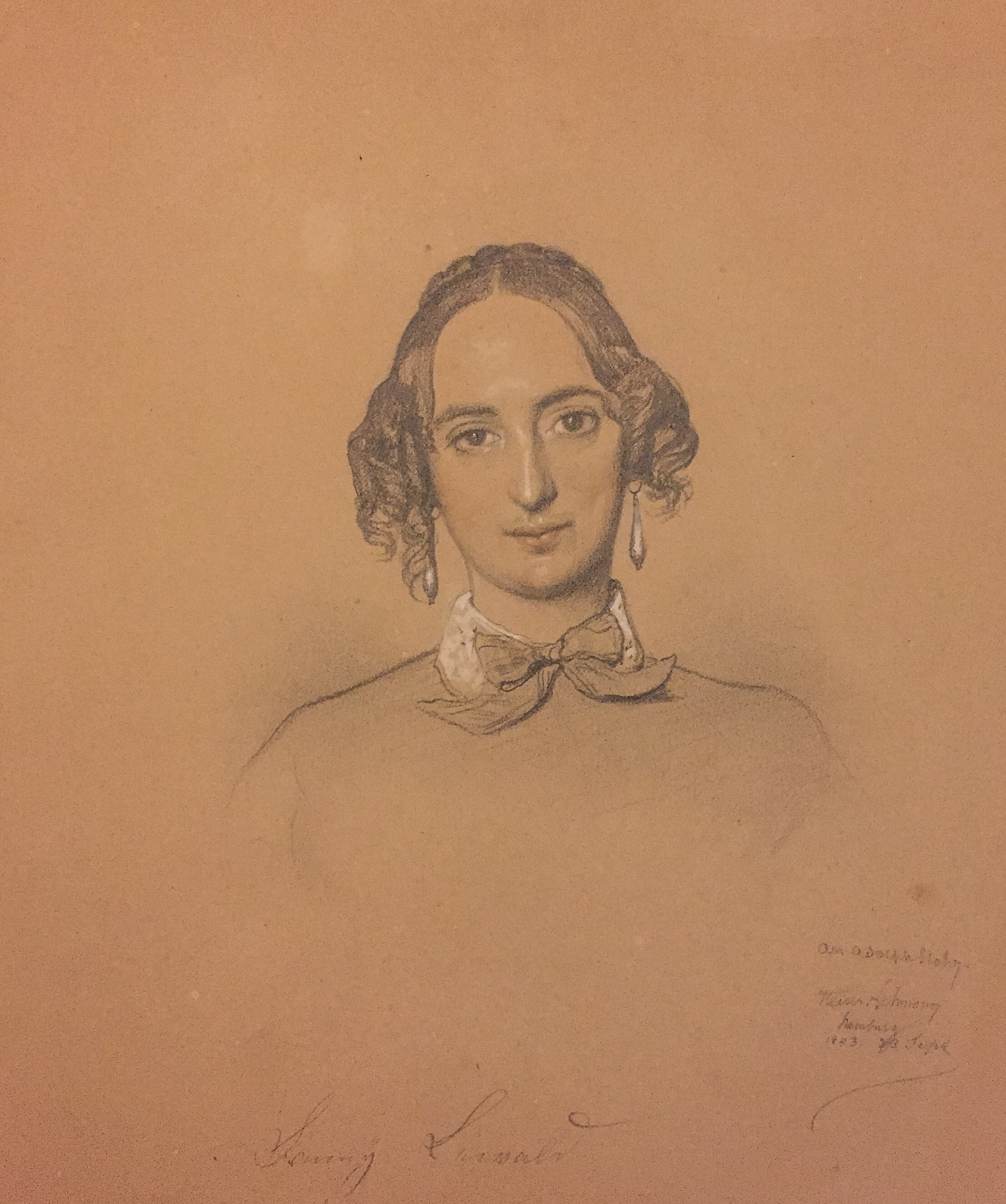
Fanny Lewald (1848)

== Published works ==
Fanny Lewald's published works as cited by The Political Woman in Print

- Clementine (1843)
- Jenny (1843)
- Prinz Louis Ferdinand (1849; 2nd ed., 1859)
- Das Mädchen von Hela (1860)
- Von Geschlecht zu Geschlecht (8 vols, 1863–1865)
- Nella (1870)
- Die Erlöserin (1873)
- Benvenuto (1875)
- Stella (1883; English trans. by B. Marshall, 1884)

Of her writings in defense of the emancipation of women, Osterbriefe für die Frauen (1863) and Für und wider die Frauen (1870) are conspicuous. She also wrote sketches of travel. Her autobiography, Meine Lebensgeschichte (6 vols, 1861–1862), affords glimpses of the literary life of her time.

A selection of her works, published under the title Gesammelte Schriften in 12 vols (1870–1874) have been translated by Hanna Lewis into English as Recollections of 1848 and The Education of Fanny Lewald.

== See also ==
- Theodor Lewald
