= Ludwig Adolf Wilhelm von Lützow =

Prussian general (1782–1834)

Ludwig Adolf Wilhelm Freiherr von Lützow
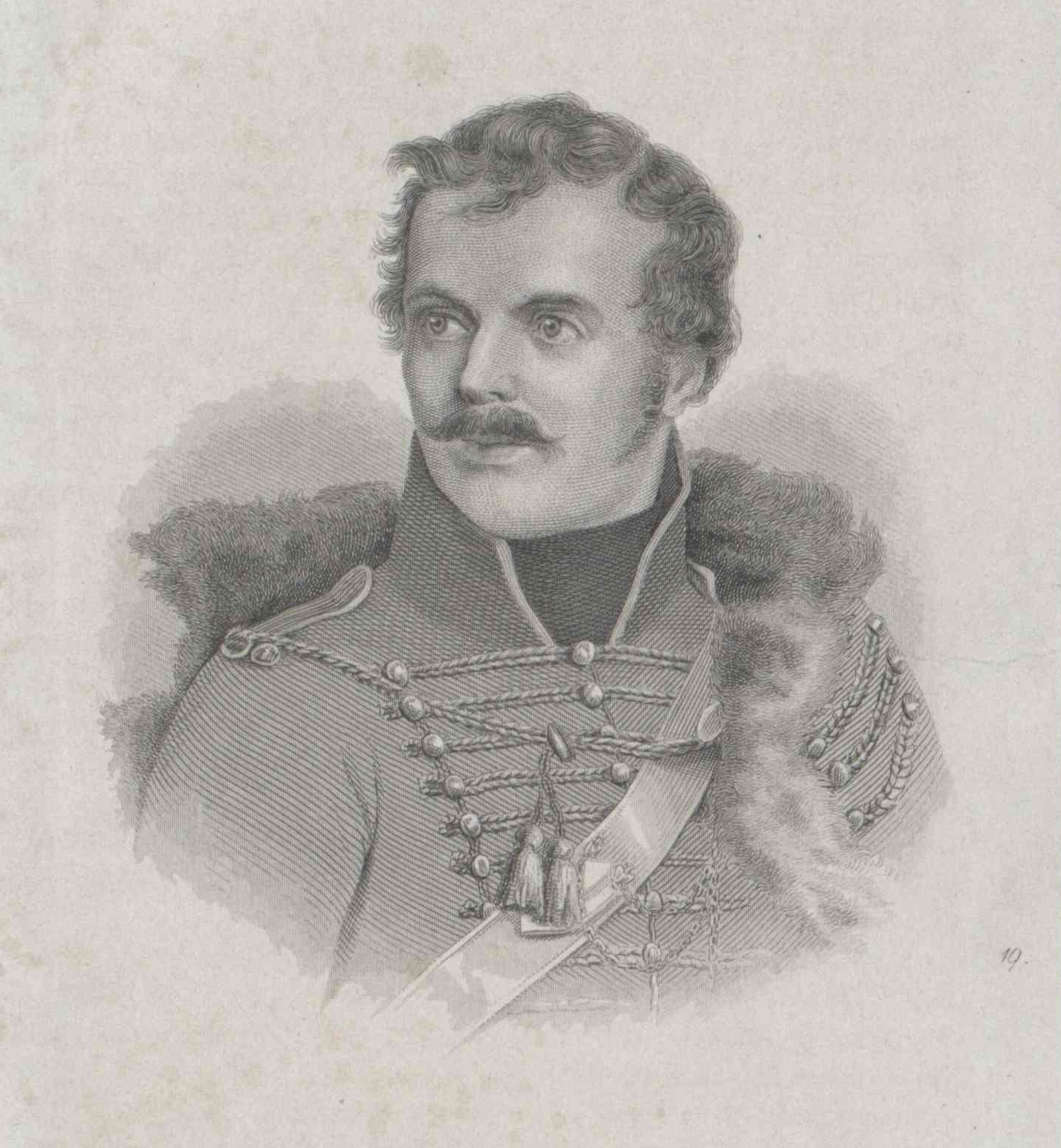
- Born: 18 May 1782; Berlin, Kingdom of Prussia
- Died: 6 December 1834 (aged 52)
- Military career
- Allegiance: Prussia
- Branch: Prussian Army
- Service years: 1795–1808, 1811–1830 (Prussia); 1808–1811 (Insurgents)
- Rank: Lieutenant General
- Units: Schill Free Corps
- Commands: Lützow Free Corps
- Conflicts: Napoleonic Wars
- Awards: Pour le Merite with oak leaves

Ludwig Adolf Wilhelm Freiherr von Lützow (18 May 1782 – 6 December 1834) was a Prussian general notable for his organization and command of the Lützow Freikorps of volunteers during the Napoleonic Wars.

== Early life ==
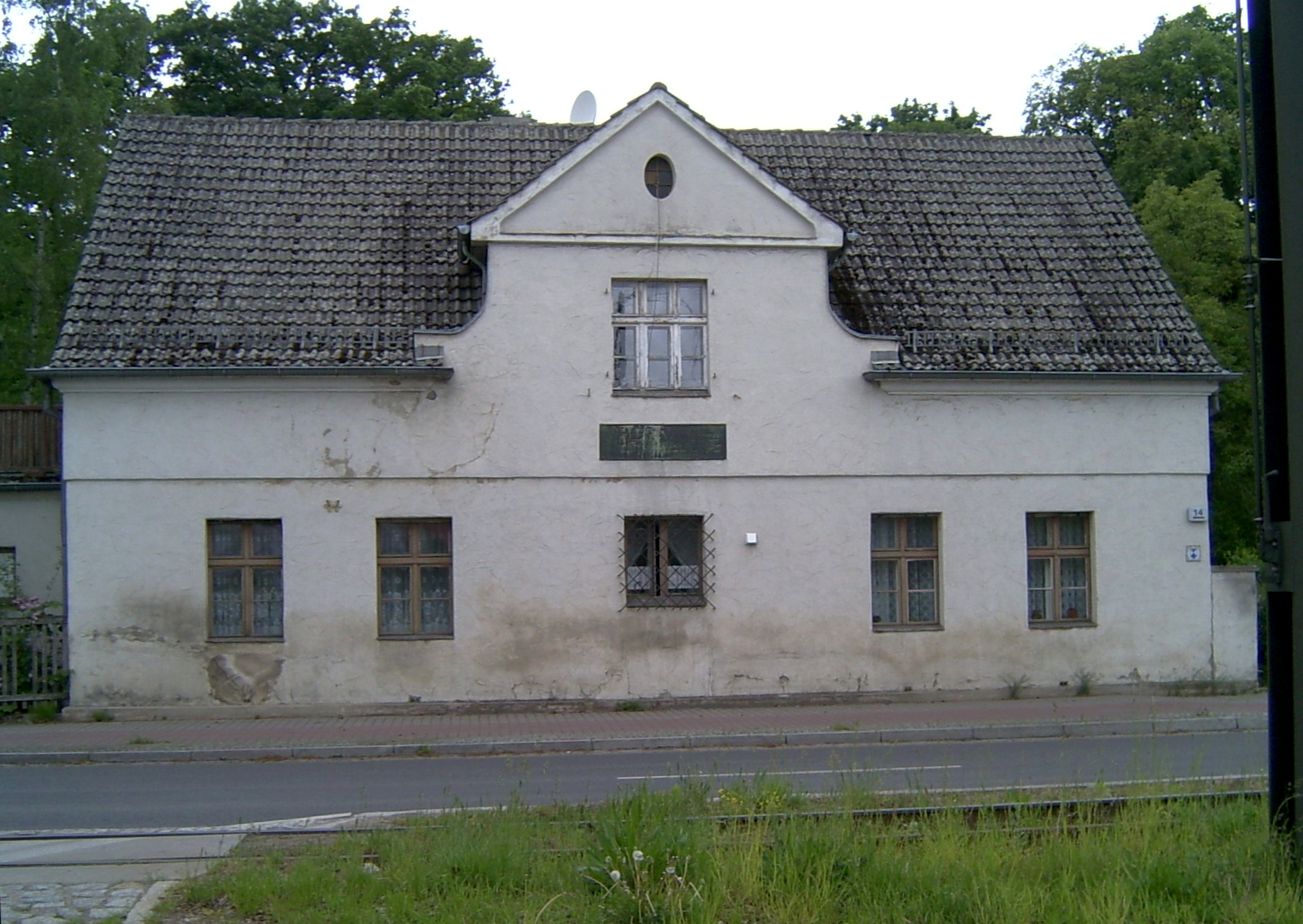
Lützowhaus in Schöneiche

Lützow was born in Berlin on 18 May 1782 as the son of Prussian Major General, Johann Adolph von Lützow (1748–1819), and his wife, Friederike Wilhelmine von Zastrow (1754 to 1815). He belonged to an old noble family from Mecklenburg.

== Biography ==
Lützow first entered the Prussian Army in 1795, and eleven years later as a lieutenant took part in the disastrous battle of Auerstadt. He then achieved distinction in the siege of Kolberg, as the leader of a squadron of Schill's volunteers.

In 1808, as a major Lützow retired from the Prussian army, indignant at the humiliating treaty of Tilsit. He took part in the heroic venture of his old chief Schill in 1809; wounded at Dodendorf and left behind, he thereby escaped the fate of his comrades, many of whom were either killed at the Battle of Stralsund (1809) or were among the 12 officers executed at Napoleon's command in the aftermath. In Schöneiche he was hidden by the owner of the village in a little hunters' hut at the village border and there Lützow was able to recover from his wounds. Today the newer building made of stone is called "Lützowhaus" ("Lützow House") in commemoration of this episode.

== Lützow Free Corps ==
In 1811, Lützow was recommissioned into the Prussian army as major, and at the outbreak of the German War of Liberation received permission from Scharnhorst to organize a free corps consisting of infantry, cavalry and Tirolese riflemen, for attacking flanks or in guerilla fighting in the French rear and rallying the smaller governments into the ranks of the allies. From their uniform, they were known as the "Black Troopers" or "Black Riflemen".

The valor of the Black Troop is commemorated in Theodor Körner's poem Lützows wilde, verwegene Jagd ("Lützow's wild, daring hunt"). As Lützow's adjutant, he met his death at the Battle of Gadebusch. Among other notable members of the corps were Friedrich Fröbel and Friedrich Ludwig Jahn. This incident was portrayed in the 1927 film Lützow's Wild Hunt directed by Richard Oswald.

This corps played a marked part in the campaign of 1813. But Lützow was unable to coerce the minor states, and the wanderings of the corps had little military influence. At Kitzen (near Leipzig) the whole corps, warned too late of the armistice of Poischwitz, was caught on the French side of the line of demarcation, and, as a fighting force, annihilated. Lützow himself, wounded, cut his way out with the survivors, and immediately began reorganizing and recruiting.

In the second part of the campaign the corps Lützow served in more regular warfare under Wallmoden. Lützow and his men distinguished themselves at Gadebusch (where Körner fell) and Göhrde (where Lützow himself, for the second time, received a severe wound at the head of the cavalry). Sent next against Denmark, and later employed at the siege of Jülich, Lützow in 1814 fell into the hands of the French.

== Late career ==
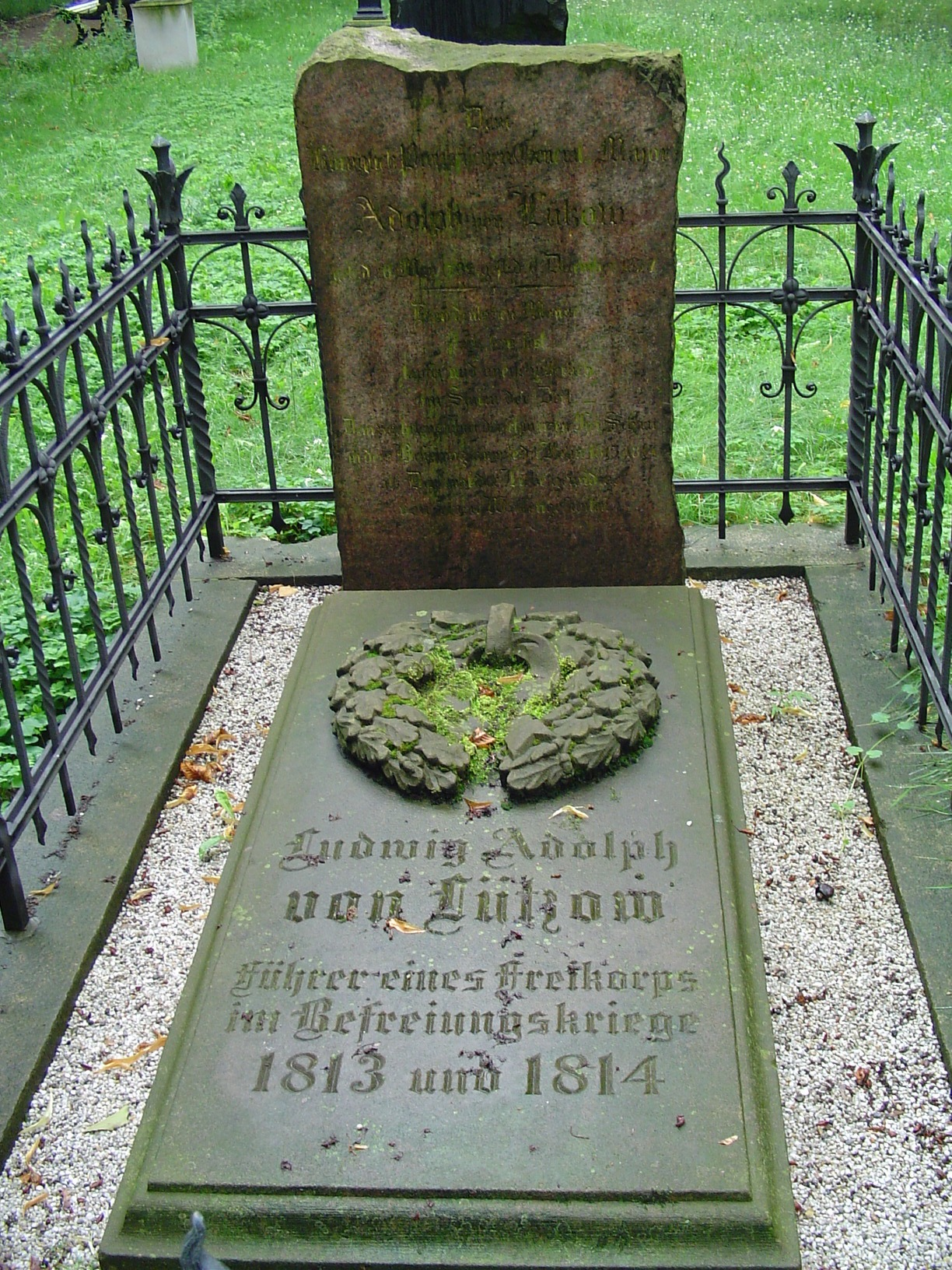
His grave in the old garrison cemetery in Berlin

After the peace of 1814 the corps was dissolved, the infantry becoming the 25th Regiment, the cavalry the 6th Uhlans. At Ligny Lützow led the 6th Uhlans to the charge, but they were broken by the French cavalry, and he finally remained in the hands of the enemy, escaping the next day during the French defeat at the Waterloo. Made colonel in that year, his subsequent promotions were: major-general 1822, and lieutenant-general (on retirement) 1830.

Lützow died on 6 December 1834. One of the last acts of his life for which Lützow is remembered is his challenge (which was ignored) to Blücher (died in 1819), who had been ridden down in the rout of the 6th Ulans at the Battle of Ligny, and had made, in his official report, comments thereon, which their colonel considered disparaging.

== Legacy ==
Several German warships including SMS Lützow of World War I, and the heavy cruiser Lützow (ex-Deutschland) of World War II, were named after him.

The 37th SS Volunteer Cavalry Division Lützow was also named after him.

Democratic Germany's national colours Black, Red and Gold originate from the iconic Lützower's black uniforms, which showed red insignia and golden buttons.

Miernicza Street, a street in Wrocław, Poland, was formerly called Lützowstraße.
