= University of Vechta =

Research university in northwestern Germany

Coordinates: 52°44′00″N 8°17′00″E

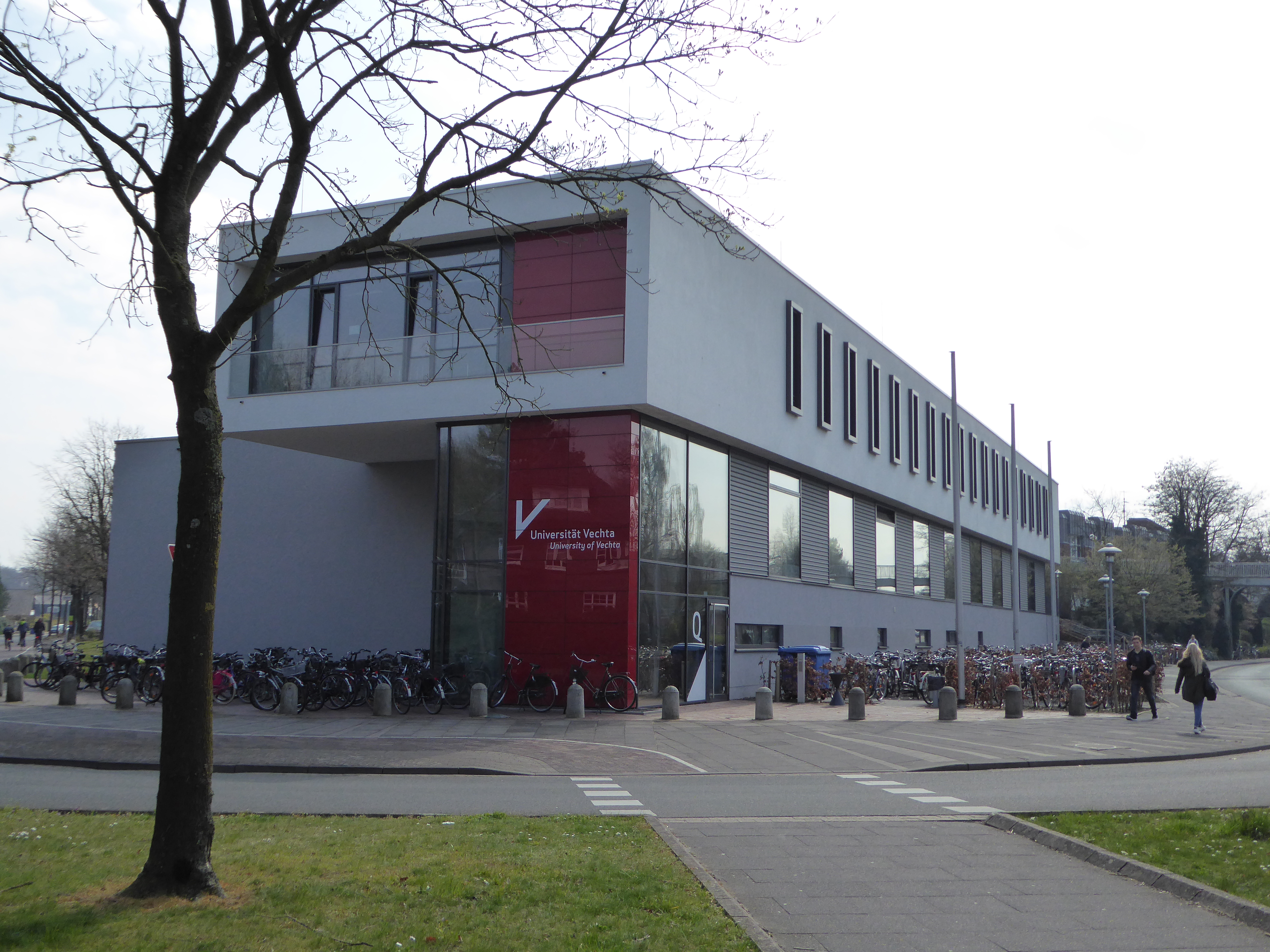
Lecture building Q at the corner of Driver- und Universitätsstraße

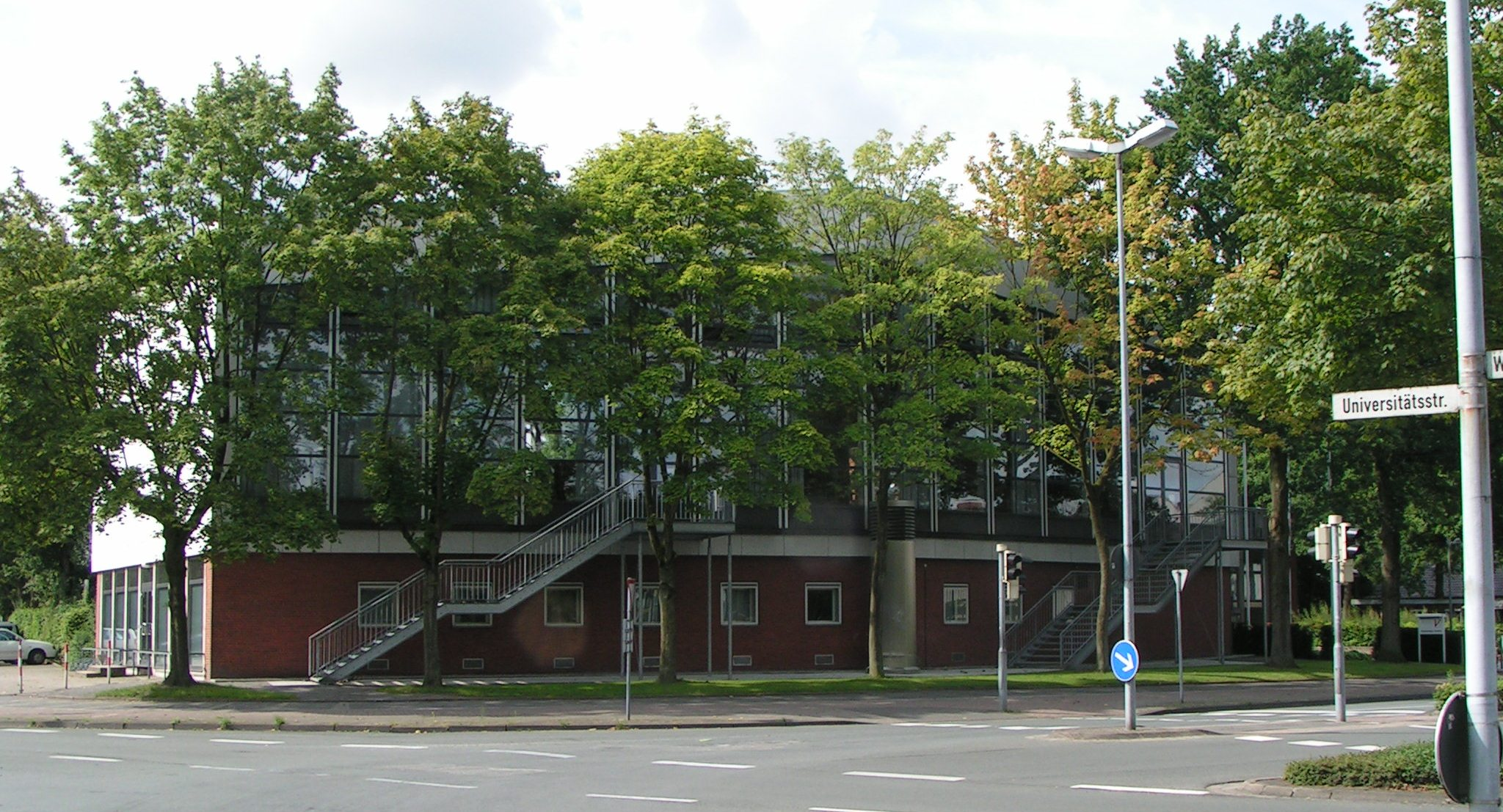
Aula in the main building of the University of Vechta

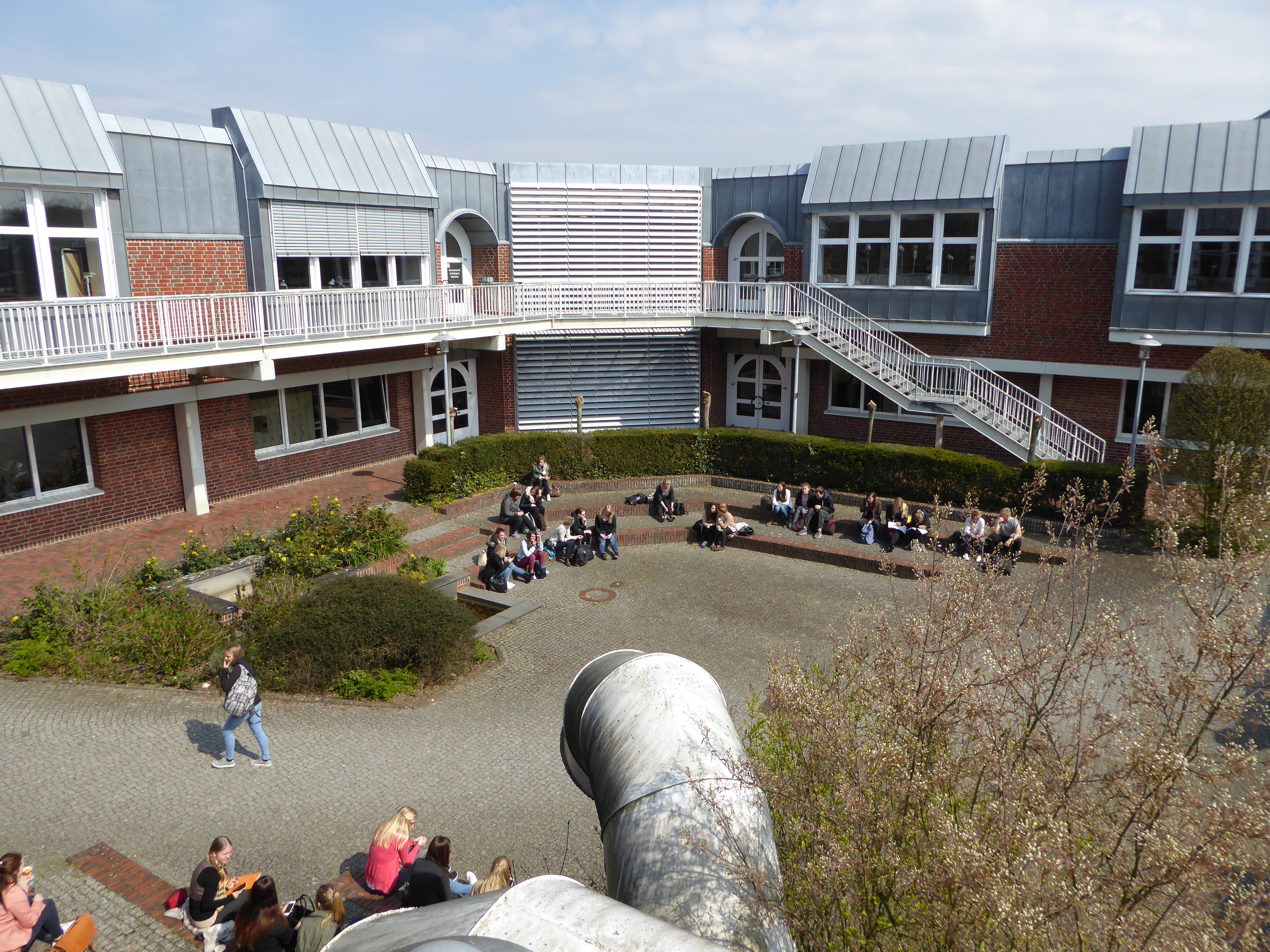
Central Campus Square at lunchtime. In the background is the library.

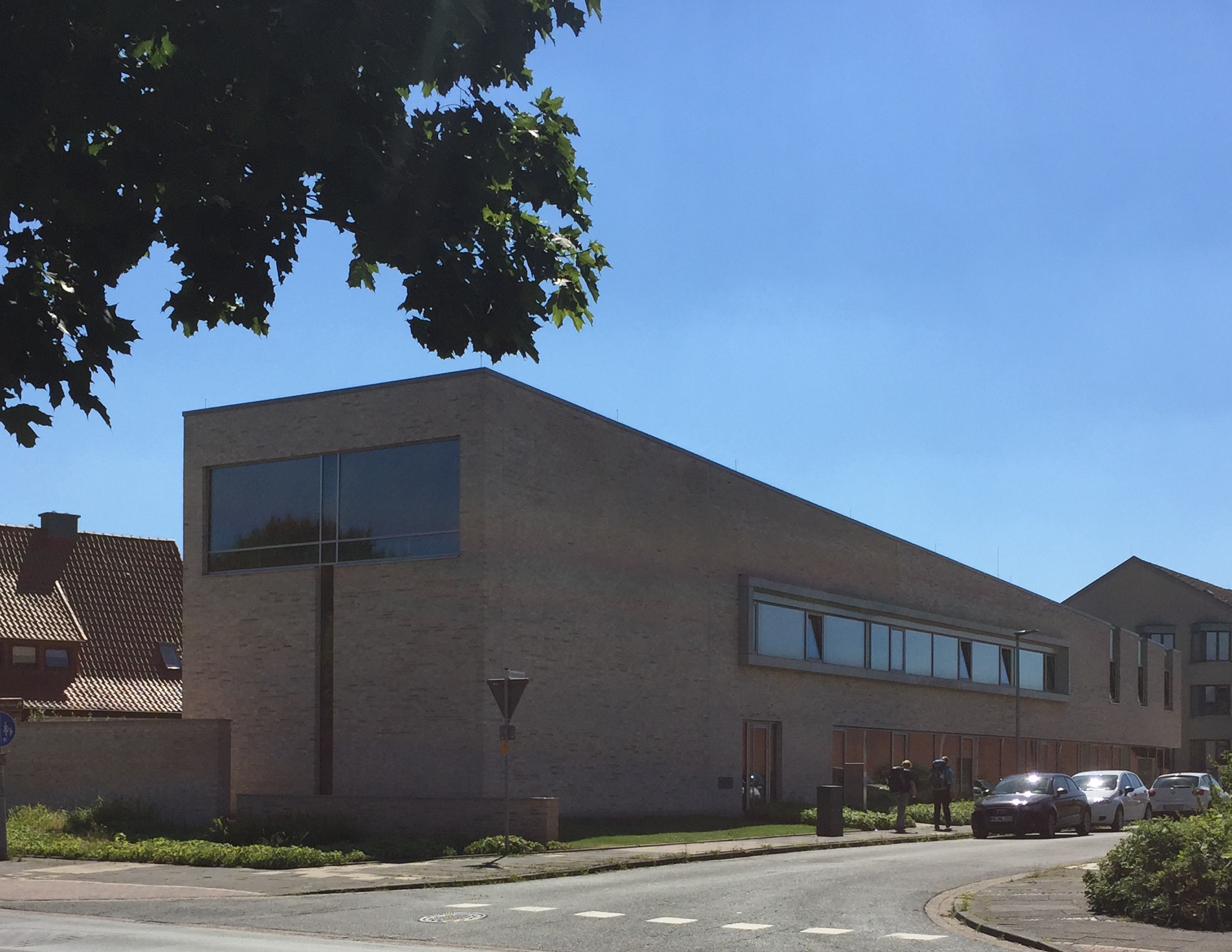
Church on campus at the University of Vechta

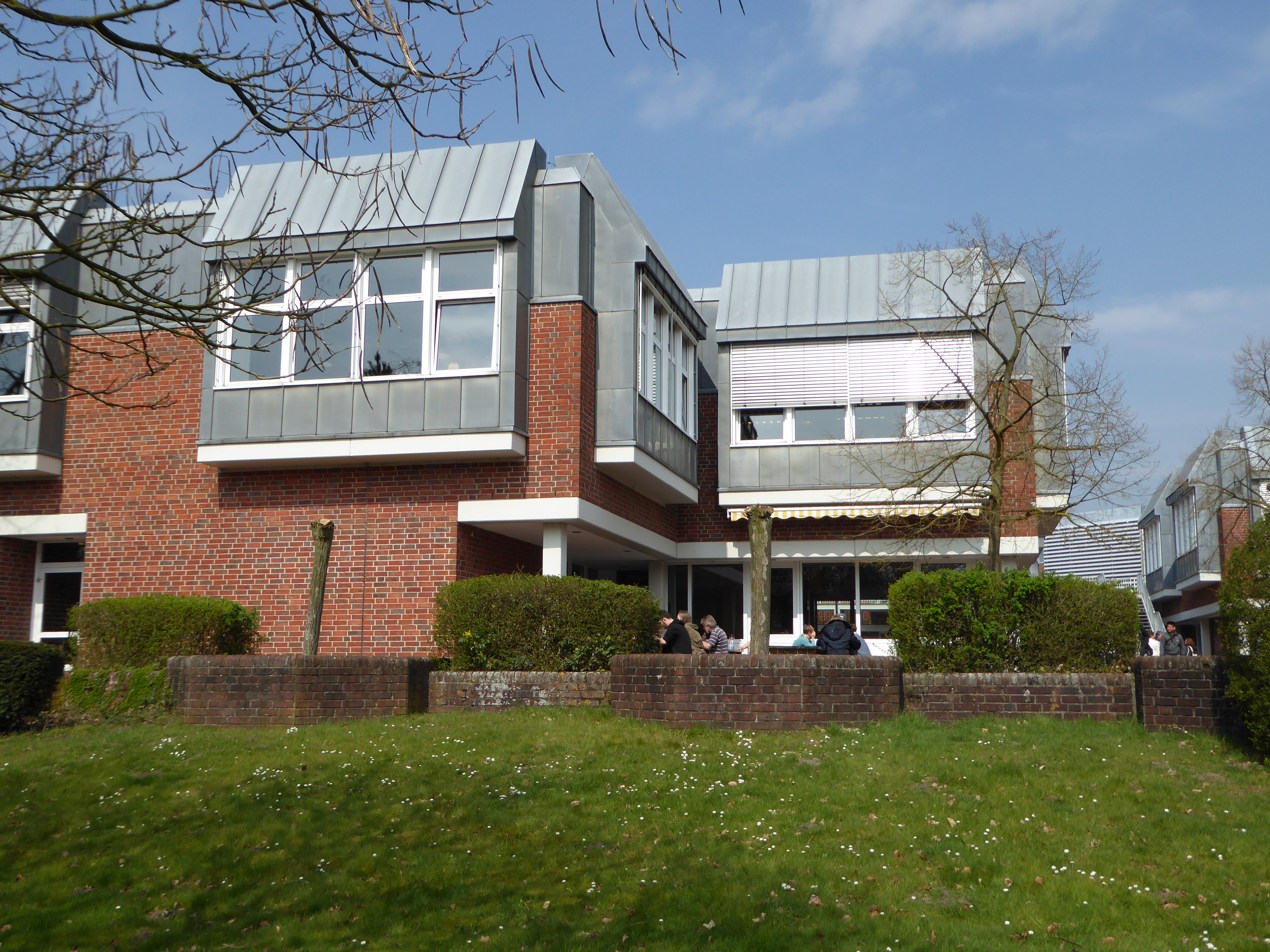
Building M: On the ground floor is a bistro, the cafeteria upstairs.

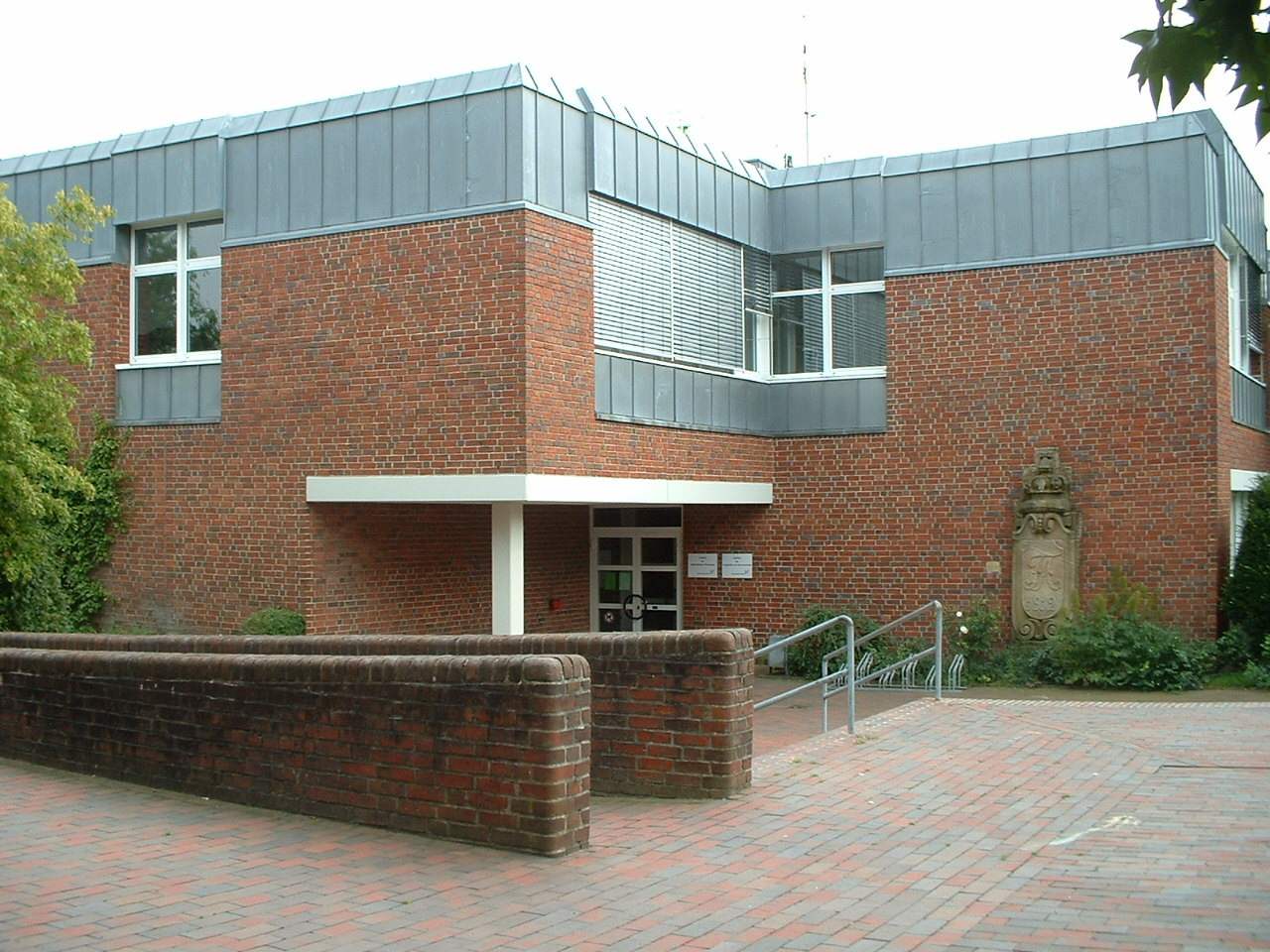
Institute of Humanities and Cultural Sciences as well as the Institute of Catholic Religion

University of Vechta (Universität Vechta) is a small research university in northwestern Germany, in the town of Vechta in Lower Saxony. Its study programmes concentrate on teacher training, social sciences, social work, philosophy, and gerontology.

== Background ==
The University has about 5,300 students (2016). It emerged from the former College of Education and belonged from 1973 to 1995 to Osnabrück University. From 1995 to 2010 it officially had the status of a "Scientific University of the State of Lower Saxony with university status". After a change of the Lower Saxony Higher Education Act, since June 2010 it may now officially call itself a university. Vechta as a place of study has been in existence since August 2, 1830 with the establishment of a normal school for the Grand Duchy of Oldenburg. The emphasis has historically been in the areas of teacher training and Catholic theology.

In 1830, the normal school for the education of Catholic elementary school teachers in the state of Oldenburg was founded, which was expanded in 1861 as a teacher training college. 1928 was the opening of the educational course in Vechta. On April 1, 1941, the "Oldenburgische Lehrerbildungsanstalt Vechta i. O. ", for whose accommodation the Dominikanerkloster Füchtel was confiscated. After the end of the Nazi-period, it was re-established (on 19 March 1946) as a confessionally bound State Pedagogical Academy Vechta. After the incorporation of Oldenburg in the Land of Lower Saxony on November 1, 1946, the Pedagogical Academy was transferred by decree of December 31, 1947 in the University of Education Vechta (PH Vechta). In 1965, the Lower Saxony Concordat guaranteed the education of Catholic teachers in Vechta. In 1969, the eight educational colleges in Lower Saxony were united to form the Lower Saxony University of Education. In 1973, the PH Vechta department/location of the newly founded University of Osnabrück. In the meantime the existence was massively endangered; in 1987 it even came to the recommendation of the Science Council to close the college.
