= 1935 Star Riders' Championship =

Seasons
- ← 1934 none →

The 1935 Star Riders' Championship was decided over twenty heats, and the rider with the highest total score was crowned as champion. Tom Farndon and Ron Johnson did not take part after crashing the night before at the New Cross Stadium, an accident that cost Farndon his life the day after the final. Geoff Pymar and Norman Parker replaced them.

1935 was the final running of the Star Riders' Championship. From 1936, Motorcycle speedway would have its own official Speedway World Championship.

== Final ==
- 29 August 1935
- Wembley, England

Pos.	Rider	Heat scores	Total
1	(England) Frank Charles	(3,3,3,3,3)	15
2	(England) Jack Ormston	(3,3,3,2,3)	14
3	(Australia) Max Grosskreutz	(3,3,3,1,3)	13
4	(England) Eric Langton	(0,3,2,3,2)	10
5	(England) Jack Parker	(2,2,0,3,3)	10
6	(Australia) Bluey Wilkinson	(2,2,3,1,2)	10
7	(Australia) Vic Huxley	(3,1,1,2,2)	9
8	(Australia) Dicky Case	(1,2,2,3,R)	8
9	(England) Tommy Croombs	(2,1,2,1,1)	7
10	(England) Norman Parker	(2,1,1,2,0)	6
11	(England) Bill Kitchen	(1,2,1,R,R)	4
12	(England) Tiger Stevenson	(0,0,2,1,1)	4
13	(Australia) Lionel van Praag	(1,0,2,0,0)	3
14	(England) Geoff Pymar	(1,1,0,0,1)	3
15	(Australia) Jack Sharp	(0,0,1,0,R)	1
16	(New Zealand) Wally Kilmister	(F,-,-,-,-)	0
*	(England) Tom Farndon	withdrawn	-
*	(Australia) Ron Johnson	withdrawn	-
