= Frank Charles (speedway rider) =

British motorcycle speedway rider

- Born: 10 March 1908; Barrow-in-Furness, England
- Died: 15 July 1939 (aged 31)
- Nationality: British (English)

Career history
- 1929: Burnley
- 1929: Preston
- 1930: Manchester White City
- 1931: Leeds Lions
- 1931-1934: Belle Vue Aces
- 1935-1939: Wembley Lions

Individual honours
- 1935: Star Riders' Champion

Team honours
- 1929: English Dirt Track KO Cup Winner
- 1933, 1934: National League Champion
- 1933, 1934: National Trophy Winner
- 1934: A.C.U. Cup Winner

Frank Charles (10 March 1908 – 15 July 1939) was a former international motorcycle speedway rider who won the Star Riders' Championship in 1935 and rode in the first ever World Championship final in 1936.

== Career summary ==
Prior to taking up speedway, Charles worked as a baker and grocer, and performed in music halls with a piano accordion. In 1929, Charles rode for Burnley, in 1930 for Manchester White City and then for Leeds Lions and Belle Vue in 1931 but was badly injured and lost his form, and so retired from the sport. In 1933, the Belle Vue Aces tempted him out of retirement, and looked to have regained his former form when he won the Wembley championship that year, also breaking the track record. In 1934, Charles' father died, so he returned to the family business. In 1935, Wembley Lions paid £1,000 to sign Charles, where he became the club's top scorer and was selected to ride for England against Australia. He went on to win the Star Riders' Championship despite only initially taking part in the competition as a replacement for Ginger Lees.

In 1936 again with Wembley, Charles topped the club's scoring again, was top scorer for the England Test team, and qualified for World Championship final, tying for fourth place with Cordy Milne, and broke the track record during the meeting. He qualified again for the 1937 final. At the end of the 1938 season, he decided to retire to concentrate on his long-term hobby of gliding.

== World Final appearances ==
- 1936 - (England) London, Wembley Stadium - 5th - 20pts
- 1937 - (England) London, Wembley Stadium - 5th - 17pts

== Death ==
On 15 June 1939, Charles made a return to the Wembley Lions team. However, after being excused a test call up on 15 July 1939, Charles was killed whilst taking part in a national gliding competition.

== Players cigarette cards ==
Charles is listed as number 6 of 50 in the 1930s Player's cigarette card collection.
