= List of 1930 motorsport champions =

1930 motorsport champions
Previous: 1929	Next: 1931

This list of 1930 motorsport champions is a list of national or international auto racing series with a Championship decided by the points or positions earned by a driver from multiple races.

== Open wheel racing ==
Series	Driver	Season article
AAA National Championship	(United States) Billy Arnold	1930 AAA Championship Car season

== Hill Climbing ==
Series	Driver	Season article
European Hill Climbing Championship	Racing: (Germany) Hans Stuck	1930 European Hill Climbing Championship
European Hill Climbing Championship	Sports: (Germany) Rudolf Caracciola	1930 European Hill Climbing Championship

== Motorcycle racing ==
=== Speedway ===
Series	Driver	Season article
Star Riders' Championship	(Australia) Vic Huxley	1930 Star Riders' Championship

== See also ==
- List of motorsport championships
- Auto racing
