= List of 1929 motorsport champions =

1929 motorsport champions
Previous: 1928	Next: 1930

This list of 1929 motorsport champions is a list of national or international auto racing series with a Championship decided by the points or positions earned by a driver from multiple races.

== Open wheel racing ==
Series	Driver	Season article
AAA National Championship	(United States) Louis Meyer	1929 AAA Championship Car season

== Motorcycle racing ==
=== Speedway ===
Series	Driver	Season article
Star Riders' Championship	(Australia) Frank Arthur	1929 Star Riders' Championship
Star Riders' Championship	British: (United Kingdom) Roger Frogley	1929 Star Riders' Championship

== See also ==
- List of motorsport championships
- Auto racing
