= 1930 Star Riders' Championship =

Motorcycle speedway competition in 1930

Seasons
- ← 1929 1931 →

The 1930 Star Riders' Championship was the second edition of the speedway Star Riders' Championship. The competition was decided on a knockout basis over eight heats.

== Final ==
- 12 September 1930
- Wembley, England

Pos.	Rider	Total
1	(Australia) Vic Huxley	12
2	(Australia) Frank Arthur	10
3	(England) Jack Ormston	5
4	(England) Geoff Taylor	4
5	(England) Harry Taft	3
6	(England) Colin Watson	0
7	(England) Squib Burton	0
8	(England) Roger Frogley	0
9	(England) Jim Kempster	0
10	(England) Tiger Stevenson	0
11	(England) Syd Jackson	0
12	(England) Tom Farndon	0

=== Heat details ===
Heat 1 : Arthur, Taylor, Stevenson (Fell)
Heat 2 : Taft, Frogley (Fell), Jackson (Fell)
Heat 3 : Huxley, Watson, Kempster
Heat 4 : Ormston, Burton (Ret), Farndon (Ret)

Semi-final 1 : Arthur, Taylor, Taft
Semi-final 2 : Huxley, Ormston, Watson

Final (1st leg): Huxley, Arthur
Final (2nd leg): Huxley, Arthur
