= 1929 Star Riders' Championship =

Motorcycle speedway competition in 1929

Seasons
- ← none 1930 →

The 1929 Star Riders' Championship was the inaugural edition of the speedway Star Riders' Championship. The competition was decided in two sections, British riders and overseas riders, due to the strength of the more experienced overseas riders. It was held on a knockout basis over different tracks.

== Final standings ==
=== Overseas ===
Pos.	Rider
Winner	(Australia) Frank Arthur
Runner-up	(Australia) Vic Huxley
Semi Finalists	(United States) Billy Lamont (United States) Sprouts Elder
Quarter Finalists	(Australia) Max Grosskreutz (Australia) Ron Johnson (United States) Art Pecha (Australia) Billy Galloway (Australia) Stan Catlett (Australia) Alf Chick

=== Heat details ===
1st Round
Sprouts Elder bt Billy Galloway
Billy Lamont bt Art Pechar
Vic Huxley bt Ron Johnson
Frank Arthur bt Max Grosskreutz
Stan Catlett v Alf Chick (not raced)

Semi-finals
Vic Huxley bt Sprouts Elder
Frank Arthur bt Billy Lamont

Final Frank Arthur bt Vic Huxley

=== British ===
Pos.	Rider
Winner	(England) Roger Frogley
Runner-up	(England) Jack Parker
Semi Finalist	(England) Colin Watson
2nd Round	(England) Ivor Creek (England) Buster Frogley
1st Round	(England) Jim Kempster (England) Tommy Croombs (England) Jimmy Hayes (England) Eric Spencer (England) Gus Kuhn

=== Heat details ===
1st Round
Buster Frogley bt Jim Kempster
Ivor Creek bt Tommy Croombs
Jack Parker bt Jimmy Hayes
Colin Watson bt Eric Spencer
Roger Frogley bt Gus Kuhn

2nd Round
Roger Frogley bt Ivor Creek
Colin Watson bt Buster Frogley
Jack Parker (bye)

Semi-final
Jack Parker bt Colin Watson

Final
Roger Frogley bt Jack Parker
