= 1934 Star Riders' Championship =

Seasons
- ← 1933 1935 →

The 1934 Star Riders' Championship was decided on a knockout basis over nine heats.

== Final ==
- 23 August 1934
- Wembley, England

Pos.	Rider	Total
1	(England) Jack Parker	9
2	(England) Eric Langton	8
3	(England) Ginger Lees	7
=4	(England) Tommy Croombs	5
=4	(England) Syd Jackson	5
6	(Australia) Ron Johnson	4
7	(England) George Newton	4
8	(Australia) Dicky Case	3
9	(England) Bob Harrison	2
=10	(Australia) Bluey Wilkinson	2
=10	(Australia) Jack Chapman	2
=10	(England) Dusty Haigh	2
=13	(Australia) Frank Arthur	1
=13	(England) Claude Rye	1
=13	(England) Mick Murphy	1
=16	(Australia) Jack Sharp	0
=16	(England) Colin Watson	0
=16	(England) Joe Francis	0

=== Heat Details ===
Heat 1 : Langton, Johnson, Parker, Sharp
Heat 2 : Jackson, Wilkinson, Arthur, Watson
Heat 3 : Lees, Case, Rye, Wotton
Heat 4 : Newton, Haigh, Harrison
Heat 5 : Croombs, Chapman, Murphy

Semi-final 1: Langton, Jackson, Case
Semi-final 2: Lees, Johnson, Newton
Semi-final 3: Parker, Croombs, Harrison

Final : Parker, Langton, Lees
