= Sprouts Elder =

American motorcycle speedway rider (1904-1957)

James Lloyd 'Sprouts' Elder
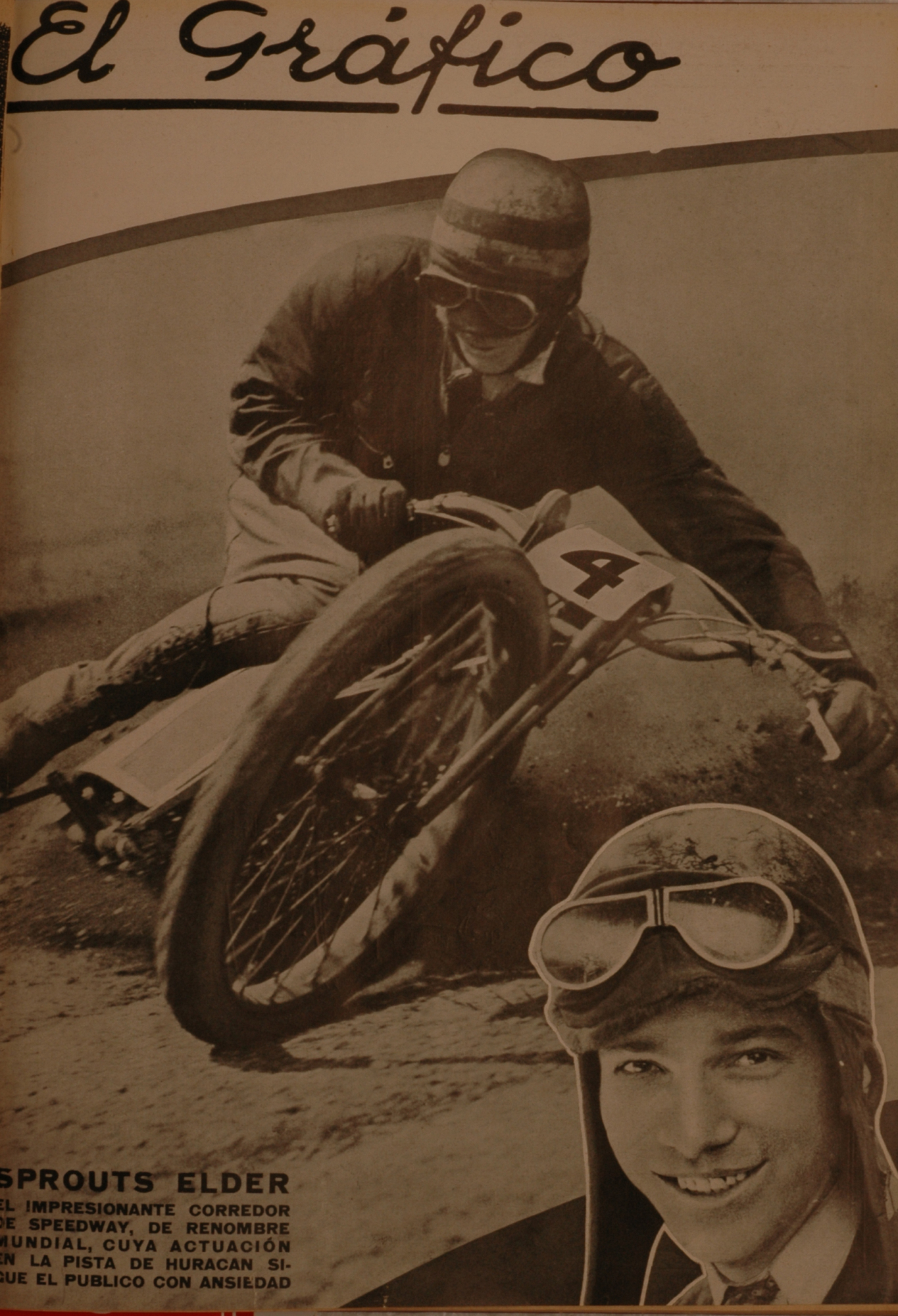
- Elder on the cover of The Graphic, November 30, 1929
- Born: 4 August 1904; Fresno, California, USA
- Died: 8 August 1957 (aged 53); Fresno, California, USA
- Nationality: American

Career history
- 1930: Southampton Saints

Individual honours
- 1925: American Champion
- 1927, 1928: Maroubra Golden Helmet
- 1928: Manchester Golden Helmet
- 1928: Leicester Golden Helmet
- 1928: West Ham Golden Gauntlet
- 1928: West Ham Championship
- 1928: Wimbledon Silver Wheel
- 1928: Wimbledon Silver Sash
- 1928: West Ham Silver Belt
- 1929: Scottish Golden Helmet
- 1929: Scottish Silver Helmet
- 1929, 1930, 1931: Argentine Golden Helmet
- 1929, 1930: Argentine Silver Helmet
- 1929: Argentine Bronze Helmet
- 1931: World Champion (unofficial)

James Lloyd Elder, known as Sprouts Elder (4 August 1904 – 8 August 1957) was an international motorcycle speedway rider. Elder is considered the father of American broadsliding.

== Career ==
Elder initially wanted to become a jockey but by his late teens had grown to almost six feet tall, leading to his 'Sprouts' nickname. He got a job in a motorcycle shop and began racing, eventually taking up speedway. He initially learned to race racing on some of the last surviving board track racing circuits during the 1920s. In the late 1920s, Elder really began to make a name for himself by racing overseas.

Elder was also a pioneer of speedway racing in the USA. He was a champion rider at home and abroad during the 1920s and early 1930s and helped organize speedway racing on the east and west coasts of America, later becoming an AMA referee and a member of the competition committee. In 1925 Sprouts Elder became the inaugural AMA American Speedway Champion.

Elder was also a visitor to Australia, winning the Maroubra Golden Helmet four times in 1927, and once in 1928 on the concrete 1 mile Maroubra Speedway. In Australia Elder raced against top Australian as well as several top British and American riders who also spent the winter months racing in the Australian summer, mostly on the larger showground tracks of the day such as the Sydney Showground Speedway, Brisbane Exhibition Ground (Ekka), the Wayville Showground in Adelaide, and Perth's Claremont Speedway (as of 2014 only the Ekka and Wayville stand as they did in the late 1920s and early 1930s when Elder rode there). Elder also won titles in South America, including the first unofficial Speedway World Championship event at Buenos Aires, Argentina, while under contract to A.J. Hunting. He also won numerous Argentine Gold, Silver and Bronze Helmets in 1929, 1930 and 1930.

1928 saw Elder turn his attention to racing in the United Kingdom, becoming one of the most popular riders in the country. He could command fees of £100 per meeting, plus prize money, and once earned £350 in a day by racing at three nearby tracks. He is estimated to have earned £50,000 in his first three years of riding in Britain. Crowds of 30,000 to 40,000 were not uncommon at larger meetings during the heyday of speedway racing in England. Elder's popularity was revealed when the British paper Speedway News honoured Elder by calling him the greatest showman of all time. In 1928, he won several titles in Britain, including the Golden Helmet at White City, Manchester, the Golden Gauntlet and West Ham Championship at West Ham, the Silver Wheel and Silver Sash at Wimbledon, the Silver Belt at Custom House, and the Golden Helmet at Leicester, while also winning the Scottish Gold and Silver Helmets in 1929. He never rode for the West Ham Hammers in 1929 but was their overseas representative in the Star Riders' Championship, and in 1930 he rode for the Southampton Saints.

Elder was one of speedway's pioneers and featured in the first Star Riders' Championship, the forerunner to the Speedway World Championship in 1929. He was beaten in the semi-final of the 'overseas' section by Australian Vic Huxley.

During the mid-1930s, Elder returned to the United States to help organize American speedway. Speedway racing was among the popular forms of motorcycle racing in the country. Elder, along with Wilbur Lamoreaux, Jack and Cordy Milne, he helped found and promote speedway in America.

== Retirement ==
Elder retired from racing after joining the California Highway Patrol and was responsible for securing sponsorship from the Highway Patrol for a number of meetings. Elder retired from the patrol after suffering life-threatening injuries in a traffic accident. Even after retirement, Elder stayed involved with racing through his duties on the AMA Competition Committee.

Elder lost his fortune after investing in a failed mining venture.

== Death ==
Elder died in 1957 after committing suicide following the death of his wife. He was posthumously inducted into the Fresno County Athletic Hall of Fame in 1962, and into the AMA Motorcycle Hall of Fame in 1998.
