= Bill Pitcher =

British motorcycle speedway rider

- Born: 5 February 1910; Coventry, England
- Died: 24 October 1995 (aged 85); Queens County, Prince Edward Island, Canada
- Nationality: British (English)

Career history
- 1930-1931: Leicester Stadium
- 1931: Crystal Palace Glaziers
- 1932-1933: Coventry
- 1934: Birmingham Bulldogs
- 1935-1939: Harringay Tigers
- 1946-1948: Belle Vue Aces
- 1949: Wimbledon Dons

Team honours
- 1946, 1947: National Trophy winner
- 1935: London Cup winner
- 1946: A.C.U. Cup winner

William George Henry Pitcher (born 5 February 1910 in Coventry, England - died 24 October 1995) was an international motorcycle speedway rider who rode in the first ever World Championship final in 1936. He earned seven international caps for the England national speedway team.

== Career ==
From 1930 to 1933, Pitcher rode for Leicester Stadium, Crystal Palace Glaziers and Coventry. In 1934, he rode one season for Birmingham Bulldogs and continued to compete in individual meetings.

Pitcher's career blossomed after he joined Harringay Tigers in 1935 and rode for them for five years before World War II interrupted his career. He a member of the team that won the London Cup in 1935 and in 1936 he rode in the first ever Speedway World Championship.

After the end of the war, Pitcher joined the Belle Vue Aces. Pitcher was also a member of the England team that toured Australia in 1946–47. He made his England international debut in 1939. His final season was in 1949 with the Wimbledon Dons.

== World Final appearances ==
- 1936 - (England) London, Wembley Stadium - 17th - 8pts
