= Track racing =

Motorcycle racing on oval track

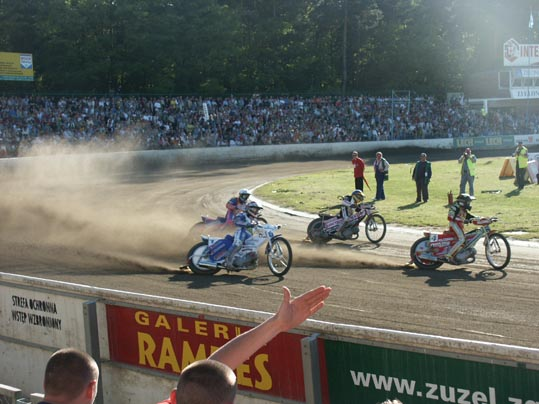
Speedway riders powersliding around a corner

Track racing is a form of motorcycle racing in which teams or individuals race around an unpaved oval track. There are several variants, each contested on different surface types. Administered internationally by the Fédération Internationale de Motocyclisme (FIM), the sport became popular in the 1920s and remains so today.

The most common variant is speedway, which has many professional domestic and international competitions in a number of countries.

== Overview ==
Track racing typically involves four to eight competitors riding around an oval track in a counter-clockwise direction over a set number of laps—usually four to six, sometimes eight—with points awarded to all but the last finisher on a sliding scale.

Riders accumulate points over several heats, with the winner being the overall highest-scoring team or individual.

== Motorcycles ==
The machines used are customised motorcycles; these have no brakes and run on methanol. Speedway racing also uses motorcycles with no gears or rear suspension. The use of methanol allows for a higher compression ratio, resulting in increased power and speeds of approximately 80 mph (130 km/h) when cornering.

However, the key skill in track racing is the rider's ability to control the motorcycle through corners without losing momentum. This has led to the use of powersliding or broadsiding as the primary cornering technique in most variants of the sport.

== Track types ==
Competitions take place on tracks defined by the FIM as follows:

- Speedway: A top surface of granulated granite, shale, brick, or similar loose material rolled onto the base ground.
- Longtrack: Sand, shale, or similar loose material rolled onto the base ground.
- Grasstrack: A firm, level turf with minor undulations.
- Ice speedway: Ice with a minimum thickness of 20 cm (7.9 in).
- Flat track: A form of track racing conducted on an oval or TT track.

== Variants ==
=== Speedway ===
Speedway racing takes place on a flat oval track measuring between 260 to 425 m (853 to 1,394 ft) in length, usually consisting of dirt or loosely packed shale. Riders use the loose surface to slide their machines sideways into corners, using the rear wheel to reduce speed while maintaining forward drive.

FIM regulations state that motorcycles must have no brakes, run on pure methanol, use a single gear, and weigh a minimum of 78 kg (172 lb). Races consist of four to six riders competing over four to six laps.

Originating in New South Wales, Australia in the 1920s, speedway now features domestic and international competitions in many countries, including the Speedway World Cup, while the highest-scoring rider in the Speedway Grand Prix series is declared world champion.

=== Flat track ===
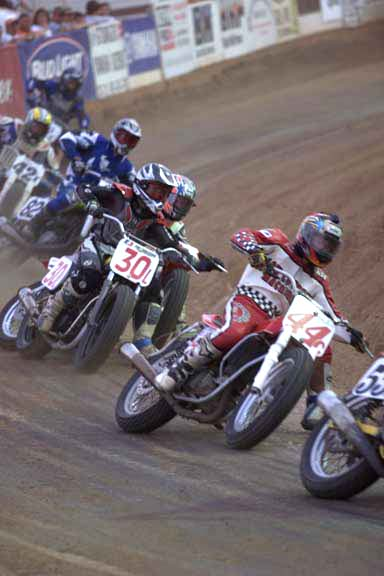
Flat track racers entering a corner

Flat track motorcycles may use either two-stroke or four-stroke engines in amateur competition, and are equipped with front and rear suspension and rear brakes. The presence of brakes distinguishes flat track from speedway, as it enables different cornering techniques. Four-stroke motorcycles dominate professional flat track competition and may be single- or multi-cylinder depending on the venue. Tracks vary from 1/4 mile (400 m) to 1 mile (1,600 m).

Successful riders often move to road racing, which is considerably more lucrative. Many top American riders in Grand Prix motorcycle racing began their careers in flat track racing.

=== Grasstrack ===
Grasstrack racing takes place on a flat oval track, usually constructed in a field. Grasstrack motorcycles have two gears, rear suspension, and no brakes, and are generally longer than speedway bikes.

Races usually take place over four laps from a standing start. Unlike speedway, which features four riders per race, grasstrack events may include many riders per heat, and circuits are typically longer, allowing higher speeds.

Grasstrack does not have its own official FIM World Championship. The Individual Speedway Long Track World Championship is widely considered the sport’s premier competition, as several rounds are held on grasstrack circuits. The sport does, however, run European championships, including the European Solo Championship and European Sidecar Championship, held annually across the continent. The current European champions are Kenneth Kruse Hansen of Denmark (solo) and the pairing of Markus Venus and Markus Eibl of Germany (sidecars).

=== Longtrack ===
Longtrack is a variant of grasstrack and speedway held on circuits up to 1,200 m (0.75 mi) in length, with speeds reaching 90–100 mph (140–160 km/h). The machinery and rules are the same as for grasstrack. Tracks are typically on sand rather than grass.

Longtrack is particularly popular in Germany, where most tracks are located, although circuits also exist in the Czech Republic, Finland, and Norway. Occasional events are held in Australia and the United States, typically on horse trotting arenas during the off-season. The sport has two annual world championships: an individual championship (the World Longtrack Championship, run in a Grand Prix format) and a team championship (Longtrack of Nations).

=== Ice speedway ===
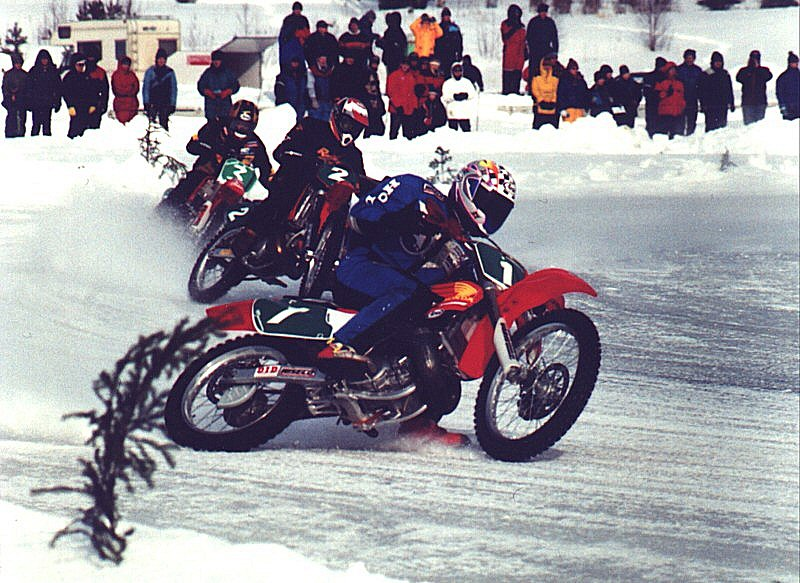
Ice racing in Finland, using non-studded tyres

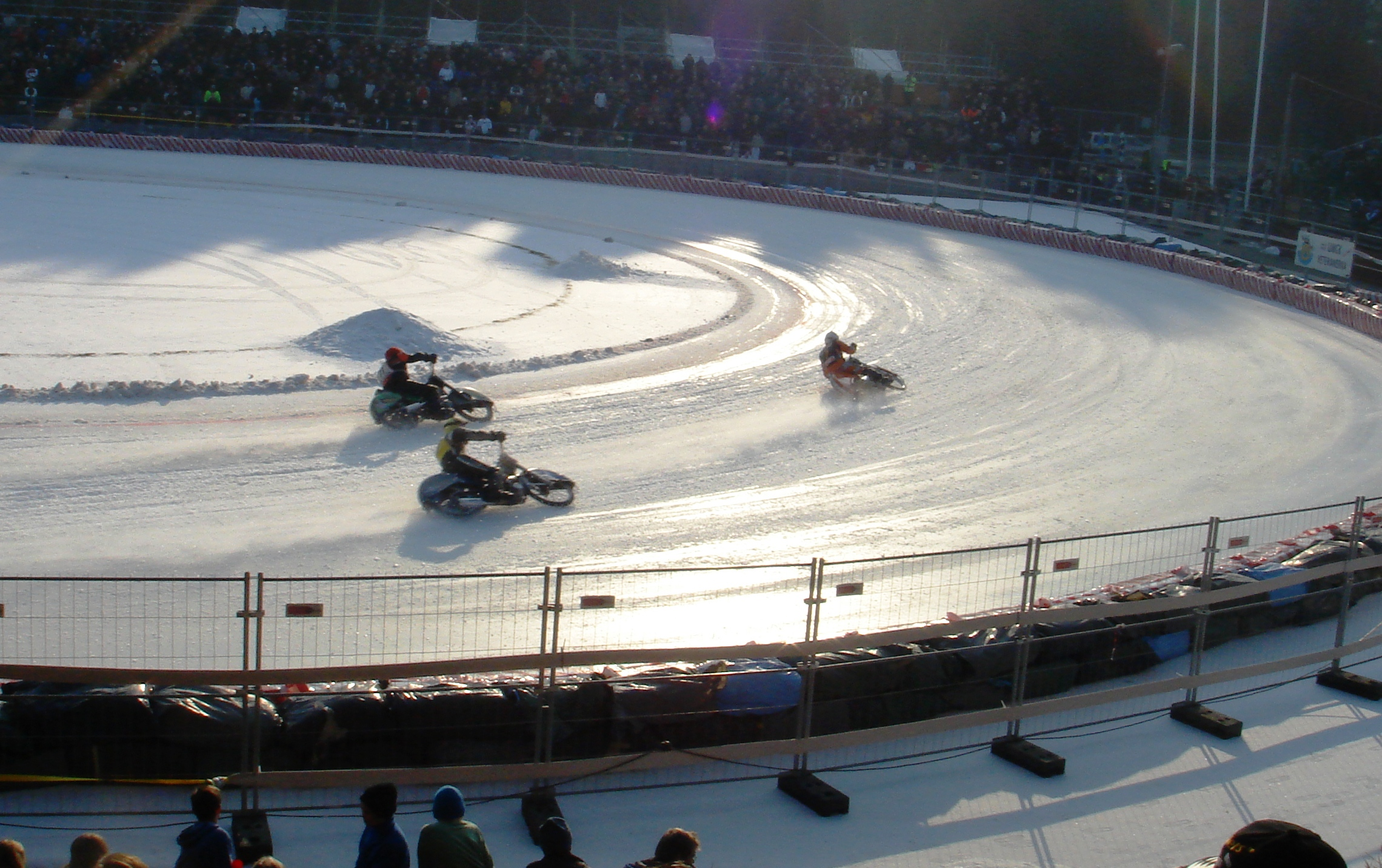
Ice racing using studded tyres

Ice speedway is the ice equivalent of speedway. Bikes race counter-clockwise around oval tracks, also 260 to 425 m (853 to 1,394 ft) in length. The race format and scoring system are similar to speedway.

The sport is divided into classes for studded and non-studded tyres. Studded tyres use spikes approximately one inch long screwed into treadless tyres; each tyre may have around 90 studs at the front and 200 at the rear.

In the studded class, riders do not powerslide due to the extreme grip provided by the studs. Instead, they lean the bike at extreme angles, often with the handlebars close to the track surface. This riding style differs significantly from other track racing disciplines, and riders rarely cross over between ice speedway and other variants.

Most major competitions are held in Russia, Sweden, and Finland, with additional events in the Czech Republic, Germany, the Netherlands, and other countries.
