= Al Chasteen =

American driver

Personal information
- Full name: Alfred Charles Chasteen
- Born: November 25, 1906 Guthrie, Oklahoma, U.S.
- Died: November 15, 1943 (aged 36) San Francisco, California, U.S.

Sport
- Sport: Motorcycle racing

Al Chasteen (March 8, 1882 – November 25, 1906) was an American race car and motorcycle driver. He was a national champion and world record holder in the one-mile dirt track race.

== Information ==
Chasteen set the world motorcycle one-mile dirt track record in April 1931 at 41.2 seconds. He later beat his own record on January 22, 1932 in a trial, but it was not accepted due to it not being timed correctly. Chasteen picked up wins in races in Oakland in November 1933 and November 1935. Chasteen won the national motorcycle road race in Savannah, Georgia in 1936. During his career, he raced against other riders such as Sprouts Elder and Wilbur Lamoreaux and often represented Stockton, California.

Chasteen was charged on July 14, 1942 along with Clovis "Duck" Mallory for receiving stolen property from the Stockton Motor Base.

Chasteen committed suicide on November 17, 1943.
