= List of 1928 motorsport champions =

1928 motorsport champions
Previous: 1927	Next: 1929

This list of 1928 motorsport champions is a list of national or international auto racing series with a Championship decided by the points or positions earned by a driver from multiple races.

== Open wheel racing ==
Series	Driver	Season article
AAA National Championship	(United States) Louis Meyer	1928 AAA Championship Car season
Italian Championship	(Kingdom of Italy) Giuseppe Campari	1928 Italian Championship
Italian Championship	Manufacturers: (Kingdom of Italy) Alfa Romeo	1928 Italian Championship

== See also ==
- List of motorsport championships
- Auto racing
