= List of 1927 motorsport champions =

1927 motorsport champions
Previous: 1926	Next: 1928

This list of 1927 motorsport champions is a list of national or international auto racing series with a Championship decided by the points or positions earned by a driver from multiple races.

== Open wheel racing ==
Series	Champion	Season article
AIACR World Manufacturers' Championship	(France) Delage	1927 Grand Prix season
AAA National Championship	(United States) Pete DePaolo	1927 AAA Championship Car season
Italian Championship	(Kingdom of Italy) Emilio Materassi	1927 Italian Championship
Italian Championship	Manufacturers: (Kingdom of Italy) Maserati	1927 Italian Championship

== See also ==
- List of motorsport championships
- Auto racing
