= Ginger Lees =

British motorcycle speedway rider (1905–1982)

- Born: 28 January 1905; Bury, England
- Died: 26 January 1982; Bury, England
- Nationality: British (English)

Career history
- 1929: Burnley
- 1930: Liverpool Merseysiders
- 1931: Preston
- 1932-1937: Wembley Lions

Team honours
- 1932: National League Champion
- 1932: National Trophy Winner
- 1932, 1933: London Cup Winner

Harry Riley Lees (28 January 1905 – 26 January 1982) was a former international motorcycle speedway rider who rode in the first ever Speedway World Championship final in 1936. He earned 22 international caps for the England national speedway team.

== Career ==
Lees, born in Bury, raced in the first recognised speedway meeting held in Manchester on 3 March 1928. When the league competitions started he joined Burnley, he then moved onto Liverpool in 1930. In 1931, Lees moved onto Preston and was selected to ride for England against Australia in the third test match at Wembley. He impressed so much that he was signed up to ride for the Wembley Lions in 1932 when he won the inaugural National League.

Lees twice won the London Cup with Wembley in 1932 and 1933.

Lees was a regular England rider until 1934, the year he finished third in the Star Riders' Championship, the forerunner of the Speedway World Championship. During 1935, Lees suffered a serious injury and missed most of the 1935 season.

Lees qualified for the finals of the World Championship in 1936 and 1937, before he retired at the end of 1937.

Lees also appeared in the 1933 British film Money for Speed which starred John Loder, Ida Lupino, Cyril McLaglen and Moore Marriott. Lionel van Praag, Frank Varey and speedway promoter Johnnie Hoskins also featured.

== World Final appearances ==
1937 cigarette card illustration

- 1936 - (England) London, Wembley Stadium - 15th - 11pts
- 1937 - (England) London, Wembley Stadium - 5th - 19pts

== Players cigarette cards ==
Lees is listed as number 28 of 50 in the 1930s Player's cigarette card collection.
