= List of FIM affiliated federations =

This is a list of federations affiliated with the Fédération Internationale de Motocyclisme.

== Europe ==
- Europe — Union Européenne de Motocyclisme (FIM Europe)
- Andorra — Federacio Motociclista d’Andorra
- Austria — Oesterreichischer Automobil- Motorrad- und Touring Club
- Belarus — Belarusian Federation of Motorcycle Sport and Bicycle Motocross Sport
- Belgium — Fédération Motocycliste de Belgique
- Bosnia and Herzegovina — Bosanskohercegovački Auto-Moto Klub
- Bulgaria — Българска Федерация Мотоциклетизъм
- Croatia — Hrvatski Motociklisticki Savez
- Cyprus — Κυπριακή Ομοσπονδία Μοτοσυκλέτας
- Czech Republic — Autoklub České republiky
- Denmark — Danmarks Motor Union
- Estonia — Eesti Mootorrattaspordi Föderatsioon
- Finland — Suomen Moottoriliitto r.y.
- France — Fédération française de motocyclisme
- Georgia — Georgian National Motorsport Federation
- Germany — Deutscher Motor Sport Bund e. V.
- Greece — Automobile and Touring Club of Greece
- Hungary — Magyar Motorsport Szövetség
- Iceland — Motorcycle and Snowmobile Sports Association of Iceland
- Ireland — Motor Cycle Union of Ireland (includes Northern Ireland)
- Israel — Israel Motorsport Federation
- Italy — Federazione Motociclistica Italiana
- Kazakhstan — Automotorsport Federation of the Republic of Kazakhstan
- Latvia — Latvijas Motosporta Federācija
- Liechtenstein — Liechtensteiner Motorrad-Verband
- Lithuania — Lithuanian Motorcycle Sport Federation
- Luxembourg — Motor Union du Grand Duché de Luxembourg
- Malta — Assocjazjoni Sport Muturi u Karozzi
- Moldova — Federatia de Motociclism Din Republica Moldova
- Monaco — Moto Club de Monaco
- Montenegro — Auto-moto Savez Crne Gore
- Netherlands — Koninklijke Nederlandse Motorrijders Vereniging
- North Macedonia — Avto Moto Sojuz na Makedonija
- Norway — Norges Motorsportforbund
- Poland — Polski Związek Motorowy
- Portugal — Portuguese Motorcycling Federation
- Romania — Federatia Romana de Motociclism
- Russia — Motorcycle Federation of Russia
- San Marino — Federazione Sammarinese Motociclistica
- Serbia — Auto-Moto Savez Srbije
- Slovakia — Slovenská Motocyklová Federácia
- Slovenia — Avto-Moto Zveza Slovenije
- Spain — Real Federación Motociclista Española
- Sweden — Svenska Motorcykel- och Snöskoterförbundet
- Switzerland — Fédération Motocycliste Suisse
- Turkey — Turkish Motorcycle Federation
- Ukraine — Federation Motorcycling of Ukraine
- United Kingdom — Auto-Cycle Union (excludes Northern Ireland)

== Africa ==
- Algeria — Fédération Algérienne des Sports Mécaniques
- Angola — Federação Angolana de Desporto Motorizado
- Botswana — Botswana Motor Sport
- Ivory Coast — Fédération Ivoirienne de Sports Automobile et Motocyclisme
- Egypt — Automobile and Touring Club of Egypt
- Libya — Libyan Motorcycling Federation
- Kenya — Motorcycle Sports Federation of Kenya
- Madagascar — Fédération Malagasy de Motocyclisme
- Mauritania — Fédération Mauritanienne des Sports Mécaniques
- Morocco — Fédération Royale Marocaine de Motocyclisme
- Mozambique — Federação Moçambicana de Automobilismo e Motociclismo
- Namibia — Namibia Motor Sport Federation
- South Africa — Motorsport South Africa
- Tunisia — Fédération Tunisienne de Motocyclisme et Activités Associées
- Uganda — Federation of Motorsport Clubs of Uganda
- Zambia — Zambia Motor Sport Association
- Zimbabwe — Motorsport Zimbabwe

== Asia ==
- United Arab Emirates — United Arab Emirates Motorcycle Club
- Bahrain — Bahrain Motor Federation
- Cambodia — Cambodia Motor Sports Federation
- China — 中国摩托车运动协会网
- Guam — Guam Motorcycle and ATV Corporation
- Hong Kong — Hong Kong Automobile Association
- India — The Federation of Motor Sports Clubs of India
- Indonesia — Ikatan Motor Indonesia
- Iran — Automobile & Motorcycle Federation of I.R. Iran
- Iraq — Iraq Automobile and Motorcycle Club
- Jordan — Royal Motorcycle Club of Jordan
- Japan — Motorcycle Federation of Japan
- South Korea — Korea Motorcycle Federation
- Kuwait — Kuwait International Automobile Club
- Lebanon — Lebanese Motorcycles Club
- Sri Lanka — Federation of Motorcycle Sports in Sri Lanka
- Macau — Automovel Clube de Macau China
- Malaysia — Motorsports Association of Malaysia
- Mongolia — Mongolian Automobile Motorcycle Sports Federation
- Nepal — Nepal Automobile Sports Association
- Philippines — National Motorcycle Sports and Safety Association
- Qatar — Qatar Motor and Motorcycling Federation
- Saudi Arabia — Saudi Arabian Motor Federation
- Singapore — Singapore Motor Sports Association
- Syria — Syrian Automobile Club
- Thailand — Federation of Motor Sports Clubs of Thailand
- Tajikistan — Auto-Moto Federation of Tajikistan
- Taiwan — 中華賽車會

== North America ==
- Canada — Canadian Motorcycle Association
- United States — American Motorcyclist Association
- Barbados — Barbados Motoring Federation

== Latin America ==
- Argentina — Confederación Argentina de Motociclismo Deportivo
- Bolivia — Federación Boliviana de Motociclismo
- Brazil — Confederaçao Brasileira de Motociclismo
- Chile — Federación de Motociclismo de Chile
- Colombia — Federación Colombiana de Motociclismo
- Costa Rica — Moto Club de Costa Rica
- Cuba — Federación Cubana de Motociclismo
- Dominican Republic — Federación Dominicana de Motociclismo
- Ecuador — Federación Ecuatoriana de Motociclismo
- El Salvador — Federación Salvadoreña de Motociclismo
- Guatemala — Federación Nacional de Motociclismo de Guatemala
- Honduras — Federación Hondureña de Motociclismo
- Mexico — Federación Mexicana de Motociclismo A.C.
- Nicaragua — Unión Nicaragüense de Motociclismo
- Panama — Unión Panameña de Motociclismo
- Paraguay — Federación Paraguaya de Motociclismo
- Peru — Federación Peruana de Motociclismo
- Puerto Rico — Federación de Motociclismo de Puerto Rico
- Uruguay — Federación Uruguaya de Motociclismo
- Venezuela — Federación Motociclista Venezolana

== Oceania ==
- Australia — Motorcycling Australia
- New Zealand — Motorcycling New Zealand

== Worldwide ==
- WorldSBK (WorldSSP/WorldSSP300)
- MotoGP (Moto2/Moto3)
