= Motorcycling New Zealand =

Motorcycling New Zealand, formerly The New Zealand Auto-Cycle Union, is the governing body for motorcycle sport in New Zealand.

The New Zealand Auto-Cycle Union commenced operation in 1916 through the union of separate North and South Island Unions. It was renamed Motorcycling New Zealand (MNZ) in 1994. In 2016 it reported having 3,589 members, and hosting 568 events attended by 35,798 riders and over 100,000 spectators.
