= Broadsiding =

Method used in motorcycle speedway

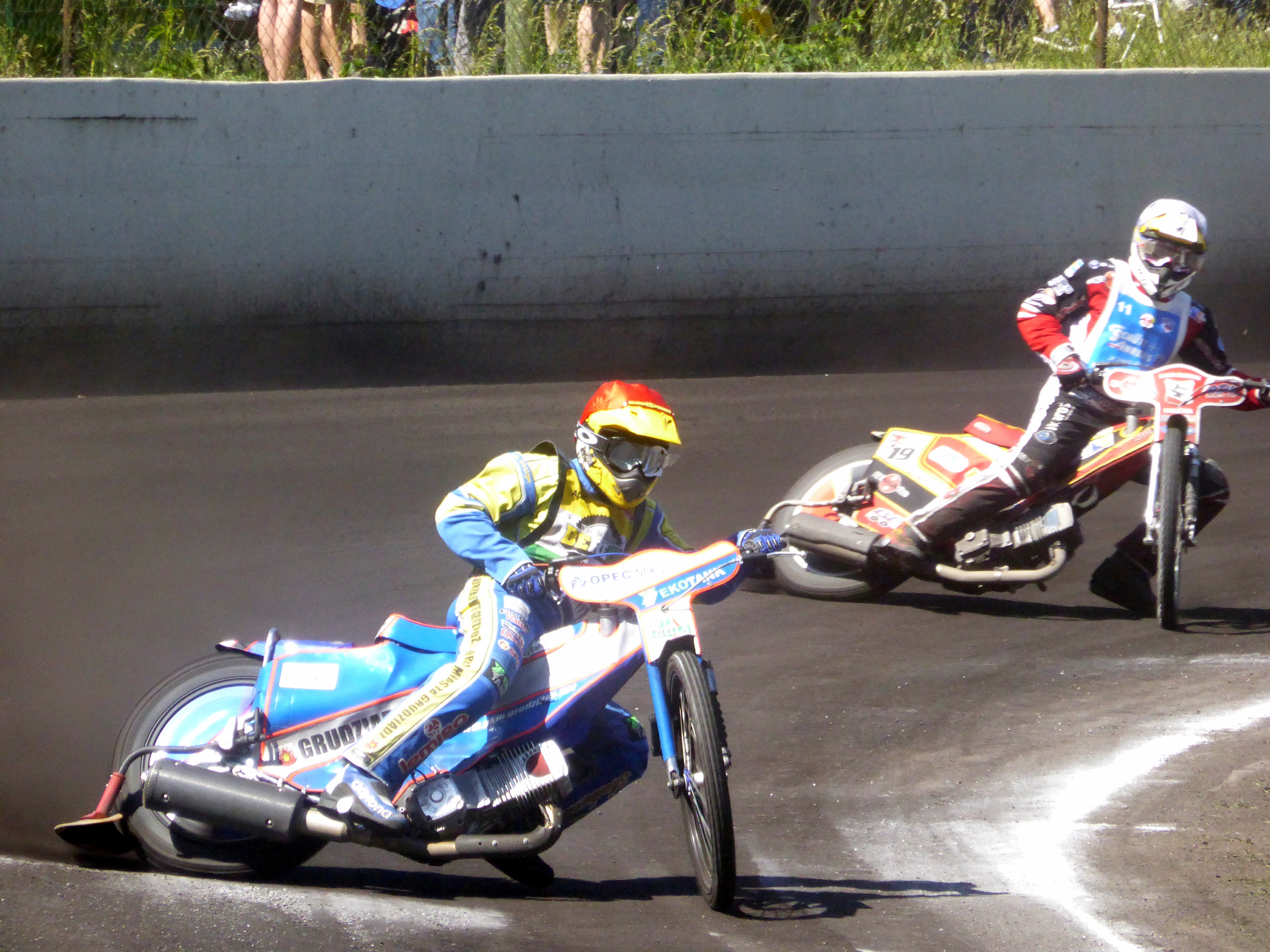
Riders sliding their bikes around a bend

Broadsiding is the method used in motorcycle speedway for travelling round the bends on the speedway track. The rider skids their rear wheel by spinning it at such a speed that it sets up a gyroscopic action, and this opposes the natural tendencies of centrifugal force. Then they control the slide by throttle control to maintain, increase or decrease the rate of which the rear wheel spins. Motorcycle speedway bikes have no brakes or suspension. The rider can reduce speed while still providing the drive to power the bike forward and around the bend.
