= Dicky Case =

Australian speedway rider (1909–1987)

- Born: 7 June 1909; Toowoomba, Queensland
- Died: 24 December 1987 (aged 78)
- Nationality: Australian

Career history
- 1930–1932: Wimbledon Dons
- 1933: Coventry
- 1934: Lea Bridge
- 1934: Walthamstow Wolves
- 1935–1937: Hackney Wick Wolves
- 1938: Wembley Lions

Team honours
- 1936: London Cup winner

Roy George Arthur Case (7 June 1909 Toowoomba, Queensland - 24 December 1987) was an Australian international speedway rider who finished sixth in the 1936 Speedway World Championship, the first ever final.

== Career ==
Case worked for the Queensland Railway Company before taking up speedway. He first came to the UK in 1930 and joined the Wimbledon Dons. He finished third in the 1932 Star Riders' Championship, the forerunner to the Speedway World Championship and also represented Australia in several Test Matches. He travelled to Germany in 1931 with Max Grosskreutz to promote speedway there, but the venture was short-lived due to opposition from the government. Along with Billy Lamont, Case was unbeaten by an opposing rider throughout the whole 1932 Test series against England.

In 1933, Case joined the Coventry and became the club captain but missed the last match of the season after contracting Diphtheria. In 1934, he joined Lea Bridge, and when they folded mid-season, transferred to Walthamstow Wolves and stayed with them when the promotion transferred the operation to Hackney Wick Stadium and becoming the Hackney Wick Wolves at the start of the 1935 season. He was the Wolves captain and top points scorer in 1935 and repeated the feat in 1936, as well as riding in the inaugural Speedway World Championship final at Wembley.

In 1937, Case was beaten to the top spot in the Hackney team by Cordy Milne but announced he was retiring from the sport. However, in 1938 Case joined the Wembley Lions but had a poor season due to injuries and did actually retire.

The Wolves dropped down a division in 1938 and after injury to the captain Frank Hodgson in the 1939 season, they announced that Case would be making a comeback to cover for the injured skipper. However, after a fall in his first ride which left him with an injury to force him to withdraw from the meeting, although he did complete his second ride, he retired from speedway for the final time.

== World final appearances ==
- 1936 - (England) London, Wembley Stadium - 6th - 17pts

== Training school ==
Whilst at Hackney, Case took over the sixty acre estate of Rye House and set up a training school at Rye House, operating under the name of the Hackney Motor Club. The school operated until 1938 when Rye House entered the Sunday Dirt-track League.

During World War II, most speedway racing had ended but Rye House managed to promote several. 1940 saw 'Dick Case's Speedway' run six meetings and another fourteen in 1942.

After the war ended, Case continued to run a training school at Rye House. He also owned the local hotel and public house that was next door to the track.

== Players cigarette cards ==
Case is listed as number 5 of 50 in the 1930s Player's cigarette card collection.
