= Jack Ormston =

British motorcycle speedway rider (1909–2007)

- Born: 30 October 1909; West Cornforth, England
- Died: 22 June 2007 (aged 97); Darlington, England
- Nationality: British (English)

Career history
- 1929-1932: Wembley Lions
- 1934: Birmingham Bulldogs
- 1935-1938: Harringay Tigers

Individual honours
- 1930: London Riders' Champion

Team honours
- 1932: National League Champion
- 1930, 1931: Southern League Champion
- 1931, 1932: National Trophy Winner
- 1930, 1932, 1935: London Cup Winner

John Glaholme Ormston (born 30 October 1909 in West Cornforth - died 22 June 2007) was a motorcycle speedway rider who finished runner-up in the Star Riders' Championship in 1935, the forerunner to the Speedway World Championship. He also competed in the first ever World Final in 1936 (finishing equal fifth). He earned 14 international caps for the England national speedway team.

== Career ==
Having ridden for Middlesbrough, Ormston left in 1929 to become captain of the Wembley Lions team aged 21. While riding for Wembley, he won the first ever London Riders' Championship at the Crystal Palace as well as the Southern League twice and the London Cup. He won the inaugural National League with Wembley in 1932 and was a member of the England team in the first-ever England v Australia Test Match at Wimbledon Stadium. He rode for England in a total of 13 Test matches against Australia, the first in 1931 and of which three were in Australia in 1937–38.

Ormston subsequently joined Birmingham (Hall Green) in 1934, and then from 1935 to 1938 rode for the Harringay Tigers in London.

Ormston was the last surviving competitor from the original World Final before he died aged 97.

== World Final Appearances ==
- 1936 - (England) London, Wembley Stadium - 6th - 17pts
- 1938 - (England) London, Wembley Stadium - 12th - 9pts

== After retirement ==
After Ormston retired from speedway at the end of the 1938 season, he became an established racehorse trainer, with over four hundred winners to his credit before he retired from training in 1976.

== Players cigarette cards ==
Ormston is listed as number 34 of 50 in the 1930s Player's cigarette card collection.
