= Roger Frogley =

British motorcycle speedway rider

- Born: 13 July 1908; Ware, Hertfordshire, England
- Died: 30 June 1974 (aged 65); Essex, England
- Nationality: British (English)

Career history
- 1930-1932: Crystal Palace Glaziers
- 1935: New Cross Lambs

Individual honours
- 1929: Star Riders' Champion

Team honours
- 1931: London Cup winner

Roger Frogley (13 July 1908 in Ware, Hertfordshire – 30 June 1974) was a pioneering British motorcycle speedway rider. He earned three international caps for the England national speedway team and was the 1929 Star Riders' Champion.

== Career ==
Frogley rode for the Crystal Palace Glaziers the majority of his career. He made his debut on 14 April 1928 at High Beach motorcycle speedway located inside of Epping Forest; the track was behind The King's Oak public house. A special trophy was put forth that year for the first, fourth place riders to win races at more than 39 mph. The trophies were won by Roger, his brother Buster, Joe Francis, and Arthur Willimott.

Roger and Buster Frogley rode modified 1928 Dirt Track Rudge motor bikes. In 1929, Roger Frogley rode in forty races, winning eighteen of them. Most significantly, he won the "Home" Star Riders' Championship at Wimbledon Stadium on Monday 21 October, making him the first British Star Rider.

Frogley was the top scoring rider for England, with six points, in the first England versus Australia Test Match at Wimbledon Stadium, Plough Lane, in 1930. He was part of the Crystal Palace team that won the 1931 London Cup.

Frogley retired in 1932, due to a loss of form. and made an unsuccessful comeback at New Cross Lambs in 1935.

In later life, Frogley was a successful businessman and lived in a house on Stapleford Airfield with his wife Sonja and his children William and Tanya. He was a keen aviator and sailor. He was a friend of Rupert "Bob" Simpson (having been in the RAF together, Roger being an RAF instructor) a pilot with BOAC and fellow boating enthusiast.

Frogley suffered from a gastric ulcer and died from cancer of the colon in the 1970s.
