= Albert John Hunting =

Albert John Hunting (died 1946) was an inventor and entrepreneur in Australia. He is best known for his development of motor racing tracks (speedways), the first being in Sydney in 1925. He was featured in the Magnificent Makers exhibition at the State Library of Queensland in 2018. Hunting retired from speedway work in 1932 and began a toy manufacturing business with his son. He had a wife, with whom he had four daughters and a son. Hunting died in September 1946.
