= Speedway World Championship =

Motorcycle speedway competition

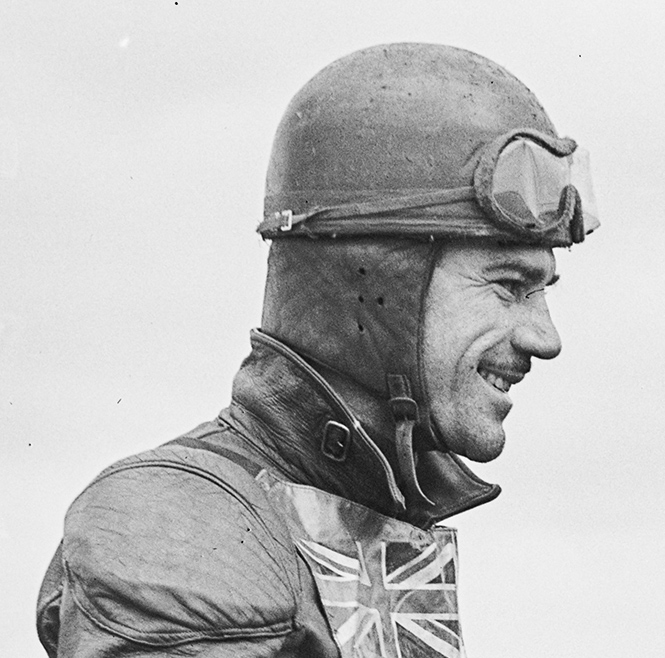
Lionel van Praag, first official world champion

The World Championship of Speedway is an international competition between the highest-ranked motorcycle speedway riders of the world, run under the auspices of the Fédération Internationale de Motocyclisme (FIM). The first official championships were held in 1936.

Today, the championship is organised as a series of Speedway Grand Prix events, where points are awarded according to performance in the event and tallied up at the end of each season. However, up to 1994, it was usually run as a single-night event after qualifying rounds during the season, leading up to a final consisting of 20 heats, where points were awarded according to riders' heat placings and then tallied up at the end.

Before the World Championship received its formal recognition from the ACU and the FIM in 1936, other unofficial Speedway World Championships were staged between 1931 and 1935, in Europe, South America and Australasia, such as the Star Riders' Championship.

== Unofficial World Championships ==
Star Riders' Championship From 1929 until 1935, the Star Riders' Championship was considered the unofficial World Championships, featuring riders from Great Britain, Australia and the United States. The event was arguably the closest format to the first World Championship in 1936 because it was at the same venue (Wembley) and contained the majority of the world's leading riders, including two of the first three official world champions. Additionally in 1931, the Promoters Association initiated a match race competition for the 'Individual World Championship' matching first the top Australian rider against the best Englishman over a 'best of three' series. A month later that winner next met another challenger for his world title. After the event was raced however, the SCB refused to recognise the title, and it subsequently became the 'British Individual Championship', but the season's winner held still the trophy inscribed "World Champion".

World Championship Series During the 1930/31 season A.J.Hunting's International Speedway Ltd staged a World's Championship Series in Argentina, at one of their Buenos Aires tracks during the second season of Dirt Track racing in Argentina. Culminating in February 1931, it was run as a series of eliminating match races between local and visiting British, USA and Australian riders.

Dirt Track Championnat du Monde An Anglo-French promotion syndicate ran an annual Dirt Track Championnat du Monde for five years from 1931 until 1935. It was held at the Stade Buffalo in Paris. The format comprised eight to twelve riders drawn from Europe, United Kingdom, Australia and USA, competing initially in 2-man Match Races, (1931–1933); then later, nine 3-man races. Details of these French staged unofficial World Championships, - "Dirt Track Championnat du Monde" - are as follows:

- 1931 October 11th – 1. Billy Lamont (Australia), 2. Ray Tauser (USA), 3. Charles Bellisent (France).
- 1932 August 28th – 1. Bluey Wilkinson (Australia), 2. Charles Bellisent (France), 3. Leopold Killmeyer (Austria).
- 1933 October 8th – 1. Fernand Meynier (France), 2. Bluey Wilkinson (Australia), 3. Billy Lamont (Australia).
- 1934 September 30th – 1. Claude Rye (England), 2. Dicky Case (Australia), 3. Leopold Killmeyer (Austria).
- 1935 September 1st – 1. Claude Rye (England), 2. Mick Murphy (Australia), 3. Charles Bellisent (France).

Australia's World's Championship A Johnnie Hoskins' Anglo/Australian promotion staged a 'World's Championship Final' at the Sydney Showground Speedway (Speedway Royal) on 4 March 1933 following qualifying rounds in Perth (Claremont Speedway) on 2 December 1932, Adelaide (Wayville Showground) on 2 January, Melbourne (Exhibition Speedway) on 28 January, and Sydney (Royal) on 18 February. A squad of 7 riders, 5 Australian and 2 English, competed over 7 races (3 riders per race,) the top point scorer, English rider Harry Whitfield, becoming World Champion. The riders who qualified for the Final were Lionel Van Praag, Bluey Wilkinson, Dicky Smythe, Billy Lamont and Jack Chapman (Australia), with Harry Whitfield and Jack Ormston from England. The 1934 event was cancelled after the initial qualifying meeting was rained off.

== Official World Championship ==
=== 1936 to 1954 – ACU (FICM) Championships ===
Wembley, London. With minor modifications, the general system stayed the same from the first official championship. There were initial qualifying rounds, where the riders raced in heats of four to score points against each other (3 for first place, 2 for second place, 1 for third place). The final qualifying round was called the Championship Round, and it consisted of seven to ten meetings, though no one participated in all of them. The 16 who scored the most points then qualified for the World Championship Final at Wembley, where the heat system was again used - this time with a total of 20 heats of four riders, each rider racing five heats, and every rider meeting each other at some point during the competition. The same points system was used, and the rider with the most points won. From 1936 to 1938 bonus points were carried over from the Championship Round. This was scrapped when the World Championship resumed after the World War II in 1949.

=== 1955 to 1994 – FIM Championships ===
Wembley and beyond. In 1955, the World final organisers recognised that it was no longer practical for the foreigners to travel to the Championship round races in Britain, and so a system with zonal qualification races was invented. The Nordic countries Finland, Denmark, Sweden and Norway had their own qualifiers; Austria, Netherlands, Germany, Poland, Soviet Union and Czechoslovakia had the "continental" qualifiers; and the best riders met for European Championships, all organised in roughly the same way as the World final was before. The Championship Round for British, Australian and New Zealand racers, however, was kept until 1960, after which the first World Final outside London was staged in Sweden, in 1961. Finals in Poland, and later USA, Germany, Denmark and the Netherlands followed. The number of British & Commonwealth participants reduced over time, with quotas from each nation/continent varying, depending upon which nation hosted the championship final.

=== 1995 to present – SGPs ===
Grand Prix Series. Gradually, it became apparent that the single-night event was getting obsolete, and a Grand Prix series similar to that used in Formula One and MotoGP was implemented in 1995 - while the system with qualifiers and a final was now used to qualify riders for the next Grand Prix series. Initially, there were six races, in Poland, Austria, Germany, Sweden, Denmark and Great Britain. The old system with everyone racing each other was still used, however, except that the four best riders qualified for a final heat which would determine who won the individual event (and score maximum points). Points were awarded as follows:

- 25 for the winner, then 20, 18, 16, 14, 13, 12, 11, 9, 8, 7, 6, 4, 3, 2, and 1 for 16th

This system was used until 1998, when FIM invented another system. Instead of 16 riders racing for points and trying to qualify for a final, there would now be 24 riders, divided into two classes. The eight best directly qualified for the so-called Main Event, while the sixteen others would be knocked out if they finished out of the top two in 4-rider heats on two occasions – while they would go through if they finished inside the top two on two occasions. This resulted in 10 heats, where eight riders proceeded to the Main Event, where exactly the same system was applied to get eight riders to a semi-final. The semi-finals were then two heats of four, where the top two qualified for a final and the others raced off in a consolation final. This system meant that the point system had to be revised, with 5th place getting 15 points, 6th 14, 8th 10, and after that 8, 8, 7, 7, etc. Places after 8th place were awarded according to the time a rider was knocked out and, secondly, according to position in the last heat he rode in.

This system went largely unchanged until 2004 (with the consolation final having been abolished in 2002), although the number of GP events was increased to ten in 2002 and then changed back to 9 in 2003 and 2004. However, the system was viewed by many as too complicated, and for the 2005 Speedway Grand Prix season the system used from 1995 to 1997 was back, but with one minor modification; points gained in the heats would now count for the aggregate standings, and the top eight riders would qualify for two semi-final heats, just like the 1998–2004 system. In 2020, the points system was again changed with overall positions deciding total championship points scored and points scored in individual heats again deciding overall positions in Grands Prix.

== History ==
=== Dirt track pioneers ===
Businessman A.J. Hunting was a dirt track speedway pioneer, promoting first in Australia in 1926, then Great Britain in 1928, but it was in his second season in Argentina, at the Huracan Stadium, Buenos Aires in 1930/31, that he ran his first, and the world's first, World Championship competition. Arranged over a season-long series of eliminating Match Races, America's Sprouts Elder was the first Championship winner. In the following European season of the same year Australian Billy Lamont took the "Championnat du Monde" in Paris, followed by fellow countryman Arthur "Bluey" Wilkinson the next year. But these two stars of the Dirt Track could only manage podium places behind Brit Harry Whitfield when a 'World's Championship' was staged on their home soil in 1933. Meanwhile, in the UK Jack Parker had replaced Aussie Vic Huxley as the 'Individual World Champion' but after the event the Speedway Control Board refused to honour the title put up by the promotion. Englishman Claude Rye took the Paris title twice before the Wembley event subsequently emerged in 1936.

=== Humble beginnings ===
The British pride themselves on organising the official World Championship, having hosted the first fifteen ACU/FIM-sanctioned events, all in Wembley Stadium. These were from 1936, when Australian Lionel Van Praag won the title, to 1938 and from 1949 to 1960. 1937 saw Americans Jack Milne, Wilbur Lamoreaux and Cordy Milne sweep the podium for the first win for America and the first time riders from one country took all 3 top positions. It was also the last American victory until 1981. Commonwealth countries dominated, with the UK, Australia and New Zealand taking four titles each up to 1959, including the first two time and back to back winner, Australia's Jack Young who won in 1951 and 1952. The first non-English-speaking victor came in 1956, when the Swede Ove Fundin won the first of his five titles. The late 1950s and 1960s were dominated by Fundin along with the two New Zealanders Ronnie Moore (two titles) and Barry Briggs (four titles), and Englishman Peter Craven (two titles).

=== Mauger's era ===
Then, at the 1966 World Championship in Gothenburg Ivan Mauger, a 26-year-old New Zealander who had had a slow breakthrough in British league speedway, made his debut. He finished fourth, but won two out of five races, and showed potential by winning the European final (without Swedes) at Wembley. He raced until the age of 39, winning six World titles, including three in a row from 1968 to 1970 - including nine successive races in finals events. After 1970, Ole Olsen took over – winning in Göteborg in 1971 and eventually taking three titles. However, Mauger had the last laugh of the two – winning the last final that they both competed in, at Chorzów in 1979, when he scored 14 out of 15 possible points to win the final ahead of Pole Zenon Plech.

=== Danes take over ===
After American Bruce Penhall won twice in 1981 and 1982 - the latter being the first and only time a World Championship race has been hosted in the United States, in Los Angeles – it was time for Denmark to ascend the world control of speedway. Earlier on, only Ole Olsen had won World titles, in 1971, 1975 and 1978, but a new generation was growing up, led by Erik Gundersen and Hans Nielsen who occupied the first two places at Gothenburg in 1984. There were two Danes on top of the table in each and every World final from 1984 to 1989 – a somewhat extraordinary record. Gundersen and Nielsen took three titles each as the Danes won six successive and seven out of eight titles from 1984 to 1991. However, the forced retirement of Gundersen in 1989 following a horrific crash in the Speedway World Team Cup Final in Bradford, followed by 1991 champion Jan O. Pedersen in 1992, both prematurely because of serious injuries, weakened Danish speedway somewhat, as only Nielsen held the class required to win the World Championship. He did in 1995, the first year of the Speedway Grand Prix series - scoring 103 points and winning one of six races (fellow Dane Tommy Knudsen actually won two, but was too inconsistent and finished tenth), fifteen points more than his nearest opponent. He was pipped to the title by two points by America's Billy Hamill in 1996, and although he continued racing until 1999 and was still winning Grands Prix, he never threatened the top.

=== Speedway Grand Prix ===
The previous, single meeting World Final, was held in the UK or Europe, except in 1982 when it was in the USA. The Speedway Grand Prix series events have to date been staged in the UK, Europe, Australia and New Zealand.

It was Sweden, represented by Tony Rickardsson, the 1994 champion, who took over. Rickardsson won four titles from 1998 to 2002, only interrupted by Mark Loram in 2000. Englishman Loram has the dubious honour of being the first (and so far only) SGP World Champion not to win a Grand Prix during his championship year, though his consistency in reaching the Semi-final at each event and being runner-up in the first 2 rounds saw him score enough points to defeat Hamill and Rickardsson. Although Dane Nicki Pedersen and Australian Jason Crump won in 2003 and 2004 respectively, Rickardsson was hampered by injury and unlucky draws through many of the Grand Prix races and was often in contention for the title. The 2005 Speedway Grand Prix series, however, saw Rickardsson return, taking his sixth victory to equal the record of Ivan Mauger. The 2006 Grand Prix was again won by Jason Crump who amassed a total of 188 points to lead the field throughout the championship. Rickardsson announced his retirement from the sport half way through the 2006 campaign.

In 2007, Nicki Pedersen once again regained the title he first won in 2003, with a total of 196 points, while Leigh Adams finished his nearest rival on 153. Nicki Pedersen won the 2008 series for a third time, while Jason Crump picked up the silver medal, and Pole Tomasz Gollob finished third. Crump would win his third title in 2009 before Gollob became just the second Polish rider to win the world title in 2010 following on from Jerzy Szczakiel's surprise win in 1973. American Greg Hancock, the 1997 champion, won his second championship in 2011 at the age of 41 to become the oldest champion, while Australia added another World Crown when Chris Holder raced to the 2012 championship with 160 points to defeat Pedersen on 152 and Hancock on 148. Tai Woffinden gave England its first champion since Mark Loram when he won the SGP in 2013, while Greg Hancock won the 2014 World Championship at the age of 44. In 2015 Woffinden would again win the World Championship despite a late season surge from 45 year old Hancock.

Hancock once again won the World Championship in 2016. Australian Jason Doyle had led the standings for the majority of the year, succumbing to injury before the last couple of rounds, saw Hancock win his fourth World Championship. Doyle would eventually become World Champion in 2017, his first ever medal. Tai Woffinden would become a three-time champion in 2018. Bartosz Zmarzlik would become World Champion for the first time in 2019, and the third ever Polish World Champion. Zmarzlik has won record-equalling six-time World Champion (2019, 2020, 2022, 2023, 2024 and 2025),

== See also ==
- World Championship Medals Table
- Under-21 World Championship
