= Star Riders' Championship =

Motorcycle speedway championship, 1929–1935

The Star Riders' Championship was the forerunner of the Speedway World Championship and was inaugurated in 1929. The competition was sponsored by The Star, which was a London evening newspaper at that time.

For the first year it was split into two sections, Britain and Overseas, as it was felt that the Australians and Americans were too strong for the British riders.

The format changed over the years until by 1935 it was run in the 16 riders 20-heat formula that was to become the recognised formula for the World Championship and most other individual events until the advent of the Grand Prix in 1995. When the World Championship was inaugurated in 1936, the Star Riders' Championship ceased.

== Results ==
1929-1935

Year	1st	2nd	3rd
1929	(Overseas) Frank Arthur ( (Australia) ) beat Vic Huxley ( (Australia) )		
1929	(Britain) Roger Frogley ( (England) ) beat Jack Parker ( (England) )		
1930	Vic Huxley ( (Australia) ) beat Frank Arthur ( (Australia) )		
1931	Ray Tauser ( (United States) )	Vic Huxley ( (Australia) )	Tommy Croombs ( (England) )
1932	Eric Langton ( (England) )	Vic Huxley ( (Australia) )	Dicky Case ( (Australia) )
1933	Tom Farndon ( (England) )	Ron Johnson ( (Australia) )	Bluey Wilkinson ( (Australia) )
1934	Jack Parker ( (England) )	Eric Langton ( (England) )	Ginger Lees ( (England) )
1935	Frank Charles ( (England) )	Jack Ormston ( (England) )	Max Grosskreutz ( (Australia) )
Year	1st	2nd	3rd
