= Vic Huxley =

Australian speedway rider (1906–1982)

- Born: 23 September 1906; Brisbane, Queensland
- Died: 24 June 1982 (aged 75); Brisbane, Queensland
- Nationality: Australian

Career history
- 1930–1931: Harringay Canaries
- 1931–1936: Wimbledon Dons

Individual honours
- 1930: Star Riders' Championship
- 1934: Australian Champion
- 1936: London Riders' Championship
- 1931: Dirt Track Championnat du Monde

Victor Nelson Huxley (23 September 1906 – 24 June 1982 in Brisbane, Queensland) was an Australian speedway rider who won the Star Riders' Championship, the forerunner of the Speedway World Championship, in 1930 and finished runner-up in 1931 and 1932.

== Career ==
Huxley won the Dirt Track Championnat du Monde (an early version of the Speedway World Championship and rival of the Star Riders' Championship) at Stade Buffalo in Paris during 1931.

Huxley won the 1934 Australian Championship (3 Laps) in front of his home crowd at the Brisbane Exhibition Ground.

Huxley won the London Riders' Championship in 1936, whilst with the Wimbledon Dons but retired from British speedway at the end of the 1936 season and returned to Australia where he rode in the Winter test series against England. He lived in Ashgrove in Brisbane, and set up a motorcycle business in Adelaide Street called the "British Motorcycle Corporation" which he ran until the mid-1960s.

Huxley died in his home town of Brisbane on 24 June 1982 at the age of 75, just three months shy of his 76th birthday.

== World Final appearances ==
1937 cigarette card illustration

- 1936 – (England) London, Wembley Stadium – 8th – 17pts

== Players cigarette cards ==
Huxley is listed as number 20 of 50 in the 1930s Player's cigarette card collection.
