= Motorcycle speedway =

Motorcycle sport

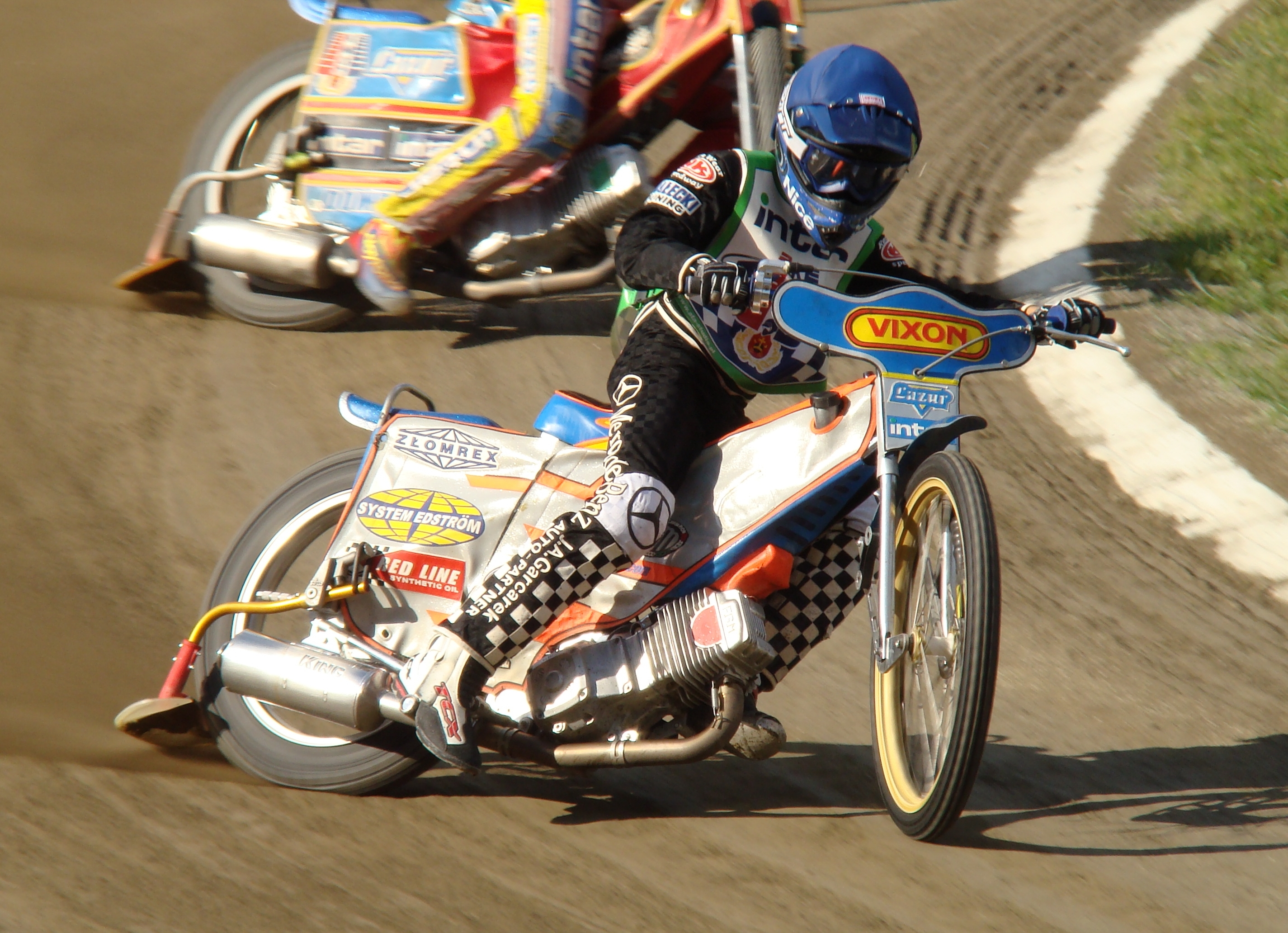
- A speedway rider on the track
- Highest governing body: Fédération Internationale de Motocyclisme
- Nicknames: Speedway
- First played: 1923

Characteristics
- Contact: Contact
- Type: Outdoor and indoor

Presence
- Olympic: No
- World Games: Invitational: 1985 and 2017

Motorcycle speedway, usually referred to simply as speedway, is a motorcycle sport, a variety of track racing, involving four and sometimes up to six riders competing over four anti-clockwise laps of an oval circuit. The motorcycles are specialist machines that use only one gear and have no brakes. Racing takes place on a flat oval track usually consisting of dirt, loosely packed shale, or crushed rock (mostly used in Australia and New Zealand). Competitors use this surface to slide their machines sideways, powersliding or broadsiding into the bends. On the straight sections of the track, the motorcycles reach speeds of up to 70 miles per hour (110 km/h).

There are now both domestic and international competitions in a number of countries, including the Speedway World Cup, whilst the highest overall scoring individual in the Speedway Grand Prix events is pronounced the world champion. Speedway is popular in Central and Northern Europe and to a lesser extent in Australia and North America. A variant of track racing, speedway is administered internationally by the Fédération Internationale de Motocyclisme (FIM). Domestic speedway events are regulated by FIM-affiliated national motor sport federations.

== History ==
Col Stewart races his speedway motorcycle wearing a leather helmet, c. 1930.

The early history of speedway race meetings is a subject of much debate and controversy. There is evidence to show that meetings were held on small dirt tracks in Australia and the United States before World War I. On 13 November 1905 motorcycle racing was held at the Newcastle NSW Rugby Ground, a distance of approximately 440 yards.

American rider Don Johns was known to have used broadsiding before 1914. It was said that he would ride the entire race course wide open, throwing great showers of dirt into the air at each turn. By the early 1920s, Johns' style of cornering was followed in the United States, where it was called Short Track Racing, by riders such as Albert "Shrimp" Burns, Maldwyn "Floppy" Jones and Eddie Brinck.

Motorcycle Speedway can be traced back to the early 1920s. One track that staged speedway, amongst others, was at the West Maitland Showground, whose first speedway meeting was staged on 15 December 1923. This track had a motorcycle riding entrepreneur as its Secretary and his personal account has him inviting his friends and their associates to do a few laps one Sunday morning; the noise attracted the attention of the Showground committee and approval to race at the "Electric Light Festival" was won. Motorcycle racing under lights was a huge success and its promoter was New Zealand-born John S. Hoskins. These pioneers introduced the Speedway signatures of No Left Footpeg and the Steel Shoe, ironically fashioned from worn coal shovels, manufactured in this Steel region.

Following the success of Maitland, Speedway meetings were conducted at Newcastle Showground in 1924. These events were very successful and led to the construction of Newcastle Speedway off Darling Street, Hamilton. Johnnie Hoskins became the Secretary of Newcastle Speedway Ltd. The Newcastle Herald reported the Grand Opening on 14 November 1925 attracted an audience of 42,000 at that time it was approximately one-third of Newcastle's entire population.

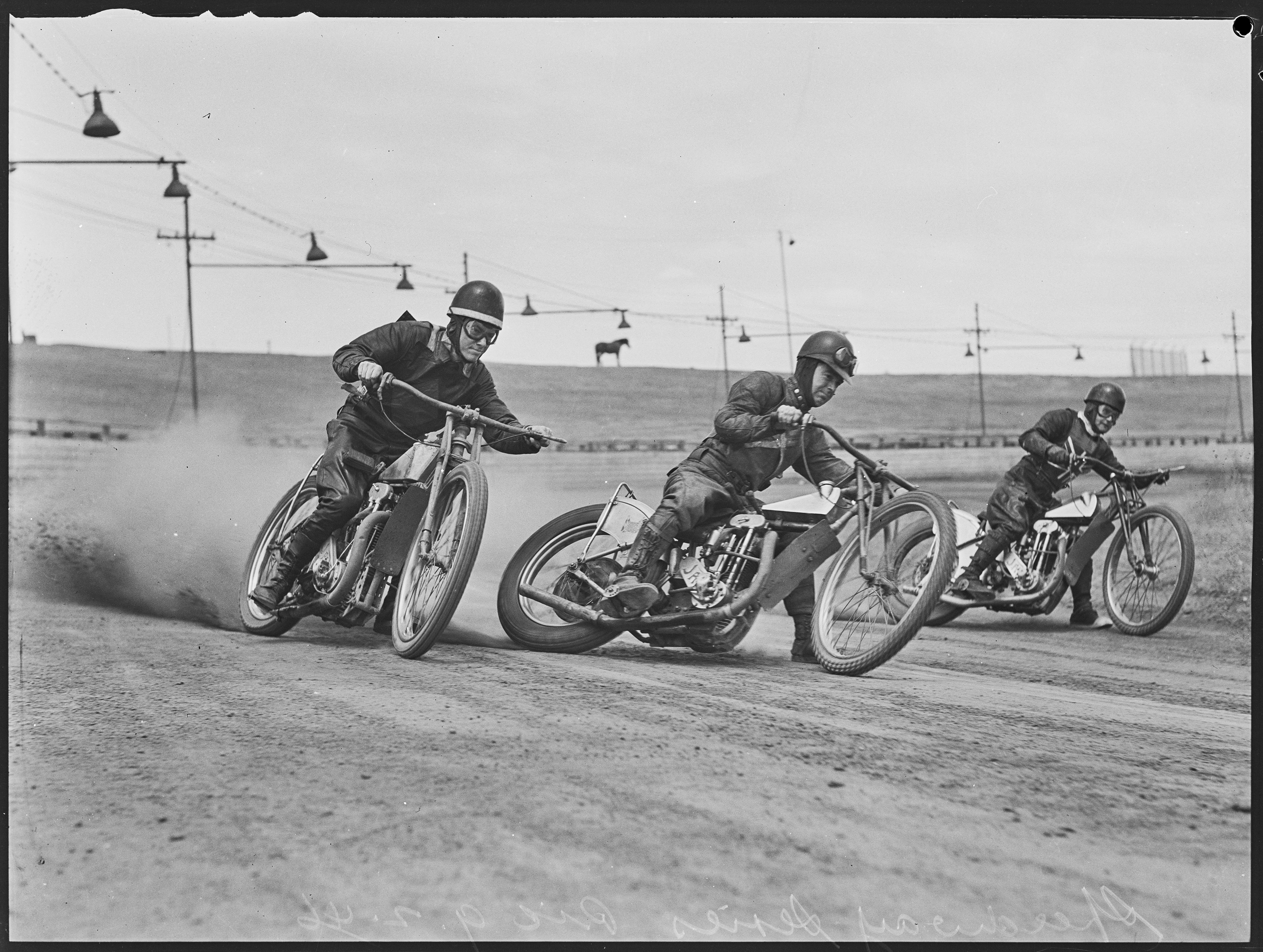
Speedway riders, Sydney, 9 February 1946, by Ray Olsen, Pix Magazine photographer.

After Maitland, Newcastle Showground is the second oldest Motorcycle Speedway track in the world. However, its first recorded motorcycle race was much earlier in 1908. The first Australian Motorcycle Speedway Championship was held at Newcastle Showground in 1926. Ironically it was won by American rider Cec Brown. Visiting English and American racers were common, for they were highly paid showmen, often winning a year's salary in just one night. It was very successful, so Newcastle Showground held the championship again in 1927. Very fitting that Newcastle Showground held the first National Speedway Championship anywhere in the world.

In 1926, Johnnie Hoskins took his Speedway show to Sydney's Royal Showground. A very wet Sydney summer nearly sent Hoskins broke, so he took the show on the road to Perth, where one good season made him wealthy again. He and his riders decided to take the show to England, as the word had spread about this exciting sport. 14 April 1928, Johnnie Hoskins, 13 Australian Riders and their motorcycles sailed from Perth on the passenger ship Oronsay to introduce Speedway Solo motorcycle racing to England.

The first meeting in the United Kingdom took place at High Beech Speedway on 19 February 1928. There are, however, claims that meetings were held in 1927 at Camberley, Surrey and Droylsden, Lancashire. Despite being described as "the first British Dirt Track meeting" at the time, the meeting at Camberley on 7 May 1927 differed in that the races were held in a clockwise direction. Races at Droylsden were held in an anti-clockwise direction, but it is generally accepted that the sport arrived in the United Kingdom when Australians Billy Galloway and Keith McKay arrived with the intention of introducing speedway to the Northern Hemisphere. Both featured in the 1928 High Beech meeting. The first speedway meeting in the UK to feature bikes with no brakes and broadsiding round corners on loose dirt was the third meeting held at High Beech on 9 April 1928, where Colin Watson, Alf Medcalf and "Digger" Pugh demonstrated the art for the first time in the UK. Proto speedway was staged in Glasgow at the Olympic Stadium (Glasgow Nelson) on 9 April 1928 and the first fully professional meeting was staged at Celtic Park on 28 April 1928. The first meeting in Wales was staged at Cardiff White City on Boxing Day 1928.

In the 1928–1929 season at the Melbourne Exhibition Speedway, Australian Colin Stewart won the prestigious Silver Gauntlet, which required the rider to win the feature race 10 times in one season. He won it 12 times. He also achieved success at an international level, racing for Southampton Saints in 1929 and captained Glasgow in the Northern League in 1930 before moving to Wembley Lions in 1931, for whom he rode in just four matches, averaging 4.00 points per match. He also raced in the 1930 Scottish Championship which was won by Wembley Lions' Harry Whitfield.

The forerunner of the World Championship, the Star Riders' Championship, was inaugurated in Great Britain in 1929, but was split into two sections, as it was felt that the British riders were not yet the equal of the Australians and Americans. Frank Arthur won the Overseas Section and Roger Frogley the British. The following year the two sections were amalgamated and Vic Huxley proved to be the winner. Huxley was also runner-up three times and won the first British Match Race championship in 1931.

Speedway racing typically took place on purpose-built tracks, although in Australia bikes shared larger speedways with Sprintcars, Speedcars (Midgets) and saloons, with tracks traditionally ranging from 1/3-mile showground tracks, such as the now-closed 520 metres (570 yd) Claremont Speedway in Perth and the 509 metres (557 yd) Sydney Showground, to smaller, purpose-built 300 metres (330 yd) long motorcycle tracks, such as Gillman Speedway in Adelaide and Mildura's Olympic Park.

== Speed ==
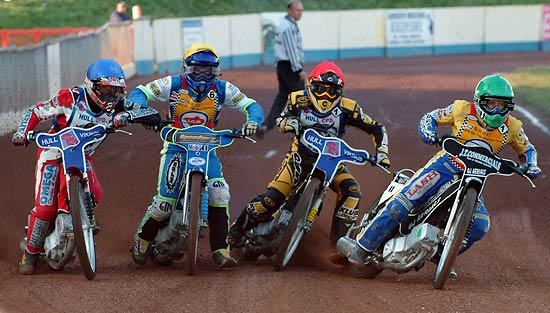
All 4 riders leaning into the first corner – note the elbows.

Each track is between 260 and 425 metres long and it takes approximately one minute to complete four laps. For example, 10 time Australian Champion Leigh Adams set a record time of 59 seconds on a 342 metres (1,122 ft) track and produced an average speed of 83 km/h (51.86 mph). The speed on straight sections of the track reaches 110 km/h (70 mph) or more on longer tracks, but the limited speed on curves lowers the average.

At the start of a race it takes between one and two seconds for the motorcycle to reach the "curve speed" (somewhat lower than the average), which is roughly estimated to be the equivalent of 2.5 to 3 seconds to reach 100 kilometres per hour (62 mph) (or 0 to 60 mph). The start of the race is an important aspect of the race overall. "Gating" correctly can help a rider gain an initial advantage over other riders but speed advantages can be made as a race progresses. Those riders willing to take a risk and opt for finding the grippy parts of the track rather than the race line, are sometimes rewarded with extra speed allowing them to pass other riders either on the outside or the inside.

== Track ==
Generic Speedway track layout

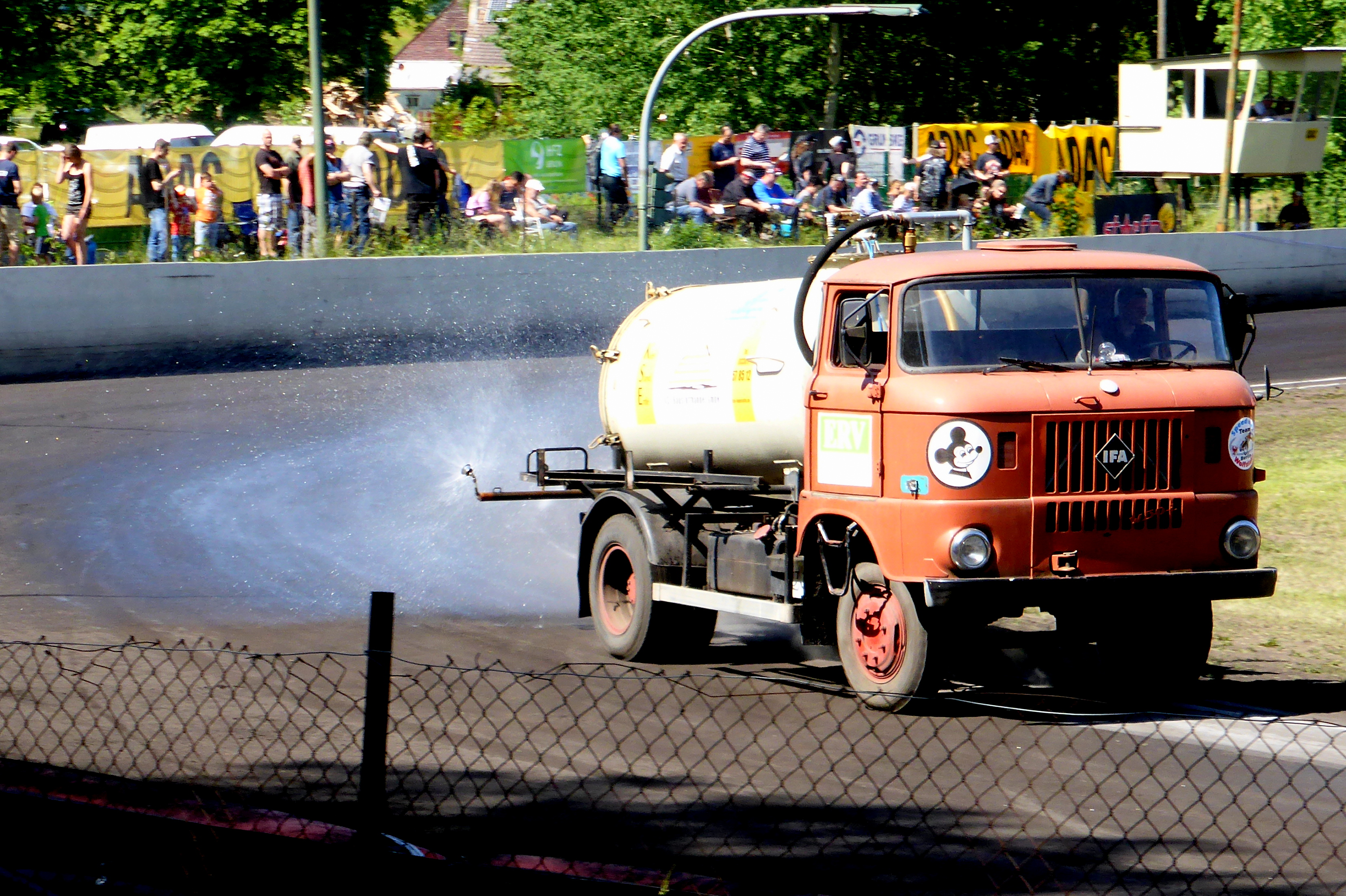
Track preparation: Watering the track to avoid excessive dust.

Tracks used for professional speedway racing are regulated by the Fédération Internationale de Motocyclisme (FIM) who provide rules concerning construction, size and safety requirements. Speedway racing takes place on a level oval track consisting of two straights joined by two semicircles. Tracks must be between 260 and 425 metres (853 and 1394 ft) in length, this is measured at a distance of 1 metre (3.3 ft) from the inner boundary. Tracks may be banked, but the gradient must under no circumstances exceed 5% in the straight, 10% in the bends, and must remain constant and grow from the inner edge to the safety fence. A white start line is marked across the track approximately mid-way along one of the straights. The starting area is also divided into four equal parts (known as gates) by white lines marked at right angles to the start line and extending back at least 1 metre (3.3 ft). Additional rules govern the placement of warning systems such as lights and also the construction of the starting mechanism. The minimum track width is 10 metres (33 ft) on the straights and the bends must be at least 14 metres (46 ft) wide. The minimum widths give each rider adequate space to safely navigate the track. The start line and starting gate assembly is halfway along one of the two straight sections of the track. Starting gates are simple spring-loaded mechanisms that raise two or three strands of tape to start the race.

The FIM regulations require licensed tracks to provide a garage or pit area for motorcycles as well as medical and press facilities. Track boundaries are marked by white lines or barriers on the inside and outside the track, any rider who crosses this boundary with both wheels will be disqualified unless they only did so in the interest of safety or were forced to by another competitor.

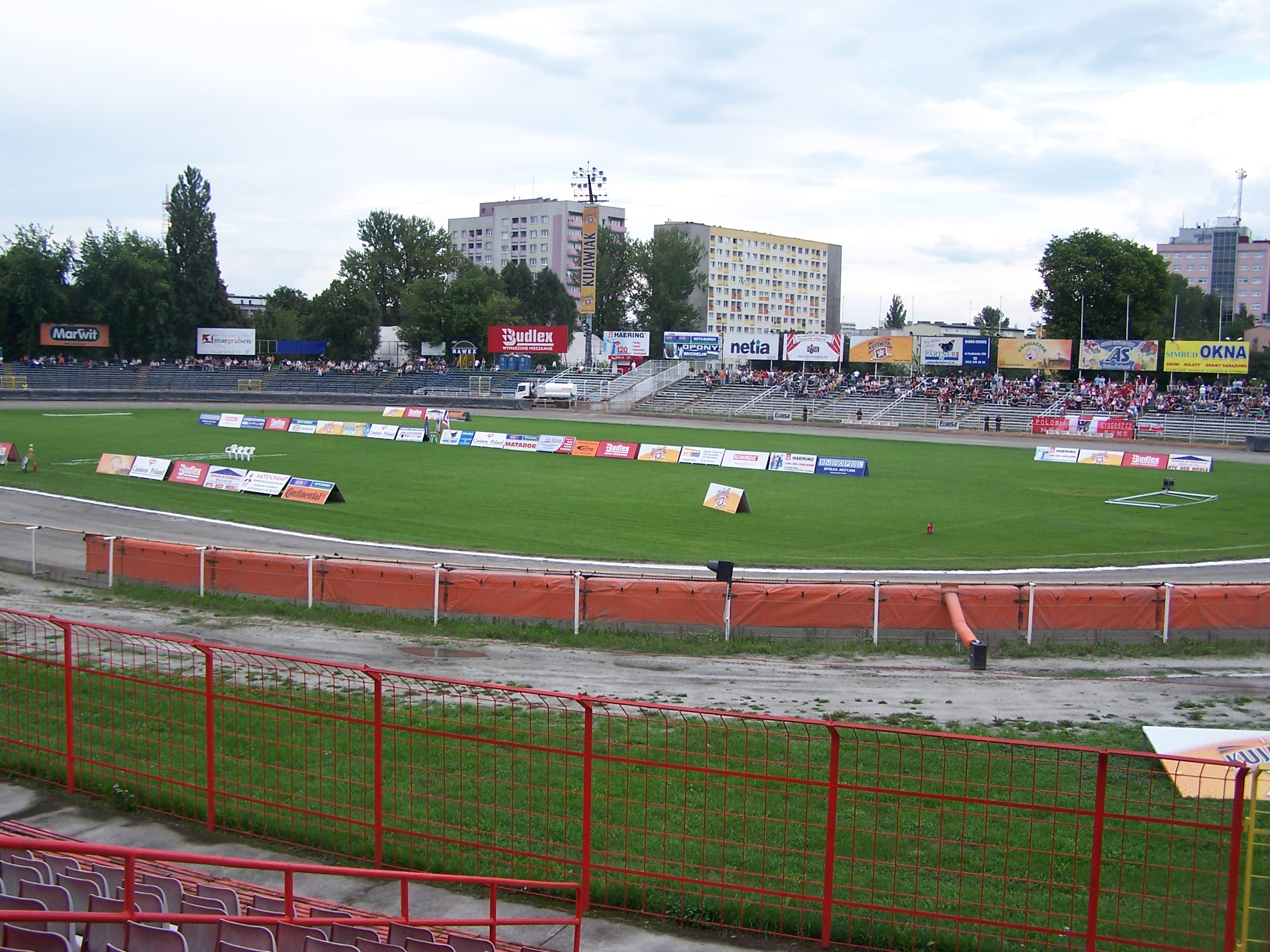
Stadion Polonii Bydgoszcz in Poland, a track using an air-fence

The track surface consists of four layers of grading. The topmost of which must be of shale, granite, brick granules or other loose material of which no individual piece can be over 7 millimetres (0.28 in) in size. Competitors use this surface to slide their machines sideways (powersliding or broadsiding) into the bends using the rear wheel to scrub-off speed while still providing the drive to power the bike forward and around the bend. The skill of speedway lies in the overall ability of the rider to control his motorcycle when cornering and thus avoid losing places through deceleration. The use of asphalt, concrete and tarmac for any layer is prohibited. The top layer must be levelled or "graded" at intervals during an event by tractors towing specially adapted rakes to evenly re-distribute the surface. Tracks are watered before and, if needed, during meetings to prevent the surface becoming too dry and to protect the public and the riders from dust.

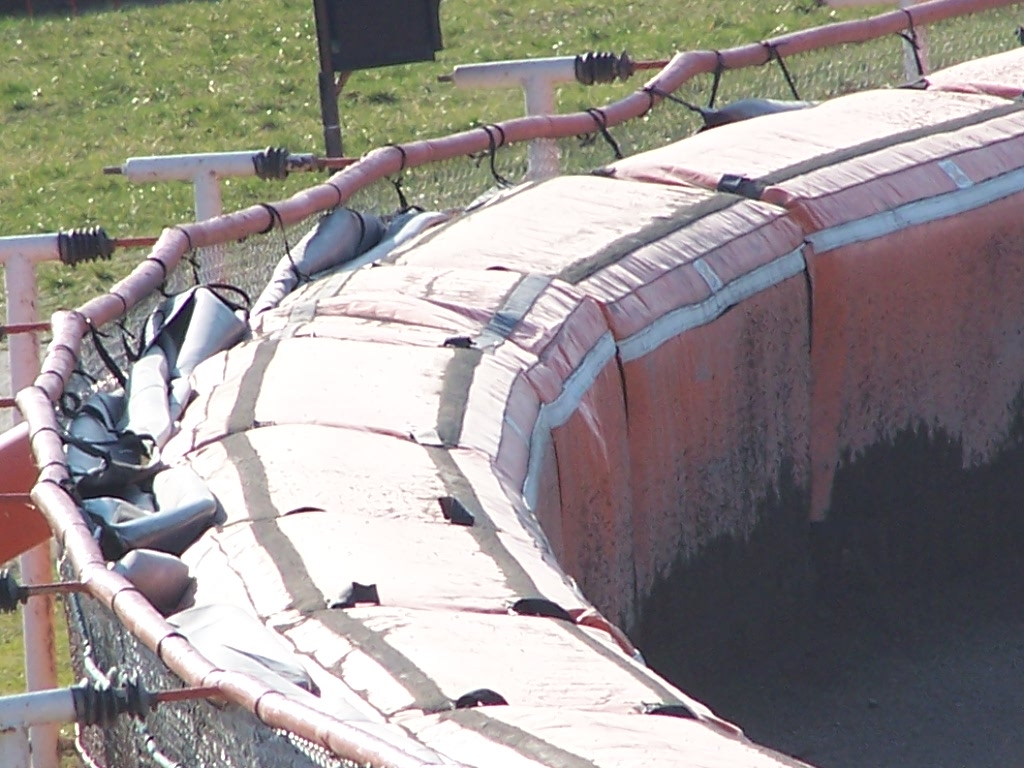
Air-fence close-up

Safety requirements include the use of suspended wire fences, air fences and wooden fences. Air fences are made up of inflated panels installed on the bends. The fence is designed to dissipate energy by allowing an impacted area to compress and transfer air into the rest of the fence through blow-off valves or restriction ports connected to the other sections. They are mandatory for tracks in the British Elite League, Polish Ekstraliga, Speedway Grand Prix and Speedway World Cup. Neutral zones outside the track provide safe run-off areas for riders and their machinery to minimise the potential risk of injury to spectators. The majority of tracks are dedicated to speedway or other sports such as sidecar speedway and banger racing. For larger events, the FIM occasionally sanctions the use of stadiums that install temporary tracks such as the British Grand Prix held at the Millennium Stadium in Cardiff.

== Motorcycles ==
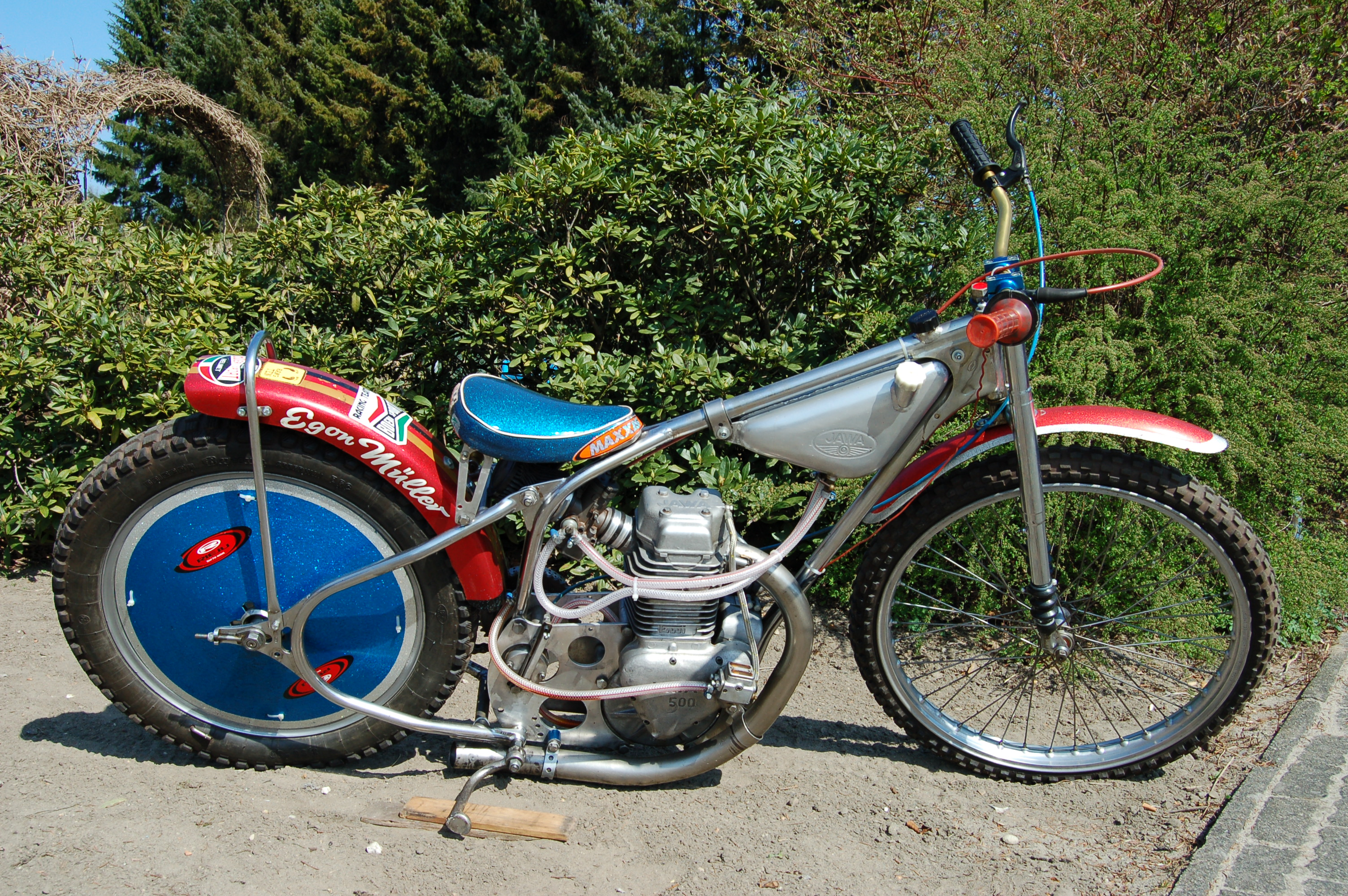
1983 World Champion Egon Müller's Jawa Speedway Machine with 500 cc engine

Speedway uses a unique type of motorcycle, governed by the FIM's "Track Racing Technical Rules". In the past, bikes with upright engines were used (the name taken from the way the engine sits in the frame), but today most professional riders use laydown bikes as it is argued that they are easier to handle. Speedway bikes have only one gear, so the clutch is only used to engage and disengage drive at the start and finish of races. Speedway bikes do not have conventional brakes, the broadside sliding technique on corner entry is used to slow them at the ends of the straights, their high compression engines also provide a reasonable level of engine braking. FIM regulations state that the motorcycles must have no brakes, are fueled by pure methanol, use only one gear and weigh a minimum of 77 kilograms (170 lb). By using engine and rear wheel sprockets the single gear ratio can be adjusted as required for track conditions. The use of methanol allows for an increased compression ratio to the engine producing more power than other fuels and resulting in higher speeds (approximately 130 kilometres per hour (81 mph) when cornering).

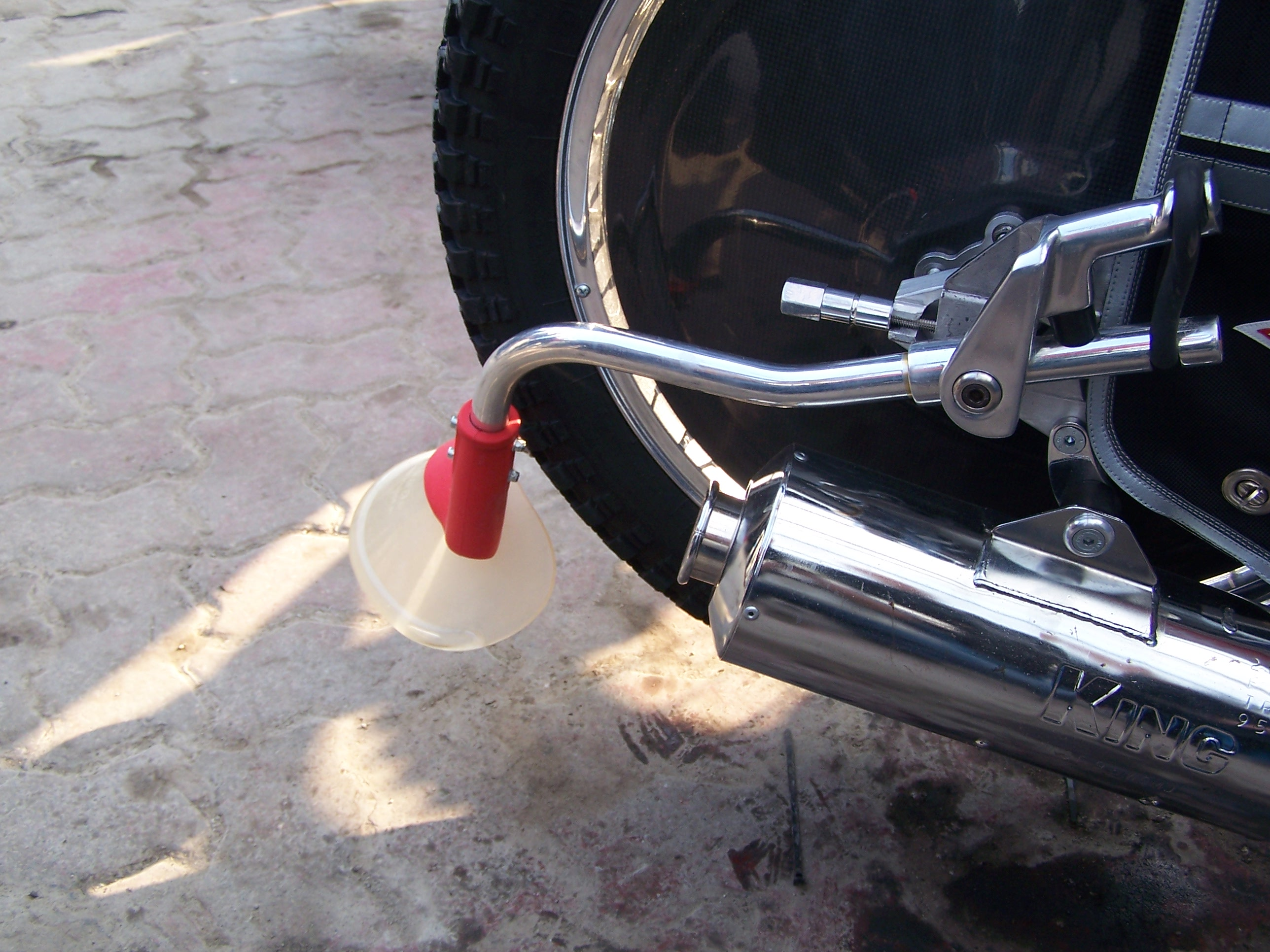
A dirt deflector fitted to a Speedway motorcycle

Machines used must:

- Weigh no less than 77 kg (dry mass)
- Use a four-stroke, single-cylinder engine with one carburettor and one spark plug and a maximum displacement capacity of 500cc
- Have guards fitted over moving engine parts where reasonable
- Use an additional chain guard to prevent a hand or fingers being cut at the nip point where the chain meets the sprocket by a chain
- Have a peg (Dutch Peg) fitted to prevent a broken primary chain flailing and injuring a rider or a fellow competitor
- Use shatter-resistant plastics where reasonable
- Be fitted with a dirt deflector
- Be fuelled by methanol with no additives
- Be fitted with an approved silencer
- Have a handlebar width greater than 650 mm and less than 850 mm.

Machines used cannot:

- Be constructed in any part from titanium
- Use uncoated ceramic parts
- Use telemetry during a race except for timing purposes
- Use any electronic components to control the engine
- Use brakes of any form
- Use air compressors of any kind.

In addition, all motorcycles must have a safety cut-out device fitted; this is defined as a switch that "must cut off the circuit of the electrical supply by the simple action of pulling a lanyard or a non-elastic string (with a maximum length of 30 centimetres (12 in)) attached to the rider's right wrist." The high compression ratio of the engine can also assist in slowing down a machine; if the throttle is closed, the engine may stop. Riders can stop the bike by deliberately laying down the bike on the track, and this technique is used to avoid riders who fall in front of pursuing opponents. Before cut-outs were introduced, an engine was stopped in an emergency situation by removing the plug lead from the spark plug or shutting off the fuel supply.

== Racing ==
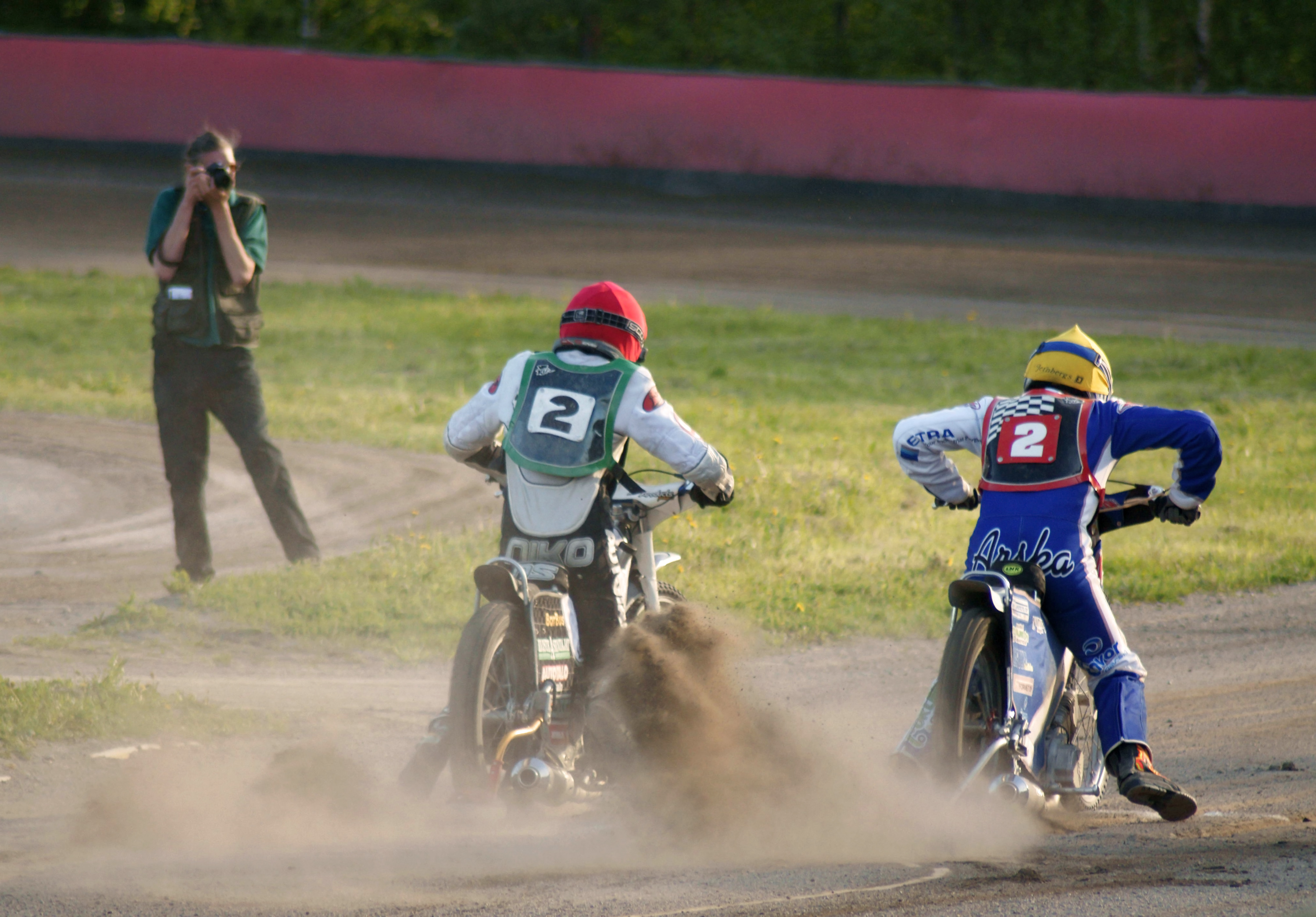
Riders in the start

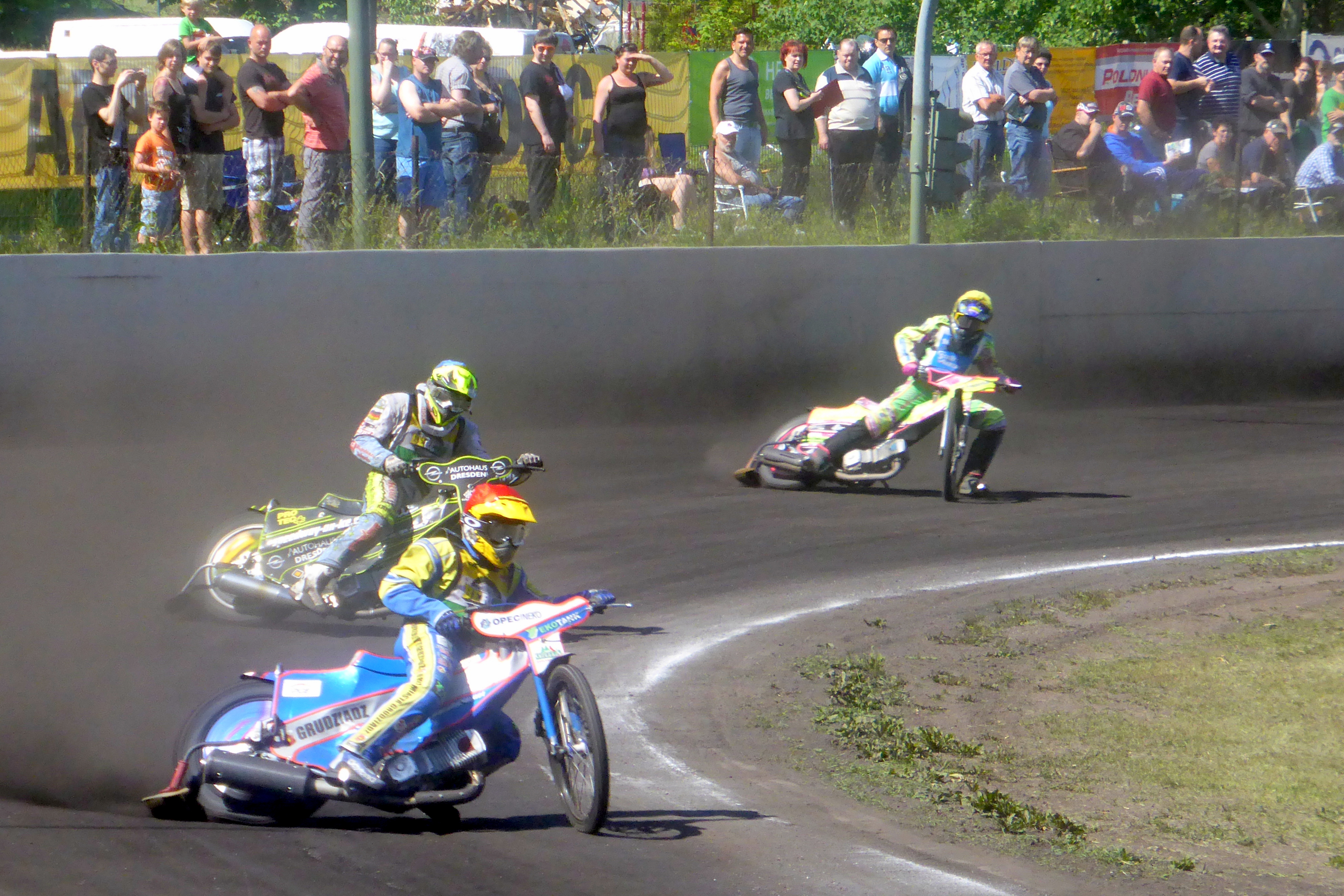
Broadsiding

Races (known as heats) consist of four riders racing over four laps from a standing start. Riders wear different coloured helmets, traditionally in team events red and blue denote home team riders, and white (in British speedway, green has previously been used as an alternative to white, apparently for early interactive TV) and yellow/black quartered colours (latterly plain yellow) denote visiting riders. The starting area is divided into a grid of four equal parts and the riders from each team must take their place in alternate grids or "gates". The colours also denote starting positions in individual events; Red is the inside gate (gate 1), blue starts from gate 2, white starts from gate 3 and yellow/black starts on the outside (gate 4). When an event dictates that there is a fifth rider at the start line, gate 3 is moved to the centre with a green helmet colour, and white and yellow (or yellow/black) take gates 4 and 5 respectively. Riders must be able to get their bikes to the start line under their own power, without any external assistance and not by pushing the machine, then line up in parallel.

A rider who is not at the start line within a reasonable period of time is also liable to be disqualified, although league matches in the UK allow teams to elect to start the disqualified rider fifteen metres back from the tapes or replace the disqualified rider with a team reserve. This period of time is standardised to two minutes from a time determined by the match referee and usually indicated by a bell, a rotating orange lamp or a digital clock readout. All riders must be at the tapes under their own power before the two minutes have elapsed. Additional time between races will be allowed by, and at the discretion of, the referee if a rider has two consecutive rides, to allow the rider time to prepare.

A starting gate consisting of two or more tapes is erected across the start line. The riders must situate themselves not more than 10 centimetres (3.9 in) from this and not touch it once the green light comes on, they must also remain stationary until the tapes are raised. Failure to do so is known as a tape infringement and can result in a false start being recorded and the rider penalised (disqualified, or in league matches in Great Britain, a 15-metre penalty or replace the disqualified rider with a team reserve). The race is started with the raising of the start tape mechanism operated by the match referee and the riders must proceed around the track in an anti-clockwise direction without both wheels illegally leaving the track boundaries.

Once a race is under way, no rider can receive outside assistance, including push-starts, from others. Historically, pushers were allowed at the start of the race. A white line at the 30-metre mark used to designate the extent to which a push was allowed but due to safety concerns, assistance is now illegal.

Occasionally races can consist of up to six riders but this is rare as most tracks are too narrow to accommodate the extra riders safely.

== Scoring ==
Speedway operates a sliding scale for scoring (known as the 3–2–1–0 method). Three points are scored for first place, two points for second place and one point for third place. A rider does not score when finishing fourth, or failing to finish, or if excluded from a race. These points accumulate over the competition, with riders points either counting towards individual or team placings. In the event of a tie, the race is commonly awarded as a dead heat. If it is a tie for first place, they will both receive two points. A tie for second place earns each rider one point while a joint-last finish earns each rider zero points. Teams can use a tactical substitute rule once in a meeting. If that team is eight (six in World Cup) or more points in arrears, they may bring in the use of a different rider in their team lineup, to race in any heat except for heat 15. This may be different in World cup or event racing. If they are ten or more points behind, a rider with a scheduled ride may go out for double points, in which the riders points will be doubled if he beats a rider of the opposing team. Any rider taking a tactical substitute ride or double points ride is denoted by a black and white helmet colour as rather than one of the four usual coloured helmets. If that rider remains unbeaten by either opposition rider his scored points are doubled and also count towards the rider's calculated match average (CMA).

Scoring for Heats with 4 riders
Place	Points
1st	3
2nd	2
3rd	1
4th	0

== Calculated match averages ==
The sport produces Calculated Match Averages (CMAs or averages) for every rider, these are calculated from the following:

$\left ( \frac{\hbox{Total points}}{\hbox{Total rides}} \right ) \times4$

CMAs scale from 3.00 to 12.00, any rider scoring above or below this range of values will be awarded the maximum or minimum respectively. These averages are used in leagues such as the Premiership in the UK to identify heat-leaders for the purposes of choosing which riders to enter for each race.

At the start of a season, a rider retains their last recorded CMA (or assessed CMA if they have never previously established one) until they have competed in six home and six away matches. A new CMA is then issued that comes into effect seven days later. These are subsequently updated on the 15th of every month from May onwards, and come into effect on the first of the next month.

These CMA's are used in most professional leagues and are altered or weighted depending on the league the rider gained the CMA in. A rider that has no recorded average will receive an indicative CMA for the start of the season that is assessed on their prior experience in the sport.

== Competitions ==
=== International ===
	World (Fédération Internationale de Motocyclisme)		Europe (UEM)
	Seniors	Juniors	Seniors	Juniors
Individual	World Individual (1936–1994); Grand Prix (since 1995)	World Individual U-21 (since 1977)	European Individual (since 2001)	European Individual U-19 (since 1998)
Pair	World Pairs (1970–1993)+(2013); Speedway of Nations (from 2018)	None	European Pairs (since 2004)	None
Team	World Team (1960–2000); World Cup (2001–2017, 2023)	U-21 World Cup (since 2005)	None	European Team U-19 (since 2008)

An international individual speedway championship has taken various forms since its beginnings in the 1930s, with the official World Championship first held in 1936. The present FIM Speedway Grand Prix (SGP) championship organised by Speedway Grand Prix (Discovery Sports Events since 2015) has taken place since 1995. The SGP uses a scoring system based on each riders overall final position. The rider who has gained the most points at the end of the tournament is declared the World Champion. Polish rider Bartosz Zmarzlik is the current (2025) World Champion. The annual British Grand Prix is currently held at the National Speedway Stadium in Manchester.

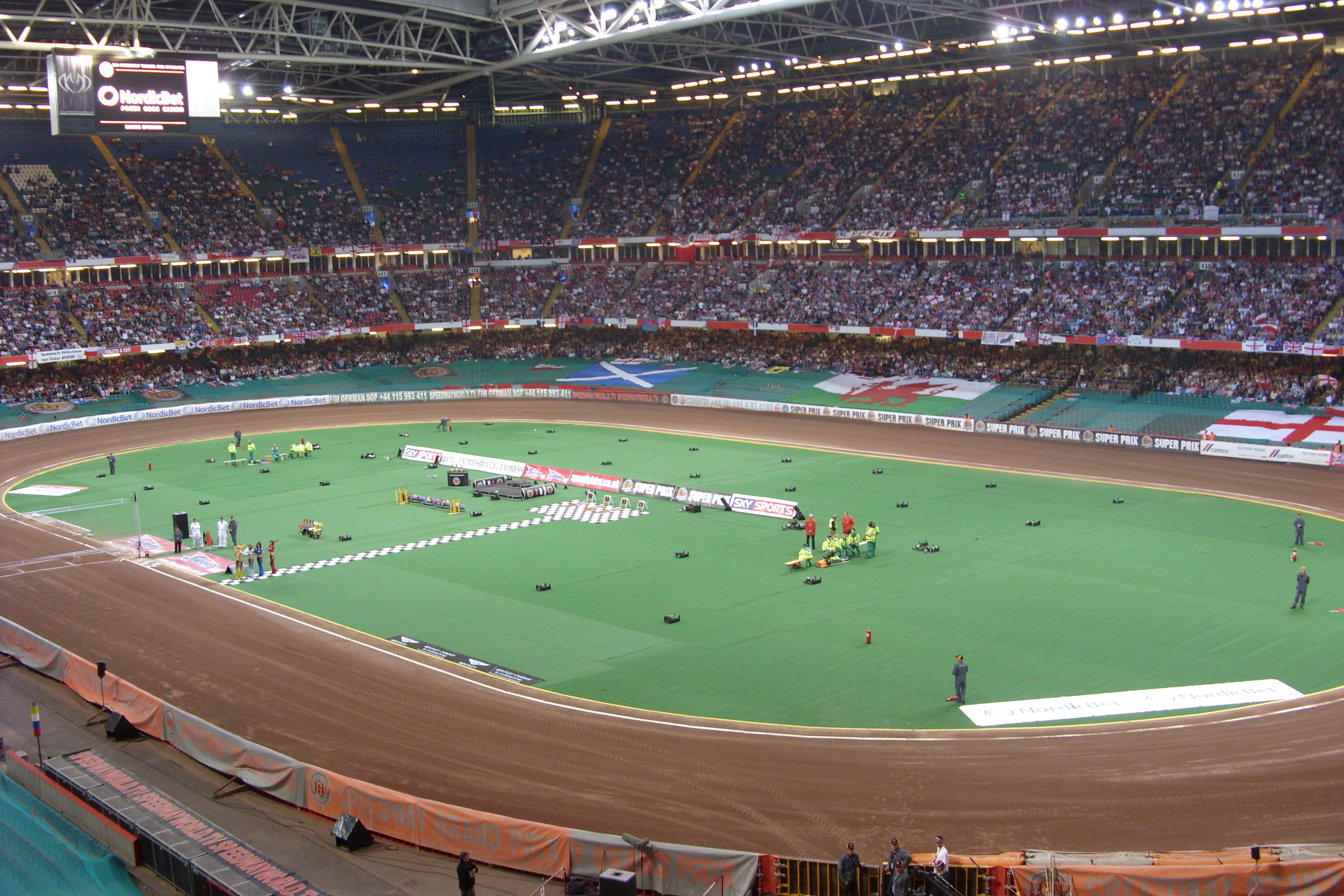
The Millennium Stadium, venue of the British Grand Prix

Scoring in Grand Prix events changed in 2005 with riders scoring 3–2–1–0 in their races and these points being carried forward to decide the winner of each Grand Prix. At the end of the series the highest scorer becomes the world champion.

World Speedway Champions include Ivan Mauger (six-time World Champion), fellow New Zealander Barry Briggs (four times), Ole Olsen (three times), Ove Fundin (five times), Lionel Van Praag (inaugural World Champion in 1936), Hans Nielsen (nicknamed "The Professor", four-time World Champion), Tony Rickardsson (six times), Erik Gundersen and Jason Crump, both three-time World Champions, and the sport's first two-time champion Jack Young who won in 1951 & 1952.

Currently, no world team championship is contested for senior riders. The first such championship was the Speedway World Team Cup, which was contested annually from 1960 to 2000. It was replaced by the Speedway World Cup, another annual event, in 2001. Both competitions featured teams from the major speedway countries, usually in a series of meetings over the space of a week in the summer.

The Speedway World Pairs Championship was an annual speedway event held each year in different countries. Competing countries picked their top two riders to represent them (or in some cases, those who were available). The first competition was held in 1970 and the final competition was held in 1993. From 1994 the World Pairs was merged with the World Team Cup. As of 2018, a new pairs championship, the Speedway of Nations, has now replaced the Speedway World Cup on the sport's calendar. The Speedway World Cup returned in 2023, replacing the Speedway of Nations for that year, and will be held again in 2026.

=== National ===
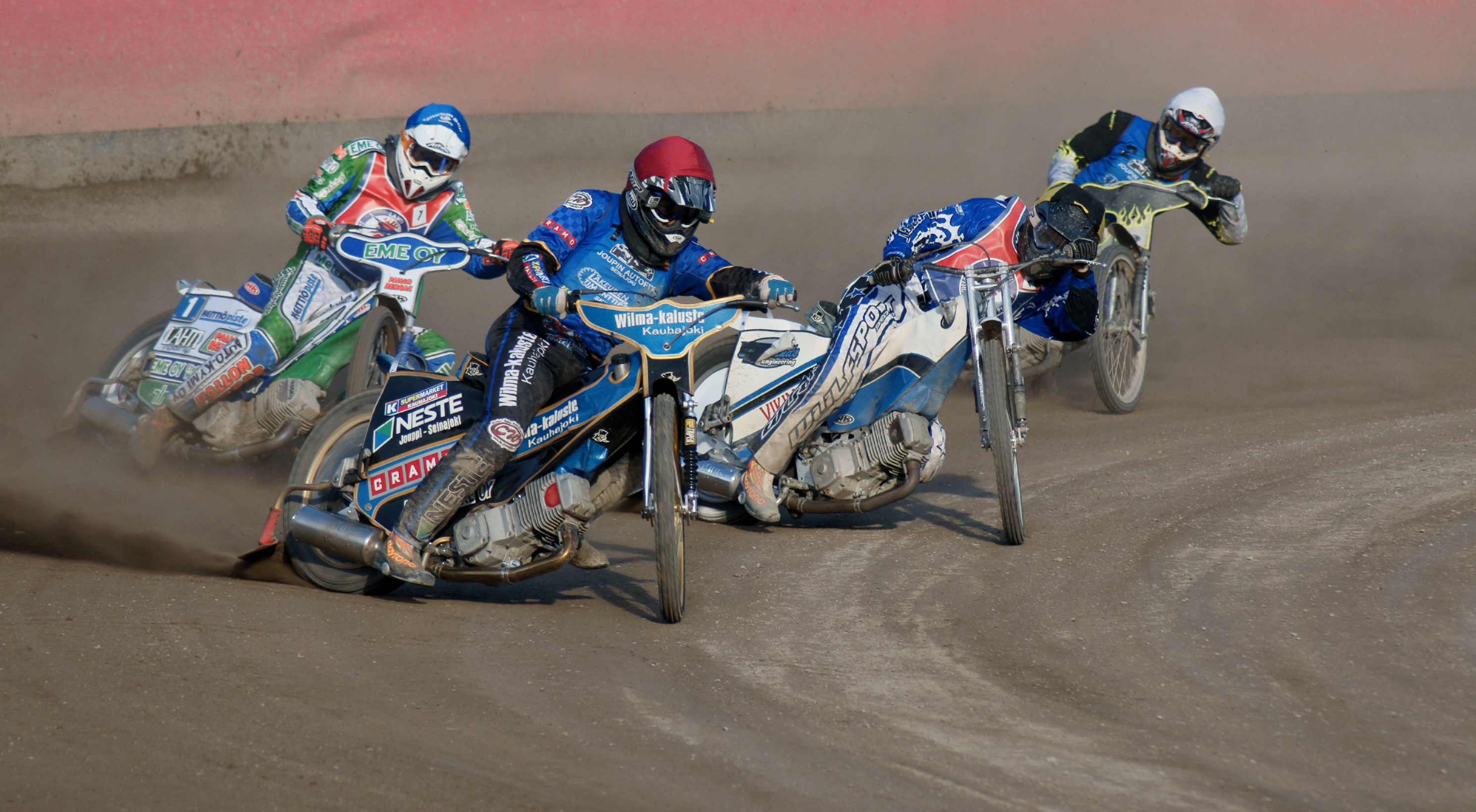
Finnish speedwayriders in Speedway Extraliiga

Most European countries run their own domestic speedway leagues. The FIM affiliated governing bodies in each country operate league systems, normally comprising several divisions, in which the teams gain points throughout the season depending on results. Teams are placed into tables, placing them in order according to points accrued. Most commonly, each team races every other team in its league at home and away in each season, in a round-robin tournament. Meetings traditionally consist of two teams riding against each other with four riders in each race with two home team riders and two away team riders. Meetings usually feature fifteen heats and each rider is scheduled to ride four or five times. The team with the most points at the end of the meeting is the winner. Most league seasons end with play-offs – a series of meetings between the highest finishing teams to determine a league champion. The champions may be promoted to a higher division and the team finishing at the bottom are in some countries relegated to a lower division.

The major speedway nations in Europe are the United Kingdom, Sweden, Poland and Denmark. These countries run a number of leagues and have regular fixtures throughout the traditional speedway season that runs from March to October. On a smaller scale, competitions are also held in Argentina, Australia, Austria, Belgium, Bulgaria, Canada, Croatia, Czechia, Finland, France, Germany, Hungary, Italy, Latvia, the Netherlands, New Zealand, Norway, Romania, Russia, Slovakia, Slovenia, South Africa, Ukraine and the United States. Some countries' top divisions feature highly paid star riders. In smaller countries and lower divisions, riders may be part-timers with a second job, or amateurs.

=== United Kingdom ===
The United Kingdom has three main domestic leagues, the SGB Premiership, the SGB Championship, and the National League, as well as three 'junior' amateur leagues. It also has a youth championship.

=== Poland ===
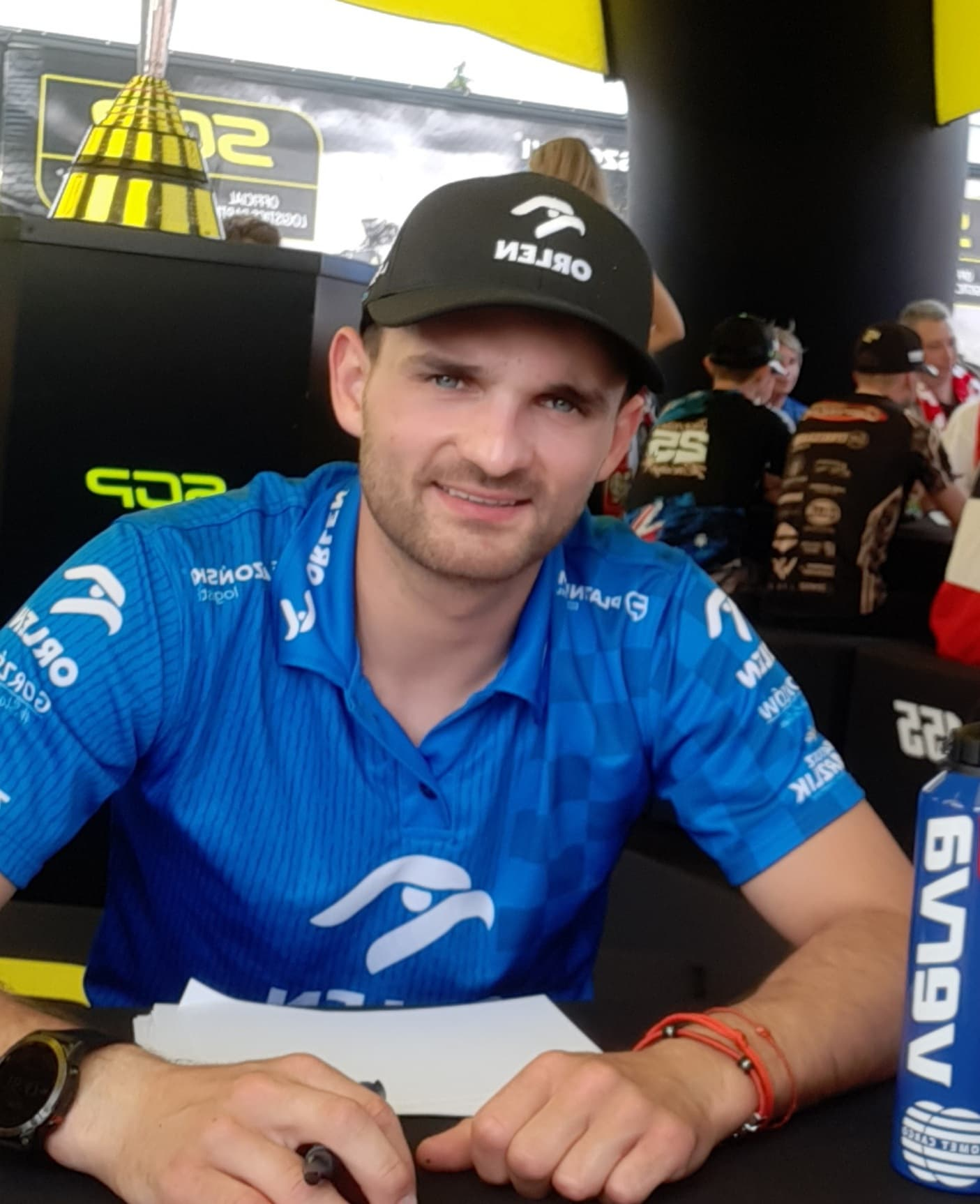
Bartosz Zmarzlik – a successful Polish speedway rider & sixfold world champion (2019-2020 and 2022–2025)

Speedway is one of the most popular sports in Poland and is governed by the Main Commission for Speedway Sport (Główna Komisja Sportu Żużlowego, GKSŻ) which is a part of the Polish Motor Union Polski Związek Motorowy (PZM). The PZM is a member of the FIM and the Union Européenne de Motocyclisme (UEM).

The Polish Extraleague has the second highest average attendances for any sport in Poland. The first speedway meetings in Poland were held in the 1930s and league racing began in 1948.

There are three championships in Poland: individual (IMP), pairs (MPPK) and team (the DMP consisting of three leagues). The Junior under-21 championships also has three competitions: individual (MIMP), pairs (MMPPK) and team (MDMP). There are three leagues: Extraleague, First League and Second League. In the 2022 season, the Extraleague and First League had eight teams competing and the Second League had seven teams. The GKSŻ organizes the Golden Helmet (Jerzy Szczakiel Memorial), Silver Helmet (Under-21) and Bronze Helmet (Under-19) competitions. Individual meetings such as the Criterium of Polish Speedway League Aces – Mieczysław Połukard Memorial, Alfred Smoczyk Memorial, Edward Jancarz Memorial, Jerzy Szczakiel Memorial and Individual international championship of the Ekstraliga named after Zenon Plech are also popular.

The Polish National team are the final champions of the now-defunct Speedway World Cup, having won the competition eight times in all. Poland has produced three Individual World Champions, Jerzy Szczakiel in 1973, Tomasz Gollob in 2010 and Bartosz Zmarzlik in 2019, 2020, 2022, 2023, 2024 and 2025.

=== Sweden ===
Speedway in Sweden is governed by the Swedish Motorcycle and Snowmobile Federation (SVEMO). The first Swedish speedway league was founded in 1948 and copied the British format of league racing, including adopting the Swedish version of several British teams nicknames.

The Elite League (Elitserien) was established in 1982 and has ten teams. At the end of each season the top four teams ride in the play-offs in semi-finals and a final and the winner of the final are the Elitserien champions. The team finishing bottom of the league are relegated to the National league (Allsvenskan). The Allsvenskan has seven teams and before the introduction of the Elitserien in 1982 was the top flight speedway league in Sweden. As with the Allsvenskan, the top four teams at the end of each season ride in the play-offs in semi-finals and a final. The Allsvenskan Division One is the third tier of Swedish speedway with seven teams. The team finishing the season in first place are champions and can apply for promotion to the Allsvenskan, subject to having suitable facilities and sufficient finances.

Other competitions include the Swedish Individual Championship and the Swedish Junior Individual Championship. The Swedish Individual Championship is contested by 18 riders in a Grand Prix format with 20 heats.

=== Denmark ===
Speedway in Denmark is administered by Danmarks Motor Union (DMU). The sport was introduced into Denmark in the 1930s but it didn't boom until the 1970s. Notable Danish speedway riders today include – Nicki Pedersen, Bjarne Pedersen and Hans Nørgaard Andersen. Former rider, Ole Olsen won the World Championship three times and his success helped popularise the sport in Denmark. Since retiring Olsen has become an FIM Speedway Grand Prix race director. A popular Danish rider in the 1960s was Arne Pander, and in the 1980s Erik Gundersen, Jan O Pedersen and Hans Nielsen (who was also an active racer through the 1990s).

==== League competitions ====
There are three leagues in Denmark.:

- Danish League (Dansk Speedway Liga)
- Division One
- Division Two

Speedway meetings are held between April and September. The Danish League (Dansk Speedway Liga) has six teams with meetings traditionally held on Wednesday evenings. At the end of each season the top four teams compete in the play-offs in semi-finals and a final. The winner of the final are the league champions. There is no promotion or relegation and membership of the Danish League is by application only. At the end of each season the top five teams in the Danish League compete in the Danish Super Cup, an end-of-season competition, held as a single event. It is hosted by the winning team from the previous season.

Both Division One and Division Two are the second and third tier and are mostly for amateur riders. Meetings are held on Saturdays with a mid-summer break. Division One can have a maximum of eight teams, with the remaining teams riding in Division Two. Meetings are staged using a four-team format. In principle, the team finishing bottom of Division One is relegated and replaced by the top team in Division Two as long as their parent club does not already have a team in Division One. However, this does not always happen for financial reasons. There is also no promotion and relegation if the bottom team in Division One and the top team in Division Two are operated by same club.

==== Other competitions ====
The Individual Speedway Danish Championship is a competition for riders holding a Danish passport and a valid DMU licence. Riders must submit their entries at least four weeks before the first meeting of the competition. Any riders who competed in the Speedway Grand Prix or World Championship Qualifying rounds during the previous season are seeded directly to the Final. The DMU may also seed other riders directly to the Final at their discretion. Either one or two semi-finals are staged depending on the number of riders entering the competition (excluding the seeded riders who go straight through to the Final). Riders are selected for these rounds according to the previous season's Danish averages. If one semi-final is held, the highest-placed riders (plus two reserves) qualify for the Final. If two semi-finals are held, the highest-placed riders (plus one reserve) from each meeting qualify for the Final. The winner of the Final is awarded a gold medal and declared Danish Individual Champion. The riders finishing second and third are awarded silver and bronze medals respectively. The final classification also determines which riders qualify for the World Individual Speedway Championship.

The Danish Under 21 Individual Speedway Championship is a competition for riders holding a Danish passport, a valid DMU licence, and who are under 21 years of age on 1 January in the year of the competition. Riders wishing to compete must submit their entries at least four weeks before the first meeting of the competition. If there are 72 or more entries, four quarter-finals are staged. If there are between 54 and 71 entries, three quarter-finals are staged. If there are fewer than 54 entries, two semi-finals are held. Riders are selected for these rounds according to the previous season's averages in Danish matches only. When four quarter-finals are staged, the top eight riders (plus one reserve) in each progress to the semi-finals. When three quarter-finals are staged, the top ten riders (plus two reserves) from one round, and the top eleven riders (plus one reserve) from each of the other rounds, progress to the semi-finals. The top eight riders (plus one reserve) from each semi-final meet in the Final. The winner of the Final is awarded a gold medal and declared Danish Junior Individual Champion. Riders finishing second and third are awarded silver and bronze medals respectively. The top five finishers qualify for the World Junior Speedway Championship.

The Youth Leagues are for riders between eight and eighteen years of age and 80cc bikes are used. The Micro Leagues are for riders between three and ten years of age and 50cc bikes are used. And the Old Boys League is for riders over 33 years of age.

==== National team ====
Denmark enter a team in the Speedway World Cup. They won the competition in 2006, 2008 and 2012. Previously they won the Speedway World Team Cup in 1978, 1981, 1983, 1984, 1985, 1986, 1987, 1988, 1991, 1995 and 1997. Denmark also won the Speedway World Pairs Championship in 1979, 1985, 1986, 1987, 1988, 1989, 1990 and 1991.

==== Danish Grand Prix ====
The Danish Speedway Grand Prix is held in the Parken Stadium in Copenhagen

=== Australia ===
Although there was a short lived inter-state competition in Australia during the 1970s, due to the large size of the country riders have traditionally raced mostly at their local tracks, though the top riders often race away from 'home' for championship or other high-profile meetings.

The Australian Individual Speedway Championship is the oldest continuously running national speedway championship in the world having been run since 1926 with the exception of 1942–1945 when racing was suspended during World War II, and 1955–1961 when the championship was not held. The first championship was held at the Newcastle Showground in Newcastle, New South Wales and was won by American rider Cec Brown. For a number of years, qualification for the Australian Final came from the various State Championships held around the country. The Australian Final was held in various Australian states, usually on a rotating basis. The top places in the Final would then progress to the next stage of the World Championship qualifying. At times the next stage varied from the short lived Australasian Final which included riders from New Zealand, the Overseas Final which saw Commonwealth riders race with the Americans, or the Commonwealth Final which was restricted to riders from Commonwealth nations. The Australian Solo Final was run in the traditional single meeting format from 1926 to 2002 (though in the early years of the championship there was often more than one title contested as championships were held over anywhere from 3–6 laps, often depending on the size of the track). Since 2003 the Australian Championship has been run over a series of rounds (usually 3–5 rounds).

Australia also runs annual national Championship meetings for Under-16s (since 1982) and Under-21s (since 1987). These meetings are run in the traditional single meeting format and like the senior championship was for a number of years, the Finals are held in various Australian states on a rotating basis.

==== National team ====
Australia enter a team in both the Speedway World Cup and the Under-21 World Cup. They won the World Cup in 2001 and 2002. Previously they won the Speedway World Team Cup in 1976 and 1999. The Under-21 team placed second in the 2012 Under-2 World Cup.

For the first time, the Under-21 World Cup Final will be held outside Europe in 2015 with the Final scheduled to be held at the Olympic Park Speedway in Mildura on 31 October.

==== Australia Grand Prix ====
The Speedway Grand Prix of Australia was held in the Docklands Stadium in Melbourne from 2015 to 2017. Previously the SGP of Australia was held in 2002 at Stadium Australia.

=== Other nations ===
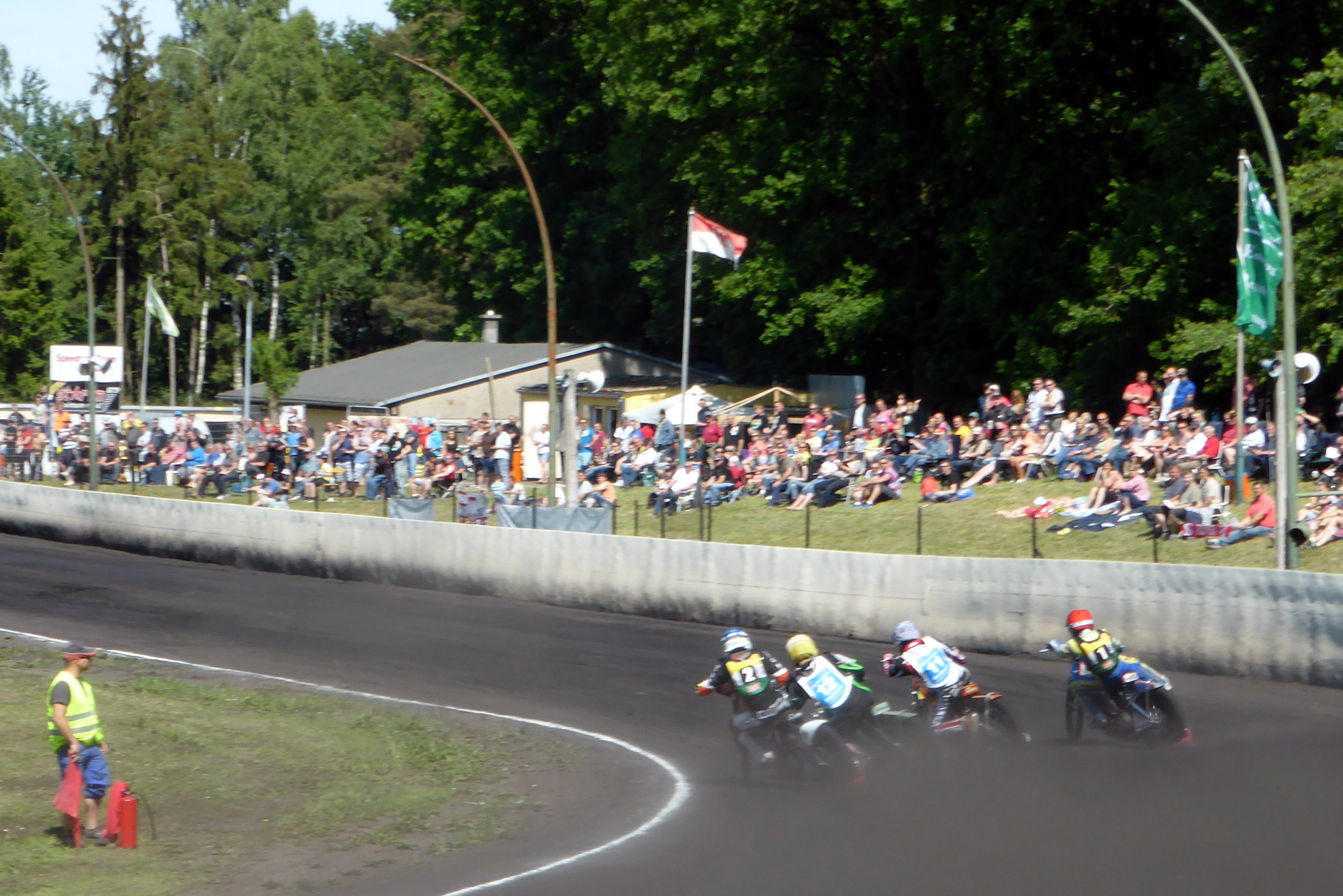
German Speedway-Bundesliga: Wolfslake Falubaz Berlin vs. Mordstern Stralsund

Introduced to Italy by occupying soldiers after World War II, speedway is most popular around the north-east of the country. The regions of Friuli-Venezia Giulia, Trentino-Alto Adige/Südtirol, Lombardy and Veneto host race meetings with the latter also hosting the Speedway Grand Prix of Italy in the town of Lonigo. The most successful speedway rider from Italy was Armando Castagna. Castagna was the only Italian professional speedway rider in the history of the sport, and qualified five times for an Individual World Final. Another former rider, Giuseppe Marzotto makes the GM speedway engines.

Speedway in Germany was overshadowed by its more popular track racing variant Sandbahn (Longtrack). However, the country occasionally hosts the Speedway Grand Prix of Germany and has produced one Speedway World Champion, Egon Müller in 1983. Another German rider is Martin Smolinski, who won the New Zealand Grand Prix in Auckland in March 2014. In 2018 German youngsters Norrick Blödorn and Ben Ernst won the world titles in 85 ccm and 250 ccm, showing the results of drastically improved support for young riders in the past decade.

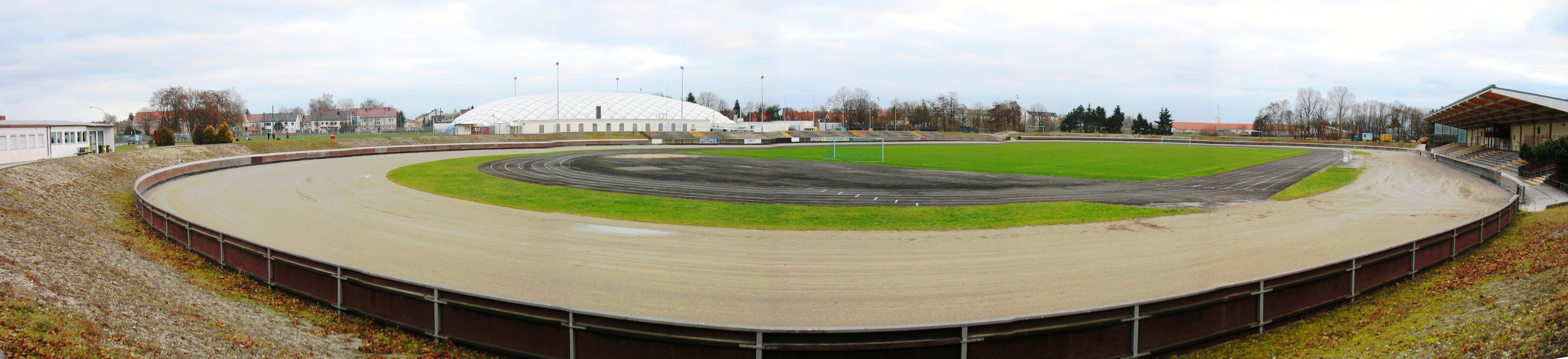
Stadion Haunstetten, a Sandbahn track

On a smaller scale, it also occurs in Argentina, Austria, Belgium, Bulgaria, Canada, Croatia, Czech Republic, Estonia, Finland, France, Hungary, Latvia, Netherlands, Norway, New Zealand, Romania, Russia, USA, Slovakia, Slovenia, Ukraine.

== See also ==
- Auto Race (Japanese sport)
- Dirt track racing
- Grasstrack
- Ice speedway
- Outline of motorcycles and motorcycling
- Track racing
- Cycle speedway
- Long track motorcycle racing
