= AMCA =

AMCA may refer to:

- A Man Called Adam (group)
- Advanced Medium Combat Aircraft, Indian aircraft project
- Air Movement and Control Association
- Amateur Motorcycling Association
- American Mosquito Control Association
- Antique Motorcycle Club of America
- Arkansas Medical Cannabis Act
