= List of 2018 United States cannabis reform proposals =

- 2017 ← → 2019
- Legality of cannabis in the United States (2023)
- Status: Legal for recreational use Legal for medical use Illegal

In 2018, U.S. states proposed or are expected to propose cannabis reform legislation for medical marijuana and non-medical adult use. State-level legalization remains at odds with cannabis' status as a Schedule I narcotic under the Controlled Substances Act at the Federal level, and the Cannabis policy of the Donald Trump administration appeared to become more hostile than that of the previous administration, with the early January rescission of the Cole Memorandum.

States expected to be most likely to propose legislation to fully legalize include Michigan, New Hampshire, New Jersey, and Rhode Island. Other possible full legalization states include Connecticut, Delaware, and Ohio; medical marijuana proposals were under way or expected in Oklahoma, Kentucky, South Dakota, and Utah.

== Federal ==
In the House of Representatives, Democratic Representatives Barbara Lee of California and Representative Ro Khanna, of the same state, introduced the Marijuana Justice Act, the counterpart of a Senate Bill 1689 which was introduced in 2017 by Senator Cory Booker.

A bipartisan bill, the Sensible Enforcement Of Cannabis Act, was introduced in February.

In late March, Senate Majority Leader Mitch McConnell announced he would introduce the Hemp Farming Act of 2018. It would expand the experimental hemp production allowed under the 2014 farm bill, removing hemp from Schedule I controlled substances and making it an ordinary agricultural commodity. He introduced the bill on the Senate floor on April 12.

On April 11, President Donald Trump told Senator Cory Gardner of Colorado that he would "support congressional efforts to protect states that have legalized marijuana". A bill to resolve the state-Federal conflict was still "a work in progress" but seemed to a Colorado cannabis industry group be implicit in Gardner's comments afterwards. California Senator Dianne Feinstein made a surprising reversal of her prior stance against state or federal legalization in May and said she was "open to supporting" the Gardner bill. Gardner and Senator Elizabeth Warren introduced the STATES Act in June to apply Federal prohibition only in states that did not have state-level legalization.

== State ==
In summary, Vermont passed legislation legalizing cannabis statewide in January, the first time legalization occurred via legislature, not initiative. Utah legalized medical cannabis without THC restrictions for some patients in March. Industrial hemp laws were passed in Alaska, Kansas and Oklahoma in April, and a New Mexico Supreme Court decision ordered the promulgation of a 2017 hemp bill. Oklahoma legalized medical cannabis in June.

State	Detail
Alaska	Senate Bill 6, allowing industrial hemp farming, was passed unanimously by both chambers of the state legislature, with passage in the House occurring on February 19, 2018. It was signed into law by the governor on April 13.
Arizona	An initiative to legalize hemp, defined as cannabis with less than 0.4% THC, was listed by the Secretary of State as a potential November, 2018 ballot measure.
Colorado	House Bill 1295 passed both houses of the state legislature, unanimously in the Senate, by April. It would "regulate hemp like any other food ingredient". A provision of the bill prohibits pharmaceutical companies from "interfering" with distribution or sale of naturally occurring (CBD-containing) hemp products.
Connecticut	In April, HB 5394, a bill to "require multiple state agencies to coordinate and develop a plan to legalize and regulate cannabis sales by October 1" was referred from the Appropriations Committee to the state General Assembly. This was the first time a legalization bill made it out of committee in the Connecticut legislature.
Georgia	State senator Curt Thompson introduced SB 344, legislation to legalize cannabis, in January. Atlanta had decriminalized the substance in 2017.
Illinois	Voters in Cook County answered 68% "yes" on a March referendum on statewide cannabis legalization. Earlier in March, the state senate had voted 73–13 to approve a bill sponsored by Bill Cunningham, presenting a statewide referendum on legalization in November. Proposed legalized, regulated sales: Further information: Cannabis in Illinois § Proposed recreational use (2017) SB316 and HB2353, which would create a regulated legalized adult-use system in Illinois, were introduced in 2017 and were still under consideration by the legislature in 2018. Hemp: A hemp bill, SB 2298, passed the state Senate unanimously on April 24. It would remove industrial hemp from the state's legal definition of a drug, and put it under regulation by the state Department of Agriculture. The bill passed the state House of Representatives 106–3 on May 25.
Iowa	The Iowa state Senate passed File 2398, the "Iowa Industrial Hemp Act", 49–0 on April 4.
Kansas	In March, Kansas Senate Bill 263, legalizing a hemp research and production pilot under the state's Department of Agriculture in accordance with the Federal 2014 Farm Bill, cleared the state House of Representatives 123 to 1 and the state Senate 36 to 3. The bill was signed into law by the governor on April 20.
Massachusetts	Although the legalization of cannabis in Massachusetts for recreational use was passed in a 2016 ballot, the purchase of recreation cannabis is still not legal in the state. The Massachusetts state legislature, who opposed the ballot question, have delayed the opening of any recreational dispensaries through additional regulatory means.
Michigan	As of January, 2018 a group had submitted over 300,000 signatures for the 2018 Michigan Marijuana Legalization Initiative pending certification by the state for the 2018 general election ballot. The state certified the initiative on April 26. Proposal 1 was approved by voters on November 6, and the Secretary of State certified the election returns as of November 26, and as such, the proposal must become law in Michigan by no later than December 6.
Missouri	SB 547 and HB 2034 were introduced to legalize hemp farming. The senate bill passed on March 15. Several versions of "Missouri Cannabis and Cannabis Hemp Legalization Initiative" were proposed to amend the Missouri state constitution. Initiative 2018-134 would allow prescription of cannabis by veterinarians. On May 1, the state House passed a bill to allow medical cannabis for conditions including cancer and PTSD. On May 3, New Approach Missouri and Find the Cure submitted two initiatives to the state for the November ballot. Each would amend the state constitution to allow medical cannabis. Both groups claimed to have conducted independent verification of over 300,000 signatures against the required 160,000.
New Hampshire	The New Hampshire state House of Representatives voted to legalize recreational marijuana on January 9. The bill, legalizing possession but not sale, was sent to the Ways and Means committee to hold hearings and study implementation.
New Jersey	On the legislature's opening day, January 9, Senate Bill 830 was introduced by Sen. Nicholas Scutari. It which would create a legal framework for cannabis sales in the state under a Division of Marijuana Enforcement, and allow personal possession of up to one ounce. Assembly Bill 1348, an identical bill, went to the house. In February, a bill decriminalizing possession of 10 grams of cannabis was introduced by a bipartisan group of legislators. In March, governor Phil Murphy said he wanted a tax-and-regulate bill passed by the legislature by year's end, and projecting such a measure would pass, included $60 million from cannabis tax revenues in the next year's state budget proposal.
New Mexico	In April, the Albuquerque City Council voted to decriminalize possession of one ounce of cannabis. In April, the state Supreme Court ruled unconstitutional an earlier governor's veto of two hemp bills that had passed the legislature. It was reported that SB6, which passed 58-8 and 37–2 in the House and Senate respectively, would probably become the basis for state law. The state Department of Agriculture commenced rulemaking for a hemp research program at the end of April as authorized by SB6.
North Carolina	Representative Kelly Alexander introduced House Bill 944 in May, which would raise the threshold for class one misdemeanor possession of cannabis (carrying jail time penalty) to four ounces, and allow expunging records of those previously convicted of that amount.
Oklahoma	House Bill 2913, a bill legalizing hemp production under the "Oklahoma Industrial Hemp Agricultural Pilot Program", passed the state senate unanimously and with one "nay" vote in the state house on April 17. It was signed into law by the governor on April 25. State Question 788, a statutory initiative creating a legal medical cannabis program, was passed by voters during the June 26, 2018 primary. In April, two other initiatives, SQ 796 and SQ 797, qualified for signature gathering in advance of the general election. The latter would legalize adult-use (recreational) cannabis in Oklahoma. Both are proposed constitutional amendments and could not be changed by the state legislature.
Tennessee	On March 21, the Tennessee House of Representatives' Criminal Justice Committee voted 9–2 to approve the Medical Cannabis Only Act of 2018. The state senate killed the bill before the legislature adjourned. An issue of concern was there was no taxation or regulatory system in place under the house proposal. In June two Republican state senators introduced Tennessee Responsible Use of Medicinal Plants (TRUMP) Act to legalize medical cannabis in Tennessee.
Utah	Further information: Utah Medical Cannabis Act initiative A group called Utah Patients Coalition filed the Utah Medical Cannabis Act initiative in June, 2018. By the beginning of the year, the group had gathered more than half of the 113,000 signatures required to get an initiative for medical cannabis on the November ballot. The initiative allows for topicals, cannabis oil, cannabis edibles and vaping, but not smoking. Polls in the second half of 2017 showed up to 78% support for the initiative. In February, the state house passed HB 197 as an alternative to the initiative. Under HB 197, the Utah Department of Agriculture and Food would grow and supply cannabis to patients. A matching bill, HB 195, is a right-to-try law for terminally ill patients. On March 7, the bills were passed "easily" by the state senate, and on the 15th and 16th the bills were sent to the governor to be signed into law. On March 21, the governor signed HB 195 but not 197. On March 26, the Lieutenant Governor's office validated 117,000 signatures on the Utah Medical Cannabis Act initiative, enough for it to get on the November ballot.
Vermont	Main article: Cannabis in Vermont Vermont legalized cannabis possession by an act of the state legislature, and signed by the governor, on January 22, 2018.

== Territory ==
The CNMI Cannabis Act of 2018 was introduced to the Northern Mariana Islands Commonwealth Legislature in 2017, and was passed by the Senate in May, 2018.
