= Cannabis policy of the first Trump administration =

The first Donald Trump administration (2017–2021) took positions against marijuana and against the easing of laws regarding marijuana. Although Trump indicated during his 2016 presidential campaign that he favored leaving the issue of legalization of marijuana to the states, his administration subsequently upheld the federal prohibition of cannabis, and Trump's 2021 fiscal budget proposal included removing protections for state medical marijuana laws.

In 2018, the administration rescinded the 2013 Cole Memorandum, an Obama-era Justice Department policy that generally directed federal prosecutors not to pursue marijuana prosecutions in states where marijuana is legal as a matter of state law. However, Trump signed the 2018 farm bill, which descheduled some cannabis products from the Controlled Substances Act for the first time.

== Early statements ==
At a press conference in February 2017, White House Press Secretary Sean Spicer indicated that the federal government could pursue greater enforcement of federal anti-marijuana laws, with the U.S. Department of Justice under Trump "further looking into" states where recreational marijuana was legal as a matter of state law. Spicer distinguished between recreational marijuana use and medical marijuana use, suggesting that Trump "understands the pain and suffering that many people go through who are facing, especially terminal diseases, and the comfort that some of these drugs, including medical marijuana, can bring to them". Spicer stated that the administration believed there was a link between recreational marijuana use and opiate abuse, despite current studies that show the reverse and that marijuana use actually results in a lower incidence of opiate abuse.

== Rescission of the Cole Memorandum and Obama-era non-interference policy ==
On January 4, 2018, Attorney General Jeff Sessions rescinded three Obama-era memos that had adopted a policy of non-interference with states that have legalized recreational marijuana, including the 2013 Cole Memorandum.

In April 2018, after U.S. Senator Cory Gardner (Republican of Colorado), threatened to block the appointment of 20 Justice Department nominees in response to the Cole Memorandum's rescission, Gardner said that he had made a deal with Trump in which the administration said it would uphold the rights of states to regulate cannabis within their associated jurisdictions and assured states with legalized cannabis that the rescission of the Cole Memo would not subject them to federal prosecutors.

== Legislation ==
One of the first official statements on the Trump administration's policies came in May 2017, when, while signing the 2017 omnibus appropriations bill, Trump included a signing statement saying that his administration could ignore the Rohrabacher–Blumenauer amendment (formerly the Rohrabacher–Farr amendment), which prohibits the use of federal funds to prosecute persons for medical marijuana activities that are legal under applicable state law. Trump's signing statement suggested that the congressional limitation on spending authority did not legally bind him.

In June 2018, Trump stated that he would "probably" support the STATES Act, a bipartisan bill that would effectively end the federal prohibition on marijuana and leave the issue up to the states.

== Response of the states ==
As of 2019, thirty-seven states have legalized marijuana for medical use. Alaska, California, Colorado, Illinois, Maine, Massachusetts, Nevada, Oregon, Vermont, Michigan, and Washington and the District of Columbia have legalized it for recreational use as well. In April 2017, the governors of Alaska, Colorado, Oregon and Washington sent a letter to the U.S. administration urging continuation of Federal policy under the Cole Memorandum.

In response to the February 2017 announced crackdown:

- Washington State Attorney General Bob Ferguson stated Washington will defend its marijuana laws: "I will resist any efforts by the Trump administration to undermine the will of the voters in Washington state," Ferguson said in an interview. On February 15, Ferguson and Governor Jay Inslee sent a letter to U.S. Attorney General Jeff Sessions stating that illegal dealing in the State of Washington has been replaced with a tax-paying regulated industry, and the move has freed up law enforcement officers for other duties. Ferguson and Inslee's letter told Sessions that "Given the limited resources available for marijuana law enforcement, a return to 'full' prohibition' is highly unlikely to end the illicit production, trafficking and consumption of marijuana."
- Nevada Senate Majority Leader Aaron D. Ford called on the state's attorney general to "vigorously defend" the state's laws legalizing and taxing recreational marijuana. Ford said that "Any action by the Trump administration would be an insult to Nevada voters and would pick the pockets of Nevada's students."
- U.S. Senator Ron Wyden of Oregon responded to the intended crackdown, by calling on the federal government to respect the decision of Oregon voters to legalize marijuana and saying that "the Trump administration is threatening states' rights, including the rights of one in five Americans who live in a state where marijuana is legal." He stated he would ask the state to oppose federal government intrusion into the state.

== See also ==
- Cannabis policy of the second Trump administration
- Domestic policy of the second Trump administration
