= 2018 Michigan Proposal 1 =

Proposal 1
- Michigan Regulation and Taxation of Marijuana Act

Results
Choice	Votes	%
Yes	2,356,422	55.89%
No	1,859,675	44.11%
Total votes	4,216,097	100.00%
Yes
60–70%
50–60%
No
60–70%
50–60%

The Michigan Regulation and Taxation of Marijuana Act, also known as Proposal 1, was an initiative that appeared on the November 2018 ballot to legalize cannabis in the U.S. state of Michigan. The initiative allows adults 21 and older to possess up to 2.5 ounces (71 g) of cannabis and to grow up to 12 plants at home. The initiative was approved with 56% of the vote.

== History ==
In November 2017, supporters submitted 365,000 signatures to get legal recreational cannabis on the 2018 ballot. The state certified the initiative on April 26.

The Detroit Free Press reported that state Republicans planned to amend and attempt to pass the initiative in the state legislature. The amendment would involve an income tax cut offset by cannabis tax revenue, and regulation by the appointed board in charge of medical cannabis, not by the Department of Licensing and Regulatory Affairs (LARA). If passed by the legislature, it would not appear on the general ballot.

By June 5, the deadline for an "adopt-and-amend" act to go through the legislature expired, and the un-amended initiative would appear on ballots in November.

== Bill contents ==
The Michigan Regulation and Taxation of Marihuana Act, also sometimes referred to as the "RMLA", would legalize the possession of marijuana for those 21 years and older. The Act also contains a number of provisions that would change the state's marijuana and hemp laws, including:

- The Act would eliminate the penalties for anyone who possesses, uses, purchases, transports, or processes 2.5 ounces or less of marijuana, or up to 15 grams (½ oz) of marijuana concentrate.
- The Act further expands this limit to possession of no more than 10 ounces of marijuana within a residence.
- The Act allows a Michigan resident to cultivate up to 12 plants in their personal residence.
- The Act allows municipalities the option to completely prohibit or limit the number of marijuana establishments within its boundaries.
- The Act creates an additional commercial marijuana license category called a "microbusiness", which allows an individual to grow up to 150 plants and sell direct to the consumer.
- The Act gives LARA the authority to approve or disapprove licenses, as opposed to the medical facility law, which gives that power to a politically appointed licensing board.
- The Act imposes a 10% excise tax on the sale of recreational marijuana.

== Support ==
The Coalition to Regulate Marijuana Like Alcohol is the main supporter of the initiative.

== Opposition ==
In February 2018, it was reported that Smart Approaches to Marijuana was funding opposition to the initiative, as they had in other states including California. Two other local groups, Healthy and Productive Michigan and the Committee to Keep Pot Out of Neighborhoods and Schools, were formed in 2017 to oppose the initiative.

== Public opinion ==
Public opinion on the legalization of recreational marijuana in Michigan
Poll source	Date(s) administered	Sample size	Margin of error	% support	% opposition	% Undecided/Don't Know
EPIC-MRA	September 21–25, 2018	600 AV	± 4.0%	56%	41%	3%
EPIC-MRA	February 24 – 27, 2018	600 AV	± 4.0%	61%	35%	4%
Glengariff Group/Detroit News/WDIV	January 16–19, 2018	600 LV	± 4.0%	57%	37%	6%
Marketing Resource Group	May 8–11, 2017	600 LV	± 4.0%	58%	36%	6%
EPIC-MRA	January 30 – February 2, 2017	600 LV	± 4.0%	57%	40%	3%

== See also ==
- Cannabis in Michigan
- List of 2018 United States cannabis reform proposals
- List of Michigan ballot measures
