= List of 2017 United States cannabis reform proposals =

- 2016 ← → 2018
- Legality of cannabis in the United States (2023)
- Status: Legal for recreational use Legal for medical use Illegal

In 2017, U.S. states proposed or are expected to propose cannabis reform legislation for medical marijuana and non-medical adult use. State-level legalization remains at odds with cannabis' status as a Schedule I narcotic under the Controlled Substances Act at the Federal level, and the Cannabis policy of the Donald Trump administration remains unclear as of early 2017.

States that were expected to propose legislation included Delaware, Rhode Island, New Jersey, Texas, Virginia, Kentucky, New Mexico, Vermont, and Missouri.

State	Detail
Delaware	A legalization bill was introduced by state senator Margaret Rose Henry in March, 2017.
Kentucky	The Cannabis Compassion Act (BR 409) for medical cannabis was filed in December, 2016.
Michigan	On May 17, the Michigan Secretary of State approved for signature collection a voter initiative which will, if it becomes law, allow adult possession of 2.5 ounces of cannabis, and create a state regulatory system for production and sale in Michigan. The initiative's sponsor, Coalition to Regulate Marijuana Like Alcohol, is the state level activity of the national Marijuana Policy Project.
Missouri	A legalization initiative was certified to begin gathering signatures by Missouri's Secretary of State in January. The previous year, an initiative failed the threshold to appear on the ballot by 23 signatures.
New Hampshire	HB 640, a bill to decriminalize possession of a fraction of an ounce of cannabis was passed by voice vote on June 1 and sent to the governor for his signature to become law. The governor, Chris Sununu, has expressed his intention to sign the bill.
New Jersey	In February, state senator Nicholas Scutari said he would introduce legislation to legalize cannabis in the state.
Rhode Island	Rhode Island state senator Joshua Miller and representative Scott Slater said they planned to introduce a legalization bill for the seventh straight year in 2017.
Tennessee	In August, the state's Lieutenant Governor Randy McNally and House Speaker Beth Harwell announced in a letter that they intended to form an ad-hoc committee to consider legalization of medical marijuana.
Texas	On April 3, 2017, a bill decriminalizing possession of under an ounce of cannabis cleared a committee for consideration by the state house. Other legislation included SB 269, introduced by state senator Jose Menendez, which would go beyond then-current legal status of CBD oil, and completely legalize medical cannabis. State senator José R. Rodríguez introduced a similar bill, Senate Joint Resolution 18, and SJR 17 to put non-medical legalization to a statewide ballot in November.
Vermont	An updated version of a failed 2016 Senate bill was passed on April 21. On May 3, the state House passed its own version of legalization. The two bills needed to be reconciled. On May 10, the joint bill legalizing cannabis was approved by the state legislature, for the first time in U.S. history. On May 24, Governor Phil Scott vetoed the bill.
