= Motocross =

Off-road motorcycle racing held on enclosed off-road circuits

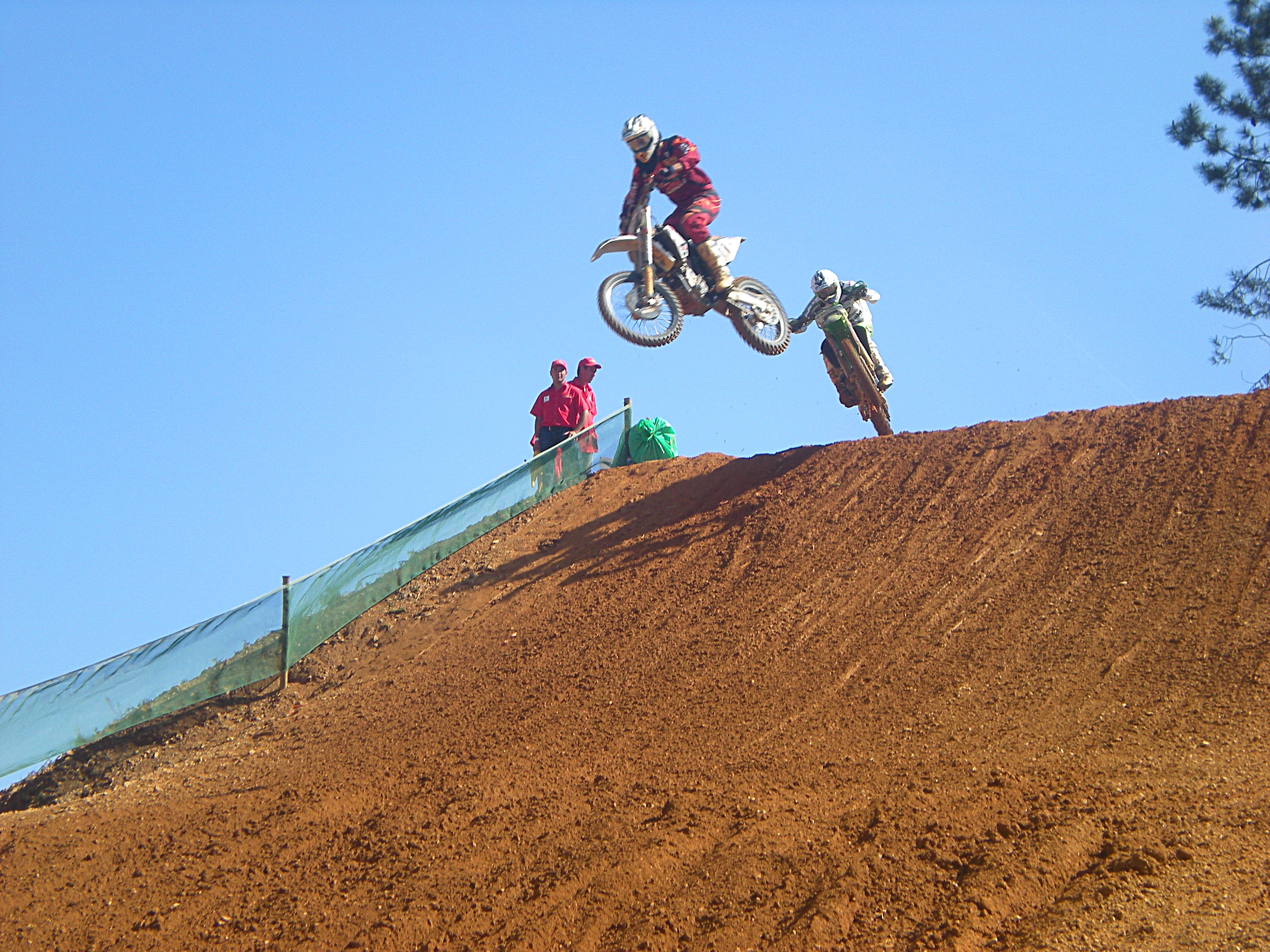
A motocross rider coming off a jump

Motocross championship

Motocross (abbr. MX) is a form of off-road motorcycle racing held on a closed, off-road course over rough terrain. Courses may cover man-made and natural obstacles such as sand, steep inclines, banked or off camber turns and may involve rain or mud as the weather dictates. Originating in the United Kingdom, it grew out of the slow paced motorcycle trials competitions evolving into fast paced racing. Though known as "scrambles racing" (or just "scrambles") in the United Kingdom, the sport grew in popularity and the competitions became known internationally as "motocross", a portmanteau of motocyclette (french for motorcycle) and cross country.

== History ==
Motocross evolved in Britain from motorcycle trials competitions, such as the Auto-Cycle Clubs's first quarterly trial in 1909 and the Scottish Six Days Trial that began in 1912. When organisers dispensed with delicate balancing and strict scoring of trials in favour of a race to become the fastest rider to the finish, the activity became known as "hare scrambles", said to have originated in the phrase, "a rare old scramble" describing one such early race.

=== Beginings ===
The first known scramble race in the world took place in Camberley, Surrey in 1924. The 100th anniversary of the very first Motocross race was commemorated in March 2024. The same cub that ran the 1924 event ran it again over the same land. During the 1930s the sport grew in popularity, especially in Britain where teams from the BSA, Norton, Matchless, Rudge, and AJS competed in the events. The first motocross race held on an artificial track inside a stadium took place on August 28, 1948, at Buffalo Stadium in the Paris suburb of Montrouge. The event was the forerunner to supercross competitions.

Off-road motorcycles from that era differed little from those used on the street. The intense competition over rugged terrain led to technical improvements in motorcycles. Rigid frames gave way to suspensions by the early 1930s, and swinging arm rear suspension appeared by the early 1950s, several years before manufacturers incorporated it in the majority of production street bikes. The period after World War II was dominated by BSA, which had become the largest motorcycle company in the world. BSA riders dominated international competitions throughout the 1940s.

=== Post War Era ===
In 1947 the first ever team racing event took place. The Motocross des Nations was held for the first time in the Netherlands. The "des Nations" was conducted on 500 cc four-strokes with team Great Britain taking the trophy.

In 1952 the FIM, motorcycling's international governing body, set up an individual European Championship using a 500 cc engine displacement formula. In 1957 it was upgraded to World Championship status.

In 1961 the Trophée des Nations, a 250cc version of the "des nations" was introduced.

In 1962 a 250 cc world championship was established and new rules were adopted dividing the races into two 45-minute races that were referred to as motos.

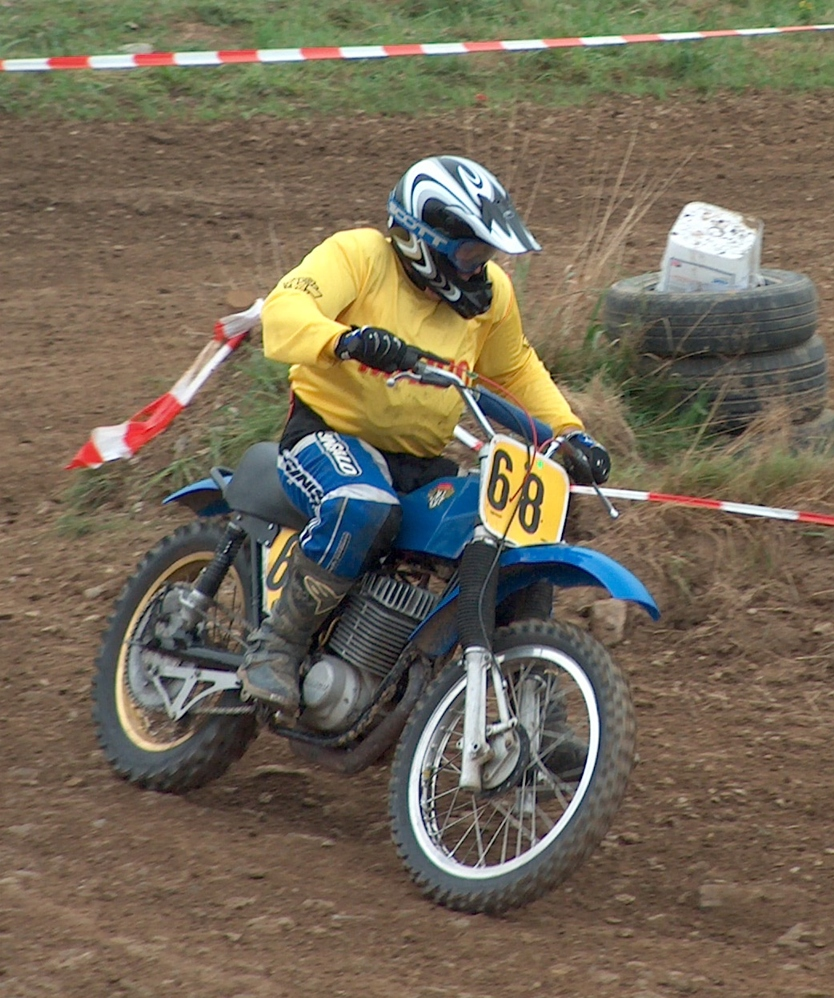
A Maico 360 cc with air-cooled engine and twin shock absorbers on the rear suspension

=== Two-Strokes Era ===
In the smaller 250 cc category companies with two-stroke motorcycles came into their own. Companies such as Husqvarna from Sweden, ČZ from the former Czechoslovakia, Bultaco from Spain and Greeves from England became popular due to their lightness and agility.

A significant moment in motocross history occurred during the 1963 FIM Motocross World Championship when ČZ factory rider Vlastimil Válek rode a 263cc two-stroke motorcycle to win the first moto of the 500cc Czechoslovak Motocross Grand Prix ahead of a field of top-class, four-stroke engine motorcycles. The victory marked a turning point in motocross history, as the first win by a two-stroke engine motorcycle in the premier division of the Motocross World Championships.

By the mid-1960s, advances in two-stroke engine technology meant that the heavier, four-stroke machines were relegated to niche competitions. Riders from Belgium and Sweden began to dominate the sport during this period. Motocross arrived in the United States in 1966 when Swedish champion, Torsten Hallman rode an exhibition event against the top American TT riders at the Corriganville Movie Ranch also known as Hopetown in Simi Valley, California. The following year Hallman was joined by other motocross stars including Roger DeCoster, Joël Robert, and Dave Bickers. They dominated the event, placing their lightweight two-strokes into the top six finishing positions. A motorcycle sales boom in the United States fueled by the Baby Boomer generation, helped to spark a growth in the popularity of motocross among young Americans.

Japanese motorcycle manufacturers began challenging the European factories for supremacy in the motocross world by the late 1960s. Suzuki claimed the first world championship for a Japanese factory when Joël Robert won the 1970 250 cc crown. In 1972, the American Motorcyclist Association (AMA) inaugurated the AMA Motocross Championships and held its first stadium race at the Los Angeles Coliseum, promoted by Mike Goodwin and Terry Tiernan, then-president of the AMA. The stadium event, won by 16-year-old Marty Tripes, paved the way for constructed, stadium-based motocross events known as supercross. The AMA oversees 45 different geographic districts across the United States and Puerto Rico.

In 1975, the FIM introduced a 125 cc world championship. European riders continued to dominate international motocross competitions throughout the 1970s with Belgian or Swedish riders winning ten Motocross des Nations (MXDN) events between 1969 and 1980 but, by the 1980s, American riders had caught up with American teams winning a string of 13 consecutive MXDN victories between 1981 and 1993. In 1978, Akira Watanabe became the first non-European competitor to win a motocross world championship and in 1982, Brad Lackey became the first individual American motocross world champion.

From the late 1970s to early 1990s, Japanese motorcycle manufacturers presided over a boom period in motocross technology. The typical air-cooled two-strokes with twin-shock rear suspension and telescopic front forks gave way to water-cooled engines and single-shock absorber rear suspension and "upside-down" (or inverted) front forks. Although the advancement of two-stroke engine technology was the primary focus of the major Japanese motorcycle manufacturers well into the mid 1990s, a rekindled interest in engineering a competitive, lightweight four-stroke motocross race bike was expressed among several brands, including Yamaha Motor Corporation and Husqvarna.

=== Modern Four-stroke Era ===
Facing tightening federal emissions regulations in the United States, the AMA increased the allowable displacement capacity for four-stroke engines in 1997, in an effort to encourage manufacturers to develop environmentally friendlier four-stroke machines. Due to the low relative power output of a four-stroke engine compared to the then-dominating two-stroke design, the displacement limit of a four-stroke power motocross bike was raised to 250cc in the 125 class and 550cc in the 250 class.

The new regulations resulted in competitors aboard four-strokes made by smaller European manufacturers, with Husqvarna, Husaberg, and KTM winning world championships on four-stroke machinery. In 1997, Yamaha unveiled a prototype 400cc four-stroke motorcycle, the YZM 400, which was debuted in the FIM Motocross World Championship. The motorcycle made its U.S. debut in 1997, where Yamaha Factory Racing rider Doug Henry led every lap of the main event at the 1997 AMA Supercross Finale and became the first person to win an AMA Supercross race on a four-stroke powered motorcycle. Following Yamaha's release of the production model YZ400F in 1998, Henry won the 250 AMA Motocross Championship and became the first person to win a major AMA Motocross title on a four-stroke powered motorcycle. This success motivated the remaining major manufacturers, Honda, Kawasaki, and Suzuki, to develop their own four-stroke motocross race bikes. By 2006, every manufacturer had begun competing with four-stroke machines in the AMA 125 (FIM MX2) and 250 (MX1) classes.

The sport has further evolved into a sub-discipline similar to supercross known as arenacross, which is held in small indoor arenas. Classes were also formed for all-terrain vehicles. Freestyle motocross (FMX) events where riders are judged on their jumping and aerial acrobatic skills have gained popularity, as has supermoto, where motocross machines race both on tarmac and off-road. Vintage motocross (VMX) events take place – usually for motorcycles predating the 1975 model year. Many VMX races also include a "Post Vintage" portion, which usually includes bikes dating until 1983.

== Major competitions ==
=== FIM Motocross World Championship ===
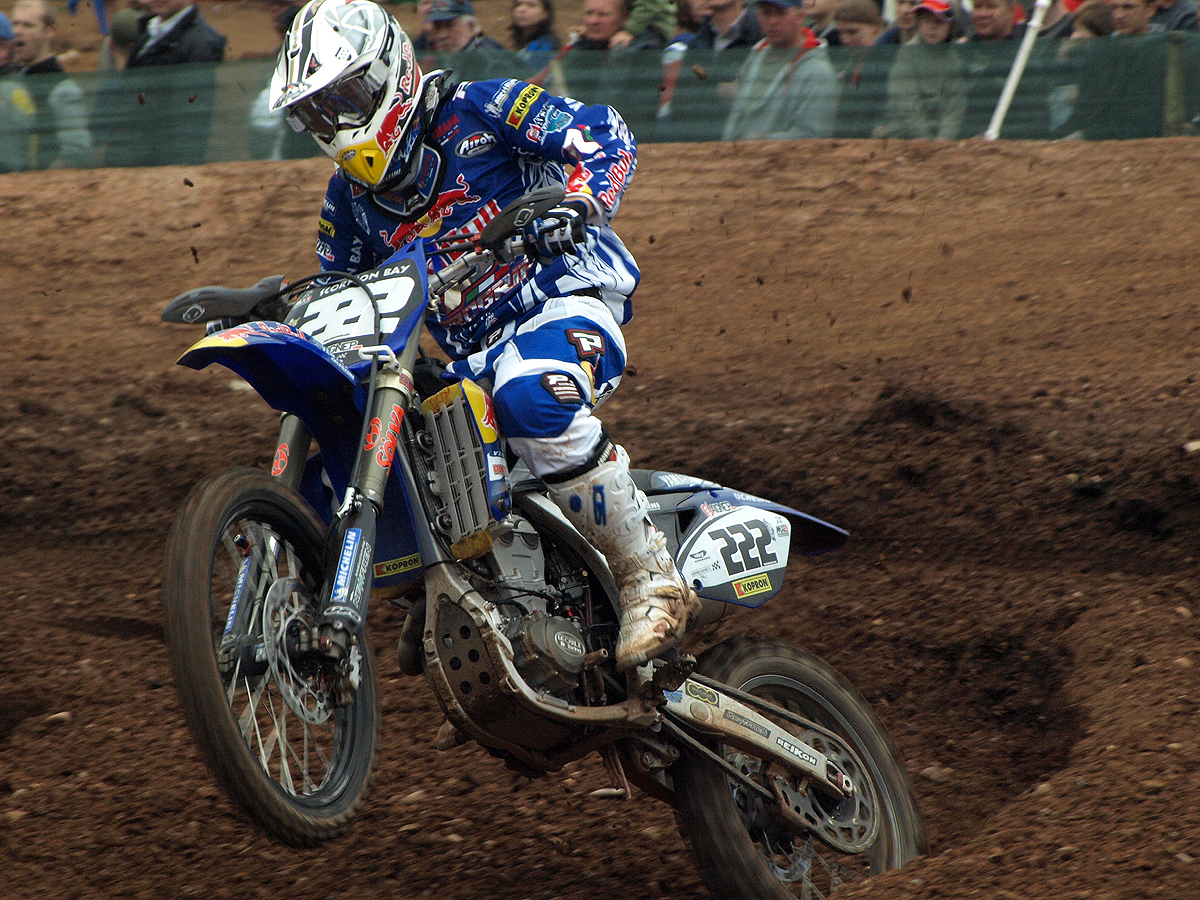
FIM Motocross World Championship

The FIM Grand Prix Motocross World Championship is predominantly held in Europe, but also includes events in North America, South America, Asia, Australia, and Africa. It is the major Motocross series worldwide. There are three classes: MXGP for 450cc machines, MX2 for 250cc machines, and Women's MX. Competitions consist of two races which are called motos with a duration of 30 minutes plus two laps.

=== AMA Motocross Championship ===
The AMA Motocross Championship begins in mid May and continues until late August. The championship consists of eleven rounds at eleven major tracks all over the continental United States. There are three classes: the 250cc Motocross Class for 150–250 cc 4-stroke machines, the 450cc Motocross Class for 251–450 cc 4-stroke machines and a 250cc Women's Class, using the same rules as men's 250cc. Race events take place over two motos of 30 minutes plus two laps each.

=== Motocross des Nations ===
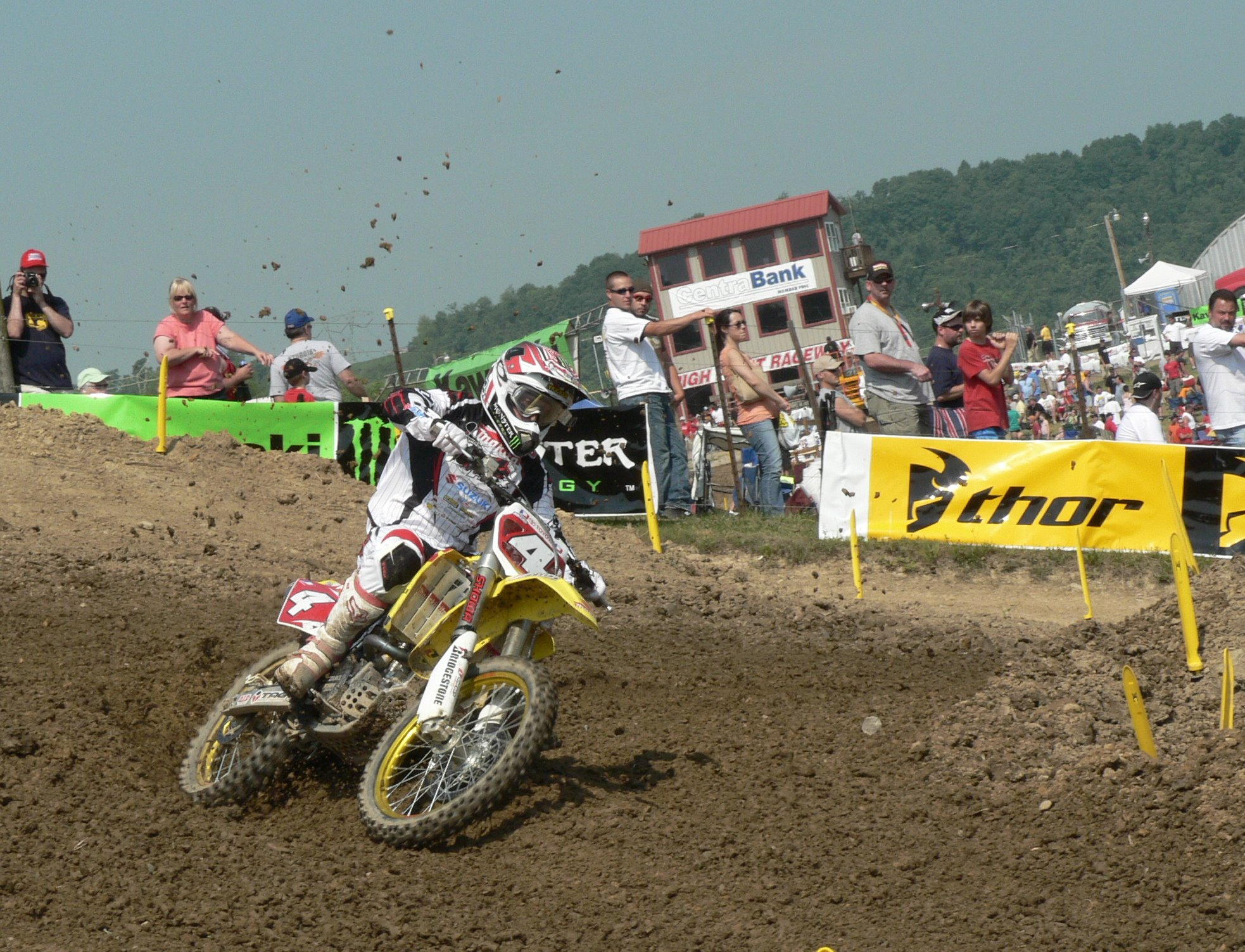
Ricky Carmichael at 2007 Motocross des Nations

The annual Motocross des Nations is held at the end of the year when National and World Championship series have ended. The competition involves teams of three riders representing their nations. Each rider competes in a different class (MX1, MX2, and "Open"). There are three motos with two classes competing per moto. The location of the event changes from year to year. The United States, Belgium and Great Britain have had the greatest success.

=== British Motocross Championship ===
Th British Motocross Championship is the main UK off-road competition and organised into classes of MX1 and MX2. MX1 is for 250 cc to 450 cc (four-stroke) and MX2 for 175 cc to 250 cc four-stroke motorcycles. In 2007 an additional youth class, the MXY2 class, was added to the programme at selected rounds.

A "Veterans" series was introduced in 2009 with just two rounds but the demand for places was so high that from 2011 the Veterans series will have three rounds, held over six races.

== Sports derived from motocross ==
A number of other types of motorcycle sport have been derived from Motocross.

=== Supercross ===
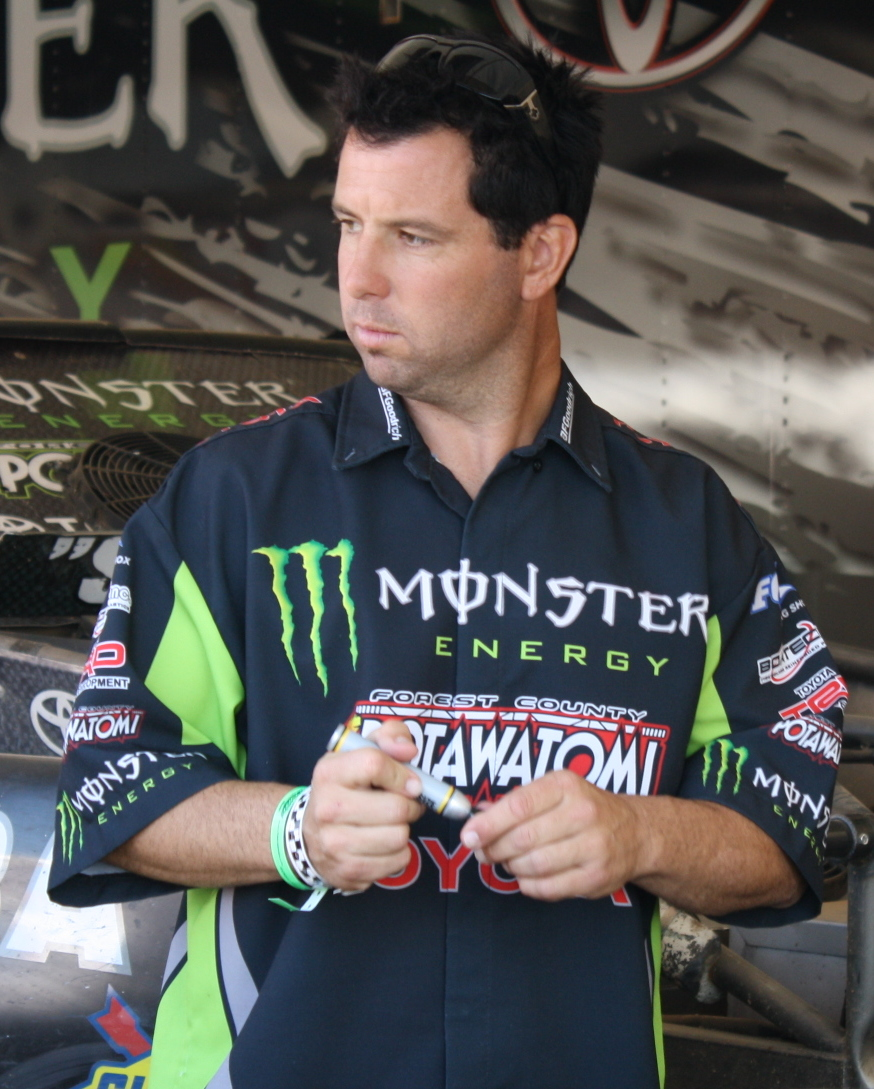
Jeremy McGrath won 7 Premier Class AMA Supercross titles, earning him the nickname the "King of Supercross".

Supercross is a cycle racing sport involving specialized high-performance off-road motorcycles on constructed dirt tracks with steep jumps and obstacles. Supercross events are typically staged on specially prepared tracks in large halls or stadiums. Compared to regular motocross, supercross tracks generally have much shorter straights and tighter turns. Professional supercross races, held as the AMA Supercross Championship in the United States, are held almost exclusively in professional baseball and football stadiums.

The supercross season takes place during the winter and spring months, with races in a different city every weekend. There are 17 races in the AMA Supercross Championship schedule, normally beginning in Anaheim, California, and ending in Las Vegas, Nevada. The 250 cc class is split into two series, east and west. The 450 cc class has one large series with events across the US and Canada.

In 2022, the World Supercross Championship was demerged from the AMA Supercross Championship, to be held as a standalone series once more. The series previously ran from 2003 to 2008. Supercross events are also held in Australia, known as the Australian Supercross Championship promoted by Motorcycling Australia. Along with the SX Open held in Auckland, New Zealand, the country's biggest event the Aus X-Open forms part of the Oceania Supercross Championship.

=== Freestyle ===
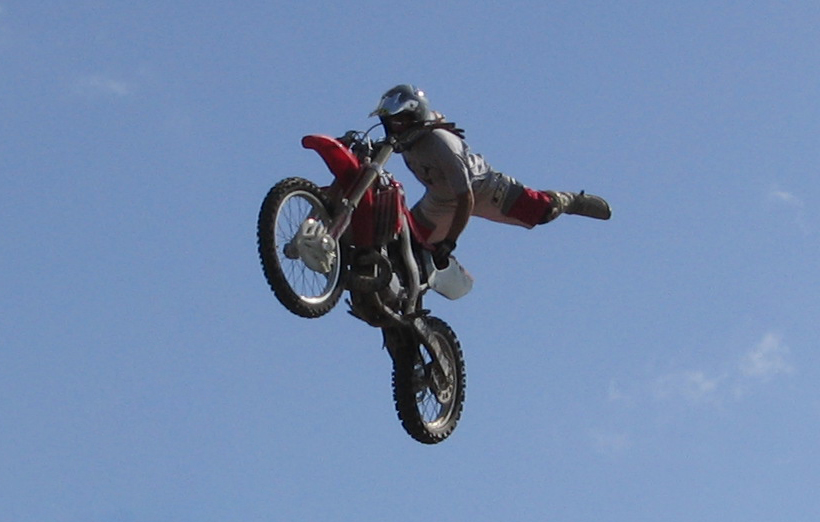
"Superman seat-grab"

Freestyle motocross (FMX), a relatively new variation of supercross started by the South African champion, Marco Urzi, does not involve racing and instead it concentrates on performing acrobatic stunts while jumping motocross bikes. The winner is chosen by a group of judges. The riders are scored on style, level of trick difficulty, best use of the course, and frequently, crowd reactions. FMX was introduced to the X Games and mainstream audiences in 1999.

=== Supermoto ===
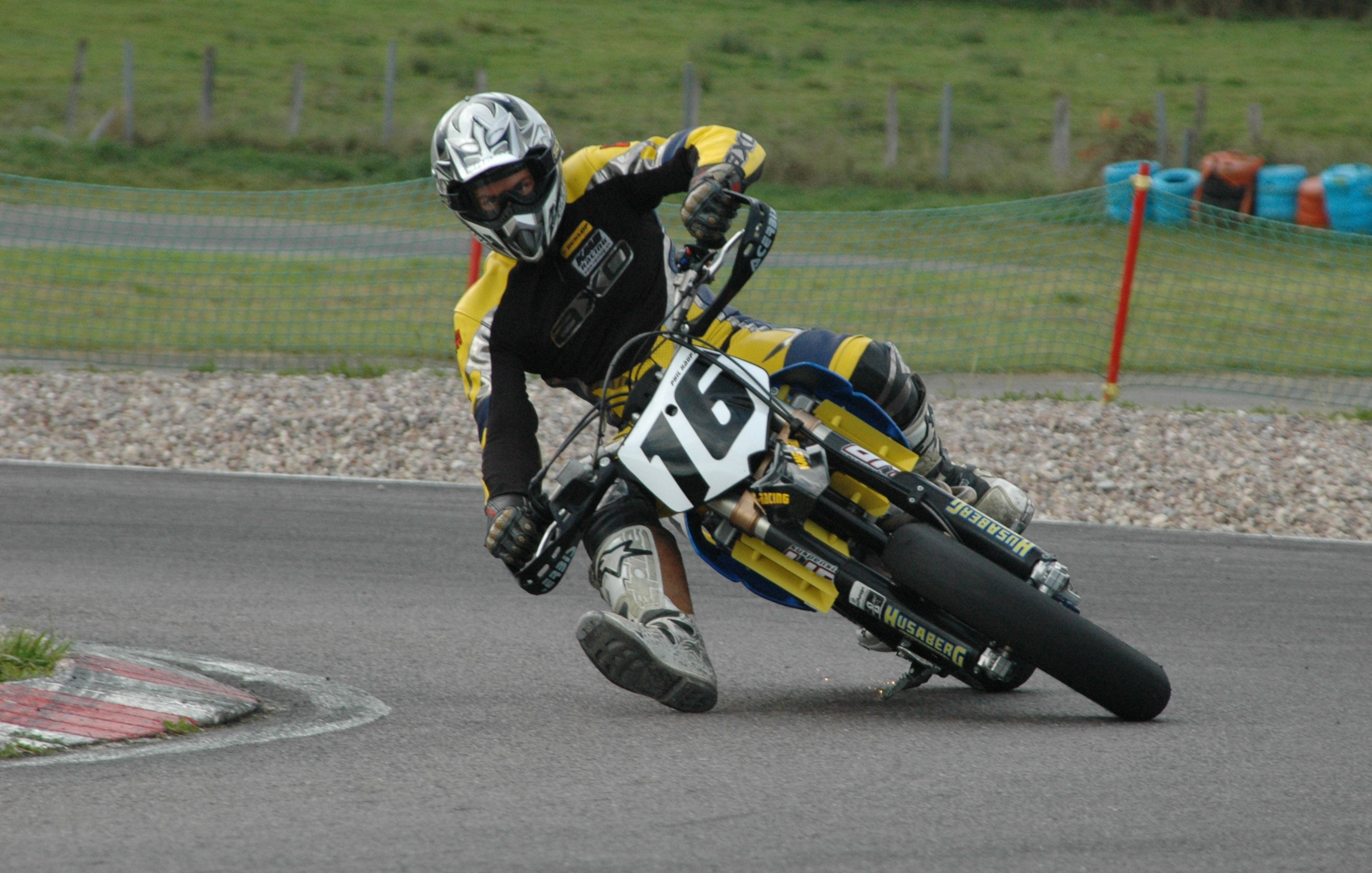
A Supermoto rider on the track

Supermoto uses motocross bikes converted for racing on tracks consisting of three sections: flat dirt, dirt obstacles, and paved road. The bikes have special road-racing tires with grooved tread to grip both the pavement and dirt. Some tracks for these race events have jumps, berms, and whoops like motocross tracks. For special events, the Supermoto track may incorporate metal ramps for jumps that can be disassembled and taken to other locations. Supermoto races may take place at modified go-kart tracks, road racing tracks, or even street racing tracks. There are also classes for children, such as the 85 cc class.

Supermoto began in the US the late 1970s when TV journalist Gavin Trippe envisioned a racing event that would prove who the best motorcycle racer was. From 1980 to 1985, he organized a yearly event called "The Superbikers", which pitted the top riders from three disciplines, flat track, road racing, and motocross against one another on modified bikes raced on special tracks on the television show. Its first exposure to a wide audience came on the American television program ABC's Wide World of Sports in 1979. After 1985, the sport declined and received little exposure in the US, but in Europe, it started gaining popularity, and in 2003 it was revived in the US, when the name became Supermoto.

=== ATV/quad motocross ===
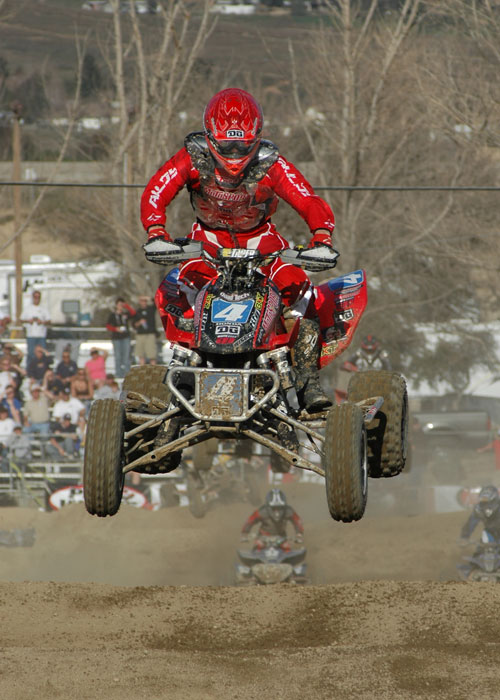
Professional ATV racer Tim Farr at the 2006 Glen Helen MX national

Throughout the United States and the United Kingdom there are many quad racing clubs with enduro and quadcross sections. GNCC Racing began around 1980 and includes hare scramble and enduro type races. To date, events are mainly held in the eastern part of the United States. GNCC racing features many types of obstacles such as, hill climbing, creek and log crossings, dirt roads and wooded trails.

The ATV National Motocross Championship was formed around 1985. ATVMX events are hosted at motocross racetracks throughout the United States. ATVMX consists of several groups, including the Pro (AMA Pro) and Amateur (ProAm) series.

=== Sidecarcross ===
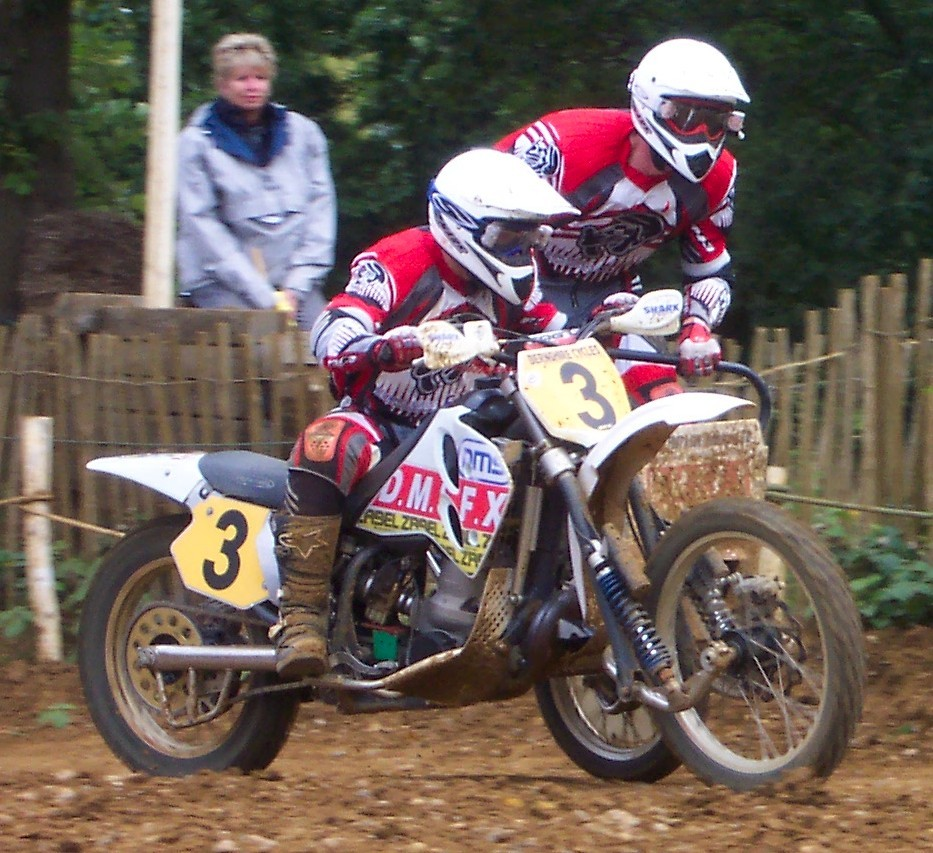
A Zabel-engined sidecar outfit

Sidecar racing, known as Sidecarcross has been around since the 1950s but has declined in popularity since the mid‑1980s. This variant is common in Europe, with a few followers in the United States, New Zealand, and Australia. The premier competition, the Sidecarcross World Championship, is contested on European tracks only and almost exclusively by Europeans.

Motocross sidecars are purpose built frames that resemble an ordinary motocross-cycle with a flat platform to stand on attached to either side and a handlebar at waist height to hold on to. The side of the "chair" (slang for the platform) usually follows the side of the road the nation in question drives upon, but not always. The passenger balances the bike by being a counterweight, especially in corners and on jumps. It is driven on ordinary crosstracks.

It is very physically demanding, especially for the passenger. This is reflected in most in the Swedish term for passenger, burkslav, roughly translated as trunk/barrel-slave. This name comes from the early sidecars which resembled road motorcycle sidecars and not today's platform.

The major frame builders today are VMC, BSU, AYR, EML and Woodenleg. Ordinary engines can be used, but size matters and two engines purpose-built for sidecars exist, Zabel (Germany) and MTH (Austria) are most common. Four-strokes are becoming more common, usually KTM (Austria).

=== Pit bikes and mini-motocross ===
Two riders go into a corner at a mini-motocross event in West Virginia.

Pit bikes are small motorbikes that participants in powersports events use to ride around the pits, which are the staging areas where team support vehicles are located. More recently, they have been used in races held on either supercross or motocross tracks. Numerous performance and aesthetic upgrades are often applied to pit bikes.

Originally, there was only one way to acquire a pit bike. A rider could either buy a used bike, or buy a new child's minibike, usually a Honda CRF110 or Kawasaki KLX110, and apply all the necessary upgrades and modifications to build a competitive pit bike. Since 2004, manufacturers like Thumpstar have begun designing, manufacturing, importing, and selling already complete pit bikes. These bikes are less expensive, and require less time to complete.

Pit bikes are powered by 4-stroke, horizontal, single-cylinder engines ranging anywhere in displacement from 49 cc to 195 cc. A typical pit bike is usually a small dirt bike, but it has become common to be able to buy pit bikes with street-style wheels and tires. Pit bikes with street tires, as opposed to knobby tires, are used in Mini Supermoto Racing.

Pit bikes are frequently heavily customized with decorative add-ons and performance-enhancing parts. Many riders and mechanics bore-out or replace engines to increase displacement and therefore power output. Heavy duty suspension systems are often a necessary addition, since the stock mini-bike suspension was designed for a small child. Wheel, brake, and tire upgrades are sometimes performed to improve handling.

Pit bikes also have their own separate competitions held with classes generally corresponding to wheel size. This is a notable difference from Motocross and Supercross competition, where classes are separated by engine displacement. Pit bike racing is a relatively new niche of motocross, and as such, there is no official governing body similar to the AMA.

=== Velocross ===
In Brazil, velocross is a motocross derived category with no jumps, and a bigger focus on speed.

== Equipment ==
=== Motocross motorcycle ===
Major manufacturers

- Beta (Italy)
- Honda (Japan)
- KTM (Austria)
- Yamaha (Japan)
- Ducati (Italy)
- Husqvarna (Austria)
- Suzuki (Japan)
- Gas Gas (Spain/Austria)
- Kawasaki (Japan)
- Triumph (England)

Minor

- Fantic (Italy), Yamaha-based designs.
- Rieju (Spain) Supermoto
- TM (Italy), Large market share.
- Kove (China)
- Sherco (France & Spain) Supermoto

Niche market manufactures

- AJP (Portugal)
- Aprilia (Italy)
- Benelli (Italy)
- BMW Motorrad (Germany)
- Cagiva (Italy)
- ATK (USA)
- CCM (UK)
- Cobra (USA)
- Demak (Malaysia)
- Derbi (Spain)
- GPX Racing (Thailand)
- Minsk (Belarus)
- Mojo Motorcycles (Australia)
- Montesa (Spain)
- MXF (Brazil)
- Ossa (Spain)
- Polini (Italy)
- Pitster Pro (United States)
- Stallions (Thailand)
- Stark Future (Spain) Electric MX1
- Thumpstar (Australia)
- Viar (Indonesia)

Chinese manufacturers

- Apollo (China)
- SSR Motorsports (China)
- TaoTao (China)
- Coolster (China)

Manufacturers that have ceased production

- BSA (UK) – off-road became CCM
- Bultaco (Spain)
- Can-Am (Canada)
- Cannondale
- Casal (Portugal)
- CCM (UK)
- Cooper (Mexico)
- CZ (Czechoslovakia)
- DKW (East Germany)
- FAMEL (Portugal)
- Fabrique Nationale (Belgium)
- Greeves (UK)
- Hodaka (Japan)
- Harley-Davidson (USA)
- Husaberg (Sweden)
- Maico (Germany)
- Monark (Sweden)
- MYMSA (Catalonia)
- Penton (USA)
- Puch (Austria)
- Rickman (UK)
- Zündapp (Germany)
- Wilcomoto (UK)

== Governing bodies ==
Motocross is governed worldwide by the Fédération Internationale de Motocyclisme (FIM), with federations in many nations.

- Australia – Motorcycling Australia (MA)
- Austria – Osterreichische Automobil, Motorrad und Touring Club (OAMTC)
- Belgium – Federation Motocycliste de Belgique (FMB)
- Brazil – Confederação Brasileira de Motociclismo (CBM)
- Canada – Canadian Motorsport Racing Corp.(CMRC) and Canadian Motorcycle Association (CMA)
- Czech Republic – Autoklub České republiky (ACCR)
- Denmark – Danmarks Motor Union (DMU)
- Estonia – Eesti Motorrattaspordi Föderatsioon (EMF)
- Finland – Suomen Moottoriliitto (SML)
- France – Fédération Française de Motocyclisme (FFM)
- Germany – Deutscher Motor Sport Bund (DMSB)
- India – Federation of Motor Sports Clubs of India (FMSCI)
- Ireland – Motorcycle Union of Ireland (MCUI) – NB covers the whole island
- Italy – Federazione Motociclistica Italiana (FMI)
- Latvia – Latvijas Motosporta Federācija (LaMSF)
- Lithuania – Lietuvos Motociklų Sporto Federacija (LMSF)
- The Netherlands – Koninklijke Nederlandse Motorrijdersvereniging (KNMV), Motorsport Organisatie Nederland (MON)
- New Zealand – Motorcycling New Zealand (MNZ) and New Zealand Dirt Bike Federation
- Norway – Norges Motorsportforbund (NMF)
- Poland – Polski Związek Motorowy (PZM)
- Portugal – Federação Motociclismo Portugal (FMP)
- Russia – Motorcycle Federation of Russia (MFR)
- South Africa – Motorsport South Africa (MSA)
- Spain – Real Federación Motociclista Española (RFME)
- Slovakia – Slovak motorcycle federation (SMF)
- Slovenia – Auto-Cycle Union of Slovenia (AMZS)
- Sweden – Svenska Motorsportförbundet (SVEMO)
- Switzerland – Federation Motocycliste Suisse (FMS)
- Thailand – Federation of Motor Sport Clubs of Thailand (FMSCT)
- United Kingdom – Auto-Cycle Union (ACU), with other separate bodies like the Amateur Motorcycling Association (AMCA), ORPA, BSMA, and YSMA.
- United States – American Motorcyclist Association (AMA)

== See also ==
- Beach racing
- Bicycle Motocross (BMX)
- FIM Motocross World Championship
- List of AMA Motocross Champions
- Outline of motorcycles and motorcycling
- Motorcycle racing
- Women's Professional Motocross
- The Zwarte Cross Festival is the largest paid festival in the Netherlands, and the largest motocross event in the world.The 26th edition in 2024 did count for 265,500 guests.
