= List of 2016 United States cannabis reform proposals =

- 2015 ← → 2017
- Legality of cannabis in the United States (2023)
- Status: Legal for recreational use Legal for medical use Illegal

In 2016, nine U.S. states proposed cannabis reform legislation for medical marijuana and non-medical adult use. As of 2016, the state laws are still at odds with the Federal status of cannabis, which is classified as a Schedule I narcotic. The Los Angeles Times stated that if all the measures passed, nine states encompassing a quarter of the U.S. population would have legalized recreational use, and "The presence of legalization measures on the ballot in Arkansas and North Dakota — both staunchly conservative states — illustrate the power of the trend toward legalization" and Federal reforms on banking are "increasingly looking inevitable".

State	Short description	Detail
Arkansas	Medical	Arkansas Medical Cannabis Act (Issue 6, a constitutional amendment; and Issue 7, a voter initiative, both appear on the ballot)
Arizona	Legalization	Proposition 205
California	Legalization	Adult Use of Marijuana Act
Florida	Medical	Amendment 2
Maine	Legalization	Question 1
Massachusetts	Legalization	Massachusetts Legalization, Regulation and Taxation of Marijuana Initiative
Montana	Medical	Montana I-182 (amends existing 2004 law)
Nevada	Legalization	Question 2
North Dakota	Medical	Measure 5
