= Cannabis policy of the Trump administration =

The cannabis policy of the Trump administration may refer to:

- Cannabis policy of the first Trump administration
- Cannabis policy of the second Trump administration
