= Thumpstar =

- Industry: Motorcycle
- Founded: April 2004; 22 years ago
- Founder: Timothy Hunter
- Area served: Australia, New Zealand, Germany, Poland, USA, Ireland, Belgium, Spain, Italy, Canada, France
- Website: www.thumpstar.com.au

Thumpstar is a pit bike manufacturer that was founded in Australia in 2004 by Timothy Hunter, a motor-cycle dealer and racer.

== History ==
Hunter came across a pit bike at a 2003 trade fair. He considered that he could improve on the model and make his own pit bikes. In April 2004 with the assistance of a Taiwanese Company Thumpstar bikes began to be produced.

=== First two years ===
The first Thumpstar models were released into the market between 2004 and 2006. They were the JNR 90cc, Super Hunge 110cc and the Professional Hunge 125cc. The most successful was the Professional Hunge with its CNC TUV certified full billet T6 heat treated alloy frame. Thumpstar became a well-known pit bike brand with global sales turnover reaching more than A$45 million in its first 13 months of business.

Problems with infrastructure and trademark infringements by other company's selling counterfeit Thumpstars caused its demise.

=== Terra Moto ===
Learning from this, Hunter, in 2007, changed Thumpstar's name to Terra Moto and secured its intellectual property. Unlike Thumpstar, the models didn't sell well and shortly after manufacturing ceased.

=== New beginnings ===
In 2012, an agreement was signed May 10, to restart the company with 3 new models: the TSX 88cc, TSX 125cc and TSR 160cc. From 2013 Thumpstar began developing junior motocross bikes, releasing its TSB-C, TSX-C and TSR-C competition models in 2015. Thumpstars have competed in the world mini moto champs in Las Vegas, with riders including Mike Brown, Dan Cartwright and Mike Leavitt.

By 2015 Thumpstar was making sixteen models from 50cc to 250cc and five varieties: the TSB(basic), TSX(Mid-Range), TSR(Racing), TSK(Kids) and TSC(Competition). The bikes were designed for youths, trail riding, Motocross and pit bike racing. In April 2015 Thumpstar declared chartreuse as its official colour.

=== Improvement ===
In 2016 model upgrades include Pipe Bomb DW-1 Exhaust on the TSX and TSR models to obtain better performance. Ts300 2 stroke introduced. The TSR 150 advantages from additional improvements to suspension, damping and handling with the newest designed rear linkage, whereas the TSX 140 enjoys a brand new seven Series aluminium rims and an upgraded exhaust. The TSK 50 has been fully redesigned and created as child friendly as attainable, together with smaller geometry, front and rear brake controls on the handlebars and removable training wheels.

Freestyle Motocross

2023 Thumpstar becomes first Chinese manufactured motorcycle to backflip 75ft to dirt on a full sized FMX ramp by Callum Shaw

500cc two-stroke

In 2025, Thumpstar unveiled a full-size 500cc two-stroke motorcycle at AIMExpo in Las Vegas. The prototype used a BRC Racing 500cc engine featuring a counterbalancer, six-speed transmission and electric start. The engine was an original BRC design, with BRC manufacturing some components and Thumpstar manufacturing the remaining engine components for the project. Thumpstar stated that the motorcycle was developed with the intention of returning a 500cc two-stroke dirt bike to production after an absence of more than 20 years

2026 Erzbergrodeo Hard Enduro

In 2026, Polish rider Paweł Sawicki qualified a Thumpstar TSN-300 N2 for the Red Bull Erzbergrodeo main race in Austria, becoming the first rider on a Chinese-manufactured motorcycle to qualify for the event. Sawicki reached Checkpoint 9 before exceeding the event time limit.

Jotagas Spain Partnership

In 2019, Thumpstar partnered with Spanish motorcycle manufacturer Jotagas on the development of a new 300 cc two-stroke enduro motorcycle. The project involved Josep Pibernat, a co-founder of GasGas, the Development combined the Spanish-made two-stroke engine platform. The project was publicly revealed in 2019 at Columbus AimesXpo USA and later influenced the development of Thumpstar’s N2 range.

== Frame design ==
Thumpstar was the first pit bike company to manufacture bikes with an alloy frame. The model Pro Hunge 25 which used the alloy frame was one of Thumpstar's most popular models, as it was lightweight and performed well. This model can be found in countries around the world.

== Models ==
- Hunge 10 (discontinued)
- Hunge 25 (discontinued)
- TSK 50
- TSB 70
- TSB 110
- TSX 125
- TSX 141
- TSF 150
- TSF 230
- TSF 250
- TSF 300
- R 250
- TSN 300
- X 300
