= Cole Memorandum =

2013 memo by US Deputy Attorney General

The Cole Memorandum was sent to all United States Attorneys and was formally titled "Guidance Regarding Marijuana Enforcement".

The Cole Memorandum was a United States Department of Justice memorandum issued August 29, 2013, by United States Deputy Attorney General James M. Cole during the presidency of Barack Obama. The memorandum, sent to all United States Attorneys, governed federal prosecution of offenses related to marijuana. The memo stated that given its limited resources, the Justice Department would not enforce federal marijuana prohibition in states that "enacted laws legalizing marijuana in some form and ... implemented strong and effective regulatory and enforcement systems to control the cultivation, distribution, sale, and possession of marijuana," except where a lack of federal enforcement would undermine federal priorities (such as preventing violence in marijuana cultivation and distribution, preventing cannabis impaired driving, and preventing marijuana revenues from going to gangs and cartels).

The Cole Memorandum was rescinded by Attorney General Jeff Sessions in January 2018, during the presidency of Donald Trump.

== Issuance ==
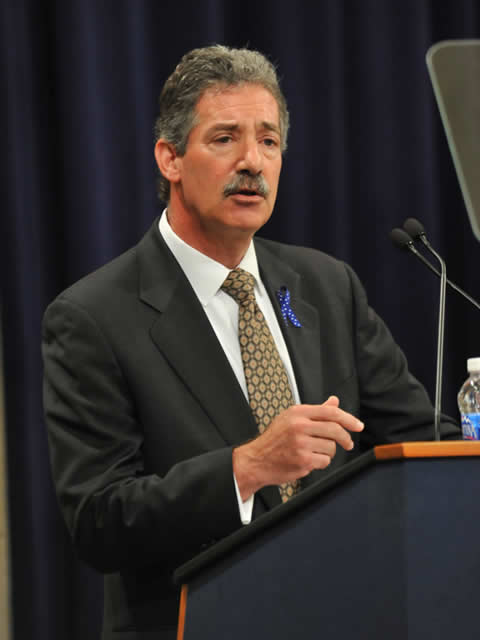
James M. Cole

On August 29, 2013, the Department of Justice published a memorandum authored by Cole which described a new set of priorities for federal prosecutors operating in states which had legalized the medical or other use of marijuana. The "Cole memo" followed a 2009 memorandum from Deputy Attorney General David W. Ogden directing U.S. Attorneys in the Western United States to "not focus federal resources in your States on individuals whose actions are in clear and unambiguous compliance with existing state laws providing for the medical use of marijuana". The 2013 memorandum represented a significant shift of government priorities away from strict enforcement of federal cannabis prohibition and toward a more hands-off approach in the case of "jurisdictions that have enacted laws legalizing marijuana in some form and that have also implemented strong and effective regulatory and enforcement systems to control the cultivation, distribution, sale and possession of marijuana." Indeed, Cole's memo went so far as to state that "a robust system may affirmatively address [federal] priorities by, for example, implementing effective measures to prevent diversion of marijuana outside the regulated system and to other states, prohibiting access to marijuana by minors, and replacing an illicit marijuana trade that funds criminal enterprises with a tightly regulated market in which revenues are tracked and accounted for." Since that date, although federal prosecutions have continued in some legalizing states (notably in the Kettle Falls Five case), the overall number of federal marijuana prosecutions in such states has declined.

== Review ==
The single-page January 4, 2018 memorandum signed by Jeff Sessions rescinding the Cole Memo

States with legalized cannabis were concerned about the incoming Trump administration's handling of the Cole Memo and their congressional representatives and governors saw Attorney General Jeff Sessions as adamantly opposed to its continuation. Anti-legalization groups like Smart Approaches to Marijuana requested a review or revocation of the memorandum. The federal government's position was vague, with Deputy Attorney General Rod J. Rosenstein saying in mid-June "maybe there will be changes to it [the Cole Memorandum] in the future, but we're still operating under that policy".

Around June 2017, a Justice Department task force was convened to review the Cole Memo and other Obama-era decisions; it was headed by Michael Murray, Counsel to Deputy Attorney General Rosenstein. The committee's report was finalized June 27, 2017 and released to the public in August when it was found to have "no new policy recommendations", and recommended that the Trump Administration Attorney General "should evaluate whether to maintain, revise or rescind" the memo.

== Rescission ==
The memorandum was rescinded by a one-page memo signed by Attorney General Jeff Sessions on January 4, 2018. Governors and United States senators from several states including Alaska, California, Colorado, Nevada, New Jersey, Oregon, Vermont and Washington immediately expressed displeasure at the decision.

Legal and political experts expressed varied reactions to Sessions' 2018 memo. Some said that it would not fundamentally change the existing system, with power to prosecute remaining in the hands of various U.S. Attorneys. Law professor and author Ilya Somin called the decision an "assault on federalism". Political columnist Jacob Sullum said it could be seen as justified reaction to the Obama Administration's use of executive actions.

== Merrick Garland's view ==
In response to questions posed by Senator Cory Booker, President Biden's United States Attorney General, Merrick Garland, stated during February 2021 congressional testimony that he would reinstitute a version of the Cole Memorandum. He reiterated the statement that the Justice Department under his leadership would not pursue cases against Americans "complying with the laws in states that have legalized and are effectively regulating marijuana", in written responses to the Senate Judiciary Committee provided around March 1.

== See also ==
- Marijuana policy of the Donald Trump administration
