= Cannabis policy of the second Trump administration =

US government policy

The second Donald Trump administration saw an executive order to remove cannabis from Schedule I of the Controlled Substances Act, commonly known as marijuana rescheduling. State-legal medical cannabis was moved to Schedule III on April 27, 2026.

== Early statements ==
Trump made several campaign promises to allow U.S. states to individually determine the legality of cannabis on their own accord. He has frequently voiced that cannabis should be a states' rights issue, despite repeating, "marijuana opened the door to disorder in Washington, D.C." in a fact sheet signed off by Trump personally. He also said that he would vote yes on Amendment 3 which would have allowed adult-use recreational cannabis legalization in his home state of Florida.

== Administration policy personnel ==
Trump nominated Sara A. Carter to be the director of the Office of National Drug Control Policy (or "drug czar") in March 2025. Carter's background was "not in drug policy, public health, or law enforcement, and she has never served in government". During her September 2025 U.S. Senate confirmation hearings, she stated that she would "comply with all federal laws" regarding enforcement, and "explore all options" relative to cannabis rescheduling process begun in the Biden administration.

Robert F. Kennedy Jr., before he was brought into the administration to lead U.S. Department of Health and Human Services, had "a long track record of supporting drug policy reform, including cannabis reform", and during his 2024 presidential campaign, had said that "he wanted to legalize marijuana".

"Well-known drug-policy lawyer" Matthew Zorn, who had previously worked on cannabis issues, was hired to be "psychedelics czar" at Department of Health and Human Services in May.

== Lobbying ==
Behind-the-doors lobbying of the administration by representatives of cannabis industry and civil cannabis reform entities began almost as soon as the second administration commenced. Businesspeople Howard Kessler and Kim Rivers (CEO of Trulieve) were listed by Politico as influential on the administration's decision making process.

== 2025–2026 rescheduling ==
In August 2025, the administration announced it would make a rescheduling decision "in weeks".

Removal of cannabis from Schedule I of the Controlled Substances Act was subject of an Executive Order 14370, signed on December 18, 2025, which BBC report called "the most significant shift in US drug policy in decades". The executive order section 2 directed U.S. Attorney General Pam Bondi to "take all necessary steps" to carry out rescheduling "in the most expeditious manner in accordance with Federal law". These actions are expected in 2026, followed by a public comment period, though the Attorney General may interpret the "expeditious" order to waive public comment. In any case, rescheduling will likely face court challenges from opponents of the policy; at least one industry newsletter said lawsuits were "guaranteed" and named Smart Approaches to Marijuana as having retained legal assets to do so as of December 22, 2025.

The White House website listed goals of EO 14370 as including "to work with Congress to allow Americans to benefit from access to appropriate full-spectrum CBD products", to be carried out by White House Deputy Chief of Staff for Legislative, Political, and Public Affairs (James Blair) and "to develop research methods and models utilizing real-world evidence to improve access to hemp-derived cannabinoid products in accordance with Federal law and to inform standards of care", to be carried out by Department of Health and Human Services.

In April 2026, Axios reported that "the Trump administration is expected to move to reclassify marijuana as soon as Wednesday [April 26], per an administration official familiar with the matter." This was followed by confirmation from The Washington Post.

The acting United States Attorney General, Todd Blanche, reclassified state-licensed medical cannabis to Schedule III on April 23, 2026. Blanche stated that the process of rescheduling cannabis more broadly would proceed via the DEA hearings process set out by the Controlled Substances Act. Associated Press reported the hearings would occur in June 2026.

In reaction to the change in legal status of medical cannabis, in particular the withdrawal of IRS 280E rule preventing deduction of business expenses on taxes, and the potential for future adult-use rescheduling, The New York Times said "the Trump administration is pushing major policy changes that could hand marijuana companies a huge windfall and unlock new investment in the industry".

== Hemp policy ==
Industry observers said that the administration's stance on hemp was "refreshing" but "felt whiplash, as the White House seemed to contradict the hemp ban Congress wrote into the funding bill" that ended the 2025 United States federal government shutdown.

== See also ==
- Cannabis policy of the first Trump administration
- Mehmet Oz § Marijuana
