= Cannabis in Nevada =

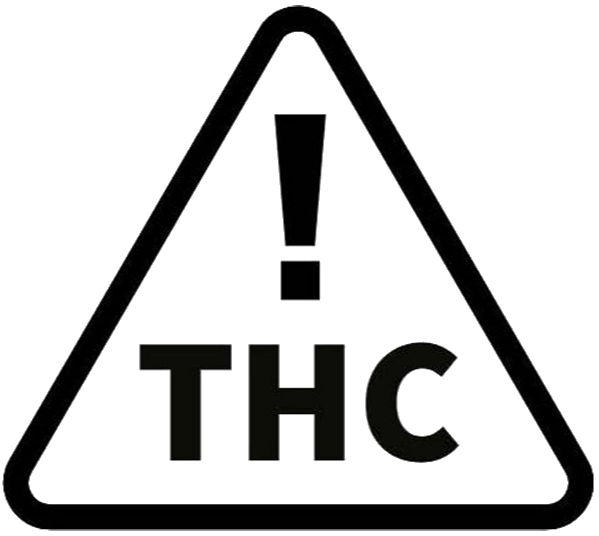
Nevada's Cannabis Universal Symbol

Cannabis in Nevada became legal for recreational use on January 1, 2017, following the passage of Question 2 on the 2016 ballot with 54% of the vote. The first licensed sales of recreational cannabis began on July 1, 2017.

Medical use was legalized after a pair of ballot measures passed in 1998 and 2000. Legislation to allow for licensed sales was approved separately in 2013. The first medical cannabis dispensary opened on July 31, 2015.

== Prohibition (1923) ==
Nevada first banned cannabis in 1923, during a nationwide trend of states limiting the drug between 1911 and 1933.

== Reforms ==
=== Nevada Medical Marijuana Act (1998, 2000) ===
A ballot measure to legalize cannabis for medical use, the Nevada Medical Marijuana Act, passed with 59% of the vote in 1998. It passed for a second time in 2000 with 65% of the vote. The initiative was required to pass in two consecutive elections because it sought to amend the state constitution.

Medical use was officially legalized with the June 2001 passage of Assembly Bill 453, which took effect on October 1.

=== Defelonization (2001) ===
Assembly Bill 453 also contained a provision to make possession of up to one ounce a fine-only misdemeanor, only resulting in criminal charges for a third offense.

Prior to the passage of AB 453, Nevada was the only state for which possessing any amount of cannabis was a felony.

=== Failed recreational use initiative – 2002 ===
A ballot measure to legalize cannabis for recreational use, Question 9, failed with 39% of the vote in 2002. Titled the Decriminalization of Marijuana Amendment, the measure would have legalized the possession of up to three ounces of cannabis and allowed it to be sold at dispensaries. The measure was opposed by drug czar John P. Walters who traveled to Nevada twice to campaign against its passage.

=== Failed recreational use initiative – 2006 ===
A second initiative to legalize cannabis for recreational use, the Regulation of Marijuana Initiative (Question 7), failed with 44% of the vote in 2006. It would have legalized the possession of up to an ounce of cannabis and allowed it to be sold at dispensaries, while also increasing penalties for some cannabis offenses.

=== Initiative to Regulate and Tax Marijuana (2016) ===
2016 Question 2 results by county. Counties shaded in darker blue indicate higher support. Counties shaded in darker yellow indicate stronger opposition.

Recreational use of cannabis was legalized after the Initiative to Regulate and Tax Marijuana (Question 2) passed with 54% of the vote on November 8, 2016. Possession of up to one ounce of cannabis became legal for adults 21 and over on January 1, 2017. The initiative also allows adults to cultivate up to six plants if they live more than 25 miles from a dispensary. The first dispensaries opened to the public on July 1, 2017.

Question 2 was opposed by casino magnate Sheldon Adelson, who donated $3.35 million to the campaign to defeat the initiative. Adelson also purchased the Las Vegas Review-Journal in December 2015, after which the editorial board reversed its earlier endorsement of the initiative. Prior to the flip-flop, the Review-Journal supported legalization as far back as 2002. The main sponsor in support of the initiative was Marijuana Policy Project.

=== Consumption lounges legalized (2021) ===
In June 2021, Governor Steve Sisolak signed Assembly Bill 341, allowing the operation of alcohol-free consumption lounges where adults can purchase and consume cannabis products. Lounges can be either stand-alone independent businesses or attached to existing dispensaries. The lounges offer tourists a venue to consume cannabis outside a private home.

In November 2022, the Cannabis Compliance Board announced the issuance of 40 prospective licenses for consumption lounges. Of those, three were issued conditional licenses in June 2023.

The first lounge to open in the state was at Nuwu Cannabis Marketplace, operated by the Las Vegas Pauite Tribe, in October 2019. The first to open on non-tribal land was Smoke and Mirrors lounge operated by THRIVE Cannabis Marketplace in February 2024. Clark County Commissioner Tick Segerblom became the first customer to consume cannabis on-site when he lit up a joint at 4:20 pm on opening day.

=== Possession limit and licensing reforms (2023) ===
In June 2023, Governor Joe Lombardo signed into law a bill to increase possession limits from 1 ounce of flower to 2.5, and from 1/8 ounce of concentrate to 1/4, effective January 1, 2024. The bill also allowed recreational cannabis licenses to serve dually as medical cannabis licenses, and allowed people with felony convictions to obtain licenses if certain criteria are met.

== Medical cannabis implementation ==
=== Delays and permit process (2002–2013) ===
Following the establishment of NRS 453, broad language in the statute prevented the erection of a state licensure program for commercial businesses. Personal cultivation of marijuana for private medicinal use was the only available means of consumption, with a maximum of 12 plants allowed. Medical marijuana advocates and commercial business owners criticized the Nevada's slow handling of the legislative and regulatory process. One 42 year-old Las Vegas resident even filed a class-action lawsuit alleging that Nevada's medical marijuana registration program was unconstitutional for its excessive impedances and delays.

=== First commercial operations (2013–2016) ===
It was not until June 12, 2013, when Senate Bill 374 was passed and signed into law by Governor Brian Sandoval that commercial distribution was made possible. The process, however, continued to take time. A contributing factor to the state's slow commercial license approval process was the limited availability of licenses and a lengthy scoring and ranking system. The first provisional certificates for legal commercial medical marijuana operations were limited to 372 businesses within the state: 182 for cultivation, 118 for production, 55 for dispensaries, and 17 for independent testing laboratories. Twelve licenses were initially awarded to dispensaries, sparking "fierce competition" among applicants. Journalist Bruce Barcott of Leafly posited that the thorough vetting process created a favorable environment to patients of the dispensaries, as "applicants were graded in a host of categories — security, financing, environmental plan, etc. — and the most robust business plans won the coveted licenses. For patients, that means the dispensaries are well-financed, beautifully designed, and expertly managed." The first dispensary opened on July 31, 2015, in Sparks.

The Nevada Department of Health and Human Services states that there were 9,542 cardholding participating patients as of July 2015. 6716 of these patients were located within Clark County. As of February 3, 2016, there are 5 laboratories, 19 cultivation facilities, 8 production facilities, and 15 licensed dispensaries operating in Clark County. Sales figures as of that time were not available, but one dispensary assistant manager estimates that they receive 50 to 70 patients a day on average, roughly 60% of which are tourists. At the time, there were about "11,000 medical-card holders" living in southern Nevada.

=== Requirements for legal patient use ===
The following are approved conditions for legal medical use of marijuana or marijuana products: AIDS, cachexia, cancer, glaucoma, post-traumatic stress disorder (PTSD), persistent muscle spasms or seizures, and severe nausea or pain. Other conditions are subject to approval.

The state of Nevada maintains strict control over the use of medical marijuana in certain situations. Consumption in a public place, at a detention or correctional facility, or during delivery of marijuana to another person is illegal. Performing certain recreational activities under the influence of marijuana is illegal (for instance, operating a water ski, surfboard, windsail or similar device). Possession of a firearm, licensed or unlicensed, while under the influence is illegal.

For operating a motor vehicle, the state maintains a permissible limit of 10 nanograms of THC per milliliter of urine and 2 nanograms per milliliter of blood. Violators will be penalized with a $400 fine, 2 days in jail, 48 – 96 hours of community service to $5000 fine and 1 – 6 years in prison depending on the first, second and third offence. Operating an aircraft while under the influence is also illegal.

==== Legal possession amounts ====
State law currently allows for the possession of 2.5 ounces of consumable marijuana in any 14-day period (NRS 453A.160). Twelve marijuana plants are permitted, irrespective of their maturity (NAC 453A.080). Consumable products are permitted with an equivalent content of psychoactive compounds such as THC (NRS 453A.112). The state of Nevada conducted a public workshop on February 4, 2016, in order to solidify proposed changes to NRS 453 defining serving sizes for edible products containing THC as well as clarifying language within the statute.

==== Application process for an MMR card ====
The process of obtaining a permit to consume medical marijuana in Nevada begins with the applicant paying the $25 application fee for their application packet. Upon receiving the packet, they must satisfy the needed documentation and return the packet to the state Division of Public and Behavioral Health. Needed materials include an attending physician's statement from a Nevada board-certified physician in good standing, a legal waiver, and proof of Nevada residency.

Applicants mail the application along with a $75 registration fee. The application is verified for completeness, and the applicant undergoes a background check for drug-related criminal history. If no felony charges for distribution or trafficking of controlled substances, the applicant will be approved for their MMR card subject to further approval by the Division. An approval letter is sent, which the patient may use for 14 days as a viable permit until their photo ID MMR card is received in the mail.

Registry cards must be renewed yearly. Anyone leaving the registry program must surrender their card to the state within 7 days.

==== Reciprocity for other programs ====
Nevada is a state which recognizes reciprocity for out-of-state marijuana card holders. For example, the state of Nevada recognizes MMR and MMJ cardholders from other states with regulated medical marijuana programs, such as Colorado and Washington. According to Leafly, permissive practices and a strong tourism industry in Las Vegas has made the city a viable test case for how reciprocity policies affect income for the medical marijuana and tourism industries. Some dispensaries estimate that around half of their business comes from out-of-state cardholders.

== See also ==
- List of 2016 United States cannabis reform proposals
- Cannabis in the United States
