= Arkansas Medical Cannabis Act =

Disqualified ballot measure

The Arkansas Medical Cannabis Act (AMCA) is a ballot measure that initially qualified for the ballot in Arkansas (as Issue 7) but was disqualified by the Arkansas Supreme Court 12 days before the November 8, 2016 election. A separate measure to legalize medical cannabis, the Arkansas Medical Marijuana Amendment (Issue 6), also qualified for the 2016 ballot and was approved by voters.

== History ==
The wording of the initiative's title was approved by the Arkansas Attorney General in August, 2014, allowing the process of collecting signatures for the initiative to begin. The sponsor of the act, Arkansans for Compassionate Care, submitted 117,469 petition signatures to the state authorities for verification in June 2016. It was certified for the ballot on July 7. The act had a provision to collect sales tax and apportion some of the revenue to subsidize medical cannabis for low-income patients.

== See also ==
- Cannabis in Arkansas
- List of 2016 United States cannabis reform proposals
