= Air Movement and Control Association =

American Trade Organization

The Air Movement and Control Association International, Inc. (AMCA) is an international trade body that sets standards for Heating, Ventilation and Air Conditioning (HVAC) equipment. It rates fan balance and vibration, aerodynamic performance, air density, speed and efficiency.

AMCA was formed in 1955 from several earlier trade associations which could be tracked back to the fan-testing requirements of the US Navy in 1923. It is a nonprofit organization that issues over 60 publications and standards, including testing methods, a Certified Ratings Program (CRP), application guides, educational texts, and safety guides.

== Membership and activities ==
AMCA membership is open to any company that manufactures or holds the design of a product that falls under the AMCA scope.

AMCA publications and standards are developed when sufficient interest has been expressed by AMCA members. Publication and standard writing committees are composed of volunteers, which include both AMCA members and interested individuals with a technical background. All AMCA standards are proposed as American National Standards.

AMCA lobbies code bodies on behalf of member companies to ensure that member company products are represented in local and national codes.

AMCA hosts two educational seminars in alternating years. The AMCA inside Technical Seminar provides engineers with basic information regarding devices and engineering principles relevant to the air movement and air control industry. The Engineering Conference is a discussion forum for presentation of engineering papers written by engineers and experts in the air movement and control industry. U.S. licensed engineers attending either seminar are eligible for approximately 12 Professional Development Hours.

The AMCA headquarters is located at 30 West University Drive, Arlington Heights, IL 60004 USA.

== Certified ratings program ==
The AMCA Certified Ratings Program (CRP) is a program that allows all manufacturers of air movement and air control devices to obtain an AMCA Seal when their equipment has been tested and rated in accordance with recognized test standards.

The goal of the AMCA CRP is to ensure that a manufacturer's product lines have been tested and rated in conformance with an approved test standard and rating requirement. Only after the product has been tested and the manufacturer's cataloged ratings have been submitted to and approved by AMCA International's staff, can performance seals be displayed in literature and on equipment. Additionally, each certified / licensed product line is subject to continuing check tests every three years in AMCA International's Laboratory or one of AMCA International's Independent Accredited laboratories.

== Publications and standards ==
AMCA International publishes over 64 publications and standards, including testing methods, a Certified Ratings Program (CRP), application guides, educational texts, and safety guides. AMCA is an accredited ANSI developer, and all AMCA standards are proposed as American National Standards.

=== Testing standards ===
- ANSI/AMCA Standard 204 - Balance Quality and Vibration Levels for Fans addresses the subjects of fan balance and vibration. It defines appropriate fan balance quality and operating vibration levels to those who specify, manufacture, use, and maintain fan equipment.
- ANSI/AMCA Standard 210 - Laboratory Methods of Testing Fans for Certified Aerodynamic Performance Rating establishes uniform test methods for a laboratory test of a fan or other air moving device to determine its aerodynamic performance in terms of airflow rate, pressure developed, power consumption, air density, speed of rotation, and efficiency for rating or guarantee purposes. It applies to a fan or other air moving device when air is used as the test gas with the following exceptions: (a) air circulating fans (ceiling fans, desk fans); (b) positive pressure ventilators; (c) compressors with inter-stage cooling; (d) positive displacement machines; (e) test procedures to be used for design, production, or field testing.
- ANSI/AMCA Standard 220 - Laboratory Methods of Testing Air Curtain Units For Aerodynamic Performance Rating establishes uniform methods for laboratory testing of air curtain units to determine aerodynamic performance in terms of airflow rate, outlet air velocity uniformity, power consumption and air velocity projection for rating or guarantee purposes.
- ANSI/AMCA Standard 230 - Laboratory Methods of Testing Air Circulating Fans for Rating and Certification establishes uniform methods of laboratory testing for air circulating fans in order to determine performance in terms of thrust for rating, certification or guarantee purposes. The 1999 version, in general, described a method to determine the thrust developed and used a simple equation to convert the measured thrust to airflow. During the periodic review process it was determined that the calculated airflow was too high, therefore this version no longer artificially calculates airflow, but leaves the measured performance in units of thrust.
- ANSI/AMCA Standard 240 - Laboratory Methods of Testing Positive Pressure Ventilators for Aerodynamic Performance Rating establishes a uniform method of laboratory testing of positive pressure ventilators (PPVs) in order to determine the aerodynamic performance in terms of airflow rate, pressure, air density, and speed of rotation for rating or guarantee purposes. PPVs are portable fans that can be positioned relative to an opening of an enclosure and cause it to be positively pressurized by discharge air.
- ANSI/AMCA Standard 250 - Laboratory Methods of Testing Jet Tunnel Fans for Performance was developed in response to the need for a standard method of testing jet tunnel fans, sometimes called impulse fans, which have seen increasing use in the United States. The test procedures outlined in this standard are in harmony with those found in ISO 13350. This standard deals with the determination of those technical characteristics needed to describe all aspects of the performance of jet tunnel fans. It does not cover those fans designed for ducted applications or those designed solely for air circulation, e.g., ceiling fans and table fans. The test procedures described relate to laboratory conditions. The measurement of performance under in-situ conditions is not included.
- ANSI/AMCA Standard 260 - Laboratory Methods of Testing Induced Flow Fans for Rating establishes a uniform method of laboratory testing of induced flow fans in order to determine their aerodynamic performance in terms of inlet and outlet airflow rate, pressure developed, power consumption, air density, speed of rotation, and efficiency. This standard is an adjunct to AMCA 210 in order to accommodate the induced flow fan's unique characteristics. Induced flow fans are housed fans whose outlet airflow is greater than their inlet airflow due to induced airflow. They are generally used in laboratory or hazardous atmosphere exhaust applications.
- ANSI/AMCA Standard 300 - Reverberant Room Method for Sound Testing of Fans applies to fans of all types and sizes. It is limited to the determination of airborne sound emission for the specified setups. Vibration is not measured, nor is the sensitivity of airborne sound emission to vibration effects determined. The test setup requirements in this standard establish the laboratory conditions necessary for a successful test. Rarely will it be possible to meet these requirements in a field situation. This standard is not intended for field measurements.
- ANSI/AMCA Standard 301 - Methods of Calculating Fan Sound Ratings from Laboratory Test Data establishes standard methods for calculating consistent fan sound ratings from laboratory test data.
- ANSI/AMCA Standard 320 - Laboratory Methods of Sound Testing of Fans Using Sound Intensity establishes a method of determining the octave band sound power levels of a fan. The sound power levels are determined using sound intensity measurements on a measurement surface that encloses the sound source. Guidelines are provided on suitable test environment acoustical characteristics, the measurement surface, and the number of intensity measurements. Test setups are designated generally to represent the physical orientation of fans as installed following ANSI/AMCA 210 and also used in ANSI/AMCA 300. The method is reproducible when all requirements of the method are met. This standard applies to fans of all types and sizes. It is limited to the determination of airborne sound emission for the specified setups.
- ANSI/AMCA Standard 500-D - Laboratory Methods of Testing Dampers for Rating establishes uniform laboratory test methods for dampers including air leakage, pressure drop, dynamic closure, operational torque and elevated temperature testing.
- ANSI/AMCA Standard 500-L - Laboratory Methods of Testing Louvers for Rating establishes uniform test methods for louvers including air leakage, pressure drop, water penetration, wind driven rain and operational torque.
- ANSI/AMCA Standard 510 - Methods of Testing Heavy Duty Dampers for Rating establishes testing methods to be used in measuring the performance of dampers generally described as “custom design,” “heavy duty” or “severe service” normally used in applications where elevated temperature, erosion and/or corrosion conditions exist, including dampers which are used to control the flow of gas, or to isolate one section of a duct system from another section of the system.
- ANSI/AMCA Standard 520 - Laboratory Methods for Testing Actuators establishes an industry standard for minimum rating and testing of actuators used on fire/smoke dampers. Requirements cover torque or force rating, long term holding, operational life, elevated temperature performance, periodic maintenance, production, and sound testing for both pneumatic and electric operators.
- AMCA Standard 540 - Test Method for Louvers Impacted by Wind Borne Debris establishes uniform methods for laboratory testing of louvers that are impact tested with the large missile described in ASTM E 1996-04 and E 1886–05.
- ANSI/AMCA Standard 610 - Laboratory Methods of Testing Airflow Measurement Stations for Performance Rating establishes a laboratory test method under which a permanently installed airflow measurement station may be tested for rating. Includes descriptions of the test facility requirements, reference airflow sources and presentation of test results.
- AMCA Standard 803 - Industrial Process/Power Generation Fans: Site Performance Test Standard establishes uniform methods to determine the aerodynamic performance of large fans in-situ. Includes procedures for determining whether the airflow pattern is such that a test can be conducted with confidence.

=== Certified ratings program ===
The following publications provide specifications and guidelines for participants in the Certified Ratings Program.

- AMCA Publication 11 - Certified Ratings Program Operating Manual contains requirements common to all AMCA International's Certified Ratings Programs. Specific requirements that only pertain to a category of product will be found in a Product Rating Manual for that category. Publication 11 is effective on the same date as a Product Rating Manual that references it.
- AMCA Publication 111 - Laboratory Accreditation Program outlines procedure for obtaining AMCA International recognition of a laboratory as qualified to perform tests in accordance with AMCA International test methods. Registration qualifications may be applied to individual test results. The latest revision adds AMCA 260–07, Laboratory Methods of Testing Induced Flow Fans for Rating, to the list of standard test methods in which a laboratory can be accredited to perform.
- AMCA Publication 211 - Certified Ratings Program - Product Rating Manual for Fan Air Performance describes in detail the certification and check test procedures used in implementing the program under which the AMCA International Certified Ratings Seal for air performance is granted.
- AMCA Publication 212 - Certified Ratings Program - Product Rating Manual for Smoke Management Fan Performance describes in detail the certification and check test procedures used in implementing the program under which the AMCA International Certified Ratings Seal for Smoke Management Fans is granted.
- AMCA Publication 311 - Certified Ratings Program - Product Rating Manual for Fan Sound Performance explains in detail the certification procedures for both ducted and non-ducted fans under which the use of the AMCA International Certified Ratings Program Seal for sound performance is granted.
- AMCA Publication 511 - Certified Ratings Program - Product Rating Manual for Air Control Devices describes the certification procedures under which the AMCA International Certified Ratings Seal is granted for sound, air performance, air leakage, water penetration and wind driven rain for air control products.
- AMCA Publication 611 - Certified Ratings Program - Product Rating Manual for Airflow Measurement Devices describes in detail the certification procedure for airflow measurement stations under which the use of the AMCA International Certified Ratings Seal for Airflow Measurement Performance is granted.
- AMCA Publication 1011 - Certified Ratings Program - Product Rating Manual for Acoustical Duct Silencers provides a detailed description of the procedure under which the AMCA International Certified Ratings Seal is granted for acoustical duct silencers.

=== Application guides ===
- AMCA Publication 501 - Application Manual for Louvers provides general information and comments on factors to be considered when designing or specifying installations requiring louvers. It also serves as a guide to understanding the various types of louvers available and includes items to be considered to ensure their proper use.
- AMCA Publication 502 - Damper Application Manual for Heating, Ventilating, and Air Conditioning is a guide to understanding the various types of dampers available and items to be considered for their proper use. Dampers classified as fire dampers, heat dampers, and smoke dampers are not included. Includes much of the information not found in the companion guide, AMCA Publication 503.
- AMCA Publication 503 - Fire, Ceiling (Radiation), Smoke, and Fire/Smoke Damper Application Manual details information for individuals that design, purchase, or specify systems in which fire and/or smoke is a factor. Includes much of the information not found in the companion guide, AMCA Publication 502.
- AMCA Publication 600 - Application Manual for Airflow Measurement Stations is intended to assist designers and users with the proper application, performance considerations, selection and limitations of airflow measurement stations.

=== Educational texts ===
- AMCA Publication 99 - Standards Handbook is a compilation of important AMCA standards that include the Fan Laws, common industry terminology and symbols, classifications for spark resistant construction, and various other useful data.
- AMCA Publication 200 - Air Systems. Part 1 of the Fan Application Manual, this publication provides basic information necessary for the design of energy efficient air systems. This edition includes examples in both the Inch-Pound and SI systems as the reader is provided with basic information on air systems.
- AMCA Publication 201 - Fans and Systems. Part 2 of the Fan Application Manual, discusses the effect of inlet and outlet connections on fan performance. It includes separate axial fan factors and is aimed primarily at the designer of the air moving system.
- AMCA Publication 202 - Troubleshooting. Part 3 of the Fan Application Manual, helps to identify and correct problems with the performance and operation of the air moving system after fan installation.
- AMCA Publication 203 - Field Performance Measurement of Fan Systems. Part 4 of the Fan Application Manual, reviews the methods of making field measurements for calculating the actual performance of the fan and system.
- AMCA Publication 801 - Industrial Process/Power Generation Fans: Specification Guidelines provides information on testing and rating power plant fans and covers construction features and related accessories. Sample equipment specifications are included which outline the information a fan manufacturer requires to select the best fan for an application. Common fan industry practices are also defined and explained.
- AMCA Publication 802 - Establishing Performance Using Laboratory Models outlines methods used to determine the performance of full size power plant fans from tests of models. Provides information on variables that affect fan ratings and establishes rules and limitations in converting the performance of geometrically similar fans.
- AMCA Publication 850 - Heavy Duty Dampers for Isolation and Control provides basic pertinent information in order to simplify communications between damper manufacturers and designers, specifiers, and users of such equipment.
- External Shading Devices in Commercial Buildings - The Impact on Energy Use, Peak Demand, and Glare Control by John Carmody details the several advantages that contribute to a more sustainable building such as reducing solar gain, peak electricity demand and glare conditions. It is intended to help the designer quickly narrow the range of possibilities and understand the impact of shading devices in commercial office buildings during the early stages of design.
- Fan Acoustics - Noise Generation and Control Methods by Alain Guédel discusses the sources of noise generation in fan construction and system installation.

== Testing laboratory ==
The AMCA testing laboratory is an A2LA accredited laboratory that tests air control and air movement devices for members of the air control and air movement industry.

The AMCA lab comprises the following:

- Four Reverberant Sound Rooms ranging in size from 6,300 cu.ft. to 61,700 cu.ft.
- Two Water Test Facilities with chambers capable of simulating eight inches (200 mm) of rain-fall per hour and wind speeds of 50 mph (80 km/h).
- Multi Nozzle Chambers that are capable of measuring airflow up to 88,000 cfm.
- Circulator Fan Facility capable of testing 96 inch fans.
- Acoustic Duct Silencer Facility
- ISO/IEC 17025 accredited

AMCA International also oversees 40 accredited laboratories and two independent, accredited laboratories located in Taiwan and Singapore. Additional independent AMCA accredited laboratories are under construction in Korea and China.

== History ==
The Air Movement and Control Association, International was founded in 1955 when the National Association of Fan Manufacturers (NAFM) combined with the Power Fan Manufacturers Association (PFMA) and the Industrial Unit Heater Association (IUHA). Originally known as the Air Moving and Conditioning Association, AMCA was retitled in 1960 to its current name. In 1996, the AMCA Board of Directors added the term 'International' to AMCA's name in order to better indicate the global scope of AMCA's membership.

In 1923, the first edition of the Fan Test Codes was developed as a result of problems encountered by the U.S. Navy in regards to performance ratings of fans being procured during World War 1. To resolve the issue of variations in testing methods and performance ratings, a joint committee of NAFM and the American Society of Heating and Ventilating Engineers (ASHVE) was formed to develop a standard test code for fans.

When NAFM combined with PFMA and IUHA, the organization's major concern was the accuracy and practicality of the pitot traverse method of testing, and a committee was formed to study various test methods and develop a new test code. To aid in the study, AMCA sponsored research by the Battelle Memorial Institute to compare the test results using the pitot tube test methods and nozzle test methods. The result of this effort was a new revision of the test code, which was published in 1960 as AMCA Standard Test Code for Air Moving Devices, Bulletin 210. Standard 210 became widely accepted and known as virtually the only standard used in the United States and Canada.

In 1985, AMCA expanded its scope to include air control devices, such as louvers, dampers, and airflow measurement stations.

In 1996, AMCA's first accredited laboratory, ITRI, began testing in Taiwan. In 2008, AMCA's second independent accredited laboratory, AFMA, began testing in Singapore.

== See also ==
- Sheet Metal and Air Conditioning Contractors' National Association
- ACCA
- ASHRAE
- ASTM
- Centrifugal fan
