= Kettle Falls Five =

The Kettle Falls Five is a name given to five defendants who were charged with 5 violations of federal law including growing, cultivating and distributing cannabis and firearms charges at their 33-acre property near the town of Kettle Falls in eastern Washington. This prosecution was done despite the defendants adherence to Washington State law allowing the growing of cannabis for medical use. One of the defendants, cancer patient Larry Harvey, was not permitted to argue his medical need for the plant in court. Despite this handicap, the defendants were acquitted of 4 out of 5 counts in federal court in Spokane, Washington on March 3, 2015.

== Background ==
Rhonda Firestack-Harvey, her husband Larry Harvey, her son Rolland Gregg and his wife Michelle Gregg, and Jason Zucker were growing cannabis on their 33-acre property near the town of Kettle Falls. The property was marked with a large green cross visible from the air, and consisted of an outdoor garden containing either 74 plants or 68 plants.

The defendants had state authorization to grow 15 plants each, and the total number of plants was under the 75 allowed by the Washington State law.

All five defendants had doctors' letters recommending marijuana for the treatment of various conditions, including gout, anorexia, rheumatoid arthritis, degenerative disc disease and chronic back pain from a broken back. This garden was raided by the federal government in 2012, and federal charges were laid against this group.

When Larry Harvey was held in custody after his arrest, he was denied his medication and an appropriate diet for his medical conditions. As a result, he never fully regained the use of his legs, which forced him to rely on a wheelchair for the rest of his life. Prior to the arrest, Larry was in good enough health to work as a trucker and maintain his large rural property.

== Trial ==
Prosecutors dropped the charges against Larry Harvey citing his terminal cancer. Jason Zucker pleaded guilty and agreed to testify against the other defendants just prior to trial and was sentenced to 16 months of prison time, a reduction from a potential 15 years if convicted on all charges. The remaining defendants faced charges of growing, possessing and distributing cannabis, as well as firearms charges for guns found in their house that adjoined the grow. During the course of the trial, the defense was prohibited from talking about medical marijuana or adherence to state rules regulating it.

== Verdict ==
The remaining three defendants were acquitted of all charges except growing marijuana, and sentencing was set for June 10, 2015.

== Sentences ==
- Jason Zucker was sentenced to 16 months as a part of a plea deal.
- Larry Harvey had his charges dropped, prosecutors citing terminal cancer.
- Rolland Gregg received a sentence of 33 months.
- Michelle Gregg and Rhonda Firestack-Harvey both received a year and a day.

== Related ruling ==
On August 16, 2016, the 9th circuit court issued a ruling in United States vs McIntosh that forbids the prosecution of medical marijuana growers who are following state law as all of the defendants here claimed.

== Appeal ==
On October 16, 2017 Earl A. Hicks, Assistant United States Attorney, filed MOTION FOR REMAND AND/OR STAY OF APPELLATE PROCEEDINGS wherein "The United States submits that the legal authority and facts cited by Appellants on the above-stated issue clearly shows the United States was not authorized to spend money on the continued prosecution of the defendants after December 2014. This includes spending money on the present appeal."
