= Amateur Motorcycling Association =

The Amateur Motorcycle Association (AMCA) is a non-profit making governing body for off road motorcycling sport in the United Kingdom. Based in Cannock, Staffordshire, the organisation has over 200 affiliate clubs, catering for motocross, trials, enduro and historical motocross.

The organisation is based around amateur riders, with one of the organisation's main objectives being that motorcycles ridden by members and all modified parts fitted are on general sale.

Initially formed in 1932, the organisation was based primarily around the West Midlands, but has since spread across the United Kingdom. The organisation is part of the IMBA (International Motorsport Bond for Amateurs) and some of the AMCA's top motocross rider compete in European championships against European counterparts from similar organisations.

The AMCA also owns several race tracks in the UK, along with ancillary equipment that is regularly used by AMCA clubs to stage race meetings.

== AMCA Championships ==
=== Championships ===
Each year Championships are run for the MX1, MX2 and Sidecar classes, usually 8 events with 3 races at each event and with all races counting.

Riders qualify to compete in the AMCA MX1 & MX2 Class solo Championships in local events, usually in the previous season. Sidecars usually go straight through to the Championship but qualifying events may be run should the number of entries exceed the number of Championship places.

Riders must have held an AMCA Licence in the previous season but if room permits new riders may be allowed to ride in qualifying races without having held a licence previously.

WALL OF CHAMPIONS
YEAR	MX2 / 125cc	250cc	MX1 / 500cc / 750cc	SUPERCLASS	SIDECARS
1952				Ray Edwards	
1953				Ray Edwards	
1954		M Mills	Tony Kemp		
1955		Norman Taylor	Stan Potts	Ray Edwards	
1956		Chris Brookes	Stan Potts	Norman Jukes	
1957		Bob Betts	Les Malcolm		
1958		Frank Hipkin	N/A		
1959		Frank Hipkin	Les Malcolm		
1960		Frank Hipkin	Sam Grigg		
1961		Frank Hipkin	Sam Grigg		
1962		Peter Shemwell	Gordon Mycock		Archie Grahame & Keith Brown
1963		Richard Harvey	Richard Harvey		Archie Grahame & Keith Brown
1964		Jimmy Hart	David Faulkener		John Wolverston & Pete Davis
1965		John Hill	Albert Eastwood		Archie Grahame & Arthur Jones
1966		John Burton	John Duncombe		Archie Grahame & Arthur Jones
1967		Les Powderhill	John Duncombe		Archie Grahame & Arthur Jones
1968		John Guest	Roger Trusselle		John Wolverson & Pete Davis
1969		John Guest	Roger Trusselle		John Wolverson & Mick Rushton
1970		John Guest	John York		Terry Salter & John Davies
1971		Mick Hewitt	John Williams		Terry Salter & John Davies
1972		Keith Abrahams	Bernie Andrews	Ken Myles	Terry Salter & John Davies
1973		Keith Abrahams	Roger Trusselle	John Williams	John Wolverson & George Racz
1974		Keith Abrahams	Bernie Andrews	Dave Elesmore	Ray Round & Ken Sidaway
1975		Colin Harrison	Mike Eatough	Cliff Barton	John Snape & Rob Todd
1976		Keith Abrahams	John Williams	John Williams	John Snape & Rob Todd
1977		Bill Cocker	John Williams	Dick Clayton	John Snape & Rob Todd
1978	Steve Hogg	Dave Thorpe	John Williams	Dave Thorpe	John York & Chris Herbert
1979	Mick Oddy	Robert Bentham	John Williams	Robert Bentham	Steve Bann & Terry Bann
1980	Roy Cook	Gary Embleton	Mike Frost	Nick Offler	Colin Pritchard & Carl Trussler
1981	Barry Shakles	Mark Fulton	Phil Rowett	Alan Blood	Steve Hague & Jim O'Meara
1982	Barry Shakles	Gary Skelding	Peter Archer	Mike Church	Steve Hague & Chris Herbert
1983	Brendon Rowett	Robert Meek	Phil Small	Peter Archer	Nigel Pinchbeck & Martin Guilford
1984	Barry Johnson	Gary Evans	Phil Small	Gary Evans	Steve Hague & Jim O'Meara
1985	Richard Main	Barry Johnson	Andy Breacher	Derek Roberts	Ian Osbaldison & John Burgess
1986	Aled Humphreys	Gary Evans	Keith Turner	Gary Evans	Steve Birchall & Chris Herbert
1987	Adrian Bradley	Gary Evans	Peter Freeman	Gary Evans	George Lockley & Geoff Wright
1988	Adrian Bradley	Gary Evans	Keith Ree	Keith Ree	George Lockley & Geoff Wright
1989	Adrian Bradley	Tim Price	Richard Peaster	Gary Evans	George Lockley & Geoff Wright
1990	Adrian Bradley	Brett Steele	Gary Evans	Gary Evans	Tony Bartlett & Chris Herbert
1991	David Bradley	Adrian Bradley	Allen Craig	Adrian Bradley	Martin Guilford & Michael Philip
1992	Gary Davies	Adrian Bradley	Allen Craig	Allen Craig	Gary Long & Neil Stubbington
1993	Jason Burrows	Tim Wheeler	Allen Craig	Allen Craig	Nick Round & Gary Burt
1994	Jason Burrows	Allen Craig	Paul Martin	Dan Wilkinson	Ian Osbaldison & Michael Stones
1995	James Cumber	Sean Grosvenor	Tim Wheeler	Richard Cuff	Ian Osbaldison & Michael Stones
1996	James Cumber	Richard Cuff	Tim Wheeler	Sean Grosvenor	Ian Osbaldison & Michael Stones
1997	James Cumber	Sean Grosvenor	Andrew Watkins	Barry Holley	Simon Bradford & Kev/Bill Bradford
1998	Gary Davies	Simon White	Andrew Watkins	Sean Grosvenor	David Smith & Stephen Smith
1999	Gary Davies	Richard Cuff	Barry Holley	Gary Davies	Craig Edwards & Marc Cooper
2000	Gary Davies	Richard Du’Feu	Barry Holley	James Cumber	
2001					John Grahame & Michael Stones
2002	Jonathan Slesser	Gary Davies	Simon Gower	Gary Davies	John Grahame & Michael Stones
2003	Jonathan Slesser	Gary Davies	Rick Du’Feu	Gary Davies	Simon Bradford & James Morrell/Simon Morgan
2004	Gary Davies		James Russell	Gary Davies	Simon Bradford & Simon Morgan
2005	Brad O’Leary		Simon Lane	Jason Rennie	Simon Bradford & Martin Taylor
2006	Brad O’Leary		Phil Mercer	Elliot Barrs	Simon Bradford & Simon Morgan
2007	Brad O’Leary		David Campbell	Phil Mercer	Simon Bradford & Nigel James
2008	Phil Mercer		David Campbell	Ben Saunders	Steven France & Lee Machin
2009	Lee Dunham		Ben Saunders	Ben Saunders	Edward Turner & Kristian Turner
2010	Lee Dunham		Ben Saunders	Ben Saunders	Tony Grahame & James Morrell
2011	Shane Holmes		Lee Dunham	Lee Dunham	Jamie Stevens & Neill Frary
2012	Jack Cox		Lee Payne	Lee Payne	Jamie Stevens & Neill Frary
2013	Jack Cox		Lee Dunham		Alan Peever & Tony Phillips
2014	Ben Saunders		Luke Mellows	Jack Cox	Simon Bradford & Luke Peters
2015	Luke Burton		Luke Dean	Richard Cannings	Jack Etheridge & Scott Grahame
2016	Josh Waterman		Luke Burton	Luke Burton	Tony Grahame & Harley Lloyd
2017	Ray Rowson		Luke Burton		Paul Pelling & Chris Pannell
2018	Luke Burton		Josh Waterman	Ryan Crowder	Paul Pelling & Chris Pannell
2019	Jamie Wainwright		Shane Carless	James Dodd	
2020	Jamie Wainwright		Luke Burton		
2021	Shane Carless		Ashley Greedy	James Dodd (MX1) / Shane Carless (MX2)---	
2022	Shane Carless		Luke Burton		Brian Turner & Ricky MacGough/Clarissa Turner
2023	Rory Jones		James Dodd		
2024	McKenzie Marshall		Ray Rowson		
2025	Henry Williams		James Dodd		
2026					

=== Automatic qualifiers ===
The top 30 finishers in the MX1 & MX2 Classes automatically qualify for the following year's Championship.

=== Qualifying rounds ===
Group qualifiers are usually run whilst the Championship is being run throughout the season. Area qualifiers are normally organised after the Championships have finished so as to include those riders who did not finish in the top 20 and wish to enter following years Championships. These riders are not eligible for the Superclass.

=== Superclass ===
The top 18 riders from the current Championships for MX1 & MX2 class will be eligible to compete in the Superclass. Riders in this class may ride any capacity machine as it is an unlimited c.c. class. Riders will not be allowed to ride elsewhere on the same day as a Superclass round. Riders who finished 19-20 in the Championships will be reserves.

=== Internationals ===
Since 1966 the AMCA has been a member of the IMBA (International Motocross Bond for Amateurs), which includes similar organisations in France, Denmark, Germany, Holland, Switzerland, Italy and the Czech Republic. Most of the countries compete in the 125cc, Open and Sidecar Championships. Most countries run a round (3 races) and all rounds count for the IMBA's European Moto Cross Championships. The AMCA do contribute towards travelling expenses to the meetings abroad and arrange the entries. In addition there are several non-Championship Internationals held during the year and riders selected by the AMCA may receive expenses from the organising club. Over the years many AMCA clubs have enjoyed events abroad, combining the event with holidays.

=== AMCA International Teams ===
These are selected from the AMCA's National Championship the previous year as most of the IMBA's European Championships commence in March and usually finish in September. Due to the events abroad plus the AMCA Championship rounds it is too difficult to have AMCA qualifying rounds in the same season, hence the need to qualify the previous season.
