= Matthew Zorn =

American attorney

- Other name: Matt Zorn
- Education: Emory University (BA, BS); Columbia University (JD)
- Occupation: Deputy General Counsel at the United States Department of Health and Human Services (HHS)
- Organization: Department of Health and Human Services (HHS)
- Known for: Legal work on cannabis and psychedelics

Matthew Zorn is an American attorney who does work in the area of cannabis and psychedelic law. As of 2025, he is employed by the United States Department of Health and Human Services (HHS) as a Deputy General Counsel. Prior to his federal employment, Zorn was an adjunct faculty member at University of Houston School of Law where he taught cannabis and psychedelic law, and was known for successfully pursuing Freedom of Information Act (FOIA) releases from regulatory agencies. Sources within the HHS have called him the agency's "psychedelics czar". Zorn wrote the Trump administration executive order on fast-tracking approval of psychedelics in April 2026.

== See also ==
- List of U.S. executive branch czars
- Legal status of psychedelic drugs in the United States
- Timeline of psychedelic legalization and decriminalization
- List of investigational hallucinogens and entactogens
