= 2020 local electoral calendar =

Worldwide local elections held in 2020

This local electoral calendar for 2020 lists the subnational elections held in 2020. Referendums, recall and retention elections, and national by-elections (special elections) are also included.

== January ==
- 5 January: Uzbekistan, Regional Councils, District Councils and City Councils (2nd round)
- 13 January: Bangladesh, Chittagong-8, House of the Nation by-election
- 17–18 January: India, Rajasthan, Village Councils (1st phase)
- 18 January: Malaysia, Kimanis, House of Representatives by-election
- 22 January: India, Telangana, Municipal Corporations and Municipal Councils
- 22–23 January: India, Rajasthan, Village Councils (2nd phase)
- 25 January: Nigeria, Agwara/Borgu and Abi/Yakurr constituencies, House of Representatives by-elections
- 26 January:
  - Austria
    - Burgenland, Parliament
    - Lower Austria, Municipal Councils
  - Italy
    - Calabria, Regional Council
    - Emilia-Romagna, Regional Council
- 28 January: India, Chhattisgarh, District Councils, Township Councils and Village Councils (1st phase)
- 29–30 January: India, Rajasthan, Village Councils (3rd phase)
- 30 January: Malawi, Lilongwe South, National Assembly by-election
- 31 January: India, Chhattisgarh, District Councils, Township Councils and Village Councils (2nd phase)

== February ==
- 1 February: Bangladesh
  - Dhaka North, Mayor and City Corporation
  - Dhaka South, Mayor and City Corporation
- 2 February:
  - Costa Rica, Cantonal Mayors, Cantonal Councils, District Heads, District Councils, Municipal-District Mayors and Municipal-District Councils
  - Germany, Leipzig, Lord Mayor (1st round)
  - Japan, Kyoto, Mayor
- 3 February: India, Chhattisgarh, District Councils, Township Councils and Village Councils (3rd phase)
- 7–8 February: Egypt, Giza 1st district and Minya Mallawi district, House of Representatives by-elections (voting abroad)
- 8 February: India, Delhi, Legislative Assembly
- 9 February:
  - Cameroon, Mayors and Municipal Councils
  - India, Karnataka, Municipal Councils and Town Councils
  - Switzerland
    - Aargau, referendum
    - Basel-Stadt, referendums
    - Bern, referendums
    - Fribourg, referendum
    - Geneva, referendums
    - Grisons, referendum
    - Neuchâtel, referendum
    - Schaffhausen, referendum
    - Solothurn, referendum
    - St. Gallen, referendum
    - Ticino, referendums
    - Zürich, referendums
- 11–12 February: Egypt, Giza 1st district and Minya Mallawi district, House of Representatives by-elections
- 13 February: Zambia, Chilubi, National Assembly by-election
- 16 February: Hungary, Fejér 4, National Assembly by-election
- 18 February: United States, Milwaukee, Mayor and Common Council (1st round)
- 23 February:
  - Comoros, Communal Councils
  - Germany, Hamburg, Parliament
  - Italy, Naples, Senate by-election
  - Thailand, Kamphaeng Phet constituency 2, House of Representatives by-election
- 29 February: Nigeria, Enugu, Local Government Councils and Chairmen

== March ==
- 1 March:
  - Germany, Leipzig, Lord Mayor (2nd round)
  - Italy, Rome, Chamber of Deputies by-election
  - Tajikistan, Regional Legislatures, City Legislatures and District Legislatures
- 2 March:
  - Guyana, Regional Democratic Councils
  - Jamaica, Clarendon South Eastern, House of Representatives by-election
- 3 March: United States
  - California's 25th congressional district, U.S. House of Representatives special election (1st round)
  - Alabama, Appointed Education Board constitutional referendum
  - Arkansas, Supreme Court and Court of Appeals (1st round)
  - Bakersfield, Mayor
  - Fresno, Mayor and City Council (1st round)
  - Long Beach, City Council (1st round)
  - Los Angeles County, Board of Supervisors (1st round)
    - Los Angeles, City Council (1st round)
  - Maine, Vaccination Exemptions Repeal referendum
  - Orange County, CA, Board of Supervisors (1st round)
  - Riverside County, Board of Supervisors
  - Sacramento, Mayor and City Council (1st round)
  - San Bernardino County, Board of Supervisors (1st round)
  - San Diego County, Board of Supervisors (1st round)
  - Santa Clara County, Board of Supervisors (1st round)
    - San Jose, City Council (1st round)
- 8 March:
  - Italy, Terni, Senate by-election
  - Switzerland
    - St. Gallen, Government (1st round) and Cantonal Council
    - Uri, Executive Council and Landrat
- 14 March: Nigeria, Magama/Rijau constituency, ~~House of Representatives by-election~~ (nullified)
- 15 March:
  - Dominican Republic, Mayors and District Councils
  - France
    - Municipal Councils (1st round)
    - Lyon Metropolis, Council (1st round)
    - Marseille, Municipal Council (1st round)
    - Paris, Council (1st round)
    - French Polynesia, Municipal Councils (1st round)
    - New Caledonia, Municipal Councils (1st round)
    - Saint Pierre and Miquelon, Municipal Council
  - Germany, Bavaria, District Presidents, District Councils, Mayors and Municipal Councils (1st round)
    - Munich, Lord Mayor (1st round), City Council and Borough Councils
    - Nuremberg, Mayor (1st round) and City Council
  - Switzerland
    - Appenzell Ausserrhoden, Municipal Councils (1st round)
    - Geneva, Municipal Councils (1st round)
    - Thurgau, Executive Council and Grand Council
- 21 March: Bangladesh, Bagerhat-4, Dhaka-10 and Gaibandha-3, House of the Nation by-elections
- 22 March:
  - Japan, Kumamoto, Governor
  - Switzerland, Schwyz, Executive Council (1st round) and Cantonal Council
- 28 March: Australia, Queensland, Mayors, Regional Councils, City Councils, Aboriginal Shire Councils and Shire Councils
  - Brisbane, Lord Mayor and City Council
- 29 March: Germany, Bavaria, District Presidents and Mayors (2nd round)
  - Munich, Lord Mayor (2nd round)
  - Nuremberg, Mayor (2nd round)

== April ==
- 4–18 April: Papua New Guinea, Menyamya, National Parliament by-election
- 5 April: Switzerland, Geneva, Municipal Councils (2nd round)
- 7 April: United States
  - Anchorage, Assembly
  - Wisconsin, Supreme Court and Court of Appeals
    - Milwaukee, Mayor and Common Council (2nd round)
- 12 April: Kyrgyzstan, City Councils and Village Councils
- 19 April: Switzerland, St. Gallen, Government (2nd round)
- 26 April:
  - Japan, Shizuoka 4th district, House of Representatives by-election
  - Switzerland, Appenzell Ausserrhoden, Municipal Councils (2nd round)
- 28 April: United States, Maryland's 7th congressional district, U.S. House of Representatives special election

== May ==
- 12 May: United States
  - California's 25th congressional district, U.S. House of Representatives special election (2nd round)
  - Wisconsin's 7th congressional district, U.S. House of Representatives special election
- 17 May:
  - Benin, Communal Councils, Municipal Councils and District/Village Councils
  - Switzerland, Schwyz, Executive Council (2nd round)
- 19 May: United States, Portland, Mayor and City Commission (1st round)
- 20 May: Burundi, Communal Councils
- 25 May: Suriname, District Councils and Local Councils
- 30 May: Nigeria
  - Benue, Local Government Councils and Chairmen
  - Cross River, Local Government Councils and Chairmen

== June ==
- 2 June: United States, Idaho, Supreme Court and Court of Appeals
- 5–6 June: Czech Republic, Teplice, Senate by-election (1st round)
- 6 June: Taiwan, Kaohsiung, Mayor recall election
- 7 June: Japan, Okinawa, Prefectural Assembly
- 9 June: United States
  - Georgia, Supreme Court and Court of Appeals
  - West Virginia, Supreme Court of Appeals
- 12–13 June: Czech Republic, Teplice, Senate by-election (2nd round)
- 20 June: Thailand, Lampang constituency 4, House of Representatives by-election
- 21 June: Serbia
  - Municipal Assemblies
  - Vojvodina, Assembly
- 23 June: United States, New York's 27th congressional district, U.S. House of Representatives special election
- 28 June:
  - Austria, Styria, Municipal Councils
  - France
    - Municipal Councils (2nd round)
    - Lyon Metropolis, Council (2nd round)
    - Marseille, Municipal Council (2nd round)
    - Paris, Council (2nd round)
    - French Polynesia, Municipal Councils (2nd round)
    - New Caledonia, Municipal Councils (2nd round)
- 30 June:
  - Nigeria, Taraba, Local Government Councils and Chairmen
  - United States, Oklahoma, Medicaid Expansion constitutional referendum

== July ==
- 4 July: Australia, Eden-Monaro, House of Representatives by-election
- 5 July: Japan, Tokyo, Governor
- 12 July:
  - Japan, Kagoshima, Governor
  - Spain
    - Basque Country, Parliament
    - Galicia, Parliament
- 14 July: Bangladesh, Bogra-1 and Jessore-6, House of the Nation by-elections
- 20 July: Nigeria, Ondo, Local Government Councils and Chairmen

== August ==
- 1 August: Australia, Tasmania, (Huon and Rosevears) Legislative Council
- 4 August: United States
  - Mesa, Mayor and City Council
  - Missouri, Medicaid Expansion constitutional referendum
- 6 August: United States, Tennessee, Court of Appeals retention election
- 8 August: United States, Honolulu, Mayor and City Council (1st round)
- 9 August: Thailand, Samut Prakan constituency 5, House of Representatives by-election
- 12 August – 1 September: Autonomous Region of Bougainville, President and House of Representatives
- 15 August: Taiwan, Kaohsiung, Mayor by-election
- 18 August:
  - Libya, Ghat, Municipal Council
  - United States, Miami-Dade County, Mayor and County Commission (1st round)
- 22 August: Australia, Northern Territory, Legislative Assembly
- 23 August: Switzerland, Appenzell Innerrhoden, extraordinary ballot (1st round)
- 24 August: Burundi, Mayors and Hill Councils
- 25 August: United States, Tulsa, Mayor and City Council (1st round)
- 26–29 August: Latvia, Riga, City Council
- 27 August:
  - India, Mizoram, Village Councils and Local Councils
  - Isle of Man, Douglas South (2 seats), House of Keys by-elections
- 28 August: Samoa, Gagaʻifomauga No. 3, Legislative Assembly by-election
- 29 August: Nigeria, Ebonyi, Local Government Councils and Chairmen
- 30 August:
  - Montenegro, Municipal Assemblies
  - Switzerland, Schaffhausen, Executive Council and referendums

== September ==
- 3 September: Libya, Misrata, Municipal Council
- 9 September: Ethiopia, Tigray, State Council, City Councils, District Councils and Neighborhood Councils
- 11–13 September: Russia, State Duma by-elections, Federal Subject Heads, Federal Subject Legislatures, Municipal Heads, Municipal Councils, District Councils, Village Councils and Local referendums
  - Arkhangelsk Oblast, Governor
  - Belgorod Oblast, Duma
  - Bryansk Oblast, Governor
  - Chelyabinsk Oblast, Legislative Assembly
  - Chuvashia, Head
  - Irkutsk Oblast, Governor
  - Jewish Autonomous Oblast, Governor
  - Kaluga Oblast, Governor and Legislative Assembly
  - Kamchatka Krai, Governor
  - Komi Republic, Head special election and State Council
  - Kostroma Oblast, Governor and Duma
  - Krasnodar Krai, Head of Administration (Governor)
  - Kurgan Oblast, Duma
  - Kursk Oblast, District 110, State Duma by-election
  - Leningrad Oblast, Governor
  - Magadan Oblast, Duma
  - Novosibirsk Oblast, Legislative Assembly
    - Novosibirsk, Council of Deputies
  - Penza Oblast, District 147, State Duma by-election and Governor
  - Perm Krai, Governor special election
  - Rostov Oblast, Governor
  - Ryazan Oblast, Duma
  - Sevastopol, Governor special election
  - Smolensk Oblast, Governor
  - Tambov Oblast, Head of Administration
  - Tatarstan, District 28, State Duma by-election and President
  - Voronezh Oblast, Duma
  - Yamalo-Nenets Autonomous Okrug, Legislative Assembly
  - Yaroslavl Oblast, District 194, State Duma by-election
- 13 September:
  - Austria, Vorarlberg, Mayors (1st round) and Municipal Councils
  - Germany, North Rhine-Westphalia, District Administrators, District Councils, Mayors and Municipal Councils (1st round)
    - Cologne, Lord Mayor (1st round), City Council and Borough Councils
    - Düsseldorf, Lord Mayor (1st round), City Council and Borough Councils
    - Ruhr, Parliament
      - Dortmund, Lord Mayor (1st round), City Council and Borough Councils
      - Duisburg, City Council and Borough Councils
      - Essen, Lord Mayor, City Council and Borough Councils
- 14 September: Canada, New Brunswick, Legislative Assembly
- 17 September: Zambia, Lukashya and Mwansabombwe, National Assembly by-elections
- 19 September: Nigeria, Edo, Governor
- 20 September: France
  - Haut-Rhin's 1st constituency, National Assembly by-election (1st round)
  - Maine-et-Loire's 3rd constituency, National Assembly by-election (1st round)
  - Réunion's 2nd constituency, National Assembly by-election (1st round)
  - Seine-Maritime's 5th constituency, National Assembly by-election (1st round)
  - Val-de-Marne's 9th constituency, National Assembly by-election (1st round)
  - Yvelines's 11th constituency, National Assembly by-election (1st round)
- 20–21 September: Italy
  - Sassari, Senate by-election
  - Villafranca di Verona, Senate by-election
  - Aosta Valley, Regional Council
  - Apulia, Regional Council
  - Campania, Regional Council
  - Liguria, Regional Council
  - Marche, Regional Council
  - Tuscany, Regional Council
  - Veneto, Regional Council
  - Mayors and Municipal Councils (1st round)
- 22 September: Papua New Guinea, Goroka, National Parliament by-election
- 26 September:
  - Bangladesh, Pabna-4, House of the Nation by-election
  - Malaysia, Sabah, Legislative Assembly
- 27 September:
  - Austria, Vorarlberg, Mayors (2nd round)
  - France
    - Haut-Rhin's 1st constituency, National Assembly by-election (2nd round)
    - Maine-et-Loire's 3rd constituency, National Assembly by-election (2nd round)
    - Réunion's 2nd constituency, National Assembly by-election (2nd round)
    - Seine-Maritime's 5th constituency, National Assembly by-election (2nd round)
    - Val-de-Marne's 9th constituency, National Assembly by-election (2nd round)
    - Yvelines's 11th constituency, National Assembly by-election (2nd round)
  - Germany, North Rhine-Westphalia, District Administrators and Mayors (2nd round)
    - Cologne, Lord Mayor (2nd round)
    - Dortmund, Lord Mayor (2nd round)
    - Düsseldorf, Lord Mayor (2nd round)
  - Romania, County Presidents, County Councils, Mayors, Local Councils, Sector Mayors and Sector Councils
  - Switzerland
    - Aargau, referendums
    - Appenzell Ausserrhoden, referendums
    - Appenzell Innerrhoden, extraordinary ballot (2nd round)
    - Basel-Landschaft, referendum
    - Geneva, referendums
    - Lucerne, referendum
    - Nidwalden, referendum
    - Schaffhausen, Cantonal Council
    - Schwyz, referendum
    - Solothurn, referendums
    - Thurgau, referendum
    - Uri, referendums
    - Zürich, referendums
  - Uruguay, Departmental Mayors, Departmental Councils, Municipal Mayors and Municipal Councils
- 28–29 September: India, Rajasthan, Village Councils (4th phase)
- 29 September: United States, Georgia's 5th congressional district, U.S. House of Representatives special election (1st round)

== October ==
- 2–3 October: Czech Republic, Regional Assemblies
- 3–4 October: India, Rajasthan, Village Councils (5th phase)
- 4–5 October: Italy, Mayors and Municipal Councils (2nd round)
  - Sicily, Mayors and Municipal Councils (1st round)
- 6 October: Canada, Nunatsiavut, President
- 6–7 October: India, Rajasthan, Village Councils (6th phase)
- 10 October: Nigeria, Ondo, Governor
- 10–11 October: India, Rajasthan, Village Councils (7th phase)
- 11 October:
  - Austria, Vienna, Parliament
  - Hungary, Borsod-Abaúj-Zemplén 6, National Assembly by-election
- 15 October:
  - Libya, Municipal Councils
  - Mongolia, Provincial Assemblies, District Assemblies and Subdistrict Assemblies
    - Ulaanbaatar, City Council
- 16 October: India, Ladakh, Leh District, Ladakh Autonomous Hill Development Council
- 17 October:
  - Australia, Australian Capital Territory, Legislative Assembly
  - Bangladesh, Dhaka-5 and Naogaon-6, House of the Nation by-elections
  - Canada, Nova Scotia, Mayors, Cape Breton Regional Council and Municipal Councils
    - Halifax, Mayor, Regional Council and School Boards
  - Nigeria, Bauchi, Local Government Councils and Chairmen
- 18 October:
  - Mexico, State elections
    - Coahuila, Congress
    - Hidalgo, Mayors and Municipal Councils
  - Switzerland
    - Aargau, Executive Council and Grand Council
    - Jura, Government (1st round) and Parliament
- 18–19 October: Italy, Sicily, Mayors and Municipal Councils (2nd round)
- 21 October: Netherlands, Sint Eustatius, Island Council
- 24 October:
  - Australia, Victoria, Mayors, City Councils, Shire Councils and Borough Council
    - City of Melbourne, Lord Mayor and City Council
  - Canada, British Columbia, Legislative Assembly
- 25 October:
  - Cape Verde, Municipal Chambers and Municipal Assemblies
  - Japan
    - Okayama, Governor
    - Toyama, Governor
  - Portugal, Azores, Legislative Assembly
  - Switzerland, Basel-Stadt, Executive Council (1st round) and Grand Council
  - Tanzania, Zanzibar, President, House of Representatives, District Councils, Town Councils and Municipal Council
  - Ukraine, City Mayors, Town Mayors, Village Mayors, Oblast Councils, Raion Councils, City Councils, Urban-District Councils, Town Councils and Village Councils (1st round)
- 25–26 October: Italy, Sardinia, Mayors and Municipal Councils (1st round)
- 26 October: Canada
  - Toronto Centre, House of Commons by-election
  - York Centre, House of Commons by-election
  - Saskatchewan, Legislative Assembly
- 28 October: India, Bihar, Legislative Assembly (1st phase)
- 29 October: India, Rajasthan, Jaipur, Jodhpur and Kota, Municipal Corporations (1st phase)
- 31 October:
  - Australia, Queensland, Legislative Assembly
  - Georgia, Adjara, Supreme Council
  - Nigeria
    - Bayelsa Central, Cross River North, Imo North and Lagos East, Senate by-elections
    - Akwa Ibom, Local Government Councils and Chairmen

== November ==
- 1 November:
  - India, Rajasthan, Jaipur, Jodhpur and Kota, Municipal Corporations (2nd phase)
  - Japan, Osaka City, Metropolis Plan referendum
- 3 November:
  - Guam, Mayors and Vice Mayors
  - India, Bihar, Legislative Assembly (2nd phase)
  - Northern Mariana Islands, Municipal Councils and Boards of Education
  - Puerto Rico, Mayors and Municipal Legislatures
    - San Juan, Mayor
  - United States, Quadrennial elections
    - Arizona, U.S. Senate special election
    - Georgia, U.S. Senate special election (1st round)
    - Washington, D.C., Council
    - Alabama
      - Board of Education and Public Service Commission
      - Supreme Court, Court of Civil Appeals and Court of Criminal Appeals
      - Only Citizens Can Vote constitutional referendum
    - Alaska
      - House of Representatives and Senate
      - Supreme Court and Court of Appeals retention elections
      - Open Primary System and Ranked-Choice Voting referendum
    - Arizona
      - Corporation Commission
      - House of Representatives and Senate
      - Supreme Court and Court of Appeals retention elections
      - Legalize Cannabis referendum
      - Maricopa County, Board of Supervisors
        - Phoenix, Mayor and City Council (1st round)
    - Arkansas
      - House of Representatives and Senate
      - Supreme Court and Court of Appeals (2nd round)
      - Initiative Process and Legislative Referral Requirements, and Legislative Term Limits constitutional referendums
    - California
      - Assembly and Senate
      - Affirmative Action, Exempt App-Based Drivers from Employee Benefits, Felony Parolee Voting Rights, Limited Voting Rights for 17-Year-Olds, Rent Control and Replace Cash Bail with Risk Assessments referendums
      - Bakersfield, City Council
      - Fresno, City Council (2nd round)
      - Long Beach, City Council (2nd round)
      - Los Angeles County, Board of Supervisors (2nd round)
        - Los Angeles, City Council (2nd round)
      - Oakland, City Council
      - Orange County, Board of Supervisors (2nd round)
      - Sacramento, City Council (2nd round)
      - San Bernardino County, Board of Supervisors (2nd round)
      - San Diego County, Board of Supervisors (2nd round)
        - San Diego, Mayor, City Attorney and City Council
      - San Francisco, Board of Supervisors
      - Santa Clara County, Board of Supervisors (2nd round)
        - San Jose, City Council (2nd round)
    - Colorado
      - Board of Education
      - House of Representatives and Senate
      - Supreme Court and Court of Appeals retention elections
      - Only Citizens Can Vote constitutional referendum, and Abortion Ban, National Popular Vote and Paid Medical and Family Leave referendums
    - Connecticut
      - House of Representatives and Senate
    - Delaware
      - Governor, Lieutenant Governor and Insurance Commissioner
      - House of Representatives and Senate
    - Florida
      - House of Representatives and Senate
      - Supreme Court and District Courts of Appeal retention elections
      - Amendments Must Pass Twice, Minimum Wage, Only Citizens Can Vote and Top-Two Open Primaries constitutional referendums
      - Broward County, Commission
      - Miami-Dade County, Mayor and County Commission (2nd round)
    - Georgia
      - Public Service Commission (1st round)
      - House of Representatives and Senate
    - Hawaii
      - Office of Hawaiian Affairs Board of Trustees
      - House of Representatives and Senate
      - Honolulu, Mayor and City Council (2nd round)
    - Idaho
      - House of Representatives and Senate
    - Illinois
      - House of Representatives and Senate
      - Supreme Court and Appellate Court retention elections, and Supreme Court and Appellate Court
      - Graduated Income Tax constitutional referendum
      - Cook County, Board of Review, Clerk of the Circuit Court, State's Attorney and Water Reclamation District Board
    - Indiana
      - Governor and Attorney General
      - House of Representatives and Senate
      - Supreme Court and Court of Appeals retention elections
    - Iowa
      - House of Representatives and Senate
      - Supreme Court and Court of Appeals retention elections
      - Constitutional Convention referendum
    - Kansas
      - Board of Education
      - House of Representatives and Senate
      - Supreme Court and Court of Appeals retention elections
    - Kentucky
      - House of Representatives and Senate
      - Supreme Court
      - Louisville, Metropolitan Council
    - Louisiana
      - Public Service Commission (1st round)
      - Supreme Court and Circuit Courts of Appeal (1st round)
      - Abortion constitutional referendum
    - Maine
      - House of Representatives and Senate
    - Maryland
      - Court of Appeals and Court of Special Appeals retention elections
      - Baltimore, Mayor and City Council
    - Massachusetts
      - Governor's Council
      - House of Representatives and Senate
      - Ranked-Choice Voting referendum
    - Michigan
      - Board of Education
      - House of Representatives
      - Supreme Court and Court of Appeals
      - Search Warrant for Electronic Data constitutional referendum
      - Wayne County, Commission
    - Minnesota
      - House of Representatives and Senate
      - Supreme Court and Court of Appeals
    - Mississippi
      - Supreme Court
      - Elimination of State Electoral College and Medical Cannabis constitutional referendums, and State Flag referendum
    - Missouri
      - Governor, Lieutenant Governor, Attorney General, Secretary of State and Treasurer
      - House of Representatives and Senate
      - Supreme Court and Court of Appeals retention elections
      - Executive Term Limits and Redistricting and Lobbying constitutional referendums
    - Montana
      - Governor, Attorney General, Auditor, Public Service Commission, Secretary of State and Superintendent of Public Instruction
      - House of Representatives and Senate
      - Supreme Court
      - Legalize Cannabis and Remove Local Authority to Regulate Firearms referendums
    - Nebraska
      - Board of Education and Public Service Commission
      - Legislature
      - Supreme Court and Court of Appeals retention elections
    - Nevada
      - Assembly and Senate
      - Supreme Court and Court of Appeals
      - Marriage Regardless of Gender, Renewable Energy Standards, State Board of Pardons Commissioners, Status of Board of Regents and Voting Rights constitutional referendums
      - Clark County, Commission
    - New Hampshire
      - Governor and Executive Council
      - House of Representatives and Senate
    - New Jersey
      - Delayed Redistricting and Legalize Cannabis constitutional referendums
    - New Mexico
      - Public Education Commission and Public Regulation Commission
      - House of Representatives and Senate
      - Supreme Court retention election, and Supreme Court and Court of Appeals
      - Appointed Public Regulation Commission constitutional referendum
    - New York
      - Assembly and Senate
    - North Carolina
      - Governor, Lieutenant Governor, Agriculture Commissioner, Attorney General, Auditor, Insurance Commissioner, Labor Commissioner, Secretary of State, Superintendent of Public Instruction and Treasurer
      - House of Representatives and Senate
      - Supreme Court and Court of Appeals
    - North Dakota
      - Governor, Auditor, Insurance Commissioner, Public Service Commission, Superintendent of Public Instruction and Treasurer
      - House of Representatives and Senate
      - Supreme Court
      - Double Election or Legislative Approval constitutional referendum
    - Ohio
      - Board of Education
      - House of Representatives and Senate
      - Supreme Court and Court of Appeals
    - Oklahoma
      - Corporation Commission
      - House of Representatives and Senate
      - Supreme Court, Court of Civil Appeals and Court of Criminal Appeals retention elections
      - Criminal History in Sentencing constitutional referendum
      - Tulsa, City Council (2nd round)
    - Oregon
      - Attorney General, Secretary of State and Treasurer
      - House of Representatives and Senate
      - Supreme Court and Court of Appeals
      - Campaign Finance Limits constitutional referendum, and Drug Decriminalization and Legalize Psilocybin referendums
      - Portland, Mayor and City Commission (2nd round)
    - Pennsylvania
      - Attorney General, Auditor and Treasurer
      - House of Representatives and Senate
    - Rhode Island
      - House of Representatives and Senate
      - Change State Name constitutional referendum
    - South Carolina
      - House of Representatives and Senate
    - South Dakota
      - Public Utilities Commission
      - House of Representatives and Senate
      - Supreme Court retention election
      - Legalize Cannabis constitutional referendum and Medical Cannabis referendum
    - Tennessee
      - House of Representatives and Senate
    - Texas
      - Board of Education and Railroad Commissioner
      - House of Representatives and Senate
      - Supreme Court, Court of Criminal Appeals and Courts of Appeals
      - Arlington, City Council
      - Austin, City Council (1st round)
      - Bexar County, Commissioners Court
      - Dallas County, Commissioners Court
      - El Paso, Mayor and City Council (1st round)
      - Harris County, Commissioners Court
      - Tarrant County, Commissioners Court
    - Utah
      - Governor, Attorney General, Auditor, Board of Education and Treasurer
      - House of Representatives and Senate
      - Supreme Court and Court of Appeals retention elections
      - Gender-Neutral Constitutional Language and Remove Slavery as Punishment constitutional referendums
    - Vermont
      - Governor, Lieutenant Governor, Attorney General, Auditor, Secretary of State and Treasurer
      - House of Representatives and Senate
    - Virginia
      - Redistricting Commission constitutional referendum
      - Virginia Beach, Mayor and City Council
    - Washington
      - Governor, Lieutenant Governor, Attorney General, Auditor, Insurance Commissioner, Public Lands Commissioner, Secretary of State, Superintendent of Public Instruction and Treasurer
      - House of Representatives and Senate
      - Supreme Court and Court of Appeals
    - West Virginia
      - Governor, Agriculture Commissioner, Attorney General, Auditor, Secretary of State and Treasurer
      - House of Delegates and Senate
    - Wisconsin
      - Assembly and Senate
    - Wyoming
      - House of Representatives and Senate
      - Supreme Court retention elections
    - American Samoa, Governor and House of Representatives
    - Guam, Auditor, Consolidated Commission on Utilities, Education Board, Legislature, and Supreme Court and Superior Court retention elections
    - Northern Mariana Islands, House of Representatives, Senate, and Supreme Court retention elections
    - Puerto Rico, Governor, House of Representatives, Senate and Referendum
    - U.S. Virgin Islands, Board of Education, Board of Elections, Legislature and Referendum
- 7 November:
  - The Gambia, Niamina West, National Assembly by-election
  - India
    - Valmiki Nagar, House of the People by-election
    - Bihar, Legislative Assembly (3rd phase)
- 8 November:
  - Germany, Stuttgart, Lord Mayor (1st round)
  - Myanmar, State and Regional Hluttaws and Ethnic Affairs Ministers
  - Switzerland, Jura, Government (2nd round)
- 8–9 November: Italy, Sardinia, Mayors and Municipal Councils (2nd round)
- 9 November: Canada, Saskatchewan, Mayors and Municipal Councils
- 10 November: India, Rajasthan, Jaipur, Jodhpur and Kota, Mayors
- 11 November: Barbados, St. George North, House of Assembly by-election
- 12 November: Bangladesh, Dhaka-18 and Sirajganj-1, House of the Nation by-elections
- 14 November: Guernsey, Alderney, President
- 15 November:
  - Bosnia and Herzegovina
    - Brčko District, Assembly
    - Federation of Bosnia and Herzegovina, Mayors and Municipal Councils
    - Republika Srpska, Mayors and Municipal Assemblies
  - Brazil
    - Mato Grosso, Federal Senate by-election
    - Mayors and Municipal Councils (1st round)
      - Rio de Janeiro, Mayor (1st round)
      - São Paulo, Mayor (1st round)
  - Japan, Tochigi, Governor
  - Pakistan, Gilgit-Baltistan, Legislative Assembly
  - Ukraine, City Mayors, Town Mayors, Village Mayors, Oblast Councils, Raion Councils, City Councils, Urban-District Councils, Town Councils and Village Councils (2nd round)
- 19 November: Bhutan, Bumthang, Chhoekhor Tang, National Assembly by-election
- 22 November:
  - Mauritius, Village Councils
  - Ukraine, City Mayors (2nd round)
- 23 November: India, Rajasthan, District Councils and Township Councils (1st phase)
- 25 November: Namibia, Regional Councils and Local Councils
- 27 November: India, Rajasthan, District Councils and Township Councils (2nd phase)
- 28 November:
  - Australia, Groom, House of Representatives by-election
  - Guernsey, Alderney, Parliament
  - India, Jammu and Kashmir, Municipal Corporation, Municipal Councils, Block Development Councils and Village Councils by-elections and District Development Councils (1st phase)
  - Nigeria, Borno, Local Government Councils and Chairmen
- 29 November:
  - Brazil, Mayors and Municipal Councils (2nd round)
    - Rio de Janeiro, Mayor (2nd round)
    - São Paulo, Mayor (2nd round)
  - Germany, Stuttgart, Lord Mayor (2nd round)
  - Switzerland
    - Aargau, referendum
    - Basel-Landschaft, referendum
    - Basel-Stadt, Executive Council (2nd round) and referendums
    - Fribourg, referendum
    - Geneva, referendums
    - Lucerne, referendum
    - Schwyz, referendum
    - St. Gallen, referendums
    - Uri, referendum
  - Transnistria, District Chairs, District Councils, Mayors and Municipal Councils
  - Ukraine, Chernivtsi, Mayor (2nd round)

== December ==
- 1 December:
  - India
    - Jammu and Kashmir, Municipal Corporation, Municipal Councils, Block Development Councils and Village Councils by-elections and District Development Councils (2nd phase)
    - Rajasthan, District Councils and Township Councils (3rd phase)
    - Telangana, Hyderabad Metropolitan Region, Greater Hyderabad Municipal Corporation
  - United States, Georgia's 5th congressional district, U.S. House of Representatives special election (2nd round)
- 4 December: India
  - Jammu and Kashmir, Municipal Corporation, Municipal Councils, Block Development Councils and Village Councils by-elections and District Development Councils (3rd phase)
  - Mizoram, Lai Autonomous District, Council
- 5 December:
  - India, Rajasthan, District Councils and Township Councils (4th phase)
  - Malaysia, Batu Sapi, House of Representatives by-election
  - United States, Louisiana
    - Louisiana's 5th congressional district, U.S. House of Representatives (2nd round)
    - Public Service Commission and Circuit Courts of Appeal (2nd round)
- 6 December: Ukraine, Kryvyi Rih, Mayor (2nd round)
- 7 December: India
  - Assam, Bodoland, Territorial Council (1st phase)
  - Jammu and Kashmir, Municipal Corporation, Municipal Councils, Block Development Councils and Village Councils by-elections and District Development Councils (4th phase)
- 8 December
  - India, Kerala, Municipal Corporations, Municipal Councils, District Councils, Township Councils and Village Councils (1st phase)
  - Liberia, Montserrado-9 and Sinoe-2, House of Representatives by-elections
- 9 December: Indonesia, Governors, Regents and Mayors
- 10 December: India
  - Assam, Bodoland, Territorial Council (2nd phase)
  - Jammu and Kashmir, Municipal Corporation, Municipal Councils, Block Development Councils and Village Councils by-elections and District Development Councils (5th phase)
  - Kerala, Municipal Corporations, Municipal Councils, District Councils, Township Councils and Village Councils (2nd phase)
- 12 December:
  - India, Goa, District Councils
  - Nigeria, Kogi, Local Government Councils and Chairmen
  - United States
    - El Paso, Mayor and City Council (2nd round)
    - Houston, City Council (2nd round)
- 13 December:
  - India
    - Jammu and Kashmir, Municipal Corporation, Municipal Councils, Block Development Councils and Village Councils by-elections and District Development Councils (6th phase)
    - Rajasthan, Municipal Councils and Town Councils
  - Niger, Regional Councils and Municipal Councils
- 14 December: India, Kerala, Municipal Corporations, Municipal Councils, District Councils, Township Councils and Village Councils (3rd phase)
- 15 December:
  - Kenya, Msambweni, National Assembly by-election
  - United States, Austin, City Council (2nd round)
- 16 December:
  - Guernsey, Sark, Parliament
  - India, Jammu and Kashmir, Municipal Corporation, Municipal Councils, Block Development Councils and Village Councils by-elections and District Development Councils (7th phase)
- 17 December: India, Assam, Kamrup District, Morigaon District and Nagaon District, Tiwa Autonomous Council
- 18 December: Nigeria, Abia, Local Government Councils and Chairmen
- 19 December:
  - India, Jammu and Kashmir, Municipal Corporation, Municipal Councils, Block Development Councils and Village Councils by-elections and District Development Councils (8th phase)
  - Nigeria, Gombe, Local Government Councils and Chairmen
- 20 December: Thailand, Provincial Administrative Organizations
- 21 December: Libya, Municipal Councils
- 22 December: India
  - Arunachal Pradesh, Municipal Corporation, Municipal Councils, District Councils and Village Councils
  - Karnataka, Village Councils (1st phase)
- 27 December: India, Karnataka, Village Councils (2nd phase)
- 28 December: Bangladesh, Mayors and Municipal Councils (1st phase)

== See also ==
- 2020 United States ballot measures
