= 2020 Teplice by-election =

Czech Senate by-election

2020 Czech senate by-election
- 5–6 June 2020; 12-13 June 2020
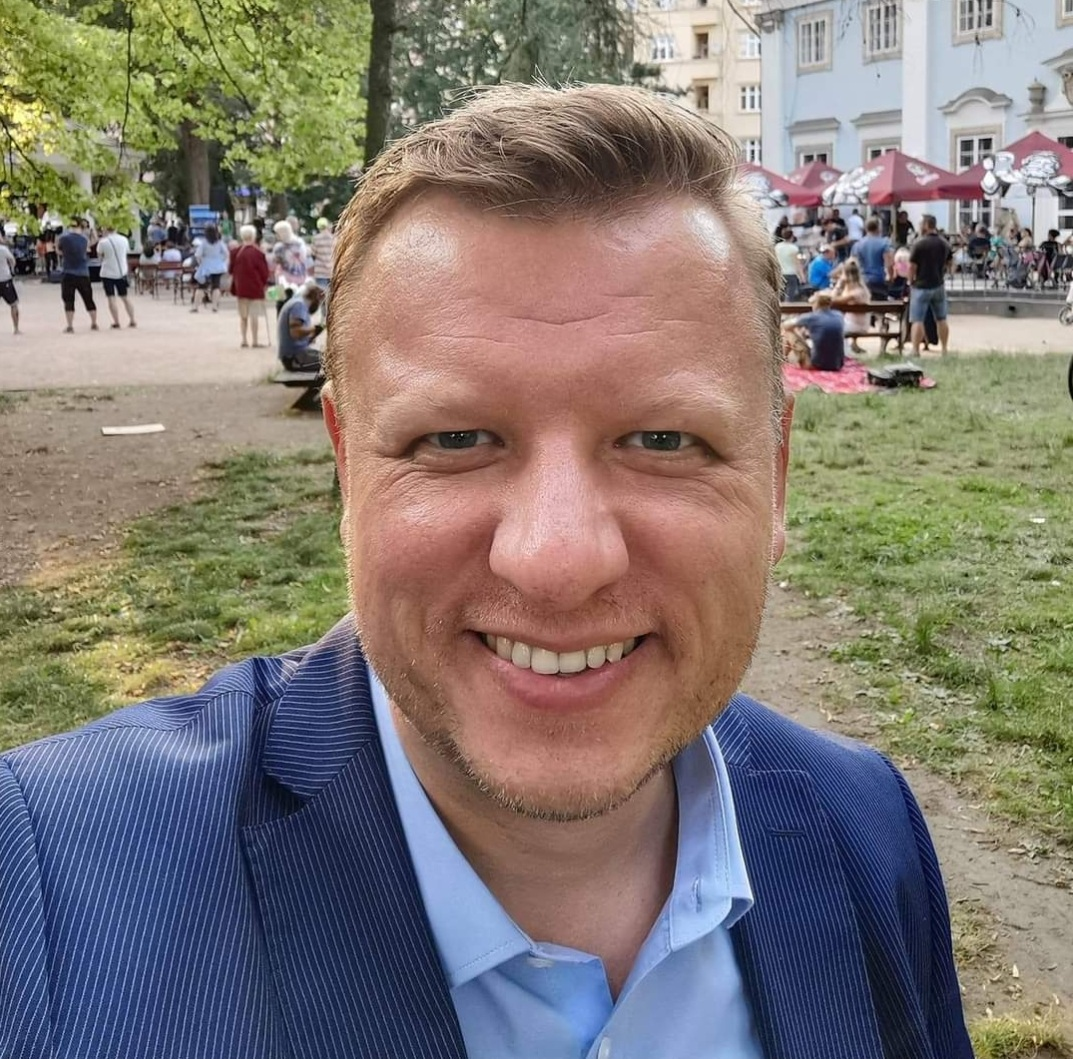

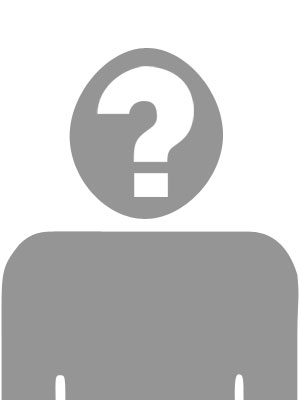
	First party	Second party
Candidate	Hynek Hanza	Zdeněk Bergman
Party	ODS	SEN 21
Popular vote	5,302	3,972
Percentage	57.2%	42.8%

A by-election for the Teplice Senate seat in the Czech Republic was held in 2020, following the death of Jaroslav Kubera. The election, originally scheduled for 27 and 28 March 2020, was cancelled due to the COVID-19 pandemic in the Czech Republic. The first round was eventually held on 5 and 6 June 2020. Hynek Hanza received the highest number of votes and advanced to a runoff, in which he defeated Zdeněk Bergman and became the new Senator.

== Background ==
Jaroslav Kubera served as a Senator of the Senate of the Parliament of the Czech Republic from 2000, representing the ODS. He won his last Senate election in 2018, following which he was elected the President of the Senate of the Czech Republic. His seat became vacant on 20 January 2020 upon his death. The by-election for the seat was due to be held no later than 90 days following his death. The date for the first round of the by-election was set for 27 and 28 March 2020.

Talks about potential candidates started after Kubera's burial on 3 February 2020. It was reported that Tomáš Tožička and Zdeněk Bergman would compete for the Pirate Party nomination. The ODS offered nomination to Mayor of Teplice, Hynek Hanza. Hanza didn't confirm his candidacy, stating that he had to consider if he could be a Senator and Mayor at the same Time. Governor of Ústí region Oldřich Bubeníček expressed his intention to run as a Communist candidate.

On 5 February 2020 Mayor of Bílina Zuzana Schwarz Bařtipánová announced her candidacy as the nominee of ANO 2011.

Voting on the Pirate nomination was held on 7 February 2020. Tomáš Tožička defeated Zdeněk Bergman receiving 26 votes against Bergman's 6 votes. Tožička was previously noted for his views close to the far-left and his statement that "capitalism and right wing politics are just crimes against humanity" and "Joseph Stalin was an amateur in comparison with them." Oldřich Bubeniček officially announced his candidacy on the same day.

On 7 February 2020, Zbyněk Šimbera, Mayor of Duchcov, was announced as the nominee of the Czech Social Democratic Party and Bohumil Ježek was announced as the nominee of Freedom and Direct Democracy. TOP 09 announced it wouldn't stand its candidate. Hynek Hanza and Zdeněk Bergman were reported to be considering candidacy. On 8 February 2020 Zdeněk Pešek announced his candidacy as a candidate of Tricolour Citizens' Movement.

Nominations were closed on 10 February 2020 with 11 nominated candidates. Hynek Hanza announced his candidacy as the nominee of the Civic Democratic Party. Hanza stated that he wanted to continue in Kubera's work. Hanza stated that it was hard for him to accept the nomination, as Kubera was his political teacher and personal friend. Kubera's main rival from 2018 Senate election Bergman also announced his candidacy as the nominee of Senator 21 with support from TOP 09.

On 23 February 2020 KDU-ČSL endorsed Hanza for the position of the Senator stating it believed he would be a dignified and successful Senator. On 27 February 2020 the names of 10 candidates were announced. The candidacy of Jan Vondrouš was rejected as his nomination was made by an unauthorised person.

Tožička's past statements on social networks led to a vote in the Czech Pirate Party about withdrawing his nomination. Voting finished with 249 members supporting Tožička while 232 members backed withdrawing his nomination. Tožička thus remained party's nominee when voting concluded on 18 February 2020. Another controversy started when it was published that Tožička criticised Israel's operation military in Gaza in 2008 calling Israel a fascist state and drawing a swastika in the Star of David. The leadership of the Pirate Party called Tožička to withdraw from election on 2 March 2020. Ústí nad Labem regional organisation of Pirates backed up Tožička, announcing on 3 March 2020 that it supported Tožička's candidacy calling him a "Man of High Moral Principles." Tožička's candidacy was withdrawn on 4 March 2020 despite the regional organisation's stance.

The Czech government decided to delay the by-election due to COVID-19 pandemic in the Czech Republic. On 1 April 2020 the Supreme Administrative Court stated that the election had been postponed illegally, as the Government doesn't have jurisdiction to delay an election, noting that Parliament was supposed to decide about the delay. On 6 May 2020 a new election date was scheduled for 5 and 6 June 2020.

The first round was held on 5 and 6 June 2020. Mayor of Teplice Hynek Hanza and Headmaster of Teplice Grammar School Zdeněk Bergman advanced to the second round with 29.73% and 22.15% of votes respectively with Governor of Ústí nad Labem Region Oldřich Bubeniček in third place.

The runoff was held on 13 June 2020. Hanza received 57% of votes against Bergman's 43% of votes and thus won the election. Hanza stated that he appreciates the support voters gave him and feels it as a big obligation. Bergman congratulated him on the result despite admitting disappointment. Hanza will hold the seat until Autumn 2024. Voter turnout in the second round was only 9%.

== Candidates ==
- Zuzana Schwarz Bařtipánová (ANO 2011), Mayor of Bílina.
- Zdeněk Bergman (Senator 21), Headmaster of Teplice Grammar School.
- Oldřich Bubeniček (KSČM), Governor of Ústí nad Labem Region.
- Hynek Hanza (Civic Democratic Party), Mayor of Teplice.
- Bohumil Ježek (Freedom and Direct Democracy), member of Regional assembly.
- Zdeněk Pešek (Tricolour Citizens' Movement).
- Eugen Sigismund Freimann (Party of Common Sense).
- Jana Syslová (Mayors and Independents), Mayor of Hrobčice.
- Zbyněk Šimbera (Czech Social Democratic Party), Mayor of Duchcov.

=== Withdrawn ===
- Tomáš Tožička (Pirates), Journalist.

=== Disqualified ===
- Jan Vondrouš (Czech National Social Party)

== Opinion polls and media surveys ==
Date	Agency	Hynek Hanza	Zdeněk Bergman	Jana Syslová	Oldřich Bubeníček	Zdeněk Pešek	Zuzana Schwarz Bařtipánová	Zbyněk Šimbera	Bohumil Ježek	Eugen Sigismund Freimann
28 March 2019	Teplický deník	38.77	31.28	9.84	9.69	2.94	2.79	2.64	1.47	0.59

== Results ==
Candidate	Party	1st round		2nd round	
Hynek Hanza	Civic Democratic Party	4663	29.73%	5,302	57.17%
Zdeněk Bergman	Senator 21	3475	22.15%	3,972	42.83%
Oldřich Bubeniček	Communist Party of Bohemia and Moravia	2567	16.36%		
Zuzana Schwarz Bařtipánová	ANO 2011	1535	9.78%		
Jana Syslová	Mayors and Independents	1055	6.72%		
Zbyněk Šimbera	Czech Social Democratic Party	913	5.82%		
Bohumil Ježek	Freedom and Direct Democracy	765	4.87%		
Zdeněk Pešek	Tricolour Citizens' Movement	551	3.51%		
Eugen Sigismund Freimann	Party of Common Sense	160	1.02%		
Total valid votes		15684	98.68%		
Invalid votes			1.32%		
Total		15908			
Registered voters/turnout		100,725	15.79%	100,834	9.26%
Source:Czech Statistical Bureau

== Aftermath ==
Hanza was elected to become the Senator for the rest of Kubera's term which would expire in 2024. Hanza was sworn in office on 22 July 2020 and became 19th Member of the Civic Democratic Party Senate Caucus. Hanza joined Senate Committee on Spatial Development, Public Administration and the Environment.
