= Senate district 32 – Teplice =

Electoral district in the Czech Republic

32 – Teplice
- inline Senate district of the Czech Republic

- The Teplice district on a map
- Senator: Jan Schiller; ANO 2011
- Region: Ústí nad Labem
- District: Teplice
- Electorate: 100,001
- Area: 469.27 km²
- Last election: 2024
- Next election: 2030

Senate district 32 – Teplice is an electoral district of the Senate of the Czech Republic, which is formed by the entirety of the Teplice District. From 2024, an ANO 2011 member Jan Schiller is representing the district.

== Senators ==
Year	Senator	Party
1996 (Note: Election for shortened four-year term)	Jaroslav Musial	ČSSD
2000	Jaroslav Kubera	ODS
2006	Jaroslav Kubera	ODS
2012	Jaroslav Kubera	ODS
2018	Jaroslav Kubera	ODS
2020	Hynek Hanza	ODS
2024	Jan Schiller	ANO 2011

== Election results ==
=== 1996 ===
1996 Czech Senate election in Teplice
Candidate	Party	1st round		2nd round	
Candidate	Party	Votes	%	Votes	%
Jaroslav Musial	ČSSD	5 418	19.62	13 396	52.68
Jaroslav Kubera	ODS	9 170	33.22	12 034	47.32
Jaromír Kohlíček	KSČM	5 191	18.80	—	—
Jutta Kučerová	ČSNS	3 218	11.66	—	—
Jan Ševčík	KDU-ČSL	2 363	8.56	—	—
Čestmír Duda	Independent	1 479	5.36	—	—
Josef Horváth	Independent	570	2.06	—	—
Petr Bavor	RU	199	0.72	—	—

=== 2000 ===
2000 Czech Senate election in Teplice
Candidate	Party	1st round		2nd round	
Candidate	Party	Votes	%	Votes	%
Jaroslav Kubera	ODS	8 540	30.25	13 169	56.53
Oldřich Bubeníček	KSČM	7 742	27.43	10 123	43.46
Alenka Antošová	KDU-ČSL	5 047	17.88	—	—
Valtr Komárek	ČSSD	4 223	14.96	—	—
František Voháňka	NEZ	1 074	3.80	—	—
Tomáš Říman	Independent	894	3.16	—	—
Vilém Schneider	CAO	441	1.56	—	—
Pavel Svoboda	ČSDH	262	0.92	—	—

=== 2006 ===
2006 Czech Senate election in Teplice
Candidate	Party	1st round		2nd round	
Candidate	Party	Votes	%	Votes	%
Jaroslav Kubera	ODS	14 252	41.30	11 782	61.17
Oldřich Bubeníček	KSČM	6 847	19.84	7 479	38.82
Milan Pecháček	ČSSD	5 131	14.87	—	—
Alenka Antošová	KDU-ČSL	3 540	10.25	—	—
Pavel Rajčan	SNK ED	2 161	6.26	—	—
Petr Benda	SZ	1 613	4.67	—	—
Vladimír Procházka	NEZ/DEM	959	2.77	—	—

=== 2012 ===
2012 Czech Senate election in Teplice
Candidate	Party	1st round		2nd round	
Candidate	Party	Votes	%	Votes	%
Jaroslav Kubera	ODS	12 582	40.49	13 130	66.84
Jaroslav Dubský	KSČM	5 755	18.52	6 513	33.15
Petr Pípal	S.cz	4 880	15.70	—	—
Jiří Řehák	SZ, HNHRM, B10	3 487	11.22	—	—
Jiří Vorálek	ČSSD	2 529	8.13	—	—
Alenka Antošová	KDU-ČSL	888	2.85	—	—
Štěpán Knézel	NÁR.SOC.	708	2.27	—	—
Jaromír Tasáry	SsČR	240	0.77	—	—

=== 2018 ===
2018 Czech Senate election in Teplice
Candidate	Party	1st round		2nd round	
Candidate	Party	Votes	%	Votes	%
Jaroslav Kubera	ODS	14 377	41.81	8 824	55.60
Zdeněk Bergman	SEN 21	7 257	21.10	7 046	44.39
Jan Zahradníček	SPD	3 814	11.09	—	—
Tomáš Zíka	KSČM	3 050	8.86	—	—
Pavel Šedlbauer	TOP 09	2 155	6.26	—	—
Ivan Vinický	ČSSD	1 508	4.38	—	—
Eugen Sigismund Freimann	Rozumní	1 092	3.17	—	—
Terezie Holovská	SPOZ	642	1.86	—	—
Josef Barta	OČR	491	1.42	—	—

=== 2020 ===
A by-election was held in 2020 after the death of the incumbent Jaroslav Kubera.

2020 Teplice by-election
Candidate	Party	1st round		2nd round	
Candidate	Party	Votes	%	Votes	%
Hynek Hanza	ODS	4 663	29,73	5 302	57,17
Zdeněk Bergman	SEN 21	3 475	22,15	3 972	42,82
Oldřich Bubeníček	KSČM	2 567	16,36	—	—
Zuzana Schwarz Bařtipánová	ANO 2011	1 535	9,78	—	—
Jana Syslová	STAN	1 055	6,72	—	—
Zbyněk Šimbera	ČSSD	913	5,82	—	—
Bohumil Ježek	SPD	765	4,87	—	—
Zdeněk Pešek	Tricolour	551	3,51	—	—
Eugen Sigismund Freimann	Rozumní	160	1,02	—	—

=== 2024 ===
2024 Czech Senate election in Teplice
Candidate	Party	1st round		2nd round	
Candidate	Party	Votes	%	Votes	%
Jan Schiller	ANO 2011	10 234	41.32	8 564	57.20
Hynek Hanza	ODS	6 307	25.46	6 408	42.79
Jiří Řehák	SEN 21	5 146	20.77	—	—
Tomáš Vandas	ND, DSSS, BEZ-UL, ANS	1 584	6.39	—	—
Zdeněk Žák	SpV	943	3.80	—	—
Ivan Vinický	ČSSD	552	2.22	—	—
