= 2020 Guamanian local elections =

Local elections in Guam

- November 3, 2020
- Mayoral elections

19 mayors
	Majority party	Minority party
Party	Democratic	Republican
Mayors	10	9
Change	Steady	Steady
Votes	16,619	10,922
Percentage	59.54%	39.13%
- Winners of mayoral elections by partisan lean
- Vice mayoral elections

7 vice mayors
	Majority party	Minority party
Party	Democratic	Republican
Vice mayors	4	3
Change	▲2	▼2
Votes	9,329	6,412
Percentage	58.42%	40.15%
- Winners of vice mayoral elections by partisan lean

Mayoral elections in Guam were held on November 3, 2020, to elect mayors of nineteen villages in Guam and vice mayors in seven.

== Mayoral elections ==
Village	Incumbent	Party	First elected	Result	General election			
Agana Heights	Paul M. McDonald	Republican	1992	Incumbent re-elected.				
Agana Heights	Paul M. McDonald	Republican	1992	Incumbent re-elected.	Republican	Paul M. McDonald	587	52.60%
Agana Heights	Paul M. McDonald	Republican	1992	Incumbent re-elected.	Democratic	Jesse Flores Pangelinan	274	24.55%
Agana Heights	Paul M. McDonald	Republican	1992	Incumbent re-elected.	Democratic	Jesse Munoz Fujikawa	254	22.76%
Agana Heights	Paul M. McDonald	Republican	1992	Incumbent re-elected.	Write-in		1	0.09%
Agana Heights	Paul M. McDonald	Republican	1992	Incumbent re-elected.	Total		1,116	100.00%
Asan-Maina	Frankie A. Salas	Democratic	2016	Incumbent re-elected.				
Asan-Maina	Frankie A. Salas	Democratic	2016	Incumbent re-elected.	Democratic	Frankie A. Salas	295	45.74%
Asan-Maina	Frankie A. Salas	Democratic	2016	Incumbent re-elected.	Democratic	John Joseph Gumataotao	240	37.21%
Asan-Maina	Frankie A. Salas	Democratic	2016	Incumbent re-elected.	Republican	MiChelle Hope Taitano	110	17.05%
Asan-Maina	Frankie A. Salas	Democratic	2016	Incumbent re-elected.	Write-in		0	0.00%
Asan-Maina	Frankie A. Salas	Democratic	2016	Incumbent re-elected.	Total		645	100.00%
Barrigada	June U. Blas	Democratic	2012	Incumbent re-elected.				
Barrigada	June U. Blas	Democratic	2012	Incumbent re-elected.	Democratic	June U. Blas	1,728	98.63%
Barrigada	June U. Blas	Democratic	2012	Incumbent re-elected.	Write-in		24	1.37%
Barrigada	June U. Blas	Democratic	2012	Incumbent re-elected.	Total		1,752	100.00%
Chalan Pago-Ordot	Jessy C. Gogue	Democratic	2008	Incumbent re-elected.				
Chalan Pago-Ordot	Jessy C. Gogue	Democratic	2008	Incumbent re-elected.	Democratic	Jessy C. Gogue	1,322	98.29%
Chalan Pago-Ordot	Jessy C. Gogue	Democratic	2008	Incumbent re-elected.	Write-in		23	1.71%
Chalan Pago-Ordot	Jessy C. Gogue	Democratic	2008	Incumbent re-elected.	Total		1,345	100.00%
Dededo	Melissa B. Savares	Democratic	2004	Incumbent re-elected.				
Dededo	Melissa B. Savares	Democratic	2004	Incumbent re-elected.	Democratic	Melissa B. Savares	3,023	57.76%
Dededo	Melissa B. Savares	Democratic	2004	Incumbent re-elected.	Republican	Jose Acfalle San Agustin	2,200	42.03%
Dededo	Melissa B. Savares	Democratic	2004	Incumbent re-elected.	Write-in		11	0.21%
Dededo	Melissa B. Savares	Democratic	2004	Incumbent re-elected.	Total		5,234	100.00%
Hågat	Kevin J.T. Susuico	Republican	2016	Incumbent re-elected.				
Hågat	Kevin J.T. Susuico	Republican	2016	Incumbent re-elected.	Republican	Kevin J.T. Susuico	812	61.99%
Hågat	Kevin J.T. Susuico	Republican	2016	Incumbent re-elected.	Democratic	MayAnn Babauta Charfauros	492	37.55%
Hågat	Kevin J.T. Susuico	Republican	2016	Incumbent re-elected.	Write-in		6	0.46%
Hågat	Kevin J.T. Susuico	Republican	2016	Incumbent re-elected.	Total		1,310	100.00%
Hagåtña	John A. Cruz	Republican	2004	Incumbent re-elected.				
Hagåtña	John A. Cruz	Republican	2004	Incumbent re-elected.	Republican	John A. Cruz	210	93.75%
Hagåtña	John A. Cruz	Republican	2004	Incumbent re-elected.	Write-in		14	6.25%
Hagåtña	John A. Cruz	Republican	2004	Incumbent re-elected.	Total		224	100.00%
Humåtak	Johnny A. Quinata	Republican	2012	Incumbent re-elected.				
Humåtak	Johnny A. Quinata	Republican	2012	Incumbent re-elected.	Republican	Johnny A. Quinata	258	57.46%
Humåtak	Johnny A. Quinata	Republican	2012	Incumbent re-elected.	Democratic	Gilbert Quinata Aguon	128	28.51%
Humåtak	Johnny A. Quinata	Republican	2012	Incumbent re-elected.	Democratic	Andy Aguon Santiago	63	14.03%
Humåtak	Johnny A. Quinata	Republican	2012	Incumbent re-elected.	Write-in		0	6.25%
Humåtak	Johnny A. Quinata	Republican	2012	Incumbent re-elected.	Total		449	100.00%
Inalåhan	Doris F. Lujan	Democratic	2012	Incumbent retired. New mayor elected. Democratic hold.				
Inalåhan	Doris F. Lujan	Democratic	2012	Incumbent retired. New mayor elected. Democratic hold.	Democratic	Anthony P. Chargualaf Jr.	819	59.74%
Inalåhan	Doris F. Lujan	Democratic	2012	Incumbent retired. New mayor elected. Democratic hold.	Democratic	Kenneth D. Mantanona	552	40.26%
Inalåhan	Doris F. Lujan	Democratic	2012	Incumbent retired. New mayor elected. Democratic hold.	Write-in		0	0.00%
Inalåhan	Doris F. Lujan	Democratic	2012	Incumbent retired. New mayor elected. Democratic hold.	Total		1,371	100.00%
Malesso'	Ernest T. Chargualaf	Republican	2008	Incumbent re-elected.				
Malesso'	Ernest T. Chargualaf	Republican	2008	Incumbent re-elected.	Republican	Ernest T. Chargualaf	282	33.65%
Malesso'	Ernest T. Chargualaf	Republican	2008	Incumbent re-elected.	Democratic	Stephen Michael Cruz	208	24.82%
Malesso'	Ernest T. Chargualaf	Republican	2008	Incumbent re-elected.	Democratic	Julie San Nicolas Cruz	182	21.72%
Malesso'	Ernest T. Chargualaf	Republican	2008	Incumbent re-elected.	Democratic	John P. Taijeron	165	19.69%
Malesso'	Ernest T. Chargualaf	Republican	2008	Incumbent re-elected.	Write-in		1	6.12%
Malesso'	Ernest T. Chargualaf	Republican	2008	Incumbent re-elected.	Total		838	100.00%
Mangilao	Allan R.G. Ungacta	Republican	2016	Incumbent re-elected.				
Mangilao	Allan R.G. Ungacta	Republican	2016	Incumbent re-elected.	Republican	Allan R.G. Ungacta	2,137	99.26%
Mangilao	Allan R.G. Ungacta	Republican	2016	Incumbent re-elected.	Write-in		16	0.74%
Mangilao	Allan R.G. Ungacta	Republican	2016	Incumbent re-elected.	Total		2,153	100.00%
Mongmong-Toto-Maite	Rudy A. Paco	Democratic	2016	Incumbent re-elected.				
Mongmong-Toto-Maite	Rudy A. Paco	Democratic	2016	Incumbent re-elected.	Democratic	Rudy A. Paco	1,021	92.73%
Mongmong-Toto-Maite	Rudy A. Paco	Democratic	2016	Incumbent re-elected.	Write-in		80	7.27%
Mongmong-Toto-Maite	Rudy A. Paco	Democratic	2016	Incumbent re-elected.	Total		1,101	100.00%
Piti	Jesse L.G. Alig	Republican	2016	Incumbent re-elected.				
Piti	Jesse L.G. Alig	Republican	2016	Incumbent re-elected.	Republican	Jesse L.G. Alig	471	90.75%
Piti	Jesse L.G. Alig	Republican	2016	Incumbent re-elected.	Democratic	Frank J.R. Cabrera	48	9.25%
Piti	Jesse L.G. Alig	Republican	2016	Incumbent re-elected.	Write-in		0	0.00%
Piti	Jesse L.G. Alig	Republican	2016	Incumbent re-elected.	Total		519	100.00%
Sånta Rita-Sumai	Dale E. Alvarez	Democratic	2008	Incumbent re-elected.				
Sånta Rita-Sumai	Dale E. Alvarez	Democratic	2008	Incumbent re-elected.	Democratic	Dale E. Alvarez	753	69.08%
Sånta Rita-Sumai	Dale E. Alvarez	Democratic	2008	Incumbent re-elected.	Republican	Kelly Aguito Lizama	332	30.46%
Sånta Rita-Sumai	Dale E. Alvarez	Democratic	2008	Incumbent re-elected.	Write-in		5	0.46%
Sånta Rita-Sumai	Dale E. Alvarez	Democratic	2008	Incumbent re-elected.	Total		1,090	100.00%
Talo'fo'fo	Vicente S. Taitague	Democratic	1996 (Note: Non-consecutive, serving current term since 2008)	Incumbent re-elected.				
Talo'fo'fo	Vicente S. Taitague	Democratic	1996	Incumbent re-elected.	Democratic	Vicente S. Taitague	575	54.25%
Talo'fo'fo	Vicente S. Taitague	Democratic	1996	Incumbent re-elected.	Democratic	Thomas C. Diego	301	28.40%
Talo'fo'fo	Vicente S. Taitague	Democratic	1996	Incumbent re-elected.	Democratic	Albert Santos Atoigue	180	16.98%
Talo'fo'fo	Vicente S. Taitague	Democratic	1996	Incumbent re-elected.	Write-in		4	0.38%
Talo'fo'fo	Vicente S. Taitague	Democratic	1996	Incumbent re-elected.	Total		1,060	100.00%
Sinajana	Robert R.D.C. Hofmann	Democratic	2012	Incumbent re-elected.				
Sinajana	Robert R.D.C. Hofmann	Democratic	2012	Incumbent re-elected.	Democratic	Robert R.D.C. Hofmann	967	98.47%
Sinajana	Robert R.D.C. Hofmann	Democratic	2012	Incumbent re-elected.	Write-in		15	1.53%
Sinajana	Robert R.D.C. Hofmann	Democratic	2012	Incumbent re-elected.	Total		982	100.00%
Tamuning	Louise Cruz Rivera	Republican	2012	Incumbent re-elected.				
Tamuning	Louise Cruz Rivera	Republican	2012	Incumbent re-elected.	Republican	Louise Cruz Rivera	1,404	63.65%
Tamuning	Louise Cruz Rivera	Republican	2012	Incumbent re-elected.	Democratic	Alan C. Torrado	643	29.15%
Tamuning	Louise Cruz Rivera	Republican	2012	Incumbent re-elected.	Write-in		159	7.21%
Tamuning	Louise Cruz Rivera	Republican	2012	Incumbent re-elected.	Total		2,206	100.00%
Yigo	Rudy M. Matanane	Republican	2012	Incumbent retired. New mayor elected. Republican hold.				
Yigo	Rudy M. Matanane	Republican	2012	Incumbent retired. New mayor elected. Republican hold.	Republican	Tony P. Sanchez	788	27.70%
Yigo	Rudy M. Matanane	Republican	2012	Incumbent retired. New mayor elected. Republican hold.	Democratic	Frances Sudo Lizama	775	27.24%
Yigo	Rudy M. Matanane	Republican	2012	Incumbent retired. New mayor elected. Republican hold.	Democratic	Peter Martin Pascual	435	15.29%
Yigo	Rudy M. Matanane	Republican	2012	Incumbent retired. New mayor elected. Republican hold.	Republican	James Gary Santos	298	10.48%
Yigo	Rudy M. Matanane	Republican	2012	Incumbent retired. New mayor elected. Republican hold.	Democratic	Linnian Opena Guerrero	290	10.19%
Yigo	Rudy M. Matanane	Republican	2012	Incumbent retired. New mayor elected. Republican hold.	Democratic	Dennis David Flores	255	8.96%
Yigo	Rudy M. Matanane	Republican	2012	Incumbent retired. New mayor elected. Republican hold.	Write-in		4	0.14%
Yigo	Rudy M. Matanane	Republican	2012	Incumbent retired. New mayor elected. Republican hold.	Total		2,845	100.00%
Yona	Bill Aguon Quenga	Democratic	2020 (special)	Incumbent re-elected.				
Yona	Bill Aguon Quenga	Democratic	2020 (special)	Incumbent re-elected.	Democratic	Bill Aguon Quenga	1,245	73.67%
Yona	Bill Aguon Quenga	Democratic	2020 (special)	Incumbent re-elected.	Democratic	Edward Toves Terlaje	439	25.98%
Yona	Bill Aguon Quenga	Democratic	2020 (special)	Incumbent re-elected.	Write-in		6	0.36%
Yona	Bill Aguon Quenga	Democratic	2020 (special)	Incumbent re-elected.	Total		1,690	100.00%
Source...

== Vice mayoral elections ==
Village	Incumbent	Party	First elected	Result	General election			
Barrigada	Jessie P. Bautista	Democratic	2012	Incumbent re-elected.				
Barrigada	Jessie P. Bautista	Democratic	2012	Incumbent re-elected.	Democratic	Jessie P. Bautista	1,691	98.72%
Barrigada	Jessie P. Bautista	Democratic	2012	Incumbent re-elected.	Write-in		22	1.28%
Barrigada	Jessie P. Bautista	Democratic	2012	Incumbent re-elected.	Total		1,713	100.00%
Dededo	Frank A. Benavente	Republican	2016	Incumbent retired. New mayor elected. Democratic gain.				
Dededo	Frank A. Benavente	Republican	2016	Incumbent retired. New mayor elected. Democratic gain.	Democratic	Peter John S. Benavente	3,514	67.86%
Dededo	Frank A. Benavente	Republican	2016	Incumbent retired. New mayor elected. Democratic gain.	Republican	Vincent Arriola Cabrera	1,659	32.04%
Dededo	Frank A. Benavente	Republican	2016	Incumbent retired. New mayor elected. Democratic gain.	Write-in		5	0.10%
Dededo	Frank A. Benavente	Republican	2016	Incumbent retired. New mayor elected. Democratic gain.	Total		5,178	100.00%
Hågat	Christopher J. Fejeran	Republican	2016	Incumbent re-elected.				
Hågat	Christopher J. Fejeran	Republican	2016	Incumbent re-elected.	Republican	Christopher J. Fejeran	849	65.26%
Hågat	Christopher J. Fejeran	Republican	2016	Incumbent re-elected.	Democratic	Jocelyn Aguigui Reyes	451	34.67%
Hågat	Christopher J. Fejeran	Republican	2016	Incumbent re-elected.	Write-in		1	0.08%
Hågat	Christopher J. Fejeran	Republican	2016	Incumbent re-elected.	Total		1,301	100.00%
Mangilao	Thomas J.F. Duenas	Republican	2016	Incumbent lost re-election. Democratic gain.				
Mangilao	Thomas J.F. Duenas	Republican	2016	Incumbent lost re-election. Democratic gain.	Democratic	Kevin A.N. Delgado	1,392	61.84%
Mangilao	Thomas J.F. Duenas	Republican	2016	Incumbent lost re-election. Democratic gain.	Republican	Thomas J.F. Duenas	826	36.69%
Mangilao	Thomas J.F. Duenas	Republican	2016	Incumbent lost re-election. Democratic gain.	Write-in		33	1.47%
Mangilao	Thomas J.F. Duenas	Republican	2016	Incumbent lost re-election. Democratic gain.	Total		2,251	100.00%
Sinajana	Rudy Don Iriarte	Democratic	2012	Incumbent re-elected.				
Sinajana	Rudy Don Iriarte	Democratic	2012	Incumbent re-elected.	Democratic	Rudy Don Iriarte	703	67.79%
Sinajana	Rudy Don Iriarte	Democratic	2012	Incumbent re-elected.	Republican	Joseph Jesse Rivera	331	31.92%
Sinajana	Rudy Don Iriarte	Democratic	2012	Incumbent re-elected.	Write-in		3	0.29%
Sinajana	Rudy Don Iriarte	Democratic	2012	Incumbent re-elected.	Total		1,037	100.00%
Tamuning	Kenneth C. Santos	Republican	2012	Incumbent retired October 30, 2020. New mayor elected. Republican hold.				
Tamuning	Kenneth C. Santos	Republican	2012	Incumbent retired October 30, 2020. New mayor elected. Republican hold.	Republican	Albert Mendiola Toves	922	51.83%
Tamuning	Kenneth C. Santos	Republican	2012	Incumbent retired October 30, 2020. New mayor elected. Republican hold.	Democratic	Javier M. Atalig Jr.	779	43.79%
Tamuning	Kenneth C. Santos	Republican	2012	Incumbent retired October 30, 2020. New mayor elected. Republican hold.	Write-in		159	7.21%
Tamuning	Kenneth C. Santos	Republican	2012	Incumbent retired October 30, 2020. New mayor elected. Republican hold.	Total		2,206	100.00%
Yigo	Tony P. Sanchez	Republican	2012	Incumbent retired to run for governor. New mayor elected. Republican hold.				
Yigo	Tony P. Sanchez	Republican	2012	Incumbent retired to run for governor. New mayor elected. Republican hold.	Republican	Loreto V. Leones	1,046	38.60%
Yigo	Tony P. Sanchez	Republican	2012	Incumbent retired to run for governor. New mayor elected. Republican hold.	Democratic	Sylvia A. Flores	951	35.09%
Yigo	Tony P. Sanchez	Republican	2012	Incumbent retired to run for governor. New mayor elected. Republican hold.	Democratic	Edward Joseph Laguana Lujan	627	23.14%
Yigo	Tony P. Sanchez	Republican	2012	Incumbent retired to run for governor. New mayor elected. Republican hold.	Write-in		86	3.17%
Yigo	Tony P. Sanchez	Republican	2012	Incumbent retired to run for governor. New mayor elected. Republican hold.	Total		2,710	100.00%

== See also ==
- 2020 Guamanian legislative election
- 2020 United States House of Representatives election in Guam
- 2020 United States presidential straw poll in Guam
