= Hynek Hanza =

Czech politician

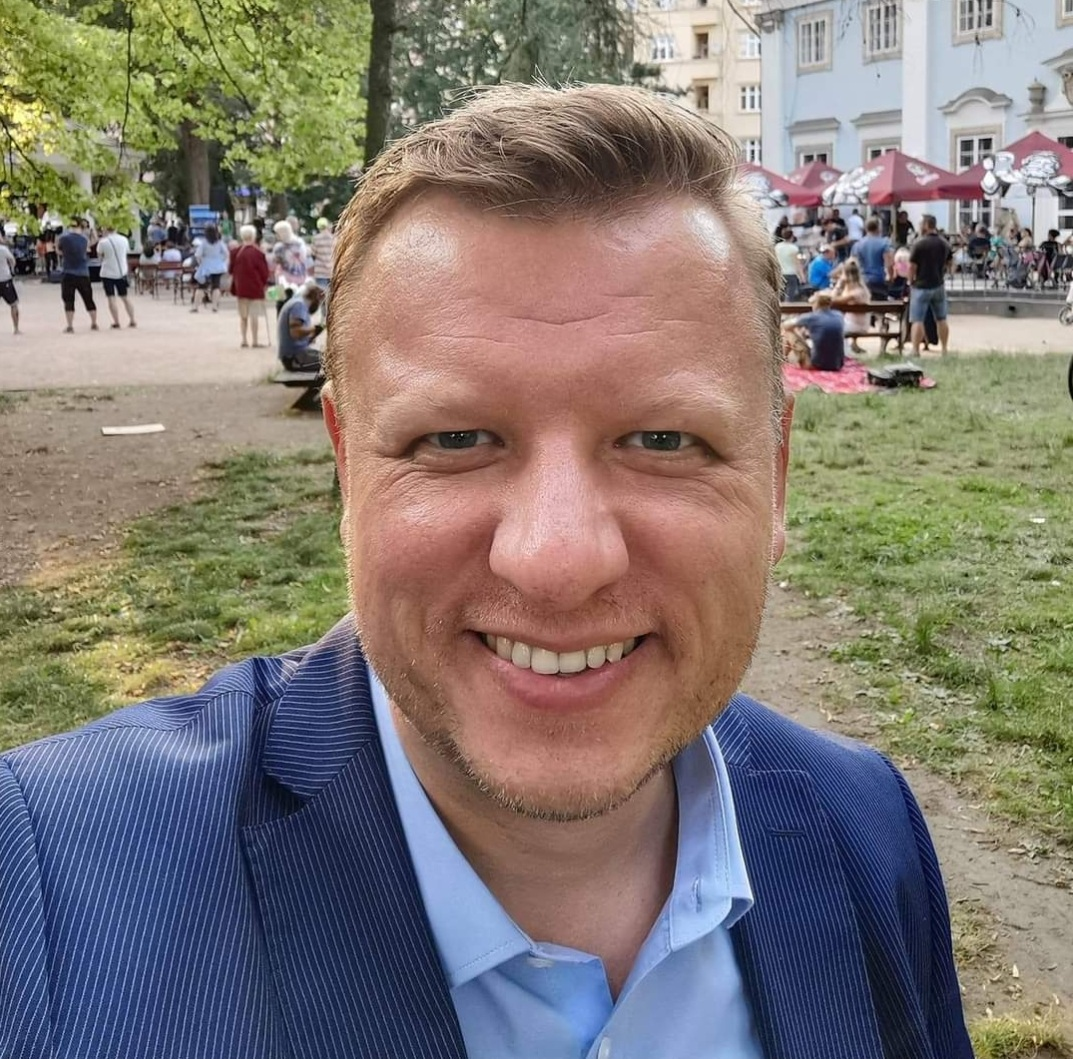

Senator from Teplice
- In office 13 June 2020 – 13 October 2024
- Preceded by: Jaroslav Kubera
- Succeeded by: Jan Schiller

Mayor of Teplice
- In office 2 November 2018 – 3 October 2022
- Preceded by: Jaroslav Kubera
- Succeeded by: Jiří Štábl

Personal details
- Born: 14 October 1977 Teplice, Czechoslovakia (now Czech Republic)
- Party: ODS

Hynek Hanza (*14 October 1977) is a Czech Civic Democratic politician who served as Senator representing Teplice and a Mayor of Teplice as a successor of Jaroslav Kubera.

== Biography ==
Hanza was born in Teplice in 1977. He studied Teplice Grammar School and then Economy at Technical University of Liberec. He joined the Civic Democratic Party (ODS) in 1997. His father co-founded ODS in Teplice.

When Mayor of Teplice Jaroslav Kubera decided to step down in 2018 Hanza replaced him in the position. When Kubera died 2 years later. Hanza replaced him as a Senator of Teplice district following a by-election.
