= 2020 Nigerien local elections =

Local election in Niger

Local elections were held on 13 December 2020 in the 266 municipalities of Niger.
