= 2020 San Diego City Attorney election =

- November 3, 2020
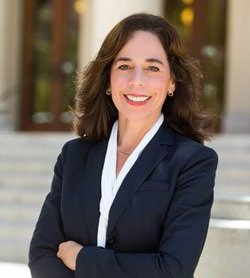

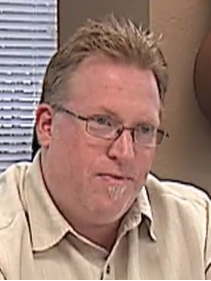
Nominee	Mara Elliott	Cory Briggs
Popular vote	375,060	187,791
Percentage	66.6%	33.4%
City Attorney before election
Mara Elliott
Elected City Attorney
Mara Elliott

The 2020 San Diego City Attorney election was scheduled for Tuesday, November 3, 2020. The primary election was held on Tuesday, March 3, 2020.

Municipal elections in California are officially non-partisan, although most members do identify a party preference. A two-round system was used for the election, starting with a primary in March followed by a runoff in November between the top two candidates. Incumbent City Attorney Mara Elliott advanced from the primary election to face private sector attorney Cory Briggs in the general election.

== Campaign ==
The incumbent City Attorney Mara Elliott stood for reelection to a second term. She was challenged for the position by two private sector attorneys: Cory Briggs and Pete Mesich.

In the March primary, Elliott received about two-thirds of the vote to advance to the general election against Briggs, the closest runner-up.

== Polling ==
=== Primary election ===
Poll source	Date(s) administered	Sample size (Note: Key: A – all adults RV – registered voters LV – likely voters V – unclear)	Margin of error	Mara Elliott	Cory Briggs	Pete Mesich	Undecided
SurveyUSA/KGTV-TV/San Diego Union-Tribune	February 6–8, 2020	527 (LV)	± 5.3%	28%	15%	9%	47%
SurveyUSA/KGTV-TV/San Diego Union-Tribune	January 16–19, 2020	518 (LV)	± 5.2%	28%	18%	6%	48%

=== General election ===
Poll source	Date(s) administered	Sample size	Margin of error	Mara Elliott	Cory Briggs	Undecided
SurveyUSA/KGTV-TV/San Diego Union-Tribune	October 1–5, 2020	547 (LV)	± 5.3%	28%	22%	50%
SurveyUSA/KGTV-TV/San Diego Union-Tribune	August 28–31, 2020	517 (LV)	± 5.3%	30%	20%	50%

== Results ==
2020 San Diego City Attorney election
Primary election
Candidate	Votes	%
Mara W. Elliott	208,767	67.9%
Cory Briggs	71,672	23.3%
Pete Mesich	47,072	8.9%
Total votes	307,662	100%
General election
Mara W. Elliott	375,060	66.6%
Cory Briggs	187,791	33.4%
Total votes	562,851	100%
