= 2020 Kyoto mayoral election =

- 2 February 2020
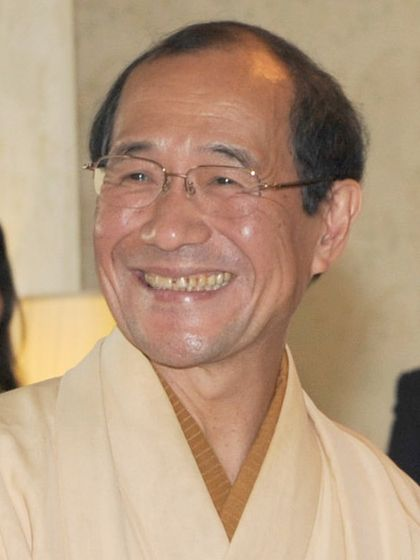

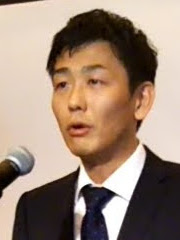
		JCP
Candidate	Daisaku Kadokawa	Kazuto Fukuyama	Shōei Murayama
Party	Independent	Independent	Independent
Popular vote	210,640	161,618	94,859
Percentage	45.09%	34.60%	20.31%
Supported by	LDP, CDP, Komeito, DPP, SDP	JCP, Reiwa
- Results by Ward; Kadokawa: 40-50% 50-60% Fukuyama: 30-40%
Mayor before election
Daisaku Kadokawa
Independent
Elected mayor
Daisaku Kadokawa
Independent

The 2020 Kyoto mayoral election was held on February 2, 2020. Incumbent mayor Daisaku Kadokawa ran for a fourth term, against JCP-backed independent Kazuto Fukuyama and former Kyoto Party Independent Shōei Murayama. Kadokawa won by a margin of nearly ten points, making him one of the longest serving mayors of Kyoto.

== Overview ==
The election was held after the incumbent, Daisaku Kadokawa, term expired. On October 14, 2019, local Kyoto Party representative Shōei Murayama announced his intention to leave the party and run as an independent. On October 17, Kadokawa announced his intention to run for a fourth term. A few weeks later, on November 8, lawyer Kazuto Fukuyama announced his candidacy with the intention of receiving support from the Democratic City Government Association, an organization made up of citizens groups working with opposition parties, labor unions, and the JCP. Hirohiko Terada, a representative of a local volunteer group, also announced his intention to receive support from the group, but ultimately decided against running for office.

All candidates were technically independent, though only one, Shōei Murayama, did not receive any outside support from a political party or organization, claiming to be a "citizens candidate". Incumbent Mayor Kadokawa was backed by a union of opposition and governmental forces, including the LDP, CDP, Komeito, the DPP, and the SDP. Meanwhile, Fukuyama was backed by newly founded party Reiwa Shinsengumi and the JCP. Nippon Ishin no Kai had originally planned, in 2016, to field Murayama as a candidate, but Murayama fell through with the party. Initially planning to run its own candidate, the party faced difficulty in finding a candidate, eventually letting supporters independently vote for their own candidate.

== Candidates ==
Three candidates qualified, two of which were backed by national parties.

Name	Age	Party	Title
Shōei Murayama	41	Independent	Former Kyoto City Councilor
Daisaku Kadokawa	65	Independent (Backed by LDP, CDP, Komeito, DPP, SDP)	Incumbent Mayor of Kyoto; Former Superintendent of Education in Kyoto
Kazuto Fukuyama	58	Independent (Backed by JCP, Reiwa)	Kyoto Education Center Executive Director; Former City Teachers Union Executive Committee Chairman

== Results ==
Candidate	Party	Votes	%	+/–
Daisaku Kadokawa	Independent, LDP, CDP, Komeito, DPP, SDP	210,640	45.09	–18.71
Kazuto Fukuyama	Independent, JCP, Reiwa	161,618	34.60	N/A
Shōei Murayama	Independent	94,859	20.31	N/A
Total		467,117	100.00	–
Valid votes		467,117	98.94	
Invalid/blank votes		4,988	1.06	
Total votes		472,105	100.00	
Registered voters/turnout		1,159,615	40.71	+5.03
Source: Kyoto City Council, Eonet

=== By ward ===
Ward Counting Results
Ward	Daisaku Kadokawa		Kazuto Fukuyama		Shōei Murayama	
Ward	Votes	%	Votes	%	Votes	%
Total	210,640	45.09%	161,618	34.60%	94,859	20.31%
Kita	16,859	41.86%	14,994	37.23%	8,424	20.92%
Kamigyō	12,025	42.35%	10,635	37.45%	5,735	20.20%
Sakyō	19,159	32.03%	22,558	37.72%	18,091	30.25%
Nakagyō	16,184	42.33%	13,542	35.42%	8,507	22.25%
Higashiyama	5,093	41.67%	4,493	36.76%	2,635	21.56%
Yamashina	21,770	52.61%	12,908	31.20%	6,699	16.19%
Shimogyō	11,260	44.09%	8,479	33.20%	5,799	22.71%
Minami	13,831	49.00%	9,562	33.88%	4,833	17.12%
Ukyō	29,528	45.39%	22,846	35.12%	12,675	19.49%
Nishikyō	23,248	48.37%	15,691	32.65%	9,121	18.98%
Fushimi	41,683	52.15%	25,910	32.41%	12,340	15.44%
