= 2020 Utah Constitutional Amendment A =

Constitutional Amendment 3
- November 3, 2020
- Gender-Neutral Constitutional Language Amendment

Results
Choice	Votes	%
Yes	828,629	57.69%
No	607,829	42.31%
Total votes	1,436,458	100.00%
Registered voters/turnout	1,857,861	77.32%
County results
Yes
70–80%
60–70%
50–60%
No
60–70%
50–60%

The Utah Gender-Neutral Constitutional Language Amendment, appearing on the ballot as Utah Constitutional Amendment A, is a constitutional amendment in Utah, which appeared on the ballot on November 3, 2020.

The amendment intended to replace all gendered language in the Constitution of Utah with gender-neutral language. According to Deidre Henderson, the State Senator who proposed the amendment, only 6 of the 237 sections of the constitution would be modified, in order to bring them in line with the other 231 sections, which already use gender-neutral language. The amendment was unanimously approved in both the State Senate and the Utah House of Representatives, allowing it to be put on the ballot. If the amendment was passed by voters, it would go into effect on January 1, 2021.

The amendment passed with 57.69% of the votes.

== Results ==
Choice	Votes	%
✓ Yes	828,629	57.69%
No	607,829	42.31%
Total	1,436,458	100.00%
Registered voters/turnout	1,857,861	77.31%
Source: Lieutenant Governor's Office
