= 2020 Nebraska elections =

The 2020 Nebraska elections were held on November 3, 2020. In addition to the U.S. presidential race, Nebraska voters elected the Class II U.S. Senator from Nebraska, one of its Public Service Commissioners, two of eight voting members on the Nebraska University Board of Regents, four of eight seats on the Nebraska State Board of Education, all of its seats to the House of Representatives, two of seven seats on the Nebraska Supreme Court, two of six seats on the Nebraska Court of Appeals, and 25 of 49 seats in the unicameral Nebraska Legislature. Six ballot measures were also voted on.

== President of the United States ==
Incumbent Republican President Donald Trump was challenged by Democratic nominee Joe Biden in 2020.

== United States Senate ==
Incumbent Republican Senator Ben Sasse ran for re-election to a second term. He faced Chris Janicek, the Democratic nominee, in the general election, but following allegations of sexual misconduct by Janicek, the Nebraska Democratic Party supported write-in candidate Preston Love Jr. in the general election.

2020 United States Senate election in Nebraska
Party	Candidate	Votes	%	±%
Republican	Ben Sasse (inc.)	583,507	62.74%	−1.60%
Democratic	Chris Janicek	227,191	24.43%	−7.06%
Democratic	Preston Love Jr. (write-in)	58,411	6.28%	—
Libertarian	Gene Siadek	55,115	5.93%	—
Write-in		5,788	0.62%	—
Majority		356,316	38.31%	+5.46%
Total votes		930,012	100.0%	
Republican hold				

== United States House of Representatives ==
All three of Nebraska's members in the United States House of Representatives ran for re-election. All three won re-election.

District	Republican		Democratic		Others		Total		Result
District	Votes	%	Votes	%	Votes	%	Votes	%	Result
District 1	189,006	59.52%	119,622	37.67%	8,938	2.81%	317,566	100.0%	Republican hold
District 2	171,071	50.77%	155,706	46.21%	10,185	3.02%	336,962	100.0%	Republican hold
District 3	225,157	78.51%	50,690	17.68%	10,923	3.81%	286,770	100.0%	Republican hold
Total	585,234	62.17%	326,018	34.63%	30,046	3.19%	941,298	100.0%	

== Public Service Commission ==
=== District 2 ===
Incumbent Public Service Commissioner Crystal Rhoades, a Democrat, ran for re-election to a second term. Tim Davis, a restaurant server, won the Republican primary to challenge Rhoades. Rhoades defeated Davis in a landslide, winning 63% of the vote. Two years into her term, however, Rhoades was elected Douglas County Clerk of the District Court and resigned her position.

==== Democratic primary ====
===== Candidates =====
- Crystal Rhoades, incumbent Commissioner

====== Results ======
Democratic primary results
Party	Candidate	Votes	%
Democratic	Crystal Rhoades (inc.)	37,913	100.00%
Total votes		37,913	100.00%

==== Republican primary ====
===== Candidates =====
- Tim Davis, restaurant server
- Krystal Gabel, cybersecurity technical writer and business analyst

===== Results =====
Republican primary results
Party	Candidate	Votes	%
Republican	Tim Davis	11,537	55.81%
Republican	Krystal Gabel	9,131	44.19%
Total votes		20,668	100.00%

==== General election ====
2020 Nebraska Public Service Commission, District 2 election
Party	Candidate	Votes	%	±%
Democratic	Crystal Rhoades (inc.)	95,119	62.67%	
Republican	Tim Davis	56,698	37.33%	
Total votes		151,817	100.00%	
Democratic hold		Swing	{{{swing}}}	

== State Board of Education ==
=== District 1 ===
Incumbent Board member Patsy Koch Johns was unopposed for re-election.

==== Candidates ====
- Patsy Koch Johns, incumbent Board member

==== Primary election results ====
Nonpartisan primary results
Party	Candidate	Votes	%
Nonpartisan	Patsy Koch Johns (inc.)	51,460	100.00%
Total votes		51,460	100.00%

==== General election results ====
Nonpartisan primary results
Party	Candidate	Votes	%
Nonpartisan	Patsy Koch Johns (inc.)	93,015	100.00%
Total votes		93,015	100.00%

=== District 2 ===
Incumbent Board member Lisa Fricke ran for re-election to a second term. She was challenged by Robert Anthony, a real estate agent. Though the race was formally nonpartisan, Fricke was a Democrat and Anthony was a Republican. Fricke ended up defeating Anthony in a landslide, winning 65% of the vote.

==== Candidates ====
- Lisa Fricke, incumbent Board member
- Robert Anthony, real estate agent

==== Primary election results ====
Nonpartisan primary results
Party	Candidate	Votes	%
Nonpartisan	Lisa Fricke (inc.)	39,330	70.42%
Nonpartisan	Robert Anthony	16,516	29.58%
Total votes		55,846	100.00%

==== General election results ====
Nonpartisan primary results
Party	Candidate	Votes	%
Nonpartisan	Lisa Fricke (inc.)	71,932	64.64%
Nonpartisan	Robert Anthony	39,335	35.36%
Total votes		111,267	100.00%

=== District 3 ===
Incumbent Board member Rachel Wise declined to seek another term. To replace her, Norfolk Public School Board member Patti Gubbels and Columbus Public School Board member Mike Goos ran. Gubbels defeated Goos in a landslide, winning 66% of the vote.

==== Candidates ====
- Patti S. Gubbels, Norfolk Public School Board member
- Mike Goos, Columbus Public School Board member

==== Primary election results ====
Nonpartisan primary results
Party	Candidate	Votes	%
Nonpartisan	Patti S. Gubbels	32,050	69.75%
Nonpartisan	Mike Goos	13,895	30.25%
Total votes		45,945	100.00%

==== General election results ====
Nonpartisan primary results
Party	Candidate	Votes	%
Nonpartisan	Patti S. Gubbels	54,199	66.11%
Nonpartisan	Mike Goos	27,796	33.89%
Total votes		81,995	100.00%

=== District 4 ===
Incumbent Board member John Witzel declined to seek another term. Tax attorney Jacquelyn Morrison and Midland University professor Adrian Petrescu, who held several positions in the Romanian government in the 1990s, ran to succeed him. Morrison defeated Petrescu in a landslide, winning 74% of the vote.

==== Candidates ====
- Jacquelyn Morrison, tax attorney
- Adrian Petrescu, Midland University professor

==== Primary election results ====
Nonpartisan primary results
Party	Candidate	Votes	%
Nonpartisan	Jacquelyn Morrison	26,474	74.64%
Nonpartisan	Adrian Petrescu	8,988	25.36%
Total votes		35,462	100.00%

==== General election results ====
Nonpartisan primary results
Party	Candidate	Votes	%
Nonpartisan	Jacquelyn Morrison	53,839	74.08%
Nonpartisan	Adrian Petrescu	18,847	25.92%
Total votes		72,686	100.00%

== Board of Regents ==
=== District 1 ===
Incumbent Regent Tim Clare was unopposed for re-election and won his third term uncontested.

==== Candidates ====
- Tim Clare, incumbent Regent

==== Primary election results ====
Nonpartisan primary results
Party	Candidate	Votes	%
Nonpartisan	Tim Clare (inc.)	52,973	100.00%
Total votes		52,973	100.00%

==== General election results ====
Nonpartisan primary results
Party	Candidate	Votes	%
Nonpartisan	Tim Clare (inc.)	94,646	100.00%
Total votes		94,646	100.00%

=== District 2 ===
Incumbent Regent Howard Hawks declined to seek re-election. Psychologist Jack Stark, Millard Public School Board member MiKe Kennedy, and nonprofit manager Viv Ewing ran to replace him. At the nonpartisan primary, Kennedy placed first, winning 35% of the vote, and Stark narrowly edged out Ewing to advance to the general election, winning 34% to Ewing's 32%. However, several months into the general election campaign, Kennedy withdrew from the race, citing a need to focus on his existing service commitments during the COVID-19 pandemic. Though Ewing contemplated a write-in campaign, she ultimately declined to do so and Stark was elected unopposed.

==== Candidates ====
- Jack A. Stark, psychologist
- Mike Kennedy, Millard Public School Board member
- Viv Ewing, nonprofit manager

==== Primary election results ====
Nonpartisan primary results
Party	Candidate	Votes	%
Nonpartisan	Mike Kennedy	20,129	34.91%
Nonpartisan	Jack A. Stark	19,567	33.96%
Nonpartisan	Viv Ewing	18,285	31.72%
Total votes		57,981	100.00%

==== General election results ====
Nonpartisan primary results
Party	Candidate	Votes	%
Nonpartisan	Jack A. Stark	101,098	100.00%
Total votes		101,098	100.00%

== State judiciary ==
Justices Lindsey Miller-Lerman and Jeffrey J. Funke of the Nebraska Supreme Court; Judges Michael W. Pirtle and David Arterburn of the Nebraska Court of Appeals; and Judges Thomas E. Stine and Dirk V. Block of the Nebraska Workers' Compensation Court ran for retention. All were retained.

=== Nebraska Supreme Court ===
==== District 2 ====
Justice Lindsey Miller-Lerman
Choice	Votes	%
For	93,025	74.20
Against	32,350	25.80
Total	125,375	100.00
Source: Nebraska Secretary of State

==== District 5 ====
Justice Jeffrey J. Funke
Choice	Votes	%
For	93,418	78.79
Against	25,152	21.21
Total	118,570	100.00
Source: Nebraska Secretary of State

=== Nebraska Court of Appeals ===
==== District 2 ====
Judge Michael W. Pirtle
Choice	Votes	%
For	84,466	68.66
Against	38,560	31.34
Total	123,026	100.00
Source: Nebraska Secretary of State

==== District 4 ====
Judge David K. Arterburn
Choice	Votes	%
For	94,754	72.18
Against	36,517	27.82
Total	131,271	100.00
Source: Nebraska Secretary of State

=== Nebraska Workers' Compensation Court ===
Judge David K. Arterburn
Choice	Votes	%
For	94,754	72.18
Against	36,517	27.82
Total	131,271	100.00
Source: Nebraska Secretary of State

Judge Thomas E. Stine
Choice	Votes	%
For	564,633	75.59
Against	182,366	24.41
Total	746,999	100.00
Source: Nebraska Secretary of State

== State legislature ==
25 of 49 seats in the Nebraska State Legislature were up for election.

Nebraska Legislature
Party	Before	After	Change
Republican	30	32	▲2
Democratic	18	17	▼1
Independent	1	0	▼1
Total	49	49	

== Ballot measures ==
=== Initiative 428 ===
Nebraska Initiative 428 would cap the annual interest for payday loans at 36%. As of September 2020, the Nebraskan average was 400% APR. Vote for 428, an organisation campaigning for the initiative's passage, released a poll by Benenson Group Strategies which showed support for the measure (among Nebraskan voters) at 67%. It was conducted in August.

Initiative 428
Choice	Votes	%
For	723,521	82.80
Against	150,330	17.20
Total	873,851	100.00
Source: Nebraska Secretary of State

Initiative 428 results by county Yes: 80–90%; 70–80%; 60–70%

=== Initiative 429 ===
Nebraska Initiative 429
- November 3, 2020
- Initiative 429

Results
Choice	Votes	%
Yes	588,405	65.04%
No	316,298	34.96%
Total votes	904,703	100.00%
- Yes 50%–60% 60%–70% 70%–80% No 50%–60% Tie

Nebraska Initiative 429 would allow gambling at licensed racetracks.

Initiative 429
Choice	Votes	%
For	588,405	65.04
Against	316,298	34.96
Total	904,703	100.00
Source: Nebraska Secretary of State

=== Initiative 430 ===
Nebraska Initiative 430
- November 3, 2020
- Initiative 430

Results
Choice	Votes	%
Yes	591,086	65.01%
No	318,094	34.99%
Total votes	909,180	100.00%
- Yes 50%–60% 60%–70% 70%–80% No 50%–60%

Nebraska Initiative 430 would establish the governing commission for racetrack gambling.

Initiative 430
Choice	Votes	%
For	591,086	65.01
Against	318,094	34.99
Total	909,180	100.00
Source: Nebraska Secretary of State

=== Initiative 431 ===
Nebraska Initiative 431
- November 3, 2020
- Initiative 431

Results
Choice	Votes	%
Yes	620,835	68.71%
No	282,703	31.29%
Total votes	903,538	100.00%
- Yes 50%–60% 60%–70% 70%–80% No 50%–60% Tie

Nebraska Initiative 431 would enact taxes on gambling at racetracks.

Initiative 431
Choice	Votes	%
For	620,835	68.71
Against	282,703	31.29
Total	903,538	100.00
Source: Nebraska Secretary of State
