= Duchcov =

- Town
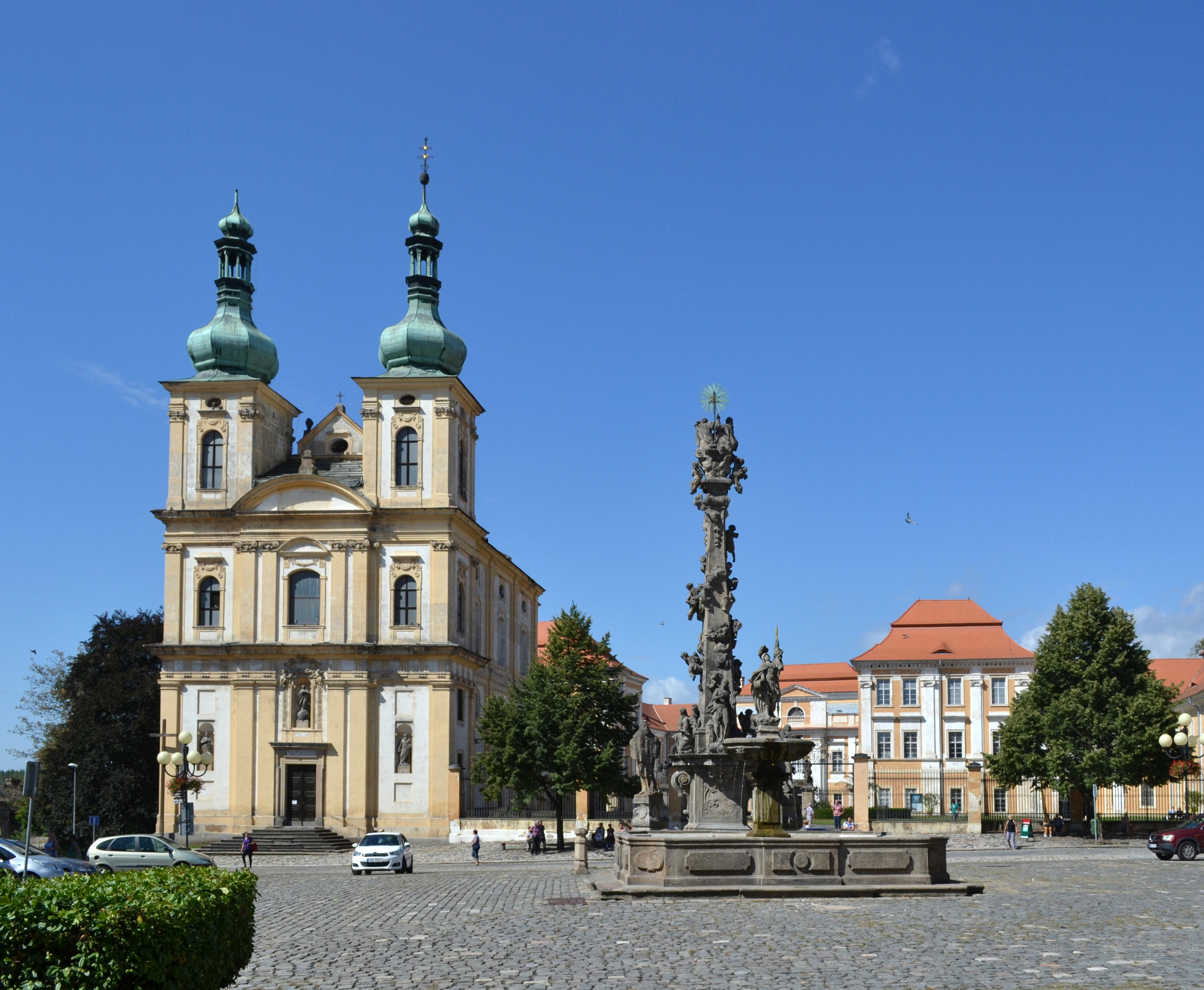
- The square Náměstí Republiky with Duchcov Castle and the Church of the Annunciation

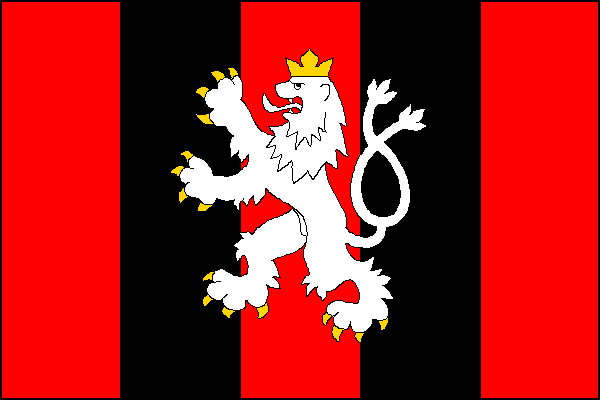
- Flag Coat of arms

- Location in the Czech Republic
- Coordinates: 50°36′14″N 13°44′47″E
- Country: Czech Republic
- Region: Ústí nad Labem
- District: Teplice
- First mentioned: 1207

Government
  - Mayor: Zbyněk Šimbera (SOCDEM)

Area
  - Total: 15.41 km^{2} (5.95 sq mi)
- Elevation: 201 m (659 ft)

Population (2026-01-01)
  - Total: 8,718
  - Density: 565.7/km^{2} (1,465/sq mi)
- Time zone: UTC+1 (CET)
  - Summer (DST): UTC+2 (CEST)
- Postal code: 419 01
- Website: www.duchcov.cz

Duchcov (Czech pronunciation: [ˈduxtsof]; German: Dux) is a town in Teplice District in the Ústí nad Labem Region of the Czech Republic. It has about 8,700 inhabitants. The town is located on the stream Loučeňský potok in the Most Basin.

The most important monument is the Duchcov Castle, which is protected as a national cultural monument. The historic town centre with the castle complex is well preserved and is protected as an urban monument zone.

== Etymology ==
The initial name of the settlement was Hrabišín (in Old Czech written as Grabišin). The name was derived from the surname Hrabiša (Grabiša), meaning "Hrabiša's (court)". After a new town was founded on the site of the village in the first half of the 13th century, it received the new name Duchcov (German: Dux). However, the origin of the name is unclear. It was probably created artificially. In the oldest documents, the name is written as Tokczau and Tokczaw.

== Geography ==
Duchcov is located about 6 kilometres (4 mi) southwest of Teplice and 20 km (12 mi) southwest of Ústí nad Labem. It lies in the Most Basin. The stream Loučeňský potok flows through the town. The town is surrounded by several fishponds and artificial lakes.

== History ==
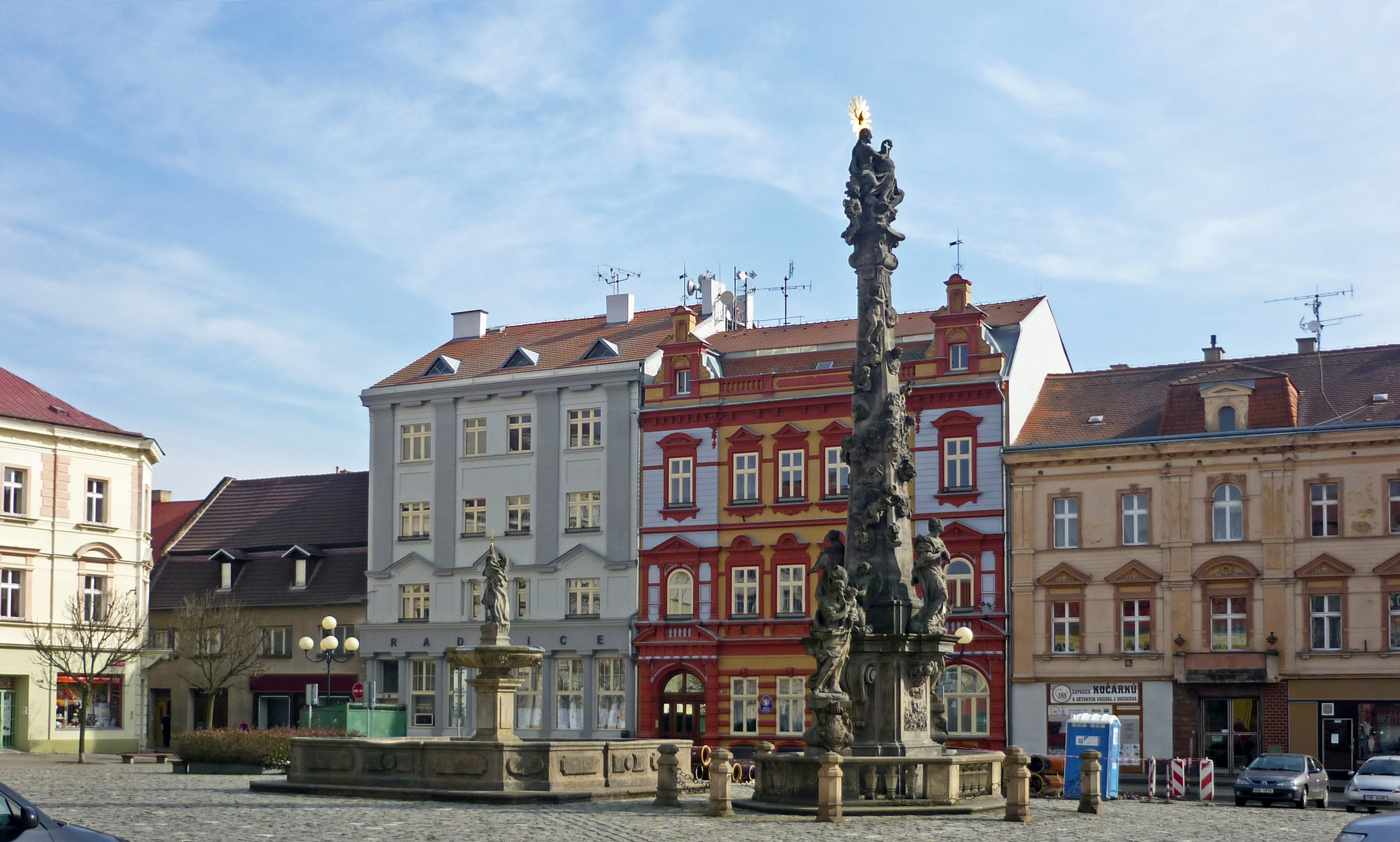
The square Náměstí Republiky

The first written mention of Duchcov is from 1207, referring to the older name Hrabišín. The name of Duchcov is first mentioned in 1240. In the 14th century, Duchcov was a serf town surrounded by walls with three gates. In these times, the Romanesque Church of St. George and the Dominican monastery were in the town. At the turn of the 15th and 16th centuries, Duchcov became the seat of the estate owners, the Kaplíř of Sulevice family, and in the 16th century, the Lobkowicz family acquired Duchcov. By marrying a widow from the Lobkowicz family, the Wallenstein family acquired the town.

A brewery was established in 1675. In 1763, the first coal mine was opened near the town. In the 19th century, Duchcov got industrial character. A sugar factory and a porcelain factory were established. In 1867, the railway was built, which enabled the rapid development of coal mining. Due to the influx of workers from the hinterland, the town with a German majority was transformed into a Czech town.

Until 1918, the town was part of Austria-Hungary. In 1918, Duchcov became a part of independent Czechoslovakia. In 1938, as a result of the Munich Agreement, the town was ceded to Nazi Germany and administered as part of the Reichsgau Sudetenland. In May 1945, after the liberation of Czechoslovakia, Duchcov returned under Czechoslovak administration. The German population was expelled in 1945 and replaced by Czech settlers.

== Demographics ==
Historical population

| Year | Pop. | ±% |
|---|---|---|
| 1869 | 3,532 | — |
| 1880 | 7,689 | +117.7% |
| 1890 | 10,473 | +36.2% |
| 1900 | 12,867 | +22.9% |
| 1910 | 13,207 | +2.6% |

| Year | Pop. | ±% |
|---|---|---|
| 1921 | 13,374 | +1.3% |
| 1930 | 13,806 | +3.2% |
| 1950 | 8,701 | −37.0% |
| 1961 | 9,417 | +8.2% |
| 1970 | 9,988 | +6.1% |

| Year | Pop. | ±% |
|---|---|---|
| 1980 | 10,257 | +2.7% |
| 1991 | 8,913 | −13.1% |
| 2001 | 8,780 | −1.5% |
| 2011 | 8,487 | −3.3% |
| 2021 | 8,506 | +0.2% |

Source: Censuses

== Transport ==
Duchcov is located on the Děčín–Kadaň railway line.

== Sights ==
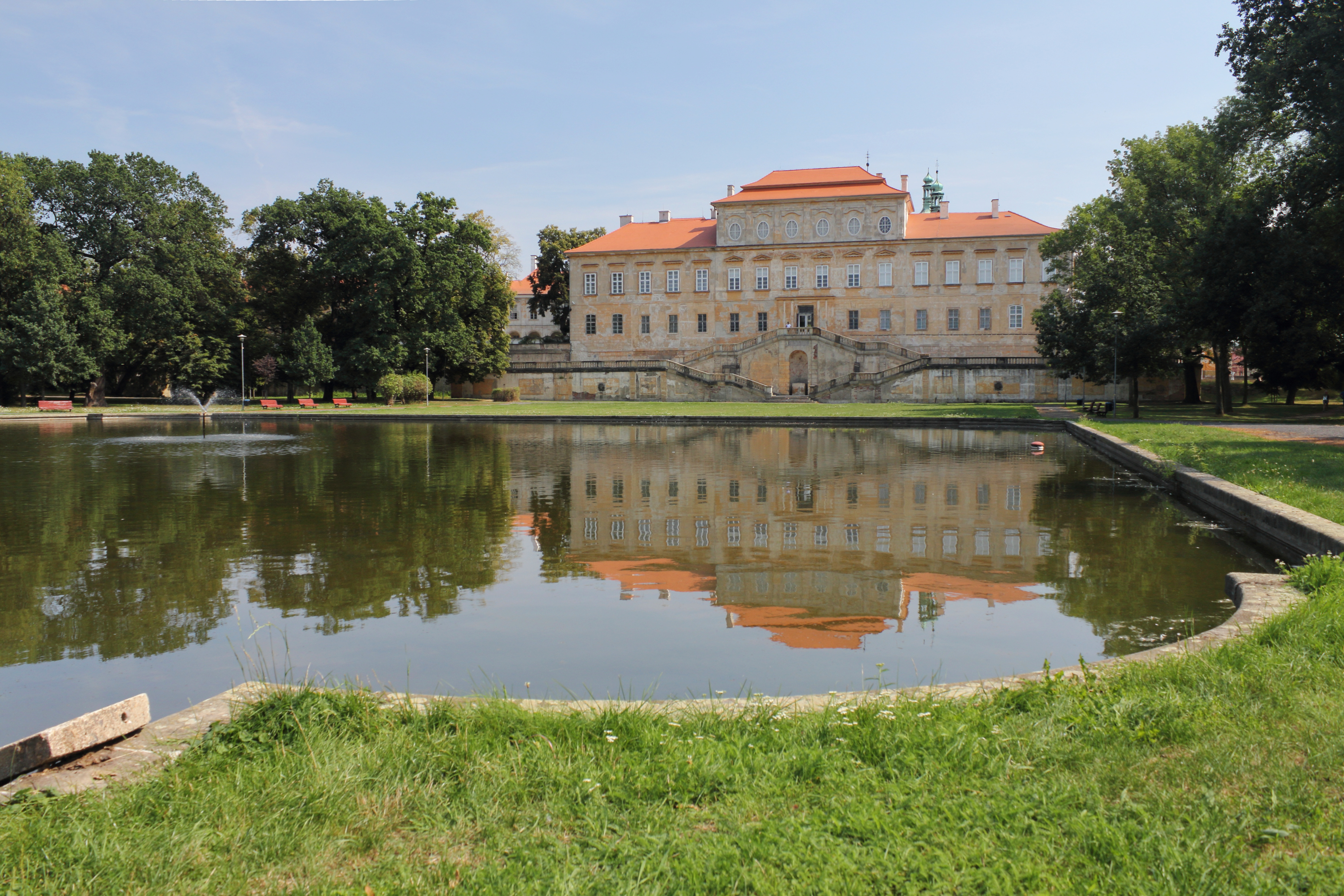
Duchcov Castle

The main landmark of the town is the Duchcov Castle. The castle was built in the 13th century as a fortress and later was rebuilt in the Neoclassical style. It is protected as a national cultural monument. Today the castle is owned by the state. It is open to visitors and offers guided tours.

The Church of the Annunciation is located next to the castle, on the square Náměstí Republiky in the historic centre. It was built in the Baroque style in the 1720s. Other valuable buildings on the square include the fountain with the statue of Saint Florian from 1728 and Column of the Holy Trinity, built in 1750–1760.

== Notable people ==
- Giacomo Casanova (1725–1798), Italian adventurer; lived and died here
- Bohumil Bydžovský (1880–1969), mathematician
- Egon von Jordan (1902–1978), Austrian actor
- Iva Budařová (born 1960), tennis player
- Zuzana Mrázová (born 1978), politician
- Štěpán Vachoušek (born 1979), footballer
- Eva Birnerová (born 1984), tennis player

== Twin towns – sister cities ==
Duchcov is twinned with:

- Miltenberg, Germany
- Mulda, Germany
