= Zuzana Mrázová =

Czech politician (born 1978)

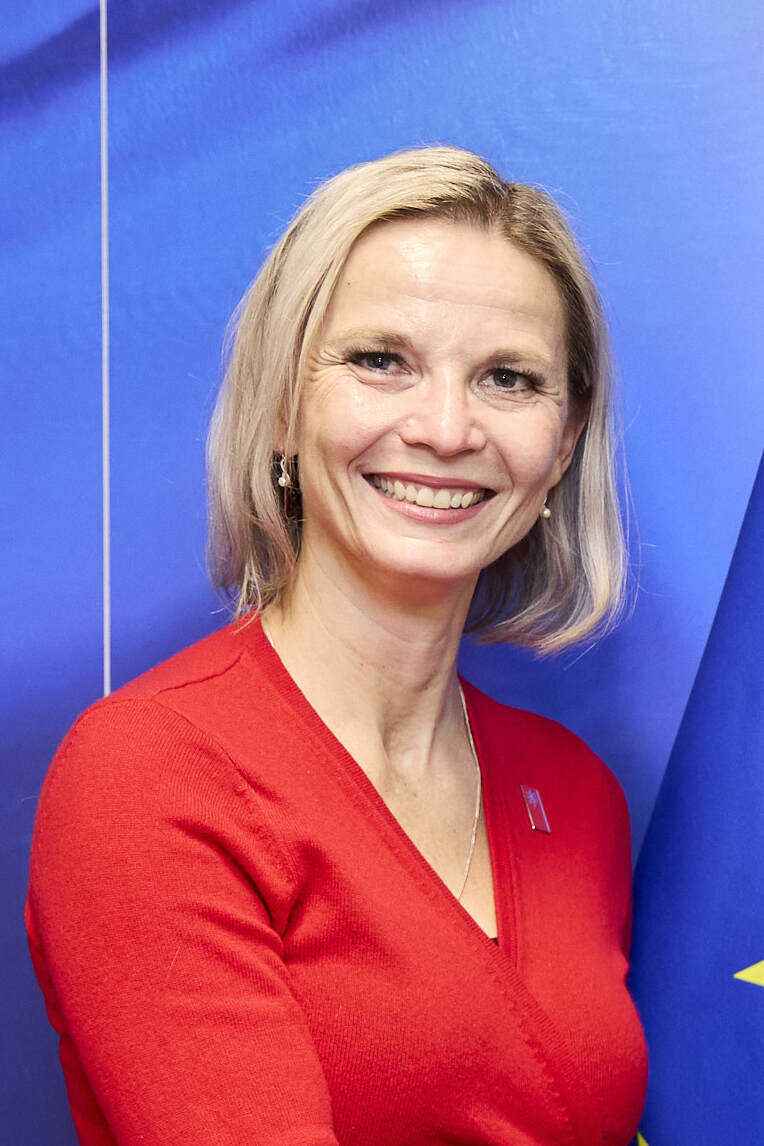
- Mrázová in 2026

Minister of Regional Development
- Incumbent
- Assumed office 15 December 2025
- Prime Minister: Andrej Babiš
- Preceded by: Petr Kulhánek

Member of the Chamber of Deputies
- Incumbent
- Assumed office 4 October 2025
- Constituency: Ústí nad Labem Region

Personal details
- Born: 24 February 1978 (age 48) Duchcov, Czechoslovakia
- Party: ANO 2011
- Education: Charles University

Zuzana Mrázová (formerly Zuzana Schwarz Bařtipánová; born 24 February 1978) is a Czech politician who has served as Minister of Regional Development in the Third cabinet of Andrej Babiš since December 2025 and as a member of the Chamber of Deputies since October 2025. She has served as mayor of Bílina since 2018. She ran for the Czech Senate in the 2020 Teplice by-election, finishing 4th with 9.8% of the vote in the first round.
