= 2020 Delaware elections =

- Turnout: 68.86%

A general election was held in the U.S. state of Delaware on November 3, 2020, concurrently with other nationwide elections, including for President of the United States. Half of Delaware's executive officers were up for election, including the governor, as well as its Class 2 United States Senate seat and at-large seat in the United States House of Representatives. Primary elections were held on September 15, 2020.

== Federal elections ==
=== President ===
2020 United States presidential election in Delaware
Party	Candidate	Votes	%
Democratic	Joe Biden	296,268	58.74
Republican	Donald Trump (incumbent)	200,603	39.77
Libertarian	Jo Jorgensen	5,000	0.99
Green	Howie Hawkins	2,139	0.42
Write-in		336	0.07
Total votes		504,346	100.00
Democratic win			

=== Senate ===
2020 United States Senate election in Delaware
Party	Candidate	Votes	%
Democratic	Chris Coons (incumbent)	291,804	59.44
Republican	Lauren Witzke	186,054	37.90
Independent Party	Mark Turley	7,833	1.59
Libertarian	Nadine Frost	5,244	1.07
Total votes		490,935	100.00
Democratic hold			

=== House of Representatives ===
2020 United States House of Representatives election in Delaware
Party	Candidate	Votes	%
Democratic	Lisa Blunt Rochester (incumbent)	281,382	57.63
Republican	Lee Murphy	196,392	40.22
Independent Party	Catherine S. Purcell	6,682	1.37
Libertarian	David L. Rogers	3,814	0.78
Total votes		488,270	100.00
Democratic hold			

== State elections ==
=== Governor ===
2020 Delaware gubernatorial election
Party	Candidate	Votes	%
Democratic	John Carney (incumbent)	292,903	59.46
Republican	Julianne Murray	190,312	38.63
Independent Party	Kathy DeMatteis	6,150	1.25
Libertarian	John Machurek	3,270	0.66
Total votes		492,635	100.00
Democratic hold			

=== Lieutenant governor ===
2020 Delaware lieutenant gubernatorial election
Party	Candidate	Votes	%
Democratic	Bethany Hall-Long (incumbent)	285,638	59.14
Republican	Donyale Hall	197,343	40.86
Total votes		482,981	100.00
Democratic hold			

=== Insurance commissioner ===
Democratic primary
Party	Candidate	Votes	%
Democratic	Trinidad Navarro (incumbent)	73,847	64.06
Democratic	Kayode Abegunde	41,429	35.94
Total votes		115,276	100.00

2020 Delaware insurance commissioner election
Party	Candidate	Votes	%
Democratic	Trinidad Navarro (incumbent)	286,743	59.48
Republican	Julia M. Pillsbury	195,305	40.52
Total votes		482,048	100.00
Democratic hold			

Results by county Navarro: 50–60%; 60–70%; Pillsbury: 50–60%

=== General Assembly ===
Senate
Party	Before	After	Change
Democratic	12	14	▲2
Republican	9	7	▼2
Total	21	21	

House of Representatives
Party	Before	After	Change
Democratic	26	26	Steady
Republican	15	15	Steady
Total	41	41	
