= Medicaid coverage gap =

Aspect of U.S. public healthcare policy

ACA Medicaid expansion by state: Not adopted Implemented

Under the public healthcare policy of the United States, some people have incomes too high to qualify in their state of residence for Medicaid, the public health insurance plan for those with limited resources, but too low to qualify for the premium tax credits that would subsidize the purchase of private health insurance. These people are described as falling into the Medicaid coverage gap.

The 2010 Affordable Care Act (ACA) aimed to ensure universal health care through a number of mechanisms. It expanded Medicaid by raising the income threshold for eligibility to 138 percent of the federal poverty line (FPL) among nonelderly adults. For those with income above the FPL who do not receive affordable health insurance from an employer, the ACA established premium tax credits that would subsidize the cost of buying private insurance through health insurance marketplaces.

State participation in Medicaid is theoretically voluntary, although all states have participated since 1982. The program is funded jointly by the state and federal governments, though the federal government pays for the vast majority of the ACA expansion; the framers of the ACA assumed that all states would continue to participate in the newly expanded Medicaid, which is why subsidies for private insurance are only available for those with incomes above the FPL. Nevertheless, opponents of the ACA asserted that the federal government's conditioning of continued funding for Medicaid on adoption of expansion was unconstitutionally coercive. The Supreme Court held in National Federation of Independent Business v. Sebelius that adoption of Medicaid expansion by states was effectively optional, and that states could continue with their preexisting Medicaid requirements without risk of defunding. In many of the states that chose to reject the expansion, only those making significantly below the FPL qualify for Medicaid; this has led to a "gap" in coverage for residents of those states with incomes that are too low to qualify for private insurance subsidies and too high to qualify for the non-expanded Medicaid.

As of March 2023, 40 states and the District of Columbia have adopted Medicaid expansion, leaving 10 states that have not. An estimated 1.9 million Americans in those 10 states are within the Medicaid coverage gap according to the Kaiser Family Foundation. Approximately 97 percent of this cohort lives in the Southern U.S., with a majority living in Texas and Florida; Texas has the largest population of people in the cohort, accounting for 41 percent of people in the coverage gap.

== Medicaid expansion ==
As initially passed, the ACA was designed to provide universal health care in the U.S.: those with employer-sponsored health insurance would keep their plans, those with middle-income and lacking employer-sponsored health insurance could purchase subsidized insurance via newly established health insurance marketplaces, and those with low-income would be covered by the expansion of Medicaid. However, the U.S. Supreme Court ruling in National Federation of Independent Business v. Sebelius (2012) rendered state adoption of Medicaid expansion optional. Governors in several Republican-leaning states announced that they would not expand Medicaid in response, leading to a gap in insurance coverage. The Medicaid coverage gap includes nonelderly people with incomes that are below the federal poverty line (FPL), making them ineligible for subsidized marketplace insurance under the Affordable Care Act (ACA), but have incomes higher than their state's limit for Medicaid eligibility as their state has not adopted Medicaid expansion as prescribed by the ACA. The gap also includes childless adults who are ineligible for Medicaid regardless of income in these states (with the exception of Wisconsin, which permits Medicaid coverage via waiver).

As of March 2023, an estimated 1.9 million people are in the Medicaid coverage gap, residing in Alabama, Florida, Georgia, Kansas, Mississippi, South Carolina, Tennessee, Texas, Wisconsin, and Wyoming. Out of the cohort, 97 percent live in the Southern United States where most of the non-expansion states are located, with Texas, Florida, and Georgia accounting for nearly three-quarters of the Medicaid coverage gap. Childless adults account for 76 percent of the coverage gap, and people of color account for around 61 percent of the cohort. Within the ten states that have not opted for Medicaid expansion, the median income limit for eligibility in the traditional Medicaid program is 38 percent of the FPL. (Note: As of 2023, this corresponds to an annual income of $9,447 for parents in a family of three. In Texas, the state with the most stringent requirements, the income limit was $3,977 for parents in a family of three.) The uninsured rate within the non-expansion states was 15.4 percent in March 2023 compared to 8.1 percent in expansion states.

Medicaid expansion by state
Subdivision	Status	Implemented
Alabama	Not adopted	—N/a
Alaska	Implemented	September 1, 2015
Arizona	Implemented	January 1, 2014
Arkansas	Implemented	January 1, 2014
California	Implemented	January 1, 2014
Colorado	Implemented	January 1, 2014
Connecticut	Implemented	January 1, 2014
Delaware	Implemented	January 1, 2014
District of Columbia	Implemented	January 1, 2014
Florida	Not adopted	—N/a
Georgia	Not adopted	—N/a
Hawaii	Implemented	January 1, 2014
Idaho	Implemented	January 1, 2020
Illinois	Implemented	January 1, 2014
Indiana	Implemented	February 1, 2015
Iowa	Implemented	January 1, 2014
Kansas	Not adopted	—N/a
Kentucky	Implemented	January 1, 2014
Louisiana	Implemented	July 1, 2016
Maine	Implemented	January 10, 2019
Maryland	Implemented	January 1, 2014
Massachusetts	Implemented	January 1, 2014
Michigan	Implemented	April 1, 2014
Minnesota	Implemented	January 1, 2014
Mississippi	Not adopted	—N/a
Missouri	Implemented	October 1, 2021
Montana	Implemented	January 1, 2016
Nebraska	Implemented	October 1, 2020
Nevada	Implemented	January 1, 2014
New Hampshire	Implemented	August 15, 2014
New Jersey	Implemented	January 1, 2014
New Mexico	Implemented	January 1, 2014
New York	Implemented	January 1, 2014
North Carolina	Implemented	December 1, 2023
North Dakota	Implemented	January 1, 2014
Ohio	Implemented	January 1, 2014
Oklahoma	Implemented	July 1, 2021
Oregon	Implemented	January 1, 2014
Pennsylvania	Implemented	January 1, 2015
Rhode Island	Implemented	January 1, 2014
South Carolina	Not adopted	—N/a
South Dakota	Implemented	July 1, 2023
Tennessee	Not adopted	—N/a
Texas	Not adopted	—N/a
Utah	Implemented	January 1, 2020
Vermont	Implemented	January 1, 2014
Virginia	Implemented	January 1, 2019
Washington	Implemented	January 1, 2014
West Virginia	Implemented	January 1, 2014
Wisconsin	Not adopted	—N/a
Wyoming	Not adopted	—N/a

Uninsured rates in the U.S.

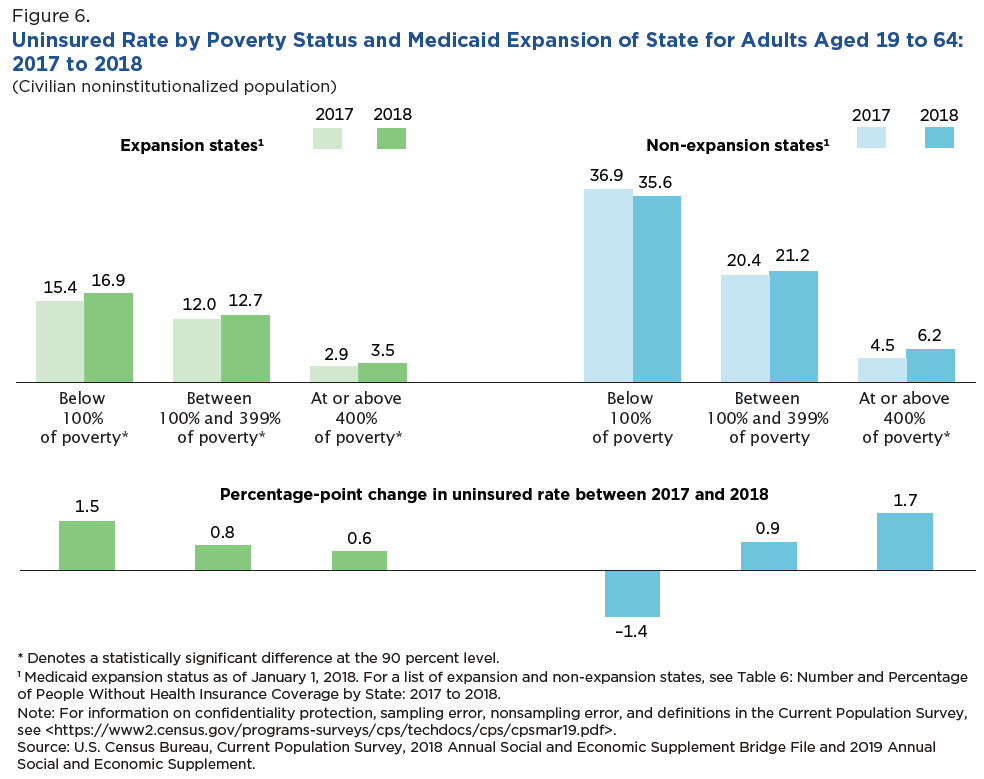
Comparison of uninsured rates between states based on their Medicaid expansion participation in 2017 and 2018

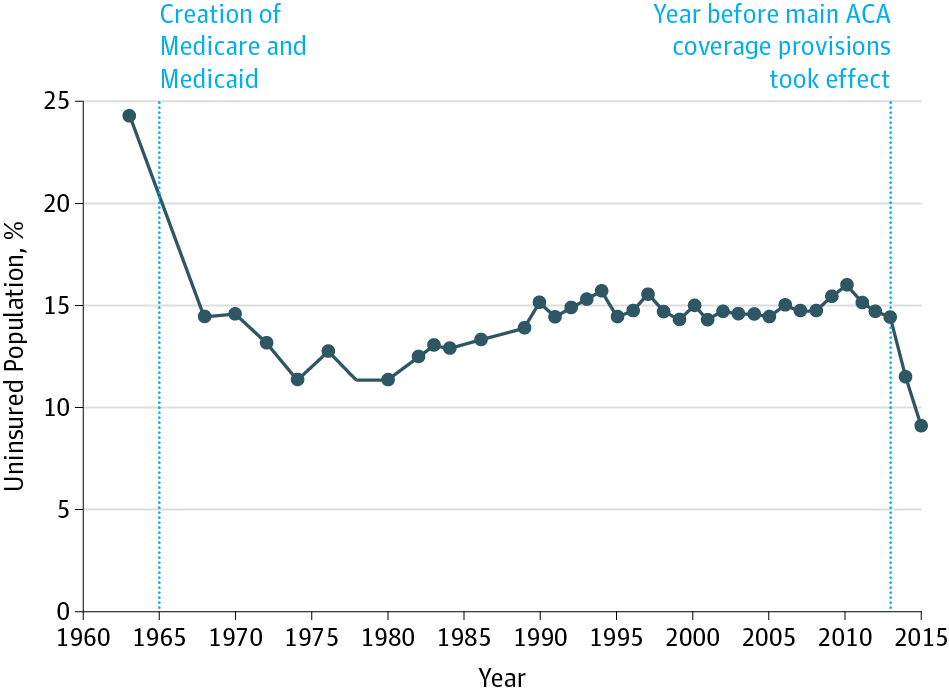
Percentage of individuals in the U.S. without health insurance between 1963–2015

=== Affordable Care Act provision ===
Prior to passage of the ACA, Medicaid did not extend general eligibility to low-income adults without child dependents, though the federal government could authorize waivers for states to expand medicaid coverage; by 2012, eight states provided full Medicaid benefits to this group. The Medicaid statute also permitted states to cover some cohorts (termed "optional eligibility groups") without a permit. However, some states set stringent income eligibility thresholds well below the federal poverty level (FPL) for caretakers and parents of minors. In line with its previous efforts to curtail the expansion of the State Children’s Health Insurance Program, the Bush administration imposed additional restrictions on states attempting to raise the income cap for Medicaid eligibility in 2008. Healthcare reform was a key issue in campaigns for the 2008 United States presidential election. A poll of delegates conducted by The New York Times and CBS News found that 94 percent of Democratic delegates viewed expanding healthcare coverage to all Americans as more important than lowering taxes, compared to 7 percent for Republican delegates.

The ACA was signed into law in March 2010 by President Barack Obama after passing with narrow majorities in the House and Senate on nearly party lines. Softening the eligibility requirements for Medicaid was a central goal of the ACA, forming a two-pronged policy along with subsidized private insurance via health insurance marketplaces to expand health insurance coverage in the U.S. The Medicaid expansion provision of the ACA allowed states to lower the income requirements for Medicaid eligibility, extending eligibility to non-pregnant adults under the age of 65 and not entitled to Medicare with incomes of up to 138 percent of the federal poverty level. (Note: As of 2023, this corresponds to an individual income of $20,120. The statutory income requirement for Medicaid expansion was 133 percent and based on modified adjusted gross income (MAGI). Combining the 133 percent threshold with the statutory 5 percent income disregard under ACA results in a 138 percent effective income threshold.) Within this cohort were three primary categories of adults: adults without dependent children, parents with dependent children, and adults with disabilities. The ACA sought to eliminate categorical criteria barring these groups from Medicaid eligibility and standardize requirements across states. The expansion provision also stipulated that the federal government would cover an enhanced share of the additional Medicaid expenditure incurred by states as a result of Medicaid expansion. The expansion was to be enacted 2014, with the federal government funding 100 percent of states' costs through 2016 and then gradually declining its share stepwise to 90 percent in 2020 and onwards. The ACA granted federal support to states classified as "expansion states" based on the following requirements:

...a State is an expansion state if, on the date of the enactment of the Patient Protection and Affordable Care Act, the State offers health benefits coverage statewide to parents and nonpregnant, childless adults whose income is at least 100 percent of the poverty line, that is not dependent on access to employer coverage, employer contribution, or employment and is not limited to premium assistance, hospital-only benefits, a high deductible health plan, or alternative benefits under a demonstration program authorized under section 1938.

— 111th United States Congress, Patient Protection and Affordable Care Act

The Congressional Budget Office (CBO) estimated that Medicaid expansion under ACA as originally passed would cover 17 million uninsured Americans by 2022. The newly covered adult population in participating states were required to receive health coverage under an Alternative Benefit Plan (ABP) comparable or equivalent to either the state's traditional Medicaid package or a benchmark plan chosen by the state, with mandatory coverage in ten categories of health benefits deemed essential by the ACA. Those deemed medically frail would be given the option of choosing either the ABP or the traditional benefit package. The ABP would also cover screening and diagnostic and treatment services for enrollees younger than 21 years. While Medicaid expansion was to come into force in 2014, the ACA also provided states the option to expand Medicaid early and receive matching funds from the federal government in raising the income cap for Medicaid as prescribed by ACA. States could also receive matching funds by expanding Medicaid early through other mechanisms and obtaining a Section 1115 waiver.

=== National Federation of Independent Business v. Sebelius (2012) ===
Although Medicaid expansion under ACA was a de jure voluntary initiative for states, it was intended to be implemented nationally. Opponents of the legislation described the conditioning of the increased funding for Medicaid on states opting into expansion as unconstitutionally coercive, making Medicaid expansion effectively mandatory. The federal government typically covered only 50–83 percent of Medicaid costs prior to ACA, with its share determined by the state's average per capita income. The elevated share for Medicaid expansion implied over $500 billion in additional federal funding between 2014 and 2020. In National Federation of Independent Business, the plaintiffs challenged the constitutionality of the ACA and contended that the Medicaid expansion provision was coercive. The U.S. District Court for the Northern District of Florida ruled in favor of the federal government on Medicaid expansion, and this ruling was upheld 2–1 in the U.S. Court of Appeals for the Eleventh Circuit. While the Supreme Court largely upheld the constitutionality of the ACA, the court ruled in a 7–2 decision that the Medicaid expansion provision was unconstitutionally coercive. The court established that the federal government could not condition funding for a preexisting program (i.e. Medicaid) on state participation in what the court classified as a new program (i.e. Medicaid expansion). However, the court also ruled 5–4 that Medicaid expansion without the federal threat of defunding Medicaid in non-compliant states fell within the powers afforded by the Spending Clause to Congress. Adoption of Medicaid expansion by individual states was effectively optional as a result of National Federation of Independent Business. States opting out of Medicaid expansion could continue with their preexisting Medicaid requirements without the risk of federal defunding while states accepting the enhanced federal funding would be required to participate in Medicaid expansion. In July 2012, the CBO revised its projection of Americans covered by Medicaid expansion by 2022 to 11 million as a result of the ruling.

When the ACA fully came into effect in January 2014, 24 states and the District of Columbia adopted Medicaid expansion. (Note: Arizona, California, Colorado, Connecticut, Delaware, Hawaii, Illinois, Iowa, Kentucky, Maryland, Massachusetts, Minnesota, Nevada, New Jersey, New York, North Dakota, Ohio, Rhode Island, Vermont, Washington, and West Virginia adopted Medicaid expansion concurrent with the enactment of the ACA on January 1, 2014.) Most states implemented Medicaid expansion via expansion of their Medicaid programs while some states did so by other means such as the use of health savings accounts. The incongruous adoption of Medicaid expansion was a result of several factors, including partisanship and pressure from private insurance stakeholders. Primarily Republican resistance to Medicaid expansion prevented adoption of the provision in other states, with opponents characterizing expansion as an overreach of the federal government into a free market space and arguing that expansion would raise healthcare costs and lower coverage quality. The American Rescue Plan Act of 2021, which passed in March 2021, compelled the federal government to cover an additional 5 percent of state expenditure incurred by Medicaid expansion atop the 90 percent stipulated by ACA to incentivize the then-12 non-expansion states to adopt Medicaid expansion, in addition to Missouri and Oklahoma which had adopted but not implemented expansion at the time. As of March 2023, 40 states and the District of Columbia have adopted Medicaid expansion while 10 have not.

== States adopting Medicaid expansion after ACA enactment ==
=== Maine ===
On November 16, 2012, Governor of Maine Paul LePage declared that he would not be implementing Medicaid expansion in Maine; at the time, Medicaid expansion in his state would expand health coverage to 37,000 people. Proponents for expansion in Maine argued that it would bolster rural hospitals and create new jobs; opponents cited previous problems with the state budget following earlier expansions of Medicaid in the state prior to the ACA LePage remained a stalwart objector of Medicaid expansion thereafter, asserting that expansion would divert funds from other state programs and often summarizing his stance as "free is expensive to somebody." He vetoed five Medicaid expansion bills passed by the Maine legislature between 2013 and 2017.

On October 13, 2016, Maine Equal Justice Partners, a progressive advocacy group, announced that it would begin canvassing for signatures to hold a referendum on Medicaid expansion in the state. Maine Equal Justice Partners stated that over 65,000 signatures were collected on Election Day in 2016, enough to place Medicaid expansion on the ballot in a subsequent election. Expansion of Medicaid was introduced to the ballot for the November 2017 election as Question 2. Around $2 million was spent on campaigning in support of the ballot measure compared to less than $300,000 for opposition to the measure. Question 2 passed with 59 percent of the vote, making Maine the first state to approve Medicaid expansion by ballot measure. Support was strongest in southern and coastal Maine. At the time of passage, the expanded eligibility for Medicaid would encompass 70,000 more adults. Passage of the measure compelled the state to enact expansion legislation 30 days after finalization of the election results and submit its expansion plan to the United States Department of Health and Human Services (HHS) within 90 days of legislative enactment.

Despite the successful ballot initiative, LePage indicated that Medicaid expansion would not be implemented until the state legislature was able to fund Maine's share of the expansion without increasing taxes, using the state's rainy day fund, or curtailing services for the elderly and disabled. Sara Gideon, the Speaker of the Maine House of Representatives, responded by stating that "Any attempts to illegally delay or subvert [expansion legislation]" would "be fought with every recourse at our disposal." The Maine legislature failed to overturn LePage's veto of the accompanying legislation in July 2018. Maine Equal Justice Partners sued to force the LePage administration to accept federal funding for Medicaid expansion, resulting in an order from the Kennebec County Superior Court compelling LePage to submit an expansion plan to the HHS. However, LePage continued to defy Medicaid expansion, stating that he would “go to jail" before implementing Medicaid expansion without prior appropriation of state funding; his administration appealed the court order to the Maine Supreme Judicial Court, which dismissed the appeal in August 2018. The administration filed the requisite documents for Medicaid expansion to the federal government the following month, but LePage concurrently wrote a letter encouraging CMS to reject expansion in Maine. Maine Equal Justice Partners subsequently filed suit against the administration in the Maine Business and Consumer Court, seeking to rescind portions of Maine's Medicaid expansion application that asked the federal government to deny expansion.

Janet Mills won the 2018 Maine gubernatorial election; Mills had campaigned on Medicaid expansion and stated the expansion would be implemented immediately at the start of her governorship following LePage's departure. The outgoing administration continued to stall expansion of Medicaid; following another legal challenge, the Maine Superior Court set February 1, 2019, as the start date for enrollments into expanded Medicaid. Shortly after taking office, Mills signed an executive order on January 3, 2019, directing the expansion of Medicaid and opening enrollments for the program. Medicaid expansion was implemented in Maine on January 10, 2019, with coverage provided to those eligible retroactive to July 2018.

=== Oklahoma ===
Results by county for State Question 802 (2020) in Oklahoma: For 60–70% 50–60% / Against 70–80% 60–70% 50–60%

Following the Supreme Court's ruling in National Federation of Independent Business in 2012, Oklahoma Governor Mary Fallin stated she was skeptical of Medicaid expansion in Oklahoma but would assess the possibility. Fallin later put off the decision until after the 2012 election. Tom Coburn, the junior U.S. senator from Oklahoma, wrote a letter to Fallin in October 2012 warning against expanding the state's Medicaid program. On November 19, 2012, Fallin announced that the state would not be moving forward with Medicaid expansion, citing high costs and the resulting need for budget cuts to other government programs.

In 2016, Fallin and Nico Gomez, the executive director of the Oklahoma Health Care Authority (OHCA), proposed creating a subsidized private option for the Medicaid coverage gap administered through the OHCA's Insure Oklahoma program, mitigating expansion of Medicaid. Termed the "Medicaid Rebalancing Act of 2020", the plan was to be partly federally funded. However, the proposal lost momentum in the Oklahoma Senate following increasing opposition and was tabled without a vote; Gomez, who championed the proposal, resigned in August 2016.

In December 2018, in the wake of the 2018 midterm elections, Democrats in the Oklahoma House of Representatives announced that they would legislatively push for Medicaid expansion. A grassroots effort to put forth a Medicaid expansion ballot initiative began in April 2019 as opposition from Republican legislators and newly elected governor Kevin Stitt made expansion via the legislature unlikely. The conservative think tank Oklahoma Council of Public Affairs challenged the proposal in the Oklahoma Supreme Court, arguing that the language of the associated petition was inaccurate and that the proposed policy was unconstitutional; the court ruled in June 2019 that the petition could continue collecting signatures. Canvassing to qualify the initiative on the ballot began on July 31, 2019. The ballot initiative campaign submitted 313,677 signatures to the Oklahoma Secretary of State in October 2019, exceeding the 178,000 needed to place the measure on the ballot and setting a state record for signatures collected for an initiative petition.

As canvassing for the ballot initiative was ongoing, a bipartisan legislative working group intended to address Medicaid expansion and healthcare coverage began convening and regularly meeting. Both Stitt and the working group sought to devise alternatives to the Medicaid expansion outlined by the initiative. Stitt unveiled his proposal, dubbed SoonerCare 2.0, in March 2020; the plan involved expansion of the state's Medicaid program including work requirements and tiered monthly premiums and copays. His plan was to serve as the state's use of CMS's Healthy Adult Opportunity program with an anticipated rollout in July 2020. The ballot initiative appeared on the ballot for the 2020 primaries as State Question 802, with support from several health organizations and Native American tribes in the state. The measure passed by less than a percentage-point margin, compelling the state to implement Medicaid expansion by July 1, 2021. Stitt withdrew his healthcare proposal following passage of the initiative.

=== South Dakota ===
Results by county for Constitutional Amendment D (2022) in South Dakota: For 80–90% 70–80% 60–70% 50–60% / Against 60–70% 50–60%

The Republican-controlled South Dakota Legislature long opposed Medicaid expansion. Proponents of Medicaid expansion in the state emphasized the benefits to healthcare access and rural hospitals, particularly in the aftermath of the COVID-19 epidemic, while critics argued that expanding Medicaid would be fiscally irresponsible, lead to tax increases, and discourage able-bodied adults from seeking work. In October 2014, telephone poll conducted by Mason-Dixon Polling & Strategy of 800 registered voters in the state found that respondents supported Medicaid expansion as outlined in ACA by a 45–37 percent margin, with an additional 18 percent of respondents undecided. In 2015, South Dakota Governor Dennis Daugaard proposed extending Medicaid coverage to 55,000 residents and raising health spending for Native Americans. However, a deal could not be reached between the state and the U.S. Department of Health and Human Services before the end of then-President Obama's term.

A coalition of advocacy groups, including Dakotans for Health, began canvassing for signatures in 2021 to place a constitutional amendment to expand Medicaid on the ballot for the 2022 election. The state legislature drafted a resolution that would put to vote a constitutional amendment requiring subsequent ballot measures to garner 60 percent of the vote if the measure created new taxes or required more than $10 million in state appropriations within the first five years of enactment. In March 2021, the South Dakota Senate voted to expedite voting on the measure, moving it from the 2022 general election to the 2022 primaries. The associated amendment was added to the ballot for the 2022 primaries as Constitutional Amendment C. Supporters of Medicaid expansion viewed passage of Amendment C as an attempt to prevent Medicaid expansion from passing via ballot initiative; Dakotans for Health unsuccessfully challenged the resolution in the South Dakota Supreme Court in May 2021. Medicaid expansion was placed on the 2022 general election ballot as Constitutional Amendment D after garnering 38,244 signatures.

Concurrently, Republican State Senator Wayne Steinhauer introduced a proposal to the South Dakota Legislature to expand Medicaid, arguing that the wording of Amendment D was not desirable and proposing withdrawal of the ballot measure if his bill was passed. His Republican colleagues argued that expanding the program would expand the government and pull funding away from public schools. The Republican-led South Dakota Senate voted against the proposal by a 12–13 vote on February 15, 2022. Amendment C later failed by a 67.4–32.6 percentage point margin in the 2022 primary election, ensuring that Amendment D could pass by majority vote. Governor Kristi Noem opposed Medicaid expansion, but stated in a September 2022 debate for the 2022 gubernatorial election that Medicaid expansion would be implemented if passed by ballot initiative, provided that it was "written constitutionally." Amendment D passed by a 12.4-percentage point margin, with 56.2 percent of voters supporting the measure. The passage of Constitutional Amendment D set into motion the expansion of Medicaid to 42,500 new adult and nonelderly South Dakotans by July 1, 2023. People within the Medicaid coverage gap are expected to account for approximately a third of the newly eligible population. The state Department of Social Services estimated that 52,000 people would enroll in the expanded program.

=== Utah ===
Medicaid expansion in Utah remained an undecided issue in the state government in the aftermath of NFIB v. Sebelius. The Republican-controlled state legislature was staunchly opposed to Medicaid expansion due to its costs and distrust of the federal government. While Governor Gary Herbert elected to wait for an independent analysis of Medicaid expansion to make a decision, Republican lawmakers sought to pass a bill prohibiting Medicaid expansion without approval from the state legislature; the Utah House of Representatives approved the bill by a 46–27 vote on March 11, 2013.

Medicaid expansion in Utah took effect on January 1, 2020.

== See also ==
- Medicaid
- Medicaid estate recovery
- Patient Protection and Affordable Care Act
