= Missouri Amendment 2 =

Missouri Amendment 2 or Missouri Constitutional Amendment 2 can refer to multiple amendments to the state constitution in Missouri:

- 2004 Missouri Amendment 2, a successful amendment to prevent same-sex marriage
- 2006 Missouri Amendment 2, a successful amendment to allow stem-cell research
- 2020 Missouri Amendment 2, a successful amendment to expand Medicaid
