= 2024 Missouri Amendment 7 =

- November 5, 2024

Results
Choice	Votes	%
Yes	1,966,852	68.44%
No	906,851	31.56%

Yes
90–100%
80–90%
70–80%
60–70%
50–60%
No
90–100%
80–90%
70–80%
60–70%
50–60%
Other
Tie
No votes

2024 Missouri Amendment 7 was a ballot measure to amend the Constitution of Missouri to prohibit ranked-choice voting and affirm the state ban on non-citizen voting. The initiative's vote was held on November 5, 2024 and passed with 68.44% of the vote.

== Contents ==
The amendment appeared on the ballot as follows:

Shall the Missouri Constitution be amended to:

- Make the Constitution consistent with state law by only allowing citizens of the United States to vote;
- Prohibit the ranking of candidates by limiting voters to a single vote per candidate or issue; and
- Require the plurality winner of a political party primary to be the single candidate at a general election?

State and local governmental entities estimate no costs or savings.

== Campaigns ==
The Kansas City Star and the St. Louis Post-Dispatch opposed the initiative.

== Results ==
The measure was approved.

Constitutional Amendment 7
Choice	Votes	%
For	1,966,852	68.44
Against	906,851	31.56
Total	2,873,703	100.00

== See also ==
- List of Missouri ballot measures
