= List of Missouri ballot measures =

The following is a list of statewide initiatives and referendums modifying state law and proposing state constitutional amendments in Missouri, sorted by election.

== 21st century ==
=== 2000 ===
November 2000 general election
Measure name	Description	Result	Yes votes	No votes
Amendment 1	A constitutional amendment creating a reserve fund for use by the governor in budget emergencies with legislative approval.	Passed	1,223,284 (59.16%)	844,303 (40.84%)
Amendment 2	A constitutional amendment reducing the amount of time individuals are required to be members of a licensed organization to participate in the operation of a bingo game.	Failed	672,370 (32.51%)	1,395,873 (67.49%)
Amendment 3	A constitutional amendment requiring salaries for statewide elected officials to be appropriated by the state legislature.	Failed	780,192 (40.90%)	1,127,189 (59.10%)
Proposition A	An initiative prohibiting construction of most new outdoor advertising and restricting existing advertising along highways.	Failed	1,075,333 (48.94%)	1,122,119 (51.06%)
Proposition B	An initiative establishing a public campaign finance system funded by an increased corporate tax.	Failed	748,949 (35.40%)	1,366,559 (64.60%)

=== 2002 ===
August 2002 primary election
Measure name	Description	Result	Yes votes	No votes
Proposition A	A measure allowing the Missouri Office of Administration to charge a fee of up to $0.50 per month for every wireless telephone number to fund wireless enhanced 911 service.	Failed	318,875 (34.69%)	600,274 (65.31%)
Proposition B	A measure increasing sales and use taxes by 0.5 cents and increasing the gas tax by 4 cents per gallon to fund highways and transportation until July 2013.	Failed	255,575 (27.47%)	674,779 (72.53%)

November 2002 general election
Measure name	Description	Result	Yes votes	No votes
Amendment 1	A constitutional amendment allowing the city of St. Louis to amend their charter to reorganize their county functions and offices.	Passed	1,173,822 (69.44%)	516,584 (30.56%)
Amendment 2	An initiated constitutional amendment allowing firefighters, ambulance personnel, and emergency dispatchers to collectively bargain.	Failed	840,493 (48.81%)	881,395 (51.19%)
Amendment 3	A constitutional amendment excluding service of less than half of a legislative term from term limit calculations.	Passed	879,162 (54.27%)	740,941 (45.73%)
Amendment 4	A constitutional amendment allowing joint boards or commissions established by political subdivisions to own joint projects and issue bonds without regulation by the Public Service Commission.	Passed	927,715 (57.77%)	678,137 (42.23%)
Proposition A	An initiative increasing the cigarette tax by 2.75 cents per cigarette ($0.55 per pack) and 20% on other tobacco products to fund healthcare, medical research, smoking prevention, and early childhood education.	Failed	881,701 (49.15%)	912,210 (50.85%)
Constitutional Convention Question	A measure calling for a constitutional convention.	Failed	569,598 (34.55%)	1,079,085 (65.45%)

=== 2004 ===
August 2004 primary election
Measure name	Description	Result	Yes votes	No votes
Amendment 1	An initiated constitutional amendment authorizing floating gambling facilities on the White River in Rockaway Beach, with the revenue being evenly split between teacher salary supplements and capital improvements to schools.	Failed	659,433 (44.13%)	834,943 (55.87%)
Amendment 2	A constitutional amendment prohibiting same-sex marriages from being recognized in Missouri.	Passed	1,055,771 (70.61%)	439,529 (29.39%)

November 2004 general election
Measure name	Description	Result	Yes votes	No votes
Amendment 3	An initiated constitutional amendment allocating all gas tax revenue to highways, roads, and bridges.	Passed	1,966,617 (78.87%)	526,872 (21.13%)

=== 2006 ===
August 2006 primary election
Measure name	Description	Result	Yes votes	No votes
Amendment 1	A constitutional amendment reauthorizing a 0.1% sales and use tax for 10 years to fund state parks and conservation projects.	Passed	485,103 (70.79%)	200,179 (29.21%)

November 2006 general election
Measure name	Description	Result	Yes votes	No votes
Amendment 2	An initiated constitutional amendment allowing any stem cell research permitted under federal law and prohibiting human cloning.	Passed	1,085,396 (51.20%)	1,034,596 (48.80%)
Amendment 3	An initiated constitutional amendment increasing tobacco taxes to fund tobacco prevention programs and provide healthcare for low income Medicaid recipients.	Failed	1,029,027 (48.57%)	1,089,701 (51.43%)
Amendment 6	A constitutional amendment creating a tax exemption for property that is used for nonprofit purposes or activities of veterans' organizations.	Passed	1,237,719 (61.28%)	782,138 (38.72%)
Amendment 7	A constitutional amendment preventing elected officials and judges from receiving a state pension if they are convicted of a felony while in office, removed from office for misconduct, or impeached.	Passed	1,720,007 (84.12%)	324,637 (15.88%)
Proposition B	An initiative increasing the minimum wage to $6.50 per hour and adjusting annually based on the Consumer Price Index.	Passed	1,594,632 (75.97%)	504,294 (24.03%)

=== 2008 ===
November 2008 general election
Measure name	Description	Result	Yes votes	No votes
Amendment 1	A constitutional amendment establishing English as the official language for all governmental meetings.	Passed	2,407,536 (86.31%)	381,874 (13.69%)
Amendment 4	A constitutional amendment limiting grants and loans for stormwater control projects to public water and sewer districts.	Passed	1,494,107 (57.85%)	1,088,728 (42.15%)
Proposition A	An initiative eliminating gambling loss limits, restricting the number of casinos that can be built in the state, and increasing the gambling tax by 1% to provide for public school education.	Passed	1,578,674 (56.17%)	1,231,892 (43.83%)
Proposition B	An initiative creating the Missouri Quality Homecare Council, which would ensure the availability of quality home care services for the elderly and disabled.	Passed	2,077,831 (75.26%)	683,137 (24.74%)
Proposition C	An initiative requiring electric utility companies to generate or purchase at least 15% of their electricity from renewable sources by 2021.	Passed	1,777,500 (66.03%)	914,332 (33.97%)

== 2010s ==
=== 2010 ===
August 2010 primary election
Measure name	Description	Result	Yes votes	No votes
Proposition C	A constitutional amendment prohibiting the government from imposing penalties on people who do not purchase health insurance.	Passed	669,847 (71.07%)	272,723 (28.93%)

November 2010 general election
Measure name	Description	Result	Yes votes	No votes
Amendment 1	A constitutional amendment requiring the office of county assessor to be an elected position in all charter counties except Jackson County.	Passed	1,360,556 (74.12%)	475,000 (25.88%)
Amendment 2	A constitutional amendment exempting all real property used as a homestead by former prisoners of war from property taxes.	Passed	1,227,297 (65.76%)	639,065 (34.24%)
Amendment 3	An initiated constitutional amendment prohibiting any new tax on the sale or transfer of real estate.	Passed	1,592,177 (83.73%)	309,398 (16.27%)
Proposition A	An initiative requiring cities to hold referendums on earnings taxes levied by the city.	Passed	1,297,197 (68.39%)	599,672 (31.61%)
Proposition B	An initiative requiring large-scale dog breeding operations to provide humane treatment and veterinary care and limiting the number of dogs breeders can own.	Passed	997,870 (51.59%)	936,190 (48.41%)

=== 2012 ===
August 2012 primary election
Measure name	Description	Result	Yes votes	No votes
Amendment 2	A constitutional amendment protecting the right to express religious beliefs, allowing children the right to pray in schools, and requiring all public schools to display the Bill of Rights.	Passed	780,567 (82.76%)	162,631 (17.24%)

November 2012 general election
Measure name	Description	Result	Yes votes	No votes
Amendment 3	A constitutional amendment changing the selection of supreme court judges from a nonpartisan process to one that would give the governor more discretion and control over a selecting commission.	Failed	608,458 (23.97%)	1,929,470 (76.03%)
Proposition A	An initiative allowing the city of St. Louis to establish a municipal police force by transferring control of the city's police force from a governor-appointed board of police commissioners to the city.	Passed	1,617,443 (63.89%)	914,143 (36.11%)
Proposition B	An initiative implementing a tax on tobacco products to fund tobacco prevention services in education institutions.	Failed	1,321,586 (49.25%)	1,362,005 (50.75%)
Proposition E	A measure prohibiting the governor from establishing any state-operated health insurance exchange without approval from the legislature or voters.	Passed	1,573,292 (61.71%)	976,250 (38.29%)

=== 2014 ===
August 2014 primary election
Measure name	Description	Result	Yes votes	No votes
Amendment 1	A constitutional amendment establishing a right to farm and ranch.	Passed	499,963 (50.12%)	497,588 (49.88%)
Amendment 5	A constitutional amendment establishing a right to keep and bear arms.	Passed	602,863 (60.95%)	386,308 (39.05%)
Amendment 7	A constitutional amendment increasing the sales tax by 0.75% for ten years to fund transportation projects.	Failed	408,288 (40.82%)	591,932 (59.18%)
Amendment 8	A constitutional amendment allowing the creation of a Veterans Lottery Ticket to fund veterans' services.	Failed	441,520 (45.01%)	539,519 (54.99%)
Amendment 9	A constitutional amendment protecting personal electronic communication and data from unreasonable searches and seizures.	Passed	729,752 (74.75%)	246,515 (25.25%)

November 2014 general election
Measure name	Description	Result	Yes votes	No votes
Amendment 2	A constitutional amendment allowing evidence of prior criminal acts to be admissible in prosecutions for sexual crimes involving a victim under the age of eighteen.	Passed	1,018,773 (71.98%)	396,519 (28.02%)
Amendment 3	An initiated constitutional amendment implementing teacher performance evaluations to determine their employment status and prohibiting teachers from collectively bargaining regarding the implementation of this evaluation system.	Failed	339,422 (23.57%)	1,100,628 (76.43%)
Amendment 6	A constitutional amendment establishing a six day long early voting period.	Failed	416,447 (29.70%)	985,966 (70.30%)
Amendment 10	A constitutional amendment restricting the governor's power to use public funds in the budget without legislative approval.	Passed	791,099 (56.80%)	601,699 (42.20%)

=== 2016 ===
November 2016 general election
Measure name	Description	Result	Yes votes	No votes
Amendment 1	A constitutional amendment reauthorizing a 0.1% sales and use tax for 10 years to fund state parks and conservation projects.	Passed	2,187,773 (79.88%)	551,117 (20.12%)
Amendment 2	An initiated constitutional amendment establishing limits on political campaign contributions.	Passed	1,894,870 (69.95%)	814,016 (30.05%)
Amendment 3	An initiated constitutional amendment increasing cigarette taxes by 60 cents per pack by 2020.	Failed	1,120,389 (40.45%)	1,649,723 (59.55%)
Amendment 4	An initiated constitutional amendment prohibiting new sales/use taxes on any service or transaction not subject to a sales/use tax before 2015.	Passed	1,533,909 (56.98%)	1,158,291 (43.02%)
Amendment 6	A constitutional amendment allowing laws that require the presentation of a voter ID when voting in elections.	Passed	1,712,274 (63.01%)	1,005,234 (36.99%)
Proposition A	An initiative increasing cigarette taxes by 23 cents per pack by 2021.	Failed	1,223,251 (44.81%)	1,506,644 (55.19%)

=== 2018 ===
August 2018 primary election
Measure name	Description	Result	Yes votes	No votes
Proposition A	A referendum enacting a right-to-work law, which would prohibit employers from requiring union membership as a condition of employment.	Failed	453,283 (32.53%)	939,973 (67.47%)

November 2018 general election
Measure name	Description	Result	Yes votes	No votes
Amendment 1	An initiated constitutional amendment changing the process and criteria for redrawing state legislative districts, limiting campaign contributions for state legislative candidates, limiting gifts that state legislators can accept from paid lobbyists, and prohibiting state legislators from serving as paid lobbyists for two years after leaving office.	Passed	1,469,093 (62.02%)	899,613 (37.98%)
Amendment 2	An initiated constitutional amendment legalizing marijuana for medical use and imposing a 4 percent tax on its sale.	Passed	1,583,227 (65.59%)	830,631 (34.41%)
Amendment 3	An initiated constitutional amendment legalizing marijuana for medical use and imposing a 15 percent tax on its sale, which would be used to fund cancer research.	Failed	754,007 (31.50%)	1,639,622 (68.50%)
Amendment 4	A constitutional amendment repealing an unenforceable ban on bingo game advertising and changing the requirements to manage bingo games.	Passed	1,194,304 (52.39%)	1,085,158 (47.61%)
Proposition B	An initiative increasing the minimum wage to $12 per hour by 2023.	Passed	1,499,002 (62.34%)	905,647 (37.66%)
Proposition C	An initiative legalizing marijuana for medical use and imposing a 2 percent tax on its retail sale, which would be used to fund veterans' services, drug treatment, early childhood education, and public safety.	Failed	1,039,251 (43.57%)	1,345,762 (56.43%)
Proposition D	A measure increasing the gas tax by 2.5 cents per gallon annually for 4 years to fund law enforcement.	Failed	1,109,009 (46.40%)	1,281,143 (53.60%)

== 2020s ==
=== 2020 ===
August 2020 primary election
Measure name	Description	Result	Yes votes	No votes
Amendment 2	An initiated constitutional amendment expanding Medicaid eligibility under the Affordable Care Act.	Passed	672,967 (53.25%)	590,809 (46.75%)

November 2020 general election
Measure name	Description	Result	Yes votes	No votes
Amendment 1	A constitutional amendment limiting the governor, lieutenant governor, secretary of state, state treasurer, state auditor, and attorney general to two terms of office.	Failed	1,363,767 (47.16%)	1,527,782 (52.84%)
Amendment 3	A constitutional amendment changing the criteria for redrawing legislative districts, transferring responsibility for legislative redistricting to a governor-appointed bipartisan commission, placing limits on campaign contributions for state senate candidates, and prohibiting state legislators from accepting gifts from paid lobbyists.	Passed	1,489,503 (51.01%)	1,430,358 (48.99%)

=== 2022 ===
November 2022 general election
Measure name	Description	Result	Yes votes	No votes
Amendment 1	A constitutional amendment allowing the state treasurer to invest state funds in municipal securities.	Failed	896,279 (45.68%)	1,065,773 (54.32%)
Amendment 3	An initiated constitutional amendment legalizing recreational marijuana for adults over 21 and imposing a 6 percent tax on its sale.	Passed	1,092,432 (53.10%)	965,020 (46.90%)
Amendment 4	A constitutional amendment allowing the state legislature to increase the minimum funding for certain police forces.	Passed	1,269,826 (63.19%)	739,783 (36.81%)
Amendment 5	A constitutional amendment providing the Missouri National Guard with an executive department separate from the Department of Public Safety.	Passed	1,197,677 (60.22%)	791,231 (39.78%)
Constitutional Convention Question	A measure calling for a constitutional convention.	Failed	633,228 (32.25%)	1,330,427 (67.75%)

=== 2024 ===
August 2024 primary election
Measure name	Description	Result	Yes votes	No votes
Amendment 1	A constitutional amendment exempting childcare facilities from property taxes.	Failed	491,161 (45.28%)	593,465 (54.72%)
Amendment 4	A constitutional amendment allowing the state legislature to increase the minimum funding for certain police forces, which would authorize a law that requires Kansas City to increase funding for the Kansas City Police Department.	Passed	549,919 (51.13%)	525,657 (48.87%)

November 2024 general election
Measure name	Description	Result	Yes votes	No votes
Amendment 2	An initiated constitutional amendment legalizing and regulating sports wagering for adults over 21, allowing license fees and a 10% wagering tax, and allocating revenue towards education.	Passed	1,478,652 (50.05%)	1,475,691 (49.95%)
Amendment 3	An initiated constitutional amendment legalizing abortion before fetal viability.	Passed	1,538,659 (51.60%)	1,443,022 (48.40%)
Amendment 5	An initiated constitutional amendment allowing the Missouri Gaming Commission to issue one additional gambling boat license to operate on the Osage River.	Failed	1,380,949 (47.54%)	1,523,889 (52.46%)
Amendment 6	A constitutional amendment levying costs and fees to fund salaries and benefits for law enforcement personnel.	Failed	1,112,081 (39.39%)	1,711,527 (60.61%)
Amendment 7	A constitutional amendment prohibiting non-citizens from voting in state elections and prohibiting ranked-choice voting.	Passed	1,966,852 (68.44%)	906,851 (31.56%)
Proposition A	An initiative increasing the minimum wage to $15 per hour by 2026 and adjusting it annually based on the CPI, and requiring employers to provide paid sick leave to employees.	Passed (Note: A bill to repeal the annual minimum wage increases and paid sick leave provisions was passed by the state legislature and signed into law by Governor Mike Kehoe on July 10, 2025.)	1,693,064 (57.57%)	1,247,658 (42.43%)

=== 2026 ===
August 2026 primary election
Measure name	Description	Result	Yes votes	No votes
Amendment 1	A constitutional amendment reauthorizing a 0.1% sales and use tax for 10 years to fund state parks and conservation projects.	Passed	1,141,865 (82.29%)	245,778 (17.71%)
Amendment 2	A constitutional amendment requiring the office of county assessor to be an elected position in Jackson County.	Passed	1,042,413 (76.92%)	312,713 (23.08%)
Amendment 4	A constitutional amendment requiring a majority of voters in each congressional district to approve initiative petitions to amend the constitution.	Failed	275,040 (19.68%)	1,122,748 (80.32%)
Amendment 5	A constitutional amendment phasing out the income tax based on revenue growth and authorizing the expansion of sales and use taxes.	Failed	233,309 (16.68%)	1,165,085 (83.32%)

November 2026 general election
Measure name	Description	Result	Yes votes	No votes
Amendment 3	A constitutional amendment prohibiting abortion in most cases and prohibiting gender transition procedures for minors.	Failed	944,084 (44.57%)	1,174,335 (55.43%)
Amendment 6	An initiated constitutional amendment prohibiting the legislature from repealing or amending a citizen initiative unless at least 80% of both the House and Senate vote to refer a proposed change to the ballot, and prohibiting the legislature from making changes to the citizen initiative and referendum process.	Passed	1,253,095 (59.92%)	838,200 (40.08%)
Amendment 7	A constitutional amendment creating a permanent public endowment fund and eliminating state taxes if the fund generates enough revenue to replace them.	Failed	818,054 (39.49%)	1,253,729 (60.51%)
Amendment 8	A constitutional amendment requiring counties to elect a sheriff every four years.	Passed	1,056,289 (51.03%)	1,013,747 (48.97%)
Proposition A	A referendum upholding the new congressional districts adopted by the Missouri General Assembly in 2025.	Failed	788,369 (38.20%)	1,275,558 (61.80%)
