= 1914 Missouri Amendment 13 =

Referendum to grant women the right of suffrage

- November 3, 1914
- Providing that females shall have the same right to vote at all elections held within this state as males.

Results
Choice	Votes	%
Yes	182,257	36.11%
No	322,463	63.89%
County results
Yes
60–70%
50–60%
No
80–90%
70–80%
60–70%
50–60%

1914 Missouri Amendment 13 was a proposed amendment to the 1875 Constitution of Missouri to grant women the right to vote. The ballot measure, which was initiated by the Missouri Equal Suffrage League, was unsuccessful, receiving the support of 13 of the state's 114 counties, and 36.11% of the vote.

== Background ==
The Missouri Equal Suffrage League was the campaign which initiated the measure. After a year-long "vigorous campaign," the group, on June 27, 1914, filed the needed signatures for placing the amendment on the ballot with Secretary of State Cornelius Roach at a ceremony in Jefferson City. The number of signatures submitted, around 31,000, was considered "a large excess over the required number." The amendment, which was the first submitted by initiative that year, had its signatures presented in white pasteboard boxes, which were wrapped in tissue paper and tied with yellow silk ribbon.

== Endorsements ==
Yes

Executive branch officials

- William Jennings Bryan, former secretary of state of the United States (1913–1915) (Democratic)

U.S. Senators

- William J. Stone, Missouri (1903–1918) (Democratic)

U.S. Representatives

- Champ Clark, former speaker of the United States House of Representatives (1911–1919) (Democratic)

Political parties

- Progressive Party (Bull Moose)

Organizations

- American Federation of Labor
- Women's Christian Temperance Union
- Women's Trade Union League

== Contents ==
The amendment, which was decided by voters alongside the 1914 Missouri elections on November 3, 1914, had the following information shown to voters for it:

Thirteenth Proposition.

Proposed by Initiative Petition.

Constitutional Amendment.

Providing that females shall have the same right to vote at all elections held within this state as males.

An act to amend article VIII of the Constitution of the state of Missouri by adding thereto a new section to be known as section 2a, extending the right of suffrage to women.

Be it enacted by the People of the State of Missouri:

Section 1. That article VIII of the Constitution of the state of Missouri be and the same hereby is amended by adding thereto a new section to be known as section 2a, and reading as follows:

Section 2a. Females shall hereafter have the same right, under the same conditions, to vote at all elections held in this state, as males now have or may hereafter have.

Yes

No

== Results ==
13 counties voted in favor, and 101 voted against. The independent city of St. Louis voted against. The highest level of support for the amendment came from Harrison County, with 68.40% in favor, and the lowest level came from Perry County, with 10.88% in favor.

The following table details the results by county of the amendment:

Results by county
County	Yes		No	
County	#	%	#	%
Adair	1,648	45.98	1,936	54.02
Andrew	1,390	46.61	1,592	53.39
Atchison	1,212	49.51	1,236	50.49
Audrain	1,299	34.63	2,452	65.37
Barry	1,265	37.55	2,104	62.45
Barton	1,121	43.96	1,429	56.04
Bates	1,956	46.21	2,277	53.79
Benton	747	31.14	1,652	68.86
Bollinger	352	14.95	2,002	85.05
Boone	2,062	40.01	3,092	59.99
Buchanan	4,712	44.47	5,885	55.53
Butler	1,370	44.44	1,713	55.56
Caldwell	1,304	46.00	1,531	54.00
Callaway	1,422	33.02	2,884	66.98
Camden	522	34.75	980	65.25
Cape Girardeau	1,317	28.20	3,354	71.80
Carroll	2,322	50.48	2,278	49.52
Carter	239	34.00	464	66.00
Cass	1,643	46.04	1,926	53.96
Cedar	928	36.94	1,584	63.06
Chariton	1,160	35.63	2,096	64.37
Christian	786	45.07	958	54.93
Clark	1,066	38.72	1,687	61.28
Clay	1,309	42.76	1,752	57.24
Clinton	1,012	49.98	1,013	50.02
Cole	865	21.03	3,248	78.97
Cooper	950	22.53	3,266	77.47
Crawford	545	29.35	1,312	70.65
Dade	1,125	41.73	1,571	58.27
Dallas	471	28.48	1,183	71.52
Daviess	1,296	39.51	1,984	60.49
DeKalb	1,077	45.58	1,286	54.42
Dent	522	27.90	1,349	72.10
Douglas	700	41.52	986	58.48
Dunklin	1,673	53.79	1,437	46.21
Franklin	916	19.80	3,710	80.20
Gasconade	275	13.00	1,840	87.00
Gentry	1,678	51.07	1,608	48.93
Greene	4,031	41.37	5,713	58.63
Grundy	1,766	57.64	1,298	42.36
Harrison	2,457	68.40	1,135	31.60
Henry	1,658	41.71	2,317	58.29
Hickory	467	40.54	685	59.46
Holt	1,325	49.42	1,356	50.58
Howard	1,047	38.68	1,660	61.32
Howell	1,113	40.64	1,626	59.36
Iron	340	31.42	742	68.58
Jackson	19,256	49.04	20,009	50.96
Jasper	5,680	52.44	5,152	47.56
Jefferson	1,130	25.99	3,217	74.01
Johnson	1,835	41.63	2,573	58.37
Knox	935	38.15	1,516	61.85
Laclede	911	29.59	2,168	70.41
Lafayette	1,840	32.99	3,738	67.01
Lawrence	1,899	44.53	2,366	55.47
Lewis	886	35.53	1,608	64.47
Lincoln	781	29.89	1,832	70.11
Linn	2,406	51.86	2,233	48.14
Livingston	1,806	45.84	2,134	54.16
McDonald	760	41.08	1,090	58.92
Macon	1,660	37.26	2,795	62.74
Madison	385	26.50	1,068	73.50
Maries	273	18.83	1,177	81.17
Marion	1,626	37.74	2,682	62.26
Mercer	1,136	59.66	768	40.34
Miller	703	26.33	1,967	73.67
Mississippi	678	45.41	815	54.59
Moniteau	727	27.41	1,925	72.59
Monroe	933	29.53	2,227	70.47
Montgomery	790	25.18	2,347	74.82
Morgan	477	19.61	1,955	80.39
New Madrid	827	50.67	805	49.33
Newton	1,619	43.76	2,081	56.24
Nodaway	2,576	50.47	2,528	49.53
Oregon	558	34.30	1,069	65.70
Osage	477	19.27	1,998	80.73
Ozark	426	32.57	882	67.43
Pemiscot	1,012	50.65	986	49.35
Perry	299	10.88	2,448	89.12
Pettis	2,808	45.36	3,383	54.64
Phelps	622	26.88	1,692	73.12
Pike	1,509	38.39	2,422	61.61
Platte	837	38.25	1,351	61.75
Polk	1,007	31.87	2,153	68.13
Pulaski	533	33.02	1,081	66.98
Putnam	1,032	45.64	1,229	54.36
Ralls	612	32.89	1,249	67.11
Randolph	1,615	35.31	2,959	64.69
Ray	1,430	41.63	2,005	58.37
Reynolds	402	37.29	676	62.71
Ripley	700	43.10	924	56.90
St. Charles	587	15.19	3,277	84.81
St. Clair	985	37.02	1,676	62.98
St. Francois	2,136	50.28	2,112	49.72
Ste. Genevieve	250	15.26	1,388	84.74
St. Louis	4,375	33.20	8,804	66.80
St. Louis City	26,604	23.96	84,431	76.04
Saline	1,668	38.21	2,697	61.79
Schuyler	668	40.81	969	59.19
Scotland	779	42.50	1,054	57.50
Scott	1,201	45.00	1,468	55.00
Shannon	587	43.16	773	56.84
Shelby	816	33.93	1,589	66.07
Stoddard	1,375	42.11	1,890	57.89
Stone	710	48.73	747	51.27
Sullivan	1,652	47.54	1,823	52.46
Taney	317	38.33	510	61.67
Texas	935	34.04	1,812	65.96
Vernon	1,763	41.58	2,477	58.42
Warren	346	20.46	1,345	79.54
Washington	558	35.34	1,021	64.66
Wayne	717	35.78	1,287	64.22
Webster	703	23.41	2,300	76.59
Worth	808	55.53	647	44.47
Wright	842	30.77	1,894	69.23
Total	182,257	36.11	322,463	63.89

== Later events ==
=== Federal ===
On July 3, 1919, Missouri became the 11 state to ratify the Nineteenth Amendment to the United States Constitution, which granted the right of suffrage to women nationwide. The measure proposing ratification, which was introduced by State Representative Walter E. Bailey, was agreed to by the state house on July 2 in a 125–9 vote. On July 3, the state senate voted in favor with 28 in support, three opposed, one absent, and one not voting.

=== State ===
On November 7, 1922, Missouri voters approved Amendment 2, which formally removed text from the state constitution requiring voters to be "male". The removal of such language was a formality.

== Gallery ==
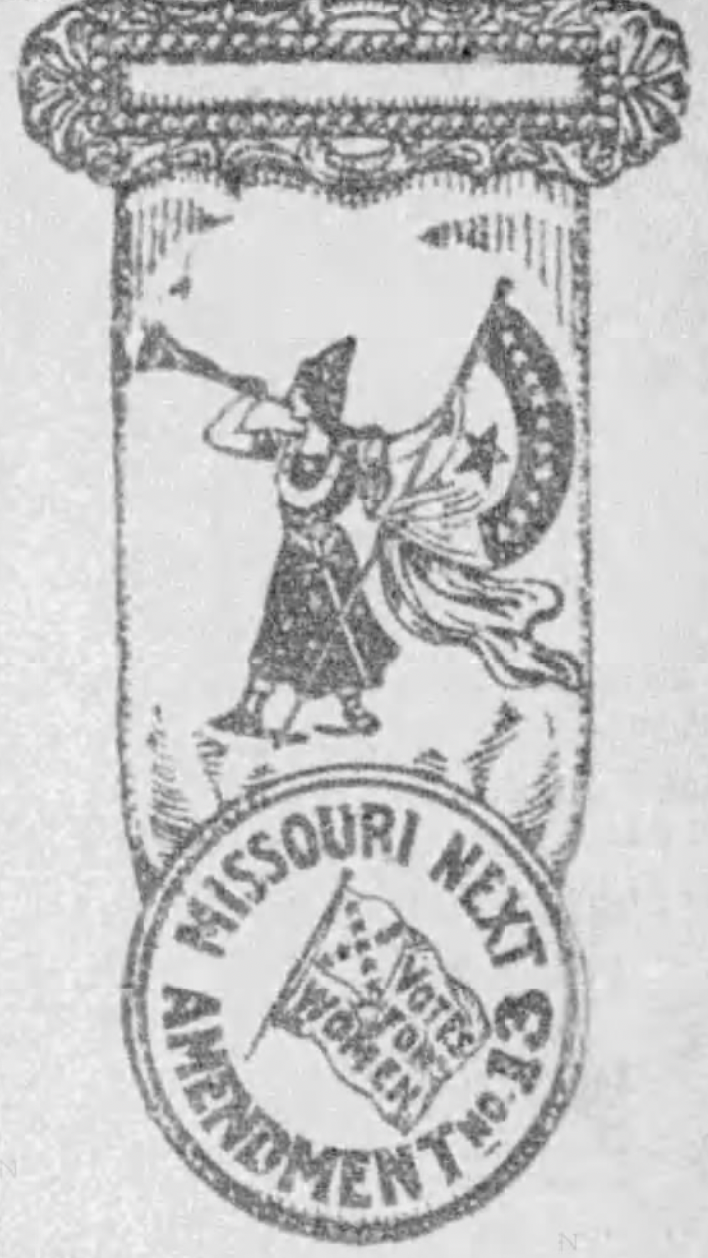
Campaign art supporting passage of Amendment 13

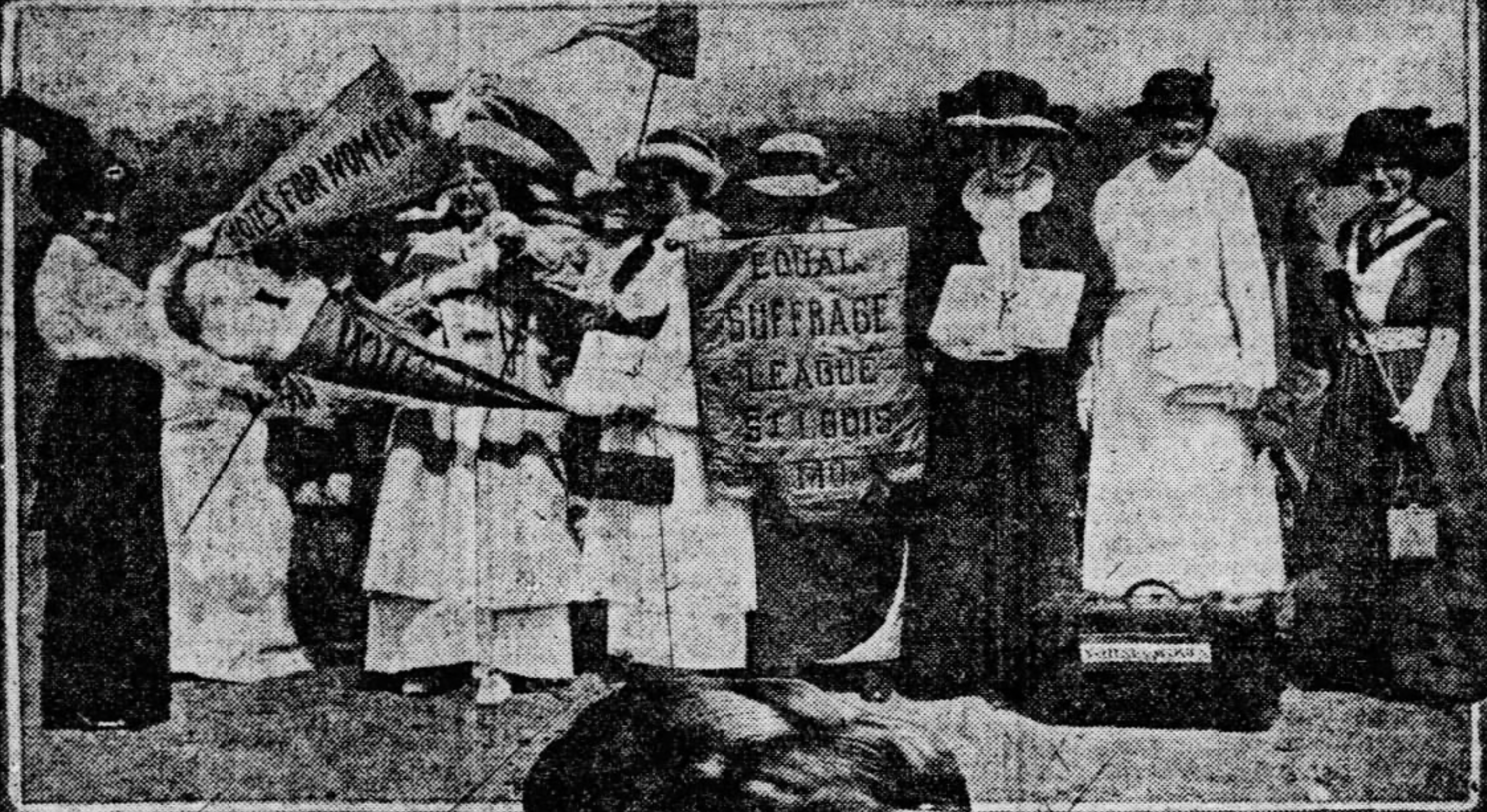
Suffrage activists filing the required signatures on June 27, 1914

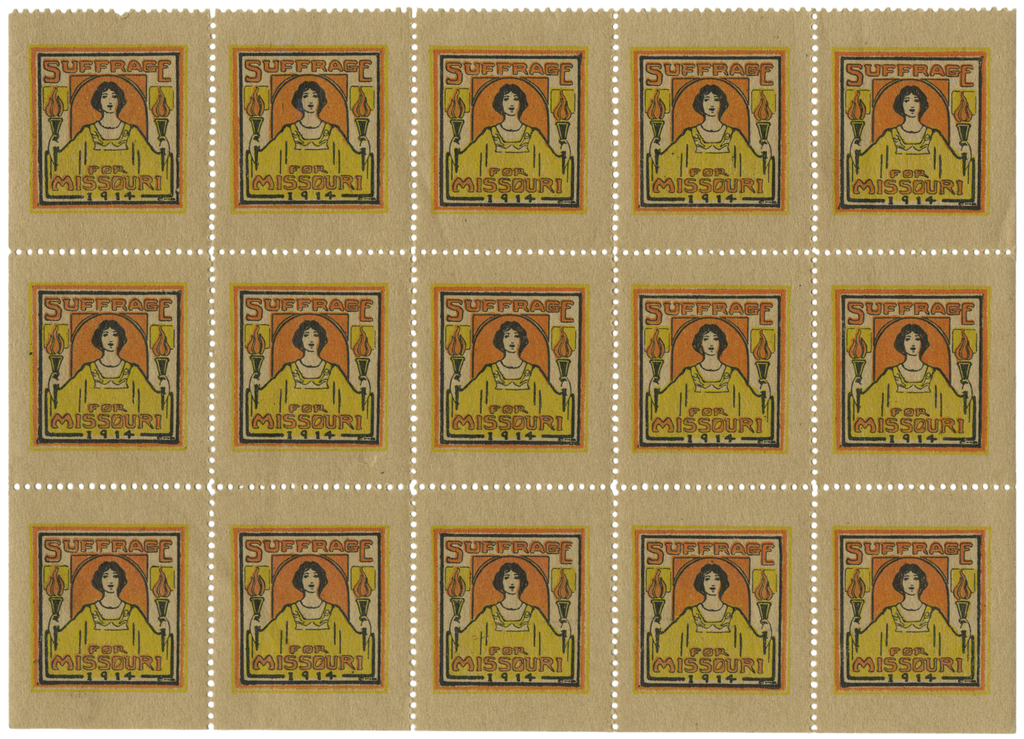
Sheet of 1914 Missouri women's suffrage stamps

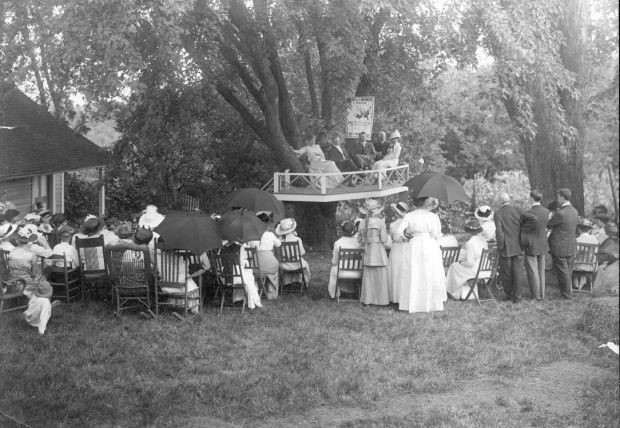
Suffrage meeting in Marthasville, Missouri, May 1914.
