= 2020 Missouri Amendment 2 =

Ballot initiative to expand Medicaid

Constitutional Amendment 2
- August 4, 2020
- Medicaid Expansion Initiative

Results
Choice	Votes	%
Yes	676,687	53.27%
No	593,491	46.73%
Total votes	1,270,178	100.00%
County results
Yes
80–90%
70–80%
60–70%
50–60%
No
80–90%
70–80%
60–70%
50–60%

2020 Missouri Amendment 2, also known as the Medicaid Expansion Initiative, was a ballot measure to amend the Constitution of Missouri to expand Medicaid under the Affordable Care Act. The initiative's vote was held on August 4, 2020, on the primary ballot, and passed with 53.27% of the vote. After Medicaid expansion ballot measures passed in other states, Republican lawmakers in Nebraska and Utah added work requirements to their states' Medicaid expansions, which supporters aimed to prevent by proposing state constitutional amendments for future Medicaid expansion initiatives.

Opponents sued to prevent the initiative from being voted on, but courts ruled in the measure's favor. The measure was supported most in urban areas and opposed in rural areas. After a delay due to a lack of funding from the Missouri General Assembly and resulting litigation, the initiative was implemented in October 2021, albeit slowly. Republican lawmakers attempted to roll back the program and add a work requirement through a state constitutional amendment, which failed after the United States Supreme Court effectively prevented the implementation of one.

== Background ==
The Affordable Care Act (ACA), enacted in 2010, initially required states to expand Medicaid coverage to continue receiving federal Medicaid funding, but the Supreme Court ruled in National Federation of Independent Business v. Sebelius that it would be unconstitutional to remove Medicaid funding from states that did not wish to opt in to the expansion. Nineteen states chose not to expand Medicaid coverage under the ACA.

In the late 2010s, the Fairness Project supported successful ballot initiatives to expand Medicaid under the ACA in states where Republican leaders were unwilling to do so. In 2017, a Medicaid expansion initiative with its support succeeded in Maine. In 2018, the Fairness Project successfully supported similar referendums in conservative-leaning Nebraska, Utah, and Idaho. After these initiatives passed, the Nebraska and Utah state legislatures added a work requirement to their Medicaid programs, although this had not been included in the ballot initiatives. Medicaid expansion supporters in other states that had not expanded Medicaid began supporting proposals to implement Medicaid expansion via constitutional amendments; since this meant another statewide referendum would be required to change an amendment that passed, this proposal would prevent similar work restrictions from being implemented by state legislatures. After a petition to put a Medicaid expansion initiative on the ballot in Missouri, via a constitutional amendment, gained about 346,000 signatures, Governor Mike Parson rescheduled the initiative to appear on the August primary ballot instead of on the November general election ballot.

Conservative organizations United for Missouri and Americans for Prosperity's Missouri branch filed lawsuits to prevent the expansion from appearing on the ballot, arguing the initiative violated a constitutional requirement for ballot initiatives to cite a funding source when appropriating funds. The Cole County Circuit Court ruled in favor of the proposal, stating the initiative itself did not appropriate funds or change how the state legislature appropriates funds. The organizations appealed the decision, additionally arguing that it violated a constitutional requirement that all petitions for ballot initiatives must contain the initiative's full text. On June 8, 2020, the Western District Missouri Court of Appeals unanimously upheld the lower court's ruling, allowing the initiative to remain on the ballot.

== Contents ==
The amendment appeared on the ballot as follows:

Do you want to amend the Missouri Constitution to:

- adopt Medicaid Expansion for persons 19 to 64 years old with an income level at or below 133% of the federal poverty level, as set forth in the Affordable Care Act;
- prohibit placing greater or additional burdens on eligibility or enrollment standards, methodologies or practices on persons covered under Medicaid Expansion than on any other population eligible for Medicaid; and
- require state agencies to take all actions necessary to maximize federal financial participation in funding medical assistance under Medicaid Expansion?

State government entities are estimated to have one-time costs of approximately $6.4 million and an unknown annual net fiscal impact by 2026 ranging from increased costs of at least $200 million to savings of $1 billion. Local governments expect costs to decrease by an unknown amount.

The deadline for the state to implement the specified Medicaid expansion was to be July 1, 2021.

== Campaigns ==
The initiative was campaigned for by YES on 2, which was supported by the Missouri Chamber of Commerce, the Missouri Hospital Association, the NAACP, the AARP, the AFL-CIO, and Catholic Charities of St. Louis, among others. The YES on 2 campaign rarely mentioned the Affordable Care Act, a law unpopular in the state, and some campaign material did not refer to a "Medicaid expansion". Instead, supporters noted the federal funding rural hospitals would receive as a result of the proposal's passage and stated it would prevent more hospitals from closing, as 15 in Missouri had done since 2014. Supporters said most hospital closures were in states which did not opt into the Medicaid expansion.

No on 2 in August campaigned against the initiative. The initiative was opposed by Republican politicians such as Governor Parson, who said that the state could not afford its share of the Medicaid expansion's cost. Other groups opposing the initiative included Missouri Right to Life, the Missouri Farm Bureau, and Americans for Prosperity. Missouri State House Budget Chair Cody Smith said that at the time, Medicaid had taken up 40% of Missouri's budget and noted that the state requires its budget to be balanced, so the cost of the expansion would need to come from other state programs such as education. Prior to the vote, No on 2 in August mailed campaign material suggesting undocumented immigrants would come to Missouri looking for Medicaid coverage, despite them not being eligible for Medicaid.

Democrats accused Governor Parson of scheduling the vote for the August primary elections instead of the higher-turnout general election to prevent the proposal from passing. Parson replied that he scheduled it in August to allow the state to understand, as soon as possible, whether it would need to account for extra spending in its budget assuming the initiative passes.

== Results ==
The measure was approved with about 53% of the vote. Support was most heavily concentrated in urban areas such as Columbia, Kansas City, St. Louis, and Springfield, while conservative voters in rural areas voted against the measure, including in counties with large numbers of uninsured residents. The amendment has been cited as an example of the popularity of expanding Medicaid, occurring weeks following the success of a similar ballot initiative in Oklahoma.

Constitutional Amendment 2
Choice	Votes	%
For	676,687	53.27
Against	593,491	46.73
Total	1,270,178	100.00

== Aftermath ==
The year following the measure's passage, lawmakers in the House Budget Committee voted against funding the expansion. Following the budget's passage, Governor Parson announced the state would be unable to expand its Medicaid program before the July 1 deadline. The state was then sued for not complying with the results of the ballot initiative. The initiative itself was ruled unconstitutional by a Cole County Circuit Court judge before being appealed to the Missouri Supreme Court, which overturned the lower court's ruling and required the state to implement the expansion in a 7–0 decision.

Enrollment in the Medicaid expansion began in October 2021, with Missouri becoming the 38th state to opt-in. Implementation was slow, with only 7% of newly eligible Missourians enrolling in the expansion's first month, compared to about 50% in Idaho and Montana. The state's outreach efforts regarding the expansion had been much slower than in other states such as Oklahoma. The state was also slow at processing applications, taking an average of 70 days in early 2022, even though federal law mandated wait times be under 45 days.

In 2022, Republican lawmakers proposed a constitutional amendment to allow the state legislature to decide how much it could fund the expansion and to implement a work requirement for it, claiming increases in the state's Medicaid budget following the passage of the initiative would be unsustainable. In April 2022, the United States Supreme Court refused to hear arguments in appeals from Arkansas and New Hampshire to rulings against work requirements they implemented in the late 2010s with approval from the Trump administration, vacating the lower-court decisions as moot given the Biden administration was no longer approving them. Republicans gave up on the proposed amendment shortly after. The following year, Republican lawmakers proposed requiring that 60% of voters approve of any future state constitutional amendment to make it more difficult for them to pass. However, it and similar proposals failed to pass in the Missouri Senate by the end of that year's session.

== See also ==
- List of Missouri ballot measures
- 2020 Missouri elections
