= List of Oklahoma ballot measures =

The following is a list of statewide initiatives and referendums modifying state law and proposing state constitutional amendments in Oklahoma, sorted by election.

== 2000s ==
=== 2004 ===
November 2004 general election
Proposal	Passed	YES votes	YES %	NO votes	NO %	Description
State Question 711	Yes	1,075,216	75.58	347,303	24.42	defined marriage as the union of a man and a woman, bans same-sex marriage

== 2010s ==
=== 2010 ===
November 2010 general election
Proposal	Passed	YES votes	YES %	NO votes	NO %	Description
State Question 744	No	189,164	18.59	828,589	81.41	mandated that the Oklahoma Legislature spend no less than the average amount spent by "neighboring states" (those states which border Oklahoma: Missouri, Texas, Kansas, Arkansas, Colorado and New Mexico) on "common education" (defined as grades pre-kindergarten through high school) on an annual, per-student basis. If the surrounding-state average ever declined, the legislature would be required to spend the same amount as it did the year before. The measure required that increased spending begin in the first fiscal year after its passage and that the surrounding-state average be met in the third fiscal year after passage.
State Question 746	Yes	746,053	74.34	257,523	25.66	requires that each person appearing to vote present a document proving their identity.
State Question 747	Yes	695,592	69.88	299,789	30.12	amend the Oklahoma Constitution by placing term limits on all Statewide elected officials. All officials would be allowed to serve no more two terms in office. Terms served need not be consecutive for the limits to apply.
State Question 748	Yes	567,288	58.42	403,733	41.58	Changes Apportionment Commission's name to the Bipartisan Commission on Legislative Apportionment and would increase the number of members from three to seven. The President pro tempore of the Oklahoma Senate would appoint one Democrat and one Republican, the Speaker of the Oklahoma House of Representatives would appoint one Democrat and one Republican, and the Governor of Oklahoma would appoint one Democrat and one Republican. The Lieutenant Governor of Oklahoma would chair the commission and would be a nonvoting member. It requires orders of redistricting to be signed by at least four members of the commission.
State Question 750	Yes	485,703	50.40	478,042	49.60	changes the number of signatures required for initiative and referendum petitions
State Question 751	Yes	740,918	75.54	239,904	24.46	adding a new Article to the Constitution. That Article would deal with the State's official actions. It dictates the language to be used in taking official State actions must be the English language. However, it allows for Native American languages could also be used and, when Federal law so requires, other languages could also be used.
State Question 752	Yes	606,805	62.83	358,925	37.17	adds two at-large members to the Oklahoma Judicial Nominating Commission.
State Question 754	No	361,907	37.08	614,219	62.92	amends Constitution to specify that the Constitution could not have required the Oklahoma Legislature to fund state functions based on: Predetermined constitutional formulas, How much other states spend on a function, and How much any entity spends on a function. In opposition to aforementioned SQ744
State Question 755	Yes	695,650	70.08	296,944	29.92	requires courts to rely solely on federal and state law when deciding cases. It forbids courts from considering or using international law or using Sharia.
State Question 756	Yes	638,530	64.73	347,956	35.27	prohibits making a person participate in a health care system, prohibits making an employer participate in a health care system, and prohibits making a health care provider provide treatment in a health care system. It would allow persons and employees to pay for treatment directly, it would allow a health care provider to accept payment for treatment directly, it would allow the purchase of health care insurance in private health care systems, and it would allow the sale of health insurance in private health care systems.
State Question 757	Yes	499,287	51.02	479,353	48.98	amends Section 23 of Article 10 of the Oklahoma Constitution. It would increase the amount of surplus revenue which goes into the Constitutional Reserve Fund. The amount would go from 10% to 15% of the funds certified as going to the General Revenue fund for the preceding fiscal year.

=== 2018 ===
June 2018 primary election
Proposal	Passed	YES votes	YES %	NO votes	NO %	Description
State Question 788	Yes	507,582	56.9	385,176	43.1	to legalize the licensed use, sale, and growth of marijuana in Oklahoma for medical purposes.

November 2018 general election
Proposal	Passed	YES votes	YES %	NO votes	NO %	Description
State Question 793	No	580,341	49.76	585,928	50.24	amend the Oklahoma Constitution to allow optometrists to practice within a mercantile establishment.
State Question 794	Yes	905,195	78.01	255,230	21.99	amend the Oklahoma Constitution to expand the rights of victims of crime.
State Question 798	No	528,614	45.91	622,863	54.09	amend the Oklahoma Constitution to provide that the governor and lieutenant governor be jointly elected.
State Question 800	No	488,612	42.78	653,630	57.22	amend the Oklahoma Constitution to create a new trust fund consisting of a portion of all taxes collected against the extraction of oil and gas resources.
State Question 801	No	572,811	49.6	581,989	50.4	amend the Oklahoma Constitution to allow voters within a local school district to expand the permissible use of property taxes to include school operations rather than just for school buildings.

== 2020s ==
=== 2020 ===
June 2020 primary election
Proposal	Passed	YES votes	YES %	NO votes	NO %	Description
State Question 802	Yes	340,572	50.49%	334,019	49.51%	Amends State Constitution to expand Medicaid to adults between 18 and 65 whose income is 133% of the federal poverty level or below under the Patient Protection and Affordable Care Act

November 2020 general election
Proposal	Passed	YES votes	YES %	NO votes	NO %	Description
State Question 805	No	588,280	38.92%	923,328	61.08%	Prohibits former felony convictions from being considered for calculating future punishments
State Question 814	No	615,161	41.21%	877,432	58.79%	Decreases payments to Tobacco Settlement Endowment Trust Fund from 75% to 25%, directs legislature to use money from fund to secure federal matching funds for state's Medicaid program
