= 2020 Oklahoma State Question 802 =

State Question 802
- Oklahoma Medicaid Expansion Initiative

Results
Choice	Votes	%
Yes	340,572	50.49%
No	334,019	49.51%
Total votes	674,591	100.00%

Yes
90–100%
80–90%
70–80%
60–70%
50–60%
No
90–100%
80–90%
70–80%
60–70%
50–60%
Other
Tie
No data

Oklahoma Question 802, the Oklahoma Medicaid Expansion Initiative, was a 2020 ballot measure on the June 30 ballot (alongside primaries for various statewide offices) to expand Medicaid in the state of Oklahoma. It passed narrowly, over the objections of many prominent state elected officials, such as Oklahoma's governor Kevin Stitt. Medicaid expansion went into effect on July 1, 2021.

== Contents ==
The proposal was listed on ballots as follows:

Medicaid is a government-sponsored health insurance program for qualifying low-income persons. This measure would add a provision to the Oklahoma Constitution requiring the State to expand Medicaid coverage. The expanded coverage would include certain persons over 18 and under 65 who are not already covered and whose annual income, as calculated under federal law, is at or below 133 percent of the federal poverty line. The federal poverty line changes annually, but for example if this measure were in effect in 2019, the measure generally would have covered a single adult making less than $17,236 annually and adults in a family of four making less than $35,535 annually.

Under this measure the State cannot create additional restrictions that make it more difficult to qualify for expanded Medicaid coverage than it is to qualify for the Medicaid program currently in place.

The Medicaid program is funded jointly by the federal government and the State. This measure would require the Oklahoma Health Care Authority (OHCA) to try to maximize federal funding for Medicaid expansion in Oklahoma. If the measure is approved, OHCA has 90 days to submit all documents necessary to obtain federal approval for implementing Medicaid expansion by July 1, 2021.

The wording was challenged by the Oklahoma Council of Public Affairs, a conservative think tank, which claimed that it was unconstitutional and misrepresenting what the measure actually does. The Oklahoma Supreme Court rejected their challenge.

== Support ==
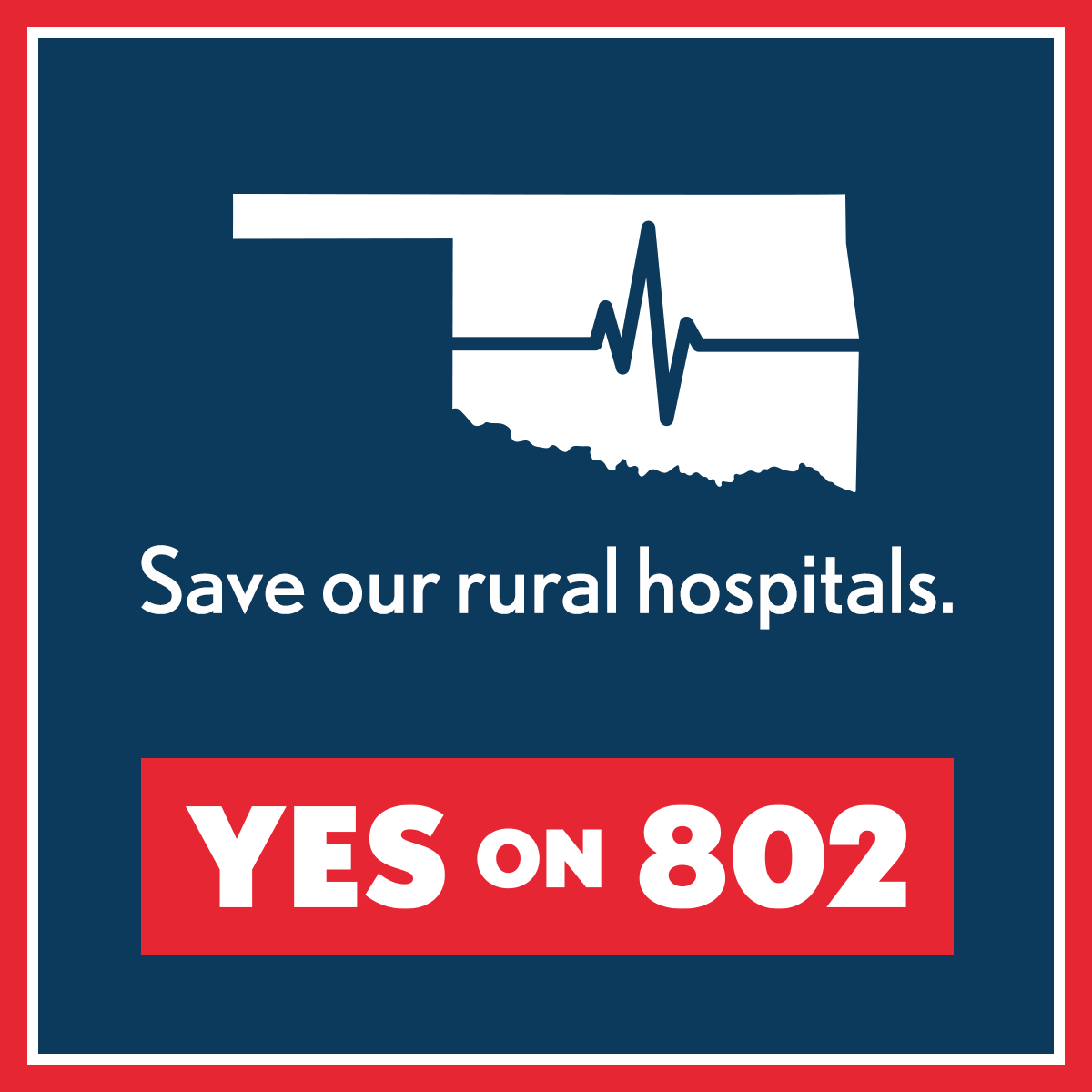
Yes on 802 campaign material

The Oklahoma Hospital Association, Oklahoma State Medical Association, Oklahoma Osteopathic Association, Oklahoma Nurses Association, and Saint Francis Health System filed a joint brief endorsing the proposal, writing "the initiative petition will allow the citizens of Oklahoma to demand that the state accept the federal dollars that 36 other states and the District of Columbia have already accepted in order to bring Medicaid coverage to many of their fellow Oklahomans who remain uninsured."

Oklahoma Senate Democrats supported the proposal and released a statement after its passage thanking voters.

== Opposition ==
Many prominent Republican politicians in Oklahoma, such as the governor Kevin Stitt, and the Oklahoma Senate Appropriations Chairman Roger Thompson, opposed the proposal, citing its potential costs and claiming that cuts to other areas such as education might be necessary.

== Results ==
Question 802
Choice	Votes	%
For	340,572	50.49
Against	334,019	49.51
Total	674,591	100.00

The ballot measure passed narrowly, with 50.49% voting in favor to 49.51% voting against. Much of the proposal's support came from Tulsa and Oklahoma City. 90% of counties in Oklahoma voted against the proposal.

== Effects ==
Medicaid expansion was scheduled to go into effect on July 1, 2021.

On August 2, 2021, the Tulsa World reported that over 150,000 additional Oklahomans received SoonerCare due to the effects of the Medicaid expansion.

== See also ==
- 2020 Missouri Amendment 2, a similar ballot measure in Missouri
- List of Oklahoma ballot measures
- 2020 Oklahoma elections
