= 2020 Oklahoma elections =

- November 3, 2020

Elections were held in Oklahoma on Tuesday, November 3, 2020. Its primaries were held on June 30, 2020, with runoffs taking place on August 25. Its presidential primaries were an exception to this, occurring on March 3, 2020.

In addition to the U.S. presidential race, Oklahoma voters will elect the Class II U.S. senator from Oklahoma, 1 of 3 members of the Oklahoma Corporation Commission, all of its seats to the House of Representatives, 3 of 9 seats on the Oklahoma Supreme Court, 2 of 5 seats on the Oklahoma Court of Criminal Appeals, 3 of 12 seats on the Oklahoma Court of Civil Appeals, all of the seats of the Oklahoma House of Representatives and 25 of 48 seats in the Oklahoma State Senate. There are also two ballot measures that will be voted on, in addition to one passed in the June 30 primary.

== Federal offices ==
=== President of the United States ===
Oklahoma has 7 electoral votes in the Electoral College. They went to incumbent president Donald Trump.

=== United States Class II Senate Seat ===
Parties	Seats			
Parties	2018	2020	±	Strength
Republican Party	2	2	0	100%
Democratic Party	0	0	0	0%

=== United States House of Representatives ===
Parties	Seats			
Parties	2018	2020	±	Strength
Republican Party	4	5	▲1	100%
Democratic Party	1	0	▼1	0%

There are 5 U.S. Representatives in Oklahoma who will be up for election.

== Corporation Commission ==
=== Polling ===
Poll source	Date(s) administered	Sample size (Note: Key: A – all adults RV – registered voters LV – likely voters V – unclear)	Margin of error	Todd Hiett (R)	Todd Hagopian (L)	Undecided
SoonerPoll/News 9/News on 6	October 15–20, 2020	5,466 (LV)	± 1.33%	56%	15%	29%

=== Results ===
2020 Oklahoma Corporation Commission election
Party	Candidate	Votes	%	±%
Republican	Todd Hiett (incumbent)	1,100,024	76.1%	−23.9%
Libertarian	Todd Hagopian	345,436	23.9%	N/A
Total votes		1,445,460	100.0%	

Results by county Hiett: 60–70%; 70–80%; 80–90%; 90–100%

== State Judiciary ==
The state's two courts of last resort have 9 and 5 seats respectively. Elections are officially nonpartisan.

== State legislature ==
All 101 seats of the Oklahoma House of Representatives and 25 of 48 seats of the Oklahoma State Senate are up for election.

=== State senate ===
Before the election, the composition of the state senate was:

Parties	Seats			
Parties	2018	2020	±	Strength
Republican Party	39	39	0	81%
Democratic Party	9	9	0	19%

=== House of Representatives ===
Before the election the composition of the state house was:

Parties	Seats			
Parties	2018	2020	±	Strength
Republican Party	77	82	▲5	80%
Democratic Party	24	19	▼5	20%

== Ballot Initiatives ==
- 2020 Oklahoma State Question 802

=== Polling ===
Question 805

Poll source	Date(s) administered	Sample size	Margin of error	Yes (for the amendment)	No (against the amendment)	Undecided
SoonerPoll/News 9/News on 6	October 15–20, 2020	5,466 (LV)	± 1.33%	45%	35%	20%

Question 814

Poll source	Date(s) administered	Sample size	Margin of error	Yes (for the amendment)	No (against the amendment)	Undecided
SoonerPoll/News 9/News on 6	October 15–20, 2020	5,466 (LV)	± 1.33%	46%	26%	28%

Question 802 results by county Yes: 60–70%; 50–60%; No: 70–80%; 60–70%; 50–60%

Question 805 results by county No: 80–90%; 70–80%; 60–70%; 50–60%; Yes: 50–60%

Question 814 results by county No: 60–70%; 50–60%

== Local elections ==
- 2020 Tulsa mayoral election
