= Federal Medical Assistance Percentages =

Rates of funding offered by the U.S. government to the states

Federal Medical Assistance Percentages (FMAP) are the percentage rates used to determine the matching funds rate allocated annually to certain medical and social service programs in the United States of America. FMAP-eligible programs are joint federal-state partnerships between the federal government of the United States and state governments, which are administered by the states. Thus, FMAP is an example of administration of federal assistance in the United States. The percentages given are the share of the total cost that the federal government will pay, the rest being covered by the state. For example, 100% FMAP for some eligible service means that the federal government pays the entire cost and 50% FMAP would mean that the cost is split evenly between the state and federal government.

Funds that are eligible for FMAP match include Medicaid, State Children's Health Insurance Program (SCHIP) expenditures, Temporary Assistance for Needy Families (TANF) Contingency Funds, the Federal share of Child Support Enforcement collections, and Child Care Mandatory and Matching Funds of the Child Care and Development Fund.

State governments use FMAP percentages to determine the federal government's contribution to specific state administered programs and assess their related budgetary outlays. For example, the general 2006–2007 FMAP rate for California was 50% meaning that for every dollar that California contributed to an eligible social or medical program between 2006 and 2007, the federal government also contributed one dollar.

Within Medicaid, the FMAP can vary. For example, the FMAP for administrative activities is between 50 and 100%. For provider payments, certain populations, programs, and services have enhanced FMAPs, such as the Children's Health Insurance Program, individuals enrolled under the Affordable Care Act's Medicaid expansion, and certain women with breast or cervical cancer.

== History ==
Pursuant to Section 1905(b) of the Social Security Act, the Secretary of Health and Human Services calculates the Federal Medical Assistance Percentages each year. This calculation is based upon a formula which compares individual state income to the continental United States income in order to determine ratios the federal government will utilize in assisting each state under the Act. This section also provides that no state's ratio will go lower than 50% or higher than 83%.

The FMAP formula disproportionately benefits states in the South, as these states have the highest poverty rates. This reflects the politics of the time as representatives from southern states led key congressional committees. These members of Congress were able to leverage their positions to design an FMAP formula that benefitted their states.

The guidelines for calculating the FMAP are outlined in the Social Security Act and they exclusively determine the ratio of matching funds for each state's Medicaid program. Section 2105(b)of the Act stipulate that "Enhanced Federal Medical Assistance Percentages," or Enhanced FMAPs, will be calculated at the same time as the FMAPs. Enhanced FMAPs provide ratios for states to follow in funding their State Children's Health Insurance Program, or SCHIP.

== Notes ==
- National Conference of State Legislatures, "Federal Medical Assistance Percentages (FMAP) FY 2007 Calculations" ncsl.org. Retrieved on February 13, 2007.
- Federal Register / Vol. 70, No. 229 / Wednesday, November 30, Department of Health and Human Services, Federal Financial Participation in State Assistance Expenditures; Federal Matching Shares for Medicaid, the State Children's Health Insurance Program, and Aid to Needy Aged, Blind, or Disabled Persons for October 1, 2006 Through September 30 (PDF)
- aspe.hhs.gov
