= 2020 Missouri elections =

Missouri elections, 2020
- November 6, 2020

Missouri state elections in 2020 were held on Tuesday, November 3, 2020. Aside from its presidential primaries held on March 10, its primary elections were held on August 4, 2020.

In addition to the U.S. presidential race, Missouri voters elected the Governor of Missouri, four of Missouri's other executive officers, all of its seats to the House of Representatives, all of the seats of the Missouri House of Representatives, and 17 of 34 seats in the Missouri State Senate. Neither of the state's two U.S. Senate seats were up for election this year, but there were two ballot measures voted on, in addition to one voted on in the August 4 primaries.

To vote by mail, registered Missouri voters had to request a ballot by October 21, 2020.

== Federal offices ==
=== President of the United States ===
Missouri has 10 electoral votes in the Electoral College.

=== United States House of Representatives ===
There are 7 U.S. Representatives in Missouri that will be up for election. Another seat is open after the incumbent, Lacy Clay, lost renomination in its Democratic primary.

== State legislature ==
All 163 seats of the Missouri House of Representatives and 17 of 34 seats of the Missouri State Senate are up for election. Before the election, the composition of the Missouri State Legislature was:

=== State senate ===
Party	# of seats
Republican	24
Democratic	10
Total	34

=== House of Representatives ===
Party	# of seats
Republican	116
Democratic	47
Total	163 (Note: Including 2 vacancies)

After the election, the composition of the Missouri State Legislature was:

=== State senate ===
Party	# of seats
Republican	24
Democratic	10
Total	34

=== House of Representatives ===
Party	# of seats
Republican	114
Democratic	49
Total	163 (Note: Including 2 vacancies)

=== Primary election ===
==== Senate District 3 - Republican ====
Polling

Poll source	Date(s) administered	Sample size (Note: Key: A – all adults RV – registered voters LV – likely voters V – unclear)	Margin of error	Joshua Barrett	Elaine Freeman Gannon	Kent Scism	Undecided
Remington Research Group/Missouri Scout	June 24–25, 2020	500 (LV)	± 4.3%	24%	23%	19%	34%

==== Senate District 5 - Democratic ====
Polling

Poll source	Date(s) administered	Sample size	Margin of error	Jeremiah Church	McFarlane Duncan	Megan Elliya Green	William "Bill" Haas	Peter Merideth	Steve Roberts	Michelle Sherod	Undecided
Remington Research Group/Missouri Scout	April 1–2, 2020	486 (LV)	± 4.6%	7%	1%	16%	14%	–	18%	9%	35%
Remington Research Group/Missouri Scout	December 4–5, 2019	464 (LV)	± 4.6%	–	3%	24%	–	–	24%	4%	45%
Remington Research Group/Missouri Scout	August 21–22, 2019	501 (LV)	± 4.5%	– (Note: With Peter Meredith, Steve Roberts and Michelle Sherod)	–	–	–	20%	24%	13%	43%
Remington Research Group/Missouri Scout	August 21–22, 2019	501 (LV)	± 4.5%	– (Note: With Megan Green, Steve Roberts and Michelle Sherod)	–	32%	–	–	23%	11%	34%
Remington Research Group/Missouri Scout	August 21–22, 2019	501 (LV)	± 4.5%	– (Note: With Steve Roberts and Michelle Sherod)	–	–	–	–	24%	21%	55%

==== Senate District 13 - Democratic ====
Polling

Poll source	Date(s) administered	Sample size	Margin of error	Alan Green	Angela Mosley	Tommie Pierson Jr.	Undecided
Remington Research Group/Missouri Scout	June 3–4, 2020	545 (LV)	± 4.2%	15%	21%	19%	45%
Remington Research Group/Missouri Scout	October 16–17, 2019	421 (LV)	± 4.9%	15%	18%	19%	48%

==== Senate District 23 - Republican ====
Polling

Poll source	Date(s) administered	Sample size	Margin of error	Bill Eigel	Dan O'Connell	Eric Wulff	Undecided
Remington Research Group/Missouri Scout	July 8–9, 2020	436 (LV)	± 4.8%	33%	8%	7%	52%

==== Senate District 25 - Republican ====
Polling

Poll source	Date(s) administered	Sample size	Margin of error	Jason Bean	Stephen Carroll Cookson	Eddy Justice	Jeff Shawan	Undecided
Remington Research Group/Missouri Scout	July 8–9, 2020	436 (LV)	± 4.8%	26%	11%	23%	17%	23%
Remington Research Group/Missouri Scout	July 30–31, 2019	438 (LV)	± 4.7%	–	–	17%	16%	67%

==== Senate District 27 - Republican ====
Polling

Poll source	Date(s) administered	Sample size	Margin of error	Holly Rehder	Kathy Swan	Undecided
Remington Research Group/Missouri Scout	July 16–17, 2020	414 (LV)	± 4.9%	51%	29%	20%
Remington Research Group/Missouri Scout	August 7–8, 2019	520 (LV)	± 4.3%	26%	27%	48%

==== Senate District 29 - Republican ====
Polling

Poll source	Date(s) administered	Sample size	Margin of error	David Cole	Mike Moon	Undecided
Remington Research Group/Missouri Scout	July 25–26, 2020	504 (LV)	± 4.5%	34%	37%	29%
Remington Research Group/Missouri Scout	April 21–23, 2020	536 (LV)	± 4.2%	15%	25%	60%
Remington Research Group/Missouri Scout	July 17–18, 2019	532 (LV)	± 4.3%	14%	21%	65%

==== Senate District 31 - Republican ====
Polling

Poll source	Date(s) administered	Sample size	Margin of error	Jack Bondon	Rick Brattin	Bill Yarberry	Undecided
Remington Research Group/Missouri Scout	July 21–23, 2020	403 (LV)	± 4.9%	40%	34%	6%	20%
Remington Research Group/Missouri Scout	April 15–16, 2020	419 (LV)	± 4.76%	16%	18%	5%	60%

==== Senate District 33 - Republican ====
Polling

Poll source	Date(s) administered	Sample size	Margin of error	Karla Eslinger	Van Kelly	Robert Ross	Undecided
Remington Research Group/Missouri Scout	July 27–29, 2020	503 (LV)	± 4.5%	20%	17%	39%	24%
Missouri Scout	July 12–13, 2020	456 (LV)	± 4.5%	31%	12%	36%	31%
Remington Research Group/Missouri Scout	May 6–7, 2020	568 (LV)	± 4.0%	15%	12%	16%	57%
Remington Research Group/Missouri Scout	July 24–25, 2019	510 (LV)	± 4.5%	–	16%	15%	69%

=== General election ===
==== Senate District 1 ====
Polling

Poll source	Date(s) administered	Sample size	Margin of error	Doug Beck (D)	David Lenihan (R)	Undecided
Remington Research Group/Missouri Scout	September 9–10, 2020	646 (LV)	± 3.8%	43%	36%	21%

==== Senate District 15 ====
Polling

Poll source	Date(s) administered	Sample size	Margin of error	Andrew Koenig (R)	Deb Lavender (D)	Undecided
Remington Research Group/Missouri Scout	October 7–8, 2020	644 (LV)	± 3.8%	45%	49%	6%
Remington Research Group/Missouri Scout	August 19–20, 2020	585 (LV)	± 4%	43%	43%	14%
Remington Research Group/Missouri Scout	May 29–30, 2019	648 (LV)	± 3.8%	50%	35%	15%

Hypothetical polling in District 15

with Mark Osmack

Poll source	Date(s) administered	Sample size	Margin of error	Andrew Koenig (R)	Mark Osmack (D)	Undecided
Remington Research Group/Missouri Scout	May 29–30, 2019	648 (LV)	± 3.8%	52%	33%	15%

==== Senate District 19 ====
Polling

Poll source	Date(s) administered	Sample size	Margin of error	Caleb Rowden (R)	Judy Baker (D)	Undecided
Remington Research Group/Missouri Scout	October 20–22, 2020	489 (LV)	± 4.4%	48%	48%	4%
Remington Research Group/Missouri Scout	August 26–27, 2020	536 (LV)	± 4.2%	47%	42%	11%

Hypothetical polling in District 19

with Michela Skelton

Poll source	Date(s) administered	Sample size	Margin of error	Caleb Rowden (R)	Michela Skelton (D)	Undecided
Remington Research Group/Missouri Scout	September 25–27, 2019	446 (LV)	± 4.7%	50%	44%	6%

== Ballot measures ==
Missouri Amendment 2, Medicaid Expansion passed in the August 4 primary.

Missouri Amendment 3, Redistricting Process and Criteria, Lobbying, and Campaign Finance Amendment is to amend the state constitution to lower thresholds for lobbyists' gifts, lower campaign contribution limits for state senate campaigns and reverse changes to the redistricting process brought about by the passage of 2018's Missouri Amendment 1, known as "Clean Missouri". That amendment (aimed to prevent gerrymandering) delegated redistricting to a nonpartisan state demographer and citizens' commission as opposed to the status quo ante of it being left to a bipartisan commission appointed by the governor.

=== Polling ===
==== Primary election ====
Amendment 2

Poll source	Date(s) administered	Sample size	Margin of error	For Missouri Amendment 1	Against Missouri Amendment 1	Undecided
Remington Research Group/Missouri Scout	April 28–29, 2020	1,356 (LV)	± 2.6%	54%	32%	14%
Human Agency/Missouri Scout	December 20–24, 2019	415 (RV)	± 5%	46%	33%	21%
Human Agency/Missouri Scout	November 17–20, 2020	400 (RV)	± 5%	41%	29%	29%
Remington Research Group/Missouri Scout	November 12–13, 2019	1,641 (LV)	± 2.4%	57%	25%	18%
Human Agency/Missouri Scout	September 16–18, 2019	825 (RV)	± 4.0%	42%	25%	33%
Remington Research Group/Missouri Scout	September 4–5, 2019	910 (LV)	± 3.3%	44%	33%	23%
Remington Research Group/Missouri Scout	June 12–13, 2019	986 (LV)	± 3.2%	40%	37%	23%

==== General election ====
Amendment 1

Poll source	Date(s) administered	Sample size	Margin of error	For Missouri Amendment 1	Against Missouri Amendment 1	Undecided
YouGov/SLU	September 24 – October 7, 2020	931 (LV)	± 3.9%	51%	29%	20%
Remington Research Group/Missouri Scout	September 20–21, 2020	1,046 (LV)	± 3%	60%	26%	14%

Amendment 3

Poll source	Date(s) administered	Sample size	Margin of error	For Missouri Amendment 3	Against Missouri Amendment 3	Undecided
Remington Research Group/Missouri Scout	October 28–29, 2020	1,010 (LV)	± 3%	29%	56%	15%
Remington Research Group/Missouri Scout	October 14–15, 2020	1,010 (LV)	± 3%	28%	50%	22%
YouGov/SLU	September 24 – October 7, 2020	931 (LV)	± 3.9%	35%	43%	23%
Remington Research Group/Missouri Scout	September 20–21, 2020	1,046 (LV)	± 3%	44%	30%	26%
Remington Research Group/Missouri Scout	August 12–13, 2020	1,112 (LV)	± 3.0%	46%	19%	35%

Amendment 1 results by county No: 50–60%; Yes: 50–60%

Amendment 2 results by county Yes: 80–90%; 70–80%; 60–70%; 50–60%; No: 80–90%; 70–80%; 60–70%; 50–60%

Amendment 3 results by county Yes: 70–80%; 60–70%; 50–60%; No: 60–70%; 50–60%

== Notes ==
Partisan clients
