= 2018 Oklahoma State Question 788 =

State Question 788
- Oklahoma Medical Marijuana Legalization Initiative

Results
Choice	Votes	%
Yes	507,582	56.86%
No	385,176	43.14%
Total votes	892,758	100.00%
- No: >90% 80–90% 70–80% 60–70% 50–60% Yes: >90% 80–90% 70–80% 60–70% 50–60% Other: Tie No votes

Oklahoma Question 788, the Oklahoma Medical Marijuana Legalization Initiative, was a 2018 ballot measure on the June 26 ballot (alongside primaries for various statewide offices) to legalize medical marijuana in the state of Oklahoma. It passed with over 56% "yes" votes.

== Contents ==
The proposal was listed on ballots as follows:

This measure amends the Oklahoma State Statutes. A yes vote legalizes the licensed use, sale, and growth of marijuana in Oklahoma for medicinal purposes. A license is required for use and possession of marijuana for medicinal purposes and must be approved by an Oklahoma Board Certified Physician.

The State Department of Health will issue medical marijuana licenses if the applicant is eighteen years of age and an Oklahoma resident. A special exception will be granted to an applicant under the age of eighteen, however these applications must be signed by two physicians and a parent or legal guardian.

The Department will also issue seller, grower, packaging, transportation, research and caregiver licenses. Individual and retail businesses must meet minimal requirements to be licensed to sell marijuana to licensees.

The punishment for unlicensed possession of permitted amounts of marijuana for individuals who can state a medical condition is a fine not exceeding four hundred dollars. Fees and zoning restrictions are established. A seven percent state tax is imposed on medical marijuana sales.

Shall the proposal be approved?

For the proposal - YES

Against the proposal - NO

A "YES" vote is a vote in favor of this measure. A "NO" vote is a vote against this measure.

== Results ==
Question 802
Choice	Votes	%
For	507,582	56.86
Against	385,176	43.14
Total	892,758	100.00

== See also ==
- List of Oklahoma ballot measures
- List of 2018 United States cannabis reform proposals
