= 2004 Missouri Amendment 2 =

Referendum to ban same-sex marriage

Constitutional Amendment 2
- August 3, 2004
- Missouri Marriage Definition Amendment

Results
Choice	Votes	%
Yes	1,055,771	70.61%
No	439,529	29.39%
Total votes	1,495,300	100.00%
Registered voters/turnout	3,483,481	42.93%
County results
Yes
80–90%
70–80%
60–70%
50–60%
No
50–60%

Constitutional Amendment 2 of 2004 is an amendment to the Missouri Constitution that prohibited same-sex marriages from being recognized in Missouri. The Amendment passed via public referendum on August 3, 2004, with 71% of voters supporting and 29% opposing. Every county voted in favor of the amendment, with only the independent city of St. Louis voting against it.

The text of the adopted amendment, which is found at Article I, section 33 of the Missouri Constitution, states:

That to be valid and recognized in this state, a marriage shall exist only between a man and a woman.

This amendment was voided by the 2015 decision of the United States Supreme Court in Obergefell v. Hodges, which overturned statewide bans on same-sex marriage nationwide.
