= Constitution of Missouri =

American state constitution

1945 Constitution of the State of Missouri
- Location of the state of Missouri within the United States

Overview
- Jurisdiction: Missouri, United States
- Subordinate to: United States Constitution
- Created: September 28, 1944
- Ratified: February 27, 1945

Government structure
- Branches: Three departments
- Chambers: Bicameral Missouri General Assembly
- Executive: Governor of Missouri
- Judiciary: Judiciary of Missouri, headed by the Supreme Court of Missouri

History
- Amendments: 126 as of 2025
- Citation: Constitution of the State of Missouri (1945) – via Wikisource.
- Author: 1943–44 Missouri Constitutional Convention
- Supersedes: Missouri Constitution of 1875 and amendments

The Missouri Constitution is the state constitution of the U.S. state of Missouri. It is the supreme law formulating the law and government of Missouri, subject only to the federal Constitution, and the people. The fourth and current Missouri Constitution was adopted in 1945. It provides for three branches of government: legislative (the Missouri General Assembly), executive (the Governor of Missouri), and judicial (the Supreme Court of Missouri). It also sets up local governments in the form of counties and cities.

== History ==
The first constitution was written by Constitutional Convention in 1820 in only 38 days, and was adopted on July 19, 1820. One of the results of the Missouri Compromise, Missouri was initially admitted to the Union as a slave state, and the constitution specifically excluded "free negroes and mulattoes" from the state. This "exclusion clause" initially forestalled the US Congress admitting Missouri to the union, but was chosen to be interpreted in a deliberately vague manner as a "second" compromise. This constitution took effect the day Missouri joined the union as the twenty-fourth state, August 10, 1821.

The second convention in 1845 produced a constitution rejected by voters.

During the American Civil War, the Missouri Constitutional Convention (1861–63) was elected to decide on secession. They chose against secession, and did not produce a new constitution. Instead, they operated as the de facto pro-Union government of Missouri when Governor Claiborne Fox Jackson and other politicians that supported the Confederacy fled from Jefferson City. They provided elections to a new constitutional convention, which was elected in November 1864 and met in January 1865, and passed a second Missouri state constitution that abolished slavery, ratified on June 6, 1865. This second constitution was known as the "Draconian Constitution" due to its loyalty oath provisions, which were struck down by the US Supreme Court in Cummings v. Missouri (1867). This constitution remained in effect for ten years.

The fourth constitutional convention was held in 1875, which drafted the state's third constitution. The convention met from May 5 to August 2, and the resulting constitution provided for, among other things, separate schools for African-American children. In the early 1900s, the Constitution of 1875 was amended to allow constitutional amendment by the initiative process.

The state's fifth constitutional convention was held from 1922 to 1923. This convention proposed a slate of twenty-one amendments instead of a new constitution. The delegates assembled in Jefferson City from May 15, 1922, to November 6, 1923. The ballot form permitted a separate vote on each amendment with a simple majority allowing adoption. Seven of the 21 amendments were adopted. The election details are available in the 1925-1926 Official Manual of Missouri.

In the early 20th century, Missouri was dominated by corrupt political "bosses", such as Tom Pendergast of Kansas City. In reaction to this, reformers used the initiative to call for a sixth constitutional convention, and the initiative was passed by the voters in 1942. The voters ratified the new constitution in 1945. The Constitution of 1945 remains Missouri's current constitution. Since 1945, there have been at least 119 amendments made to the Constitution. In recent years, some of these have been both controversial and high-profile, such as legalizing commercial gambling in 1993, Missouri Constitutional Amendment 2 (2006) (allowing the production of human embryos for stem cell research), Missouri Constitutional Amendment 2 (2004) (an amendment prohibiting same-sex marriage), and an English-only amendment in 2008. On November 6, 2018, a constitutional amendment was passed that legalized and regulated medical marijuana (see Cannabis in Missouri).

According to Article XII of the present constitution, the people of Missouri are given the option to call a new constitutional convention every 20 years through an automatic referendum that appears on that year's ballot. This has been voted on in 1962, 1982, 2002, 2022, and will be voted on again in 2042. To date, these referendums have not passed.

== Articles ==
=== Articles of the Constitution ===
The 1945 constitution starts with a preamble that was also used in the 1875 constitution. It reads:

We, the people of Missouri, with profound reverence for the Supreme Ruler of the Universe, and grateful for His goodness, do establish this Constitution for the better government of the state.

The remainder of the constitution consists of fourteen articles as of 2018.

==== Remaining Articles ====
- Article II - The Distribution of Powers
- Article III - Legislative Department
- Article IV - Executive Department
- Article V - Judicial Department and Schedule
- Article VI - Local Government
- Article VII - Public Officers
- Article VIII - Suffrage and Elections
- Article IX - Education
- Article X - Taxation
- Article XI - Corporations
- Article XII - Amending the Constitution
- Article XIII - Public Employees
- Article XIV - Medical Cannabis

== See also ==
- Law and government of Missouri
  - Missouri General Assembly
  - Governor of Missouri
  - Supreme Court of Missouri
- Missouri Constitutional Convention of 1861–1863
- List of Missouri ballot measures
