= 1961 Speedway National League =

British motorcycle speedway season

- League: National League
- No. of competitors: 10
- Champions: Wimbledon Dons
- National Trophy: Southampton Saints
- Highest average: Ove Fundin
- Division/s below: 1961 Provincial League

The 1961 National League was the 27th season and the sixteenth post-war season of the highest tier of motorcycle speedway in Great Britain.

== Summary ==
The entry list was identical to the previous year and although Wimbledon Dons won their seventh title in eight years, it would be their last.

== Final table ==
Pos	Team	PL	W	D	L	Pts
1	Wimbledon Dons	18	15	0	3	30
2	Southampton Saints	18	13	2	3	28
3	Coventry Bees	18	10	1	7	21
4	Belle Vue Aces	18	10	0	8	20
5	Swindon Robins	18	8	0	10	16
6	Ipswich Witches	18	7	1	10	15
7	Norwich Stars	18	7	0	11	14
8	New Cross Rangers	18	7	0	11	14
9	Oxford Cheetahs	18	6	1	11	13
10	Leicester Hunters	18	4	1	13	9

== Fixtures and results ==
Home \ Away	BV	COV	IPS	LEI	NC	NOR	OX	SOT	SWI	WIM
Belle Vue		57–21	44–34	52–26	60–17	40–38	48–30	44–34	43–35	48–30
Coventry	45–33		46–32	50–28	46–32	41–37	40–38	39–39	54–24	43–35
Ipswich	40–38	43–35		44–33	51–27	50–28	51–27	36–41	42–36	34–44
Leicester	35–43	34–44	39–39		46–32	40–38	42–36	36–42	50–28	37–41
New Cross	41–37	47–31	55–23	54–24		51–27	44–34	31–45	44–33	34–44
Norwich	40–38	37–41	46.5–31.5	49–29	55–23		43–23	45–33	52–26	37–41
Oxford	45–33	59–19	40–38	51–27	48–30	41–37		39–39	32–46	33–45
Southampton	42–36	53–25	49–29	56–22	56–22	53–25	45–33		42–36	49–29
Swindon	45–33	47–31	41–37	44–34	54–24	45–33	48–30	37–41		34–44
Wimbledon	44–34	53–25	51–27	61–17	60–18	54–24	52–26	49–29	53–24	

Legend: Blue = home team win; Yellow = draw; Red = away team win.

== Top ten averages (league only) ==
	Rider	Nat	Team	C.M.A.
1	Ove Fundin	(Sweden)	Norwich	11.51
2	Ronnie Moore	(New Zealand)	Wimbledon	11.17
3	Peter Craven	(England)	Belle Vue	10.95
4	Björn Knutson	(Sweden)	Southampton	10.79
5	Arne Pander	(Denmark)	Oxford	10.60
6	Barry Briggs	(New Zealand)	Southampton	10.13
7	Ron How	(England)	Wimbledon	10.05
8	Ron Johnston	(New Zealand)	Belle Vue	10.00
9	Ken McKinlay	(Scotland)	Leicester	9.57
10	Bob Duckworth	(New Zealand)	Belle Vue	9.48

== National Trophy ==
The 1961 National Trophy was the 23rd edition of the Knockout Cup. Southampton were the winners.

First round

Date	Team one	Score	Team two
15/06	Oxford	43-40	Southampton
13/06	Southampton	58-26	Oxford
10/06	Belle Vue	55-28	New Cross
07/06	New Cross	46-37	Belle Vue

Second round

Date	Team one	Score	Team two
17/08	Ipswich	44-40	Coventry
09/08	Norwich	43-40	Swindon
08/08	Southampton	52-32	Belle Vue
29/07	Belle Vue	47-37	Southampton
24/07	Wimbledon	46-38	Norwich
22/07	Norwich	52-32	Wimbledon
22/07	Swindon	66-18	Leicester
21/07	Leicester	38-45	Swindon

Semifinals

Date	Team one	Score	Team two
09/09	Swindon	56-28	Norwich
29/08	Southampton	57-27	Coventry
26/08	Coventry	49-35	Southampton
09/08	Norwich	43-40	Swindon

=== Final ===
First leg

19 September 1961

Southampton Saints Björn Knutson 15 Barry Briggs 14 Dick Bradley 9 Alby Golden 6 Peter Vandenberg 4 Cyril Roger 4 Chum Taylor 3	55 – 29	Swindon Robins Tadeusz Teodorowicz 7 Neil Street 6 Ian Williams 5 Brian Brett 4 George White 4 Mike Broadbank 2 Brian Meredith 1

Banister Court Stadium

Second leg

23 September 1961

Swindon Robins Tadeusz Teodorowicz 9 Mike Broadbank 8 George White 8 Brian Meredith 5 Ian Williams 4 Brian Brett 4 Neil Street 3	41 – 43	Southampton Saints Björn Knutson 15 Barry Briggs 13 Chum Taylor 8 Peter Vandenberg 4 Dick Bradley 3 Cyril Roger 0 Alby Golden 0

Abbey Stadium

Southampton were National Trophy Champions, winning on aggregate 98–70.

== Riders & final averages ==
Belle Vue

- (England) Peter Craven 10.95
- (New Zealand) Ron Johnston 10.00
- (New Zealand) Bob Duckworth 9.48
- (England) Dick Fisher 7.30
- (England) Jack Kitchen 5.90
- (England) Slant Payling 3.60
- (England) Jim Yacoby 3.25
- (New Zealand) Bryce Subritzky 3.21
- (England) Bill Powell 2.67
- (England) Peter Kelly 2.00

Coventry

- (England) Nigel Boocock 7.84
- (Australia) Jack Young 7.73
- (England) Les Owen 7.44
- (England) Nick Nicholls 6.00
- (England) Ron Mountford 5.97
- (Poland) Kazimierz Bentke 5.10
- (England) Maury Mattingley 4.00
- (England) Jim Lightfoot 4.15

Ipswich

- (Australia) Peter Moore 8.90
- (Australia) Ray Cresp 8.39
- (England) Jimmy Squibb 6.36
- (England) Les McGillivray 6.34
- (England) Colin Gooddy 5.85
- (England) Jack Unstead 5.07
- (South Africa) Trevor Blokdyk 4.12
- (England) Len Silver 4.00
- (England) Dennis Day 2.29

Leicester

- (Scotland) Ken McKinlay 9.57
- (Poland) Paweł Waloszek 6.92
- (Australia) Jack Geran 6.47
- (England) Bryan Elliott 5.39
- (England) Charlie Barsby 5.33
- (England) Alf Hagon 4.12
- (England) Guy Allott 3.24
- (England) Dave Hankins 2.72
- (South Africa) Neil Mortimer 2.61

New Cross

- (England) Split Waterman 8.06
- (England) Tommy Sweetman 8.00
- (South Africa) Doug Davies 6.96
- (Wales) Eric Williams 6.54
- (England) Jimmy Gooch 6.44
- (Wales) Leo McAuliffe 6.17
- (England) Reg Luckhurst 4.96
- (Sweden) Bengt Brannefors 4.00
- (Guernsey) Johnny Fitzpatrick 4.33
- (England) Bobby Croombs 3.75

Norwich

- (Sweden) Ove Fundin 11.51
- (Australia) Johnny Chamberlain 7.77
- (England) Billy Bales 7.67
- (England) Dennis Newton 5.48
- (England) Derek Strutt 4.80
- (England) Reg Trott 4.37
- (England) John Debbage 3.90
- (Denmark) Kurt W. Petersen 3.45
- (England) Terry Betts 2.50
- (England) Harry Edwards 2.40
- (England) Trevor Hedge 0.00

Oxford

- (Denmark) Arne Pander 10.60
- (Australia) Jack Biggs 8.72
- (England) Ronnie Genz 8.16
- (Scotland) Gordon McGregor 6.56
- (England) Howdy Byford 5.33
- (England) Danny Dunton 5.27
- (England) Reg Duval 3.72
- (England) Jim Tebby 3.48
- (England) George Major 1.85
- (England) Roy Bowers 1.68

Southampton

- (Sweden) Björn Knutson 10.79
- (New Zealand) Barry Briggs 10.13
- (Australia) Jack Scott 8.80
- (Australia) Chum Taylor 7.83
- (England) Cyril Roger 6.73
- (England) Dick Bradley 5.59
- (Scotland) Ross Gilbertson 5.00
- (England) Alby Golden 4.55
- (Netherlands) Peter Vandenberg 4.29

Swindon

- (Australia) Neil Street 7.83
- (England) George White 7.82
- (Poland) Tadeusz Teodorowicz 7.52
- (England) Mike Broadbank 6.96
- (Wales) Ian Williams 6.22
- (Sweden) Arne Carlsson 6.00
- (England) Martin Ashby 6.00
- (England) Brian Meredith 5.39
- (England) Brian Brett 4.85
- (England) Bob Roger 1.00

Wimbledon

- (New Zealand) Ronnie Moore 11.17
- (England) Ron How 10.05
- (England) Bob Andrews 9.04
- (England) Jim Tebby 7.33
- (England) Cyril Maidment 7.17
- (England) Cyril Brine 7.14
- (England) Gerald Jackson 5.58
- (England) Gil Goldfinch 5.10
- (England) Roy Trigg 0.00

== See also ==
- List of United Kingdom Speedway League Champions
- Knockout Cup (speedway)
