= 1957 Speedway National League =

British motorcycle speedway season

- League: National League
- No. of competitors: 11
- Champions: Swindon Robins
- Britannia Cup: Belle Vue Aces
- Highest average: Peter Craven
- Division/s below: 1957 Southern Area League

The 1957 National League was the 23rd season and the twelfth post-war season of the highest tier of motorcycle speedway in Great Britain.

== Summary ==
The closure of Wembley Lions, Bradford Tudors and Poole Pirates left the league with only four teams, so the seven sides in Division Two merged to make an eleven-team first tier and so Division Two became defunct.

Bradford Tudors returned to replace Birmingham Brummies mid-season (in early August) and Swindon Robins followed up their Division Two title in 1956 with the Division One title in 1957.

== League ==
=== Final table ===
| Pos | Team | PL | W | D | L | Pts |
|---|---|---|---|---|---|---|
| 1 | Swindon Robins | 20 | 15 | 1 | 4 | 31 |
| 2 | Belle Vue Aces | 20 | 15 | 0 | 5 | 30 |
| 3 | Wimbledon Dons | 20 | 12 | 0 | 8 | 24 |
| 4 | Norwich Stars | 20 | 11 | 0 | 9 | 22 |
| 5 | Leicester Hunters | 20 | 10 | 1 | 9 | 21 |
| 6 | Southampton Saints | 20 | 9 | 0 | 11 | 18 |
| 7 | Bradford Tudors* | 20 | 9 | 0 | 11 | 18 |
| 8 | Coventry Bees | 20 | 9 | 0 | 11 | 18 |
| 9 | Oxford Cheetahs | 20 | 7 | 1 | 12 | 15 |
| 10 | Ipswich Witches | 20 | 6 | 0 | 14 | 12 |
| 11 | Rayleigh Rockets | 20 | 5 | 1 | 14 | 11 |

- Bradford Tudors replaced Birmingham Brummies mid-season.

=== Fixtures and results ===
| Home \ Away | BV | BB | COV | IPS | LEI | NOR | OX | RAY | SOT | SWI | WIM |
|---|---|---|---|---|---|---|---|---|---|---|---|
| Belle Vue | | 58–38 | 60–36 | 58–38 | 61–35 | 63–33 | 60–36 | 64–32 | 57–39 | 55–41 | 58–38 |
| Birmingham/Bradford | 20–22 | | 67–29 | 55–41 | 61–35 | 52–44 | 58–37 | 62–34 | 57–39 | 66–30 | 49–47 |
| Coventry | 44–51 | 50–46 | | 63–32 | 55–41 | 49–47 | 60–36 | 55–41 | 52–44 | 49–47 | 49–47 |
| Ipswich | 45–51 | 59–37 | 53–43 | | 41–55 | 46–50 | 54–41 | 67–29 | 48–47 | 47–49 | 46–50 |
| Leiceter | 52–44 | 56–40 | 54–42 | 42–54 | | 52–44 | 58–38 | 56–39 | 58–34 | 48–48 | 62–34 |
| Norwich | 47–49 | 59–37 | 68–28 | 69–27 | 52–44 | | 61–35 | 59–37 | 42–54 | 50–46 | 62–34 |
| Oxford | 50–46 | 53–43 | 54–42 | 50–46 | 46–50 | 47–49 | | 57–34 | 51–44 | 37–59 | 34–62 |
| Raleigh | 44–52 | 67–29 | 62–34 | 56–40 | 62–34 | 46–50 | 48–48 | | 47–49 | 38–58 | 39–56 |
| Southampton | 67–29 | 59–37 | 72–24 | 71–25 | 65–31 | 51–45 | 50–46 | 46–50 | | 47–49 | 47–48 |
| Swindon | 63–33 | 77–19 | 70–26 | 61–35 | 64–32 | 51–45 | 61–35 | 63–33 | 62–34 | | 55–41 |
| Wimbledon | 52–43 | 65–31 | 58–38 | 54–42 | 53–43 | 57–39 | 46–49 | 55–41 | 53–43 | 47–49 | |

Legend: Blue = home team win; Yellow = draw; Red = away team win.

== Top ten riders (league only) ==
| | Rider | Nat | Team | C.M.A. |
|---|---|---|---|---|
| 1 | Peter Craven | (England) | Belle Vue | 11.18 |
| 2 | Ove Fundin | (Sweden) | Norwich | 10.38 |
| 3 | Bob Roger | (England) | Swindon | 10.27 |
| 4 | Ron Johnston | (New Zealand) | Belle Vue | 10.27 |
| 5 | Barry Briggs | (New Zealand) | Wimbledon | 10.00 |
| 6 | Ken McKinlay | (Scotland) | Leicester | 9.77 |
| 7 | Brian Crutcher | (England) | Southampton | 9.76 |
| 8 | Aub Lawson | (Australia) | Norwich | 9.73 |
| 9 | Peter Moore | (Australia) | Ipswich | 9.64 |
| 10 | Dick Bradley | (England) | Southampton | 9.48 |

== National Trophy ==
The National Trophy was not held during 1957.

== Britannia Cup ==
South

| Team | PL | W | D | L | Pts |
|---|---|---|---|---|---|
| Norwich | 10 | 8 | 0 | 2 | 16 |
| Wimbledon | 10 | 7 | 0 | 3 | 14 |
| Southampton | 10 | 5 | 1 | 4 | 11 |
| Swindon | 10 | 4 | 0 | 6 | 8 |
| Ipswich | 10 | 3 | 0 | 7 | 6 |
| Rayleigh | 10 | 2 | 1 | 7 | 5 |

North

| Team | PL | W | D | L | Pts |
|---|---|---|---|---|---|
| Belle Vue | 8 | 5 | 2 | 1 | 12 |
| Oxford | 7 | 4 | 1 | 2 | 9 |
| Leicester | 8 | 4 | 0 | 4 | 8 |
| Coventry | 8 | 3 | 1 | 4 | 7 |
| Birmingham | 7 | 1 | 0 | 6 | 2 |

| Home \ Away | IPS | NOR | RAY | SOT | SWI | WIM |
|---|---|---|---|---|---|---|
| Ipswich | | 40–55 | 53–43 | 51–44 | 51–45 | 44–52 |
| Norwich | 59–37 | | 64–32 | 70–26 | 50–46 | 68–28 |
| Raleigh | 52–44 | 54–42 | | 43–52 | 46–50 | 34–62 |
| Southampton | 70–26 | 54–41 | 48–48 | | 57–39 | 55–41 |
| Swindon | 62–34 | 45–51 | 65–31 | 52–44 | | 40–54 |
| Wimbledon | 51–44 | 44–52 | 64–31 | 59–37 | 67–29 | |

Legend: Blue = home team win; Yellow = draw; Red = away team win.

| Home \ Away | BV | BB | COV | LEI | OX |
|---|---|---|---|---|---|
| Belle Vue | | 67–28 | 61–35 | 54–42 | 55–41 |
| Birmingham | 44–52 | | 39–57 | 57–39 | a–a |
| Coventry | 48–48 | 50–46 | | 49–47 | 43–53 |
| Leicester | 50–46 | 57–39 | 53–43 | | 50–46 |
| Oxford | 48–48 | 65–30 | 59–37 | 49–46 | |

Legend: Blue = home team win; Yellow = draw; Red = away team win.

Final

| Team one | Team two | Scores |
|---|---|---|
| Belle Vue | Norwich | 48–48, 50–46 |

== Riders and final averages ==
Belle Vue

- (England) Peter Craven 11.18
- (New Zealand) Ron Johnston 10.27
- (New Zealand) Bob Duckworth 6.92
- (England) Eddie Rigg 6.78
- (England) Dick Fisher 6.00
- (England) Tink Maynard 5.60
- (England) Peter Williams 4.71
- (England) Slant Payling 3.73
- (England) Brian Craven 3.24
- (England) Lew Grepp 0.73

Bradford/Birmingham

- (Sweden) Dan Forsberg 9.42
- (England) Nigel Boocock 7.92
- (England) Ron Clarke 7.84
- (England) Eric Boothroyd 7.37/6.78
- (England) Ron Mountford 7.23
- (England) Arthur Forrest 7.15
- (England) Al Allison 5.21
- (England) Guy Allott 5.19/4.93
- (England) Jim Tolley 5.05
- (New Zealand) Trevor Redmond 4.76
- (England) Harry Bastable 4.00
- (England) Derrick Tailby 3.20

Coventry

- (Sweden) Per Olof Söderman 8.43
- (England) Ron Mountford 8.07
- (England) Jim Lightfoot 6.53
- (New Zealand) Charlie New 6.34
- (England) Reg Duval 6.04
- (England) Les Owen 4.00
- (England) Nick Nicholls 3.35
- (England) Jim Tolley 3.31
- (England) Eric Hockaday 3.07
- (England) Arthur Wright 2.81
- (Scotland) Bob Mark 2.30

Ipswich

- (Australia) Peter Moore 9.64
- (England) Cyril Roger 9.13
- (Norway) Aage Hansen 8.17
- (Australia) Bob Sharp 6.04
- (England) Bert Edwards 5.36
- (Australia) Junior Bainbridge 4.67
- (England) Jimmy Gooch 4.09
- (England) Wal Morton 3.79
- (England) Danny Dunton 3.84
- (Guernsey) Johnny Fitzpatrick 3.03
- (England) Len Silver 2.82
- (England) Ken Last 1.00

Leicester

- (Scotland) Ken McKinlay 9.77
- (Sweden) Rune Sörmander 8.40
- (Australia) Jack Geran 8.04
- (England) Alf Hagon 6.71
- (England) Harry Bastable 6.47
- (England) Al Allison 4.67
- (England) Charlie Barsby 3.88
- (England) Bryan Elliott 3.31
- (England) Reg Fearman 3.25
- (England) Vic Hall 1.54
- (England) Des Haswell 0.62

Norwich

- (Sweden) Ove Fundin 10.38
- (Australia) Aub Lawson 9.73
- (England) Phil Clarke 9.41
- (England) Billy Bales 7.60
- (England) Harry Edwards 5.87
- (England) Geoff Pymar 3.91
- (England) Derek Strutt 3.68
- (England) Dave Hankins 2.75
- (England) Reg Trott 2.58
- (England) Barry East 2.33
- (England) Wal Morton 2.05

Oxford

- (Australia) Jack Biggs 8.38
- (Scotland) Gordon McGregor 6.92
- (England) Ronnie Genz 7.81
- (England) Dennis Newton 6.29
- (England) Roy Bowers 5.51
- (England) Howdy Byford 5.10
- (Australia) Ray Cresp 5.00
- (England) Maury McDermott 4.00
- (England) Frank Johnson 3.64

Rayleigh

- (England) Les McGillivray 8.00
- (England) Jack Unstead 6.93
- (Sweden) Birger Forsberg 6.38
- (England) Ken Adams 5.98
- (Republic of Ireland) Eric French 5.97
- (New Zealand) Peter Clark 5.91
- (England) Pete Lansdale 5.40
- (England) Maury McDermott 3.72

Southampton

- (England) Brian Crutcher 9.76
- (England) Dick Bradley 9.48
- (England) Brian Hanham 7.17
- (England) Alby Golden 6.00
- (England) Maury Mattingley 5.68
- (England) Bill Holden 5.54
- (England) Jimmy Squibb 5.03
- (England) Johnny Hole 5.06

Swindon

- (England) Bob Roger 10.27
- (England) George White 8.61
- (Wales) Ian Williams 8.17
- (England) Ken Middleditch 7.54
- (Australia) Neil Street 6.70
- (England) Ernie Lessiter 6.44
- (England) Al Sparrey 6.40
- (England) Mike Broadbank 5.21

Wimbledon

- (New Zealand) Barry Briggs 10.00
- (England) Ron How 8.31
- (New Zealand) Ronnie Moore 8.00
- (England) Gerald Jackson 7.29
- (England) Cyril Maidment 6.52
- (England) Cyril Brine 6.04
- (England) Split Waterman 5.86
- (England) Gerry King 4.00
- (New Zealand) Ivan Mauger 4.00
- (England) Bob Andrews 3.76

== See also ==
- List of United Kingdom Speedway League Champions
- Knockout Cup (speedway)
