= 1958 Speedway National League =

British motorcycle speedway season

- League: National League
- No. of competitors: 10
- Champions: Wimbledon Dons
- National Trophy: Belle Vue Aces
- Britannia Cup: Belle Vue Aces
- Highest average: Ove Fundin

The 1958 National League was the 24th season and the thirteenth post-war season of the highest tier of motorcycle speedway in Great Britain.

== Summary ==
Bradford Tudors who had dropped out at the start of the previous season only to return in mid-season, had dropped out again. Promoter Vic Gooden moved the entire promotion and team of Rayleigh Rockets to Poole Pirates.

Wimbledon Dons won their fourth title in five years.

== League ==
=== Final table ===
Pos	Team	PL	W	D	L	Pts
1	Wimbledon Dons	18	12	2	4	26
2	Norwich Stars	18	12	0	6	24
3	Southampton Saints	18	11	0	7	22
4	Leicester Hunters	18	11	0	7	22
5	Belle Vue Aces	18	10	0	8	20
6	Swindon Robins	18	10	0	8	20
7	Coventry Bees	18	9	1	8	19
8	Oxford Cheetahs	18	5	2	11	12
9	Poole Pirates	18	6	0	12	12
10	Ipswich Witches	18	1	1	16	3

=== Fixtures and results ===
Home \ Away	BV	COV	IPS	LEI	NOR	OX	PP	SOT	SWI	WIM
Belle Vue		52–44	63–33	63–33	57–39	66–30	73–23	65–31	47–48	51–45
Coventry	57–39		69–26	47–49	51–45	64–32	45–51	53–43	61–35	44–52
Ipswich	45–51	38–58		45–51	39–57	45–51	59–37	42–54	46–50	48–48
Leicester	46–50	58–38	61–35		58–38	56–40	52–44	52–44	49–47	54–42
Norwich	54–42	62–34	59–37	54–42		61–35	65–31	58–38	59–37	50–46
Oxford	50–46	48–48	54–42	46–50	46–49		53–43	55–40	47–49	48–48
Poole	54–42	39–57	56–40	48–47	30–66	58–38		45–51	49–47	33–63
Southampton	67–29	60–36	71–25	54–42	51–45	63–33	56–40		55–41	49–47
Swindon	56–40	41–54	66–30	57–39	50–46	56–40	66–30	56–40		42–54
Wimbledon	64–32	63–33	64–32	66–30	58–38	59–37	53–43	54–42	65–31	

Legend: Blue = home team win; Yellow = draw; Red = away team win.

== Top ten riders (league only) ==
	Rider	Nat	Team	C.M.A.
1	Ove Fundin	(Sweden)	Norwich	11.60
2	Peter Craven	(England)	Belle Vue	11.00
3	Ken McKinlay	(Scotland)	Leicester	10.82
4	Barry Briggs	(New Zealand)	Wimbledon	10.43
5	Brian Crutcher	(England)	Southampton	10.03
6	Jack Young	(Australia)	Coventry	10.02
7	Peter Moore	(Australia)	Ipswich	9.73
8	Jack Biggs	(Australia)	Poole	9.69
9	Ron How	(England)	Wimbledon	9.47
10	Ronnie Moore	(New Zealand)	Wimbledon	9.09

== National Trophy ==
The 1958 National Trophy was the 20th edition of the Knockout Cup. Belle Vue were the winners.

First round

Date	Team one	Score	Team two
30/05	Leicester	65-54	Southampton
29/05	Oxford	58-61	Poole
27/05	Southampton	84-36	Leicester
26/05	Poole	60-60	Oxford

Second round

Date	Team one	Score	Team two
03/07	Ipswich	42-77	Swindon
30/06	Poole	49-71	Belle Vue
30/06	Wimbledon	67-53	Norwich
28/06	Belle Vue	80-40	Poole
28/06	Coventry	57-63	Southampton
28/06	Norwich	72-48	Wimbledon
28/06	Swindon	78-42	Ipswich
24/06	Southampton	78-42	Coventry

Semifinals

Date	Team one	Score	Team two
16/08	Norwich	69-51	Swindon
12/08	Southampton	60-59	Belle Vue
09/08	Belle Vue	77-43	Southampton
09/08	Swindon	60-60	Norwich

=== Final ===
First leg

11 September 1958

Belle Vue Aces Peter Craven 16 Ron Johnston 11 Dick Fisher 9 Eddie Rigg 8 Bob Duckworth 7 Bob McHugh 7 Slant Payling 6 Tink Maynard 4 Graham Beattie 4 Jack Kitchen 2	74 – 45	Norwich Stars Ove Fundin 16 Phil Clarke 8 Billy Bales 8 Aub Lawson 5 John Chamberlain 3 Clive Featherby 2 Dennis Newton 2 Jimmy Heard 1 Tommy Sweetman 0 Harry Edwards 0

Hyde Road Stadium

Second leg

13 September 1958

Norwich Stars Ove Fundin 16 Billy Bales 10 Aub Lawson 5 Phil Clarke 4 Harry Edwards 4 John Chamberlain 8 Clive Featherby 4 Jimmy Heard 3 Tommy Sweetman 3 Dennis Newton 1	58 – 62	Belle Vue Aces Ron Johnston 10 Bob Duckworth 7 Peter Craven 15 Slant Payling 10 Dick Fisher 10 Tink Maynard 4 Eddie Rigg 2 Jack Kitchen 0 Graham Beattie 3 Bob McHugh 1

The Firs Stadium

Belle Vue were National Trophy Champions, winning on aggregate 136–103.

== Britannia Cup ==
South

Team	PL	W	D	L	Pts
Wimbledon	8	8	0	0	16
Swindon	8	4	0	4	8
Southampton	8	4	0	4	8
Norwich	8	3	0	5	6
Poole	8	1	0	7	2

North

Team	PL	W	D	L	Pts
Belle Vue	8	8	0	0	16
Coventry	8	4	0	4	8
Ipswich	8	3	1	4	7
Leicester	8	3	0	5	6
Oxford	8	1	1	6	3

Home \ Away	NOR	PP	SOT	SWI	WIM
Norwich		62–33	55–41	45–51	47–48
Poole	53–43		44–52	28–68	47–49
Southampton	64–32	58–38		57–39	46–50
Swindon	47–49	52–44	64–31		42–54
Wimbledon	53–43	68–28	58–38	65–31	

Legend: Blue = home team win; Yellow = draw; Red = away team win.

Home \ Away	BV	COV	IPS	LEI	OX
Belle Vue		67–29	34–26	54.5–40.5	56–40
Coventry	41–55		45–51	51–45	60–36
Ipswich	46–50	52–44		43–53	54–42
Leicester	42–54	46–50	51–45		60–36
Oxford	47–48	36–60	48–48	55–41	

Legend: Blue = home team win; Yellow = draw; Red = away team win.

Final

Team one	Team two	Scores
Wimbledon	Belle Vue	49–47, 43–53

== Riders and final averages ==
Belle Vue

- (England) Peter Craven 11.00
- (New Zealand) Ron Johnston 7.90
- (England) Dick Fisher 7.76
- (England) Slant Payling 6.45
- (England) Eddie Rigg 6.41
- (New Zealand) Bob Duckworth 6.40
- (England) Tink Maynard 5.33
- (England) Peter Williams 5.28
- (England) Jack Kitchen 1.25
- (England) Graham Beattie 0.80

Coventry

- (Australia) Jack Young 10.02
- (England) Arthur Forrest 8.00
- (Sweden) Per Olof Söderman 7.78
- (England) Jim Lightfoot 6.88
- (England) Ron Mountford 6.64
- (England) Maury Mattingley 5.47
- (England) Reg Duval 4.89
- (England) Nick Nicholls 4.46
- (England) Les Owen 2.62

Ipswich

- (Australia) Peter Moore 9.73
- (Australia) Ray Cresp 6.39
- (England) Nigel Boocock 4.93
- (England) Tich Read (George Snailum) 3.89
- (England) Jim Tebby 3.89
- (England) Danny Dunton 3.81
- (Australia) Bob Sharp 3.58
- (England) Bert Edwards 3.50
- (England) Jimmy Gooch 3.00

Leicester

- (Scotland) Ken McKinlay 10.82
- (Australia) Jack Geran 9.08
- (England) Gerry Hussey 7.65
- (England) Bryan Elliott 5.46
- (England) Alf Hagon 4.62
- (England) Charlie Barsby 4.38
- (England) Harry Bastable 3.89
- (England) Guy Allott 2.86

Norwich

- (Sweden) Ove Fundin 11.60
- (Australia) Aub Lawson 9.08
- (England) Billy Bales 8.20
- (England) Phil Clarke 7.19
- (England) Dennis Newton 7.03
- (England) Harry Edwards 5.44
- (Australia) Johnny Chamberlain 4.76
- (England) Reg Trott 4.30
- (England) Arne Hendriksen 3.48
- (England) Tich Read (George Snailum) 3.20
- (England) Derek Strutt 2.35
- (England) Clive Featherby 0.00

Oxford

- (New Zealand) Charlie New 7.40
- (Scotland) Gordon McGregor 7.26
- (England) Howdy Byford 6.75
- (England) Ronnie Genz 6.48
- (England) Arthur Wright 6.43
- (England) Reg Duval 5.37
- (England) Eric Boothroyd 5.35
- (England) Dennis Newton 5.14
- (England) Roy Bowers 4.24
- (England) Colin Gooddy 2.00
- (England) Brian Miller 1.60

Poole

- (Australia) Jack Biggs 9.69
- (Sweden) Birger Forsberg 7.11
- (England) Les McGillivray 6.23
- (England) Ken Middleditch 6.12
- (England) Jack Unstead 5.75
- (South Africa) Trevor Blokdyk 4.76
- (England) Ken Adams 4.48
- (England) Bill Holden 4.31
- (England) Terry Small 3.91
- (England) Maury McDermott 3.16

Southampton

- (England) Brian Crutcher 10.03
- (England) Dick Bradley 8.39
- (Australia) Chum Taylor 7.73
- (England) Split Waterman 7.47
- (England) Brian Hanham 6.57
- (England) Jimmy Squibb 6.33
- (England) Alby Golden 5.74
- (Wales) Leo McAuliffe 5.60
- (England) Johnny Hole 5.25
- (England) Ron Walton 3.67
- (England) Brian Brett 3.40

Swindon

- (England) George White 8.36
- (Wales) Ian Williams 8.34
- (England) Mike Broadbank 8.32
- (Australia) Neil Street 8.00
- (England) Roy Taylor 6.15
- (England) Al Sparrey 4.47
- (England) Ernie Lessiter 3.89
- (Australia) Maury Conway 2.62
- (England) Roy Moreton 2.48

Wimbledon

- (New Zealand) Barry Briggs 10.43
- (England) Ron How 9.47
- (New Zealand) Ronnie Moore 9.09
- (England) Gerald Jackson 6.76
- (England) Cyril Maidment 6.73
- (England) Cyril Brine 6.41
- (England) Bob Andrews 5.82
- (England) Gerry King 1.09

== See also ==
- List of United Kingdom Speedway League Champions
- Knockout Cup (speedway)
