= 1962 Speedway National League =

British motorcycle speedway season

- League: National League
- No. of competitors: 7
- Champions: Southampton Saints
- National Trophy: Wimbledon Dons
- Highest average: Ronnie Moore
- Division/s below: 1962 Provincial League

The 1962 National League was the 28th season and the seventeenth post-war season of the highest tier of motorcycle speedway in Great Britain.

== Summary ==
With the withdrawal of New Cross Rangers and with Leicester Hunters moving down to the Provincial League, the entry list was 8 teams and so home and away fixtures were raced twice. Southampton Saints broke the domination of Wimbledon Dons by winning their first National League title.

Ipswich Witches' season was a complete disaster. Their new signing Olle Nygren did not even start the season due to ill-health and then Jack Unstead was killed in the first recorded fatal crash at Foxhall Stadium, on 13 April 1962. The club later withdrew from the league due to financial issues and their results were expunged.

== League ==
=== Final table ===
Pos	Team	PL	W	D	L	Pts
1	Southampton Saints	24	18	0	6	36
2	Wimbledon Dons	24	14	1	9	29
3	Coventry Bees	24	13	0	11	26
4	Belle Vue Aces	24	12	0	12	24
5	Norwich Stars	24	12	0	12	24
6	Swindon Robins	24	9	2	13	20
7	Oxford Cheetahs	24	4	0	20	8

- Ipswich Witches resigned in mid-season.

=== Fixtures and results ===
A fixtures

Home \ Away	BV	COV	IPS	NOR	OX	SOT	SWI	WIM
Belle Vue		29–49	38–40	51–27	44–34	42–36	43–35	34–44
Coventry	59–18		47–31	45–33	46–31	37–41	48–30	40–38
Ipswich	41–37	29–49		22–56	38–40	27–51	44–34	38–40
Norwich	37–41	35–43	n/a		50–28	42–36	51–26	35–43
Oxford	38–40	42–36	n/a	35–43		34–44	37–40	34.5–43.5
Southampton	46–32	50–28	60–18	53–25	60–18		48–30	46–32
Swindon	44–33	45–33	57–21	44–34	40–38	36–41		39–39
Wimbledon	52–26	43.5–34.5	52–26	54–24	53–25	47–30	59–19	

Legend: Blue = home team win; Yellow = draw; Red = away team win.

B fixtures

Home \ Away	BV	COV	IPS	NOR	OX	SOT	SWI	WIM
Belle Vue		41–37	n/a	38–40	47–31	43–35	40–38	44–34
Coventry	48–30		n/a	53–25	55–23	47–31	45–33	46–32
Ipswich	n/a	n/a		n/a	40–38	n/a	n/a	n/a
Norwich	46–32	40–38	n/a		52–26	47–31	50–28	40–38
Oxford	33–45	47–31	n/a	40–38		24–54	41–37	24–54
Southampton	49–29	52–26	n/a	58–20	59–19		42–35	53–25
Swindon	39–39	40–37	n/a	43–35	42–36	31–47		44–34
Wimbledon	53–25	46–31	42–36	38–40	49–29	36–42	47–31	

Legend: Blue = home team win; Yellow = draw; Red = away team win.

=== Top ten riders (league only) ===
	Rider	Nat	Team	C.M.A.
1	Ronnie Moore	(New Zealand)	Wimbledon	10.14
2	Björn Knutson	(Sweden)	Southampton	9.89
3	Olle Nygren	(Sweden)	Swindon/Norwich	9.86
4	Peter Craven	(England)	Belle Vue	9.75
5	Barry Briggs	(New Zealand)	Southampton	9.64
6	Ove Fundin	(Sweden)	Norwich	9.30
7	Ron How	(England)	Wimbledon	9.30
8	Peter Moore	(Australia)	Ipswich/Swindon	9.02
9	Bob Andrews	(New Zealand)	Wimbledon	8.82
10	Ron Mountford	(England)	Coventry	8.74

== National Trophy ==
The 1962 National Trophy was the 24th edition of the Knockout Cup. Wimbledon were the winners.

First round

Date	Team one	Score	Team two
25/06	Wimbledon	49-35	Belle Vue
23/06	Belle Vue	46-38	Wimbledon
23/06	Swindon	51-33	Ipswich
22/06	Ipswich	42-40	Swindon
19/06	Southampton	56-28	Coventry
16/06	Norwich	33-51	Oxford
14/06	Oxford	47-37	Norwich
16/06	Coventry	41-43	Southampton

Semi-finals

Date	Team one	Score	Team two
23/08	Oxford	45-39	Swindon
18/08	Swindon	59-25	Oxford
14/08	Southampton	42-42	Wimbledon
13/08	Wimbledon	50-33	Southampton

=== Final ===
First leg

24 September 1962

Wimbledon Dons Ronnie Moore 14 Ron How 14 Bob Andrews 11 Gerry Jackson 7 Cyril Brine 5 Leo McAuliffe 3 Jim Tebby 1	55 – 29	Swindon Robins Mike Broadbank 9 Arne Carlsson 7 Ian Williams 4 Martin Ashby 3 Peter Moore 3 Brian Brett 2 Neil Street 1

Wimbledon Stadium

Second leg

29 September 1962

Swindon Robins Martin Ashby 15 Mike Broadbank 7 Peter Moore 7 Arne Carlsson 6 Neil Street 5 Ian Williams 3 Brian Brett 2	45 – 39	Wimbledon Dons Ronnie Moore 13 Ron How 12 Bob Andrews 9 Cyril Brine 3 Gerry Jackson 2 Jim Tebby 0 Leo McAuliffe 0

Abbey Stadium

Wimbledon were National Trophy Champions, winning on aggregate 94–74.

== Riders & final averages ==
Belle Vue

- (England) Peter Craven 9.75
- (Sweden) Sören Sjösten 8.23
- (England) Cyril Maidment 7.95
- (England) Dick Fisher 7.33
- (England) Split Waterman 4.44
- (New Zealand) Bob Duckworth 4.00
- (England) Jim Yacoby 3.67
- (England) Bernard McArthur 3.60
- (England) Jack Kitchen 3.27
- (England) Peter Kelly 3.17
- (England) Bill Powell 2.50
- (England) Nick Nicholls 2.33

Coventry

- (England) Ron Mountford 8.74
- (Scotland) Ken McKinlay 8.63
- (England) Nigel Boocock 8.20
- (England) Les Owen 7.61
- (England) Jim Lightfoot 6.33
- (England) Bryan Elliott 6.11
- (England) Les McGillivray 5.33
- (England) Rick France 4.47
- (England) Peter Brough 3.35

Ipswich (resigned mid season)

- (Australia) Peter Moore 8.73
- (England) Split Waterman 6.63
- (England) Colin Gooddy 6.06
- (England) Bob Dugard 6.00
- (England) Les McGillivray 5.85
- (Sweden) Leif Larsson 5.17
- (Sweden) Bengt Brannefors 4.44
- (England) Sandy McGillivray 2.24
- (South Africa) Trevor Blokdyk 3.33
- (England) John Mills 1.33
- (England) Jack Unstead n/a

Norwich

- (Sweden) Olle Nygren 9.80
- (Sweden) Ove Fundin 9.30
- (England) Terry Betts 6.78
- (England) Jimmy Gooch 6.49
- (England) Reg Trott 6.07
- (England) John Debbage 5.56
- (England) Billy Bales 5.48
- (England) Trevor Hedge 4.67
- (Wales) Eric Williams 4.39
- (England) Derek Strutt 2.74
- (England) Ken Last 2.67

Oxford

- (England) Ronnie Genz 6.91
- (Australia) Jack Geran 6.88
- (England) Alf Hagon 5.84
- (England) Reg Duval 5.56
- (England) Colin Gooddy 5.20
- (Scotland) Gordon McGregor 5.20
- (Sweden) Per Tage Svensson 4.93
- (Australia) Jack Biggs 4.42
- (England) John Bishop 2.73

Southampton

- (Sweden) Björn Knutson 9.89
- (New Zealand) Barry Briggs 9.64
- (England) Cyril Roger 7.49
- (England) Alby Golden 7.33
- (Netherlands) Peter Vandenberg 7.10
- (England) Reg Luckhurst 6.54
- (England) Dick Bradley 6.37

Swindon

- (Australia) Peter Moore 9.71
- (England) Mike Broadbank 8.27
- (England) Brian Meredith 8.00
- (Australia) Neil Street 6.94
- (Wales) Ian Williams 6.21
- (Sweden) Arne Carlsson 6.00
- (England) Brian Brett 5.62
- (Poland) Tadeusz Teodorowicz 5.30
- (England) Martin Ashby 4.45
- (England) Buster Brown 2.67

Wimbledon

- (New Zealand) Ronnie Moore 10.14
- (England) Ron How 9.30
- (England) Bob Andrews 8.82
- (England) Gerald Jackson 7.03
- (England) Ernie Baker 6.50
- (England) Cyril Brine 6.00
- (England) Roy Trigg 5.14
- (Wales) Leo McAuliffe 4.82
- (England) Jim Tebby 3.35

== See also ==
- List of United Kingdom Speedway League Champions
- Knockout Cup (speedway)
