= 1960 Individual Speedway World Championship =

Motorcycle speedway world championship

Seasons
- ← 1959 1961 →

The 1960 Individual Speedway World Championship was the 15th edition of the official World Championship to determine the world champion rider.

The final was held on 17 September, in front of a 70,000 crowd at Wembley Stadium. In an extremely competitive final three riders tied for first place on 14 points before Ove Fundin won the ride off to claim his second world title. In the ride off Fundin defeated defending champion Ronnie Moore and former champion Peter Craven. Craven had earlier set a track record of 68.8 seconds in his first race.

== First Round ==
Qualification results.

=== Norwegian qualifying ===
- 25 June 1959
- (Norway) Geiteryggen Speedwaybane, Skien
- Top 7 to Nordic qualification 1960

Pos.	Rider	Points
1	Aage Hansen	15
2	Rolf Westerberg	14
3	Thorbjorn Nygaard	12
4	Reidar Kristoffersen	10
5	Roger Steen	10
6	Oddvar Kristiansen	9
7	Arne Kristiansen	9
8	Oystein Mellerud	8
9	Tore Melbye	6
10	Roger Hansen	5
11	Sverre Harrfeldt	5
12	Egil H. Kruke	4
13	Gunnar Skjetne	4
14	Egil Bratvold	2
15	Per Aulie	2
16	Svein Johnsen	2

=== Finnish qualifying ===
- 27 July 1959
- (Finland) Eteläpuisto, Tampere
- First 2 (+seeded riders) to Nordic qualification 1960

Pos.	Rider	Points
1	Pertti Mikkola	15
2	Kalevi Lahtinen	13
3	Olavi Turunen	13
4	Timo Laine	9
5	Raimo Orastie	9
6	Aulis Lehtonen	9
7	Antti Mattila	8
8	Esko Koponen	7
9	Yrjo Vuori	7
10	Antero Salasto	7
11	Pertti Petersohn	6
12	Valle Seliverstov	5
13	Martti Assinen	4
14	Heikki Sorri	3
15	Nils Staaf	3
16	Martti Koivuoja	2

=== Swedish qualifying ===
- 1 May 1960
- Gamla Speedway Track, Visby
- Top 8 to Nordic qualification

Pos.	Rider	Points
1	Rune Sörmander	14
2	Olle Nygren	12
3	Alf Jonsson	11
4	Curt Eldh	11
5	Sören Sjösten	10
6	Åke Andersson	10
7	Evert Andersson	10
8	Björn Knutson	9
9	Joel Jansson	9
10	Bert Lindarw	5
11	Bengt Brannefors	5
12	Inge Gustafsson	4
13	Thorvald Karlsson	4
14	Olle Andersson	4
15	Per-Tage Svensson	1
16	Per-Åke Lundgren	1
17	Bengt Fransson	0
18	Jan Ekeroth	0

- 5 May 1960
- Hammarby IP, Stockholm
- Top 7 to Nordic qualification

Pos.	Rider	Points
1	Göran Norlén	15
2	Göte Nordin	13
3	Bertil Strid	11
4	Curt Nyqvist	10
5	Kjell Wårenius	10
6	Bernt Nilsson	10
7	Hans Hallberg	9
8	Bengt Eriksson	7
9	Birger Forsberg	7
10	Agnar Stenlund	6
11	Kjell Lutteman	6
12	Leif Larsson	4
13	Olle Segerström	4
14	Göran Carlsson	4
15	Thore Kindstrand	3
16	Per-Åke Lundgren	1
17	Åke Östblom	0
18	Jan Ekeroth	0

=== Continental quarter-finals ===
Date	Venue	Winner	2nd	3rd
22 May	(Socialist Federal Republic of Yugoslavia) Kajzerica, Zagreb	Florian Kapała	Jan Malinowski	Joachim Maj
22 May	(Czechoslovakia) Pavlovičky Stadion, Liberec	František Richter	Stefan Kepa	Stanislav Svoboda
22 May	(Poland) Alfred Smoczyk Stadium, Leszno	Bernard Kacperak	Konstanty Pociejkewicz	Pawel Waloszek
30 May	(Austria) ASKÖ-X-Platz, Vienna	Josef Bössner	Henryk Żyto	Antonín Kasper Sr.

== Second round ==
=== British & Commonwealth qualifying ===
- Top 64 riders to British second round

Date	Venue	Winner	2nd	3rd
2 June	Owlerton Stadium	Dennis Newton	Eric Hockaday	Tink Maynard
4 June	Sun Street Stadium	Reg Fearman	Reg Luckhurst	Alan Smith
4 June	Old Meadowbank	Guy Allott	Gil Goldfinch	Tony Robinson
6 June	Stanley Stadium	Peter Vandenberg	Ken Adams	Nick Nicholls
10 June	Rayleigh Weir Stadium	Reg Reeves	Alan Smith	Stan Stevens
10 June	Knowle Stadium	Ernie Baker	Johnny Hole	Maury Mattingley
11 June	Dudley Wood Stadium	Maury Mattingley	Reg Reeves	Gil Goldfinch
11 June	Odsal Stadium	Charlie Barsby	Danny Dunton	Ken Adams
15 June	Wimborne Road	Dennis Newton	Ron Taylor	Alan Kidd

=== Nordic Qualification ===
- 26 May 1960
- (Denmark) Selskov Stadium, Hillerød
- Top 8 to Nordic final

Pos.	Rider	Points
1	Alf Jonsson	14
2	Björn Knutson	12
3	Aage Hansen	13
4	Rune Sörmander	11
5	Sverre Harrfeldt	10
6	Joel Jansson	9
7	Arne Pander	9
8	Evert Andersson	9
9	Erik Kastebo	7
10	Nils Paulsen	6
11	Kurt W. Petersen	6
12	Arne Kristiansen	4
13	Åke Andersson	3
14	Hans Peter Boisen	3
15	Odvar Kristiansen	1
16	Öystein Mellerud	0
17	Curt Eldh	dns

- 26 May 1960

(Finland) Helsinki Velodrome, Helsinki

- Top 8 to Nordic final

Pos.	Rider	Points
1	Olle Nygren	`3
2	Göte Nordin	12
3	Curt Nyqvist	12
4	Kjell Wårenius	10
5	Bernt Nilsson	10
6	Bertil Strid	
7	Rolf Westerberg	9
8	Göran Norlén	9
9	Hans Hallberg	7
10	Antti Pajari	6
11	Kalevi Lahtinen	6
12	Thorbjörn Nygaar	5
13	Timo Laine	5
14	Aluis Tuominen	4
15	Valle Seliverstov	2
16	Pertti Mikkola	0

=== Continental semi-final ===
- 26 June 1960
- (Czechoslovakia) Slaný Speedway Stadium, Slaný
- Top 8 to Continental final

Pos.	Rider	Points
1	Stanislav Svoboda	14
2	Jaroslav Volf	12
3	Frantisek Richter	11
4	Mieczyslaw Polukard	11
5	Pawel Waloszek	10
6	Bedrich Slany	9
7	Marian Kaiser	9
8	Stefan Rurarz	9
9	Bronislaw Rogal	8
10	Kazimierz Bentke	7
11	Bohumil Rendek	6
12	Konstanty Pociejkewicz	5
13	Bernard Kasperak	5
14	Bohumír Bartoněk	2
15	Stefan Kępa	2
16	Edmund Migoś	2

- 26 June
- (West Germany) BBM Stadium, Munich
- Top 8 to Continental final

Pos.	Rider	Points
1	Josef Hofmeister	15
2	Jan Malinowski	13
3	Florian Kapala	13
4	Luboš Tomíček Sr.	12
5	Stefan Kwoczala	10
6	Henryk Zyto	9
7	Joachim Maj	9
8	Josef Seidl	9
9	Antonín Kasper Sr.	7
10	Marian Philipp	6
11	Josef Bössner	5
12	Józef Wieczorek	4
13	Karel Prusa	3
14	Alois Frach	3
15	Zdenek Rott	2
16	Fred Aberl	1
17	Edward Luther	0

== Third round ==
- Ove Fundin – seeded to European Final

=== British & Commonwealth Second round ===
- To 32 to British & Commonwealth semi-finals

Date	Venue	Winner	2nd	3rd
2 July	Hyde Road	Peter Craven	Dick Fisher	Ronnie Genz
2 July	Abbey Stadium	Chum Taylor	Ray Cresp	Mike Broadbank
4 July	Wimbledon Stadium	Ron How	Jack Young	Alf Hagon
5 July	Banister Court Stadium	Neil Street	Jack Biggs	Bryan Elliott
6 July	New Cross Stadium	Barry Briggs	Neil Street	Ron Johnston
7 July	Foxhall Stadium	Peter Craven	Nigel Boocock	Jim Lightfoot
7 July	Oxford Stadium	Mike Broadbank	Ronnie Genz	Les McGillivray
8 July	Leicester Stadium	Barry Briggs	Ken McKinlay	Jack Geran
9 July	Brandon Stadium	Ken McKinlay	Jack Young	Les Owen
9 July	The Firs Stadium	Ron How	Billy Bales	Aub Lawson

=== Nordic Final ===
- 16 June 1960
- (Norway) Dælenenga idrettspark, Oslo
- First 7 to European Final plus 1 reserve

Pos.	Rider	Heat Scores	Total
1	(Sweden) Olle Nygren		14+3
2	(Sweden) Göte Nordin		14+2
3	(Norway) Aage Hansen		13
4	(Sweden) Rune Sörmander		12
5	(Sweden) Curt Nyqvist		10
6	(Sweden) Björn Knutson		10
7	(Sweden) Göran Norlén		9
8	(Sweden) Alf Jonsson		9
9	(Denmark) Arne Pander		6
10	(Norway) Sverre Harrfeldt		5
11	(Sweden) Kjell Warenius		5
12	(Sweden) Evert Andersson		4
13	(Sweden) Bernt Nilsson		3
14	(Sweden) Hans Hallberg		2
15	(Norway) Rolf Westerberg		2
16	(Sweden) Joel Jansson		2
R1	(Sweden) Bertil Strid		0

=== Continental Final ===
- 3 July 1960
- (Austria) Stadion Wien, Vienna
- First 8 to European Final

Placing	Rider	Total	1	2	3	4	5	6	7	8	9	10	11	12	13	14	15	16	17	18	19	20	Pts	Pos	21
1	(West Germany) (10) Josef Hofmeister	13			1			3						3			3		3				13	1	
2	(Poland) (1) Henryk Żyto	11	3				3				2				2				1				11	2	3
3	(Poland) (9) Marian Kaiser	11			3		1						2					2		3			11	3	2
4	(Czechoslovakia) (6) František Richter	11		3				1			1							3			3		11	4	1
5	(Poland) (2) Stefan Kwoczała	10	2					2				2				2				2			10	5	
6	(Poland) (5) Mieczysław Połukard	10		1			2					3					1					3	10	6	
7	(Poland) (7) Jan Malinowski	9		2					2					1	3					1			9	7	
8	(Czechoslovakia) (3) Stanislav Svoboda	9	0						3				3				2				1		9	8	
9	(Czechoslovakia) (13) Luboš Tomíček	8				3	0							2		3					0		8	9	
10	(Poland) (16) Stanislaw Rurarz	7				2				2	3						0			0			7	10	
11	(Czechoslovakia) (12) Jaroslaw Volf	6			2					1		0			1						2		6	11	
12	(Poland) (15) Pawel Waloszek	5				1			0			1						1	2				5	12	
13	(Poland) (11) Florian Kapała	4			0				1		0					1						2	4	13	
14	(West Germany) (4) Josef Seidl	4	1							3				0				0				0	4	14	
15	(Czechoslovakia) (14) Bedřich Slaný	1				0		0					1		F							-	1	15	
16	(Poland) (8) Joachim Maj	0		0						0			0			0			0				0	16	
R1	(Austria) (R1) Ernest Luttenberger	0																				1	0	R1	
Placing	Rider	Total	1	2	3	4	5	6	7	8	9	10	11	12	13	14	15	16	17	18	19	20	Pts	Pos	21

m - exclusion for exceeding two minute time allowance • t - exclusion for touching the tapes • x - other exclusion • e - retired or mechanical failure • f - fell • ns - non-starter • nc - non-classify

gate A - inside	gate B	gate C	gate D - outside

== Fourth round ==
- Ronnie Moore – seeded to World Final

=== British & Commonwealth semi finals ===
Top 9 riders based on points accumulated over two rides would progress to world final

Date	Venue	Winner	2nd	3rd
8 August	Wimbledon Stadium	Peter Craven	Barry Briggs	Eric Williams
13 August	Brandon Stadium	Ron How	Peter Moore	Aub Lawson
13 August	The Firs Stadium	Peter Craven	Ken McKinlay	Bob Andrews
16 August	Banister Court Stadium	Ken McKinlay	Jack Young]	Ron How

Pos.	Rider	Points
1	(England) Peter Craven	30
2	(England) Ron How	28
3	(Scotland) Ken McKinlay	28
4	(New Zealand) Barry Briggs	24
5	(Australia) Peter Moore	24
6	(Australia) Jack Young	24
7	(New Zealand) Ron Johnston	23
8	(Wales) Eric Williams	23
9	(Australia) Aub Lawson	23
10	(England) Bryan Elliott	22
11	(Australia) Chum Taylor	20
12	(England) Bob Andrews	19
13	(Australia) Jack Biggs	17
14	(United Kingdom) Tadeusz Teodorowicz	15
15	(England) Mike Broadbank	15
16	(England) Nigel Boocock	15

Pos.	Rider	Points
17	(England) Les McGillivray	14
18	(England) Split Waterman	13
19	(England) George White	13
20	(Wales) Ian Williams	12
21	(England) Jack Unstead	11
22	(England) Les Owen	10
23	(Australia) Ray Cresp	8
24	(England) Billy Bales	8
25	(England) Alf Hagon	7
26	(Australia) Jack Geran	7
27	(Australia) Neil Street	7
28	(England) Ronnie Genz	5
29	(England) Gerry Jackson	5
30	(England) Dick Fisher	4
31	(England) Ron Mountford	4
32	(Scotland) Gordon McGregor	3

=== European Final ===
- 14 August 1960
- (Poland) Olympic Stadium, Wrocław
- First 6 to World Final plus 1 reserve

Placing	Rider	Total	1	2	3	4	5	6	7	8	9	10	11	12	13	14	15	16	17	18	19	20	Pts	Pos	21
1	(Poland) (6) Marian Kaiser	14		3				3			3							3			2		14	1	
2	(Sweden) (14) Ove Fundin	13				2		2					3		3							3	13	2	
3	(Poland) (3) Stefan Kwoczała	11	3						3				1				3				1		11	3	
4	(West Germany) (2) Josef Hofmeister	10	0					1				3				3				3			10	4	
5	(Poland) (12) Henryk Żyto	10			2					2		2			1						3		10	5	
6	(Sweden) (1) Rune Sörmander	10	2				2				2				2				2				10	6	
7	(Poland) (10) Mieczysław Połukard	9			3			0						3			2		1				9	7	3
8	(Czechoslovakia) (8) Stanislav Svoboda	9		1						3			2			0			3				9	8	2
9	(Norway) (15) Aage Hansen	8				3			2			1						2	0				8	9	
10	(Sweden) (4) Olle Nygren	6	1							1				2				1				1	6	10	
11	(Sweden) (5) Curt Nyqvist	5		2			1					0					0					2	5	11	
12	(Poland) (16) Jan Malinowski	4				0				0	1						1			2			4	12	
13	(Czechoslovakia) (9) František Richter	4			1		3						0					0		0			4	13	
14	(Sweden) (13) Göte Nordin	4				1	0							1		2					0		4	14	
15	(Sweden) (7) Björn Knutson	2		0					1					0	0					1			2	15	
16	(Sweden) (11) Göran Norlén	1			0				0		0					1						0	1	16	
R1	(Sweden) (R1) Alf Jonsson	0																					0	R1	
Placing	Rider	Total	1	2	3	4	5	6	7	8	9	10	11	12	13	14	15	16	17	18	19	20	Pts	Pos	21

m - exclusion for exceeding two minute time allowance • t - exclusion for touching the tapes • x - other exclusion • e - retired or mechanical failure • f - fell • ns - non-starter • nc - non-classify

gate A - inside	gate B	gate C	gate D - outside

== World Final ==
- 17 September 1960
- (England) Wembley Stadium, London,

Placing	Rider	Total	1	2	3	4	5	6	7	8	9	10	11	12	13	14	15	16	17	18	19	20	Pts	Pos	21
1	(Sweden) (2) Ove Fundin	14	3					3				2				3				3			14	1	3
2	(New Zealand) (12) Ronnie Moore	14			3					3		3			2						3		14	2	2
3	(England) (7) Peter Craven	14		3					3					3	3					2			14	3	1
4	(Australia) (11) Peter Moore	12			2				2		3					2						3	12	4	
5	(New Zealand) (13) Ron Johnston	10				3	2							2		1					2		10	5	
6	(New Zealand) (5) Barry Briggs	9		2			1					1					3					2	9	6	
7	(Poland) (14) Stefan Kwoczała	8				1		2					3		1							1	8	7	
8	(West Germany) (6) Josef Hofmeister	6		0				0			2							3			1		6	8	
9	(Scotland) (9) Ken McKinlay	6			0		3						2					1		0			6	9	
10	(Australia) (4) Jack Young	6	1							2				1				2				F	6	10	
11	(Australia) (1) Chum Taylor	5	2				0				0				0				3				5	11	
12	(Sweden) (16) Rune Sörmander	5				2				0	1						1			1			5	12	
13	(Poland) (10) Henryk Żyto	4			1			1						0			2		0				4	13	
14	(Australia) (8) Aub Lawson	4		1						1			1			0			1				4	14	
15	(Poland) (3) Marian Kaiser	1	0						1				0				0				0		1	15	
16	(England) (15) Bryan Elliott	0				0			E			E						0	-				0	16	
R1	(England) (R1) Bob Andrews	2																	2				2	R1	
R2	(Poland) (R2) Mieczysław Połukard	0																					0	R2	
Placing	Rider	Total	1	2	3	4	5	6	7	8	9	10	11	12	13	14	15	16	17	18	19	20	Pts	Pos	21

m - exclusion for exceeding two minute time allowance • t - exclusion for touching the tapes • x - other exclusion • e - retired or mechanical failure • f - fell • ns - non-starter • nc - non-classify

gate A - inside	gate B	gate C	gate D - outside

== See also ==
- motorcycle speedway
- 1960 Speedway World Team Cup
