= 1961 Speedway World Team Cup =

2nd edition of the annual motorcycle speedway World Cup competition

Seasons
- ← 1960 1962 →

1961 Speedway World Team Cup was the second edition of the FIM Speedway World Team Cup to determine the team world champions.

The final took place in Wrocław, Poland. The World Champion title was won by Poland team (32 pts) who beat Sweden (31 pts), England (21 pts), and Czechoslovakia (12 pts).

== Format ==
Semifinals
8 June - Odense (details)
Sweden	38
Denmark	26
Norway	18
Finland	14
28 June - 14 August (details)
England	219
New Zealand	186
Australia	30
–	–
4 August - Plzeň (details)
Czechoslovakia	45
West Germany	22
Czechoslovakia B	18
Austria	11
30 July - Rybnik (details)
Poland	48
Soviet Union	30
Bulgaria	14
East Germany	4

Final
3 September - Wrocław (details)
Poland	32
Sweden	31
England	21
Czechoslovakia	12

== Qualification ==
=== Nordic Round ===
- 8 June
- (Denmark) Odense Athletics Stadium, Odense

1st	2nd	3rd	4th
Sweden 38; Björn Knutson 12; Per Tage Svensson 10; Sören Sjösten 9 Tore Kindstrand 7	Denmark 26; Kurt W. Petersen 9 Hans P Boisen 7 Arne Pander 5 Svend Nissen 5	Norway 18; Reidar Kristoffersen 6 Rolf Mellerud 5 Rolf Westerberg 4 Sverre Harrfeldt 3	Finland 14; Timo Laine 10; Esko Koponen 2 Illka Helminen 2 Kalevi Lahtinen 0

=== British Round ===
- R1: 28 June - (England) Brandon Stadium, Coventry

1st	2nd	3rd
England - 41; Peter Craven - 17; Ron How - 11; Bob Andrews - 9 Ken McKinlay - 2 Les Owen - 2	New Zealand - 36; Barry Briggs - 17; Ronnie Moore - 15; Bob Duckworth - 2 Bryce Subritzky - 2 Dick Campbell - 0	Australia - 31; Jack Young - 13; Johnny Chamberlain - 11; Peter Moore - 4 Jack Geran - 3 Ray Cresp - 0

- R2: 26 July - (England) New Cross Stadium, London

1st	2nd	3rd
England - 44; Peter Craven - 13; Split Waterman - 13; Ron How - 12; Bob Andrews - 6	New Zealand - 38; Ronnie Moore - 18; Barry Briggs - 14; Bob Duckworth - 3 Bryce Subritzky - 3 Trevor Redmond - 0	Australia - 26; Jack Young - 12; Chum Taylor - 9 Peter Moore - 3 Johnny Chamberlain - 2 Bluey Scott - 0

- R3: 28 July - (England) Leicester Stadium, Leicester

1st	2nd	3rd
England - 50; Peter Craven - 16; Bob Andrews - 13; Ron How - 12; Ken McKinlay - 7 Les Owen - 2	New Zealand - 36; Barry Briggs - 16; Bob Duckworth - 9 Ron Johnston - 6 Ronnie Moore - 5 Bryce Subritzky - 0	Australia - 22; Chum Taylor - 9 Johnny Chamberlain - 6 Jack Geran - 6 Bluey Scott - 1 Jack Young - 0

- R4: 10 August - (England) Foxhall Stadium, Ipswich

1st	2nd	3rd
England - 44; Peter Craven - 18; Ron How - 15; Bob Andrews - 5 Ken McKinlay - 4 Les McGillivray - 2	New Zealand - 38; Barry Briggs - 16; Ronnie Moore - 16; Ron Johnston - 6 Bryce Subritzky - 0 Trevor Redmond - 0	Australia - 26; Chum Taylor - 10; Peter Moore - 7 Ray Cresp - 5 Johnny Chamberlain - 4 Bluey Scott - 0

- R5: 14 August - (England) Wimbledon Stadium, London

1st	2nd	3rd
England - 40; Peter Craven - 13; Ron How - 11; Ken McKinlay - 9 Cyril Maidment - 5 Bob Andrews - 2	New Zealand - 38; Ronnie Moore - 18; Barry Briggs - 15; Ron Johnston - 3 Bryce Subritzky - 1 Trevor Redmond - 1	Australia - 30; Chum Taylor - 14; Jack Young - 9 Peter Moore - 6 Johnny Chamberlain - 1

Team	Points	R1	R2	R3	R4	R5
England	219	41	44	50	44	40
New Zealand	186	36	38	36	38	38
Australia	135	31	26	22	26	30

=== Central European Round ===
- 4 August
- (Czechoslovakia) Plzeň speedway track, Plzeň

1st	2nd	3rd	4th
Czechoslovakia 45; Antonín Kasper Sr. 12; Luboš Tomíček 12; Libor Dousanek 11; Stanislav Svoboda 10	West Germany 22; Josef Hofmeister 10; Manfred Poschenreider 5 Josef Seidl 4 Alfred Aberl 3	Czechoslovakia B 18; Frantisek Eib 6 Miroslav Šmíd 5 Karel Polak 4 Miloslav Hradecky 2	Austria 11; Josef Bössner 3 Johan Hart 3 Erhard Koffler 2 Helmut Happer 0

=== East European Round ===
- July 30
- (Poland) Rybnik Municipal Stadium, Rybnik

Pos.	National team	Pts.	Riders
1st	Poland	48	1.Florian Kapała - 12 (3,3,3,3); 2.Henryk Żyto - 12 (3,3,3,3); 3.Stanisław Tkocz - 12 (3,3,3,3); 4.Konstanty Pociejkewicz - 12 (3,3,3,3); 17.Antoni Woryna - NS
2nd	Soviet Union	30	5.Igor Plechanov - 8 (2,2,2,2); 6.Boris Samorodov - 8 (2,2,2,2); 7.Farid Szajnurov - 8 (2,2,2,2); 8.Viktor Kuznetsov - 6 (2,2,NS,2); 18.Vsevolod Nerytov - NS
3rd	Bulgaria	14	13.Milko Pejkov - 4 (1,1,1,1); 14.Boris Damjanov - 3 (1,0,2,NS); 15.Dimitri Bajev - 3 (1,1,1,NS); 16.Plamen Aleksandrov - 4 (1,1,1,1); 20.Gavril Macev - NS
4	East Germany	4	9.Andreas Bocke - 0 (0,0,0,0); 10.Helmut Suchland - 1 (0,0,0,1); 11.Gunther Schelenz - 1 (0,1,0,0); 12.Wilhelm Gunther - 2 (0,0,1,1); 19.Andreas Mattscheck - NS

== World Final ==
- 3 September
- (Poland) Olympic Stadium, Wrocław

Pos.	National team	Pts.	Riders
1st	Poland	32	1.Mieczyslaw Polukard - 5 (2,1,2,-); 2.Marian Kaiser - 10 (3,3,1,3); 3.Henryk Żyto - 7 (1,0,3,3); 4.Florian Kapała - 6 (3,3,E,-); R.Stanisław Tkocz - 4 (-,-,2,2)
2nd	Sweden	31	1.Bjorn Knutson - 7 (0,2,2,3); 2.Sören Sjösten - 2 (0,-,-,2); 3.Ove Fundin - 11 (2,3,3,3); 4.Per Tage Svensson - 7 (3,2,0,2); R.Rune Sörmander - 4 (-,2,2,-)
3rd	England	21	1.Ron How - 3 (1,1,1,F); 2.Bob Andrews - 6 (1,1,3,1); 3.Peter Craven - 8 (2,3,2,1); 4.Ken McKinlay - 4 (2,1,E,1); R.Cyril Maidment - NS
4	Czechoslovakia	12	1.Luboš Tomíček - 7 (1,2,3,1); 2.Antonín Kasper Sr. - 4 (3,0,1,0); 3.Stanislav Svoboda - 0 (F,0,0,0); 4.Bohumír Bartoněk - 1 (0,0,1,0); R.Libor Dušanek - NS

== See also ==
- Motorcycle speedway
- 1961 Individual Speedway World Championship
