= 1956 Speedway National League Division Two =

British motorcycle speedway season

- League: National League Division Two
- No. of competitors: 7
- Champions: Swindon Robins
- National Trophy (Div 2 final): Southampton Saints
- Highest average: Per Olof Söderman
- Division/s above: National League (Div 1)
- Division/s below: Southern League

1956 was the final season of the Speedway National League Division Two.

== Summary ==
With the number of sides competing at national level diminishing from 37 at the start of 1951 to just 14 in 1956, only a single national division would be in existence by 1957. Poole Pirates had been promoted to Division One and Exeter Falcons had closed leaving seven entrants.

Swindon Robins captured the title by a single point.

Southampton's 34-year-old captain Ernie Rawlins died in Southampton Hospital on 22 September 1956, following an accident in the match against Birmingham on 18 September.

== Final table ==
Pos	Team	M	W	D	L	Pts
1	Swindon Robins	24	16	0	8	32
2	Southampton Saints	24	15	1	8	31
3	Rayleigh Rockets	24	14	1	9	29
4	Ipswich Witches	24	13	0	11	26
5	Coventry Bees	24	12	0	12	24
6	Leicester Hunters	24	6	1	17	13
7	Oxford Cheetahs	24	6	1	17	13

== Fixtures & results ==
=== A Fixtures ===
Home \ Away	COV	IPS	LEI	OX	RAY	SOT	SWI
Coventry		51–44	53–43	71–25	54–42	63–33	43–53
Ipswich	51–45		56–40	65–30	49–46	57–39	47–49
Leicester	45–51	55–41		58–38	40–56	47–49	45–51
Oxford	54–42	55–41	47–49		48–48	38–58	47–49
Rayleigh	64–32	55–41	69–27	63–33		67–29	64–32
Southampton	60–36	54–42	48–48	63–33	60–36		59–37
Swindon	53–41	56–40	50–46	55–41	52–44	57–39	

Legend: Blue = home team win; Yellow = draw; Red = away team win.

=== B Fixtures ===
Home \ Away	COV	IPS	LEI	OX	RAY	SOT	SWI
Coventry		46–50	49–47	56–40	56–40	51–42	51–45
Ipswich	54–42		57–39	63–32	51–45	53–43	47–49
Leicester	43–52	47–49		66–30	62–34	41–55	53–43
Oxford	59–37	45–51	50–46		48–47	45–51	51–45
Rayleigh	54–42	68–28	55–41	58–38		62–34	49–47
Southampton	50–46	53–43	70–26	66–30	63–33		57–39
Swindon	55–40	65–31	61–34	56–39	46–49	51–45	

Legend: Blue = home team win; Yellow = draw; Red = away team win.

== Top Five Riders (League only) ==
	Rider	Nat	Team	C.M.A.
1	Per Olof Söderman	(Sweden)	Coventry	11.74
2	Ken McKinlay	(Scotland)	Leicester	10.25
3	Dick Bradley	(England)	Southampton	10.22
4	Bob Roger	(England)	Swindon	9.53
5	Ian Williams	(Wales)	Swindon	9.52

== National Trophy Stage One ==
- For Stage Two - see Stage Two

The 1956 National Trophy was the 19th edition of the Knockout Cup. The Trophy consisted of two stages; stage one was for the second-tier clubs, stage two was for the top-tier clubs. Southampton won stage one and qualified for second and final stage.

Division Two First round

Date	Team one	Score	Team two
21/04	Coventry	55-53	Ipswich
21/04	Rayleigh	74-34	Oxford
21/04	Swindon	65-43	Leicester
20/04	Leicester	65-43	Swindon
19/04	Ipswich	68-40	Coventry
19/04	Oxford	40-68	Rayleigh
05/05 replay	Swindon	51-56	Leicester
04/05 replay	Leicester	76-32	Swindon

Division Two semifinals

Date	Team one	Score	Team two
26/05	Rayleigh	68-39	Southampton
25/05	Leicester	67-40	Ipswich
22/05	Southampton	69-39	Rayleigh
21/05	Ipswich	46-62	Leicester

=== Division Two final ===
First leg

19 June 1956

Southampton Saints Dick Bradley 15 Brian Hanham 13 Ernie Rawlins 12 Johnny Hole 7 Frank Bettis 6 Alby Golden 5 Maurie Mattingley 4 Ron Sharp 2	64 – 43	Leicester Lions Ken McKinlay 14 Ron Phillips 11 Charlie Barsby 5 Len Williams 5 Bryan Elliott 3 Barrie East 3 Gordon McGregor 2 Ivor Brown 0

Banister Court Stadium

Second leg

22 June 1956

Leicester Lions Len Williams 12 Ken McKinlay 9 Ron Phillips 8 Gordon McGregor 7 Charlie Barsby 6 Barrie East 4 Ivor Brown 4 Dennis Parker 4	54 – 54	Southampton Saints Ernie Rawlins 14 Dick Bradley 13 Brian Hanham 9 Maurie Mattingley 7 Alby Golden 5 Johnny Hole 2 Frank Bettis 2 Ron Sharp 2

Leicester Stadium

== Riders & final averages ==
Coventry

- (Sweden) Per Olof Söderman 11.74
- (Scotland) Bob Mark 7.50
- (New Zealand) Charlie New 8.04
- (England) Reg Duval 6.53
- (England) Nick Nicholls 6.40
- (England) Jim Lightfoot 5.98
- (England) Eric Hockaday 5.05
- (England) Les Tolley 4.41

Ipswich

- (England) Bert Edwards 9.21
- (Australia) Bob Sharp 8.93
- (Australia) Junior Bainbridge 8.70
- (England) Tich Read (George Snailum) 6.40
- (England) Ken Adams 5.31
- (England) Danny Dunton 4.56
- (Scotland) Larry Lazarus 3.54
- (Australia) Bill Bryden 3.05
- (England) Ken Last 2.76
- (England) Len Silver 2.33

Leicester

- (Scotland) Ken McKinlay 10.25
- (Scotland) Gordon McGregor 8.21
- (England) Derick Close 6.
- (England) Johnny Green 5.
- (England) Charlie Barsby 5.92
- (England) Len Williams 5.89
- (Australia) Ron Phillips 5.61
- (England) Les McGillivray 4.73
- (England) Barry East 3.61
- (England) Bryan Elliott 2.42
- (England) Vic Hall 2.09
- (England) Dennis Parker 1.33
- (England) Ivor Brown 1.33

Oxford

- (England) Ronnie Genz 8.53
- (England) Peter Robinson 6.20
- (England) Bob Baker 5.90
- (England) Dennis Newton 5.60
- (England) Howdy Byford 5.55
- (England) Pat Clark 5.07
- (England) Terry Courtnell 4.70
- (Scotland) Tommy Miller 4.29
- (New Zealand) Bill Thatcher 4.00
- (England) Roy Bowers 4.00
- (England) Jim Tebby 3.69
- (England) Maury Courtnell 2.46

Rayleigh

- (England) Jack Unstead 9.50
- (England) Gerry Jackson 8.25
- (England) Les McGillivray 7.78
- (England) Pete Lansdale 7.17
- (England) Alan Smith 6.99
- (England) Maury McDermott 6.40
- (Guernsey) Johnny Fitzpatrick 5.38
- (England) Eric Ebbs 5.33

Southampton

- (England) Dick Bradley 10.22
- (England) Bill Holden 8.48
- (England) Ernie Rawlins 8.41
- (England) Brian Hanham 8.36
- (England) Ron Sharp 5.75
- (England) Alby Golden 5.43
- (England) Maury Mattingley 5.25
- (England) Johnny Hole 5.17
- (England) Charlie May 4.59
- (England) Frank Bettis 3.20

Swindon

- (England) Bob Roger 9.53
- (Wales) Ian Williams 9.52
- (England) George White 9.15
- (England) Ernie Lessiter 5.69
- (England) Ray Harris 4.76
- (England) Ron Swaine 4.13
- (England) Danny Malone 3.83
- (England) Al Sparrey 3.58
- (England) Glyn Chandler 3.08

== See also ==
- List of United Kingdom Speedway League Champions
- Knockout Cup (speedway)
