= 1958 Individual Speedway World Championship =

13th edition of the World motorcycle speedway championship

Seasons
- ← 1957 1959 →

The 1958 Individual Speedway World Championship was the 13th edition of the official World Championship to determine the world champion rider.

In the World final New Zealander Barry Briggs successfully defended his title and was unbeaten after five heat wins. Ove Fundin took the silver medal but there was an incident filled ride off for the bronze medal. Aub Lawson won that ride off after both Peter Craven and Ken McKinlay fell, Craven remounted to take fourth place.

== Qualifying ==
Qualification started in 1957.

=== Stage 1 ===
==== Norwegian round ====
- 20 October 1957
- (Norway) Tønsberg Stadion, Tønsberg
- Top 4 (+4 seeded) to Nordic qualification 1958

Pos.	Rider	Points
1	Aage Hansen	15
2	Reidar Kristoffersen	12
3	Roger Steen	11
4	Roger Hansen	10
5	Egil Bratvold	10
6	Arne Kristiansen	10
7	Rolf Westerberg	7
8	Gunnar Hemsaeter	7
9	Erling Simonsen	7
10	Oddvar Wold	7
11	Thorbjorn Nygaard	5
12	Fred Carlsen	4
13	Jan Svaleng	4
14	Roald Kjolso	2
15	Havard Gulbjornrud	2
16	Kjell Berg	1
17	Oystein Mellerud	1

==== Finnish round ====
- 27 October 1957
- (Finland) Helsinki Velodrome, Helsinki
- Top 4 (+2 seeded) to Nordic qualification 1958

Pos.	Rider	Points
1	Antti Pajari	14+3
2	Aulis Tuominen	14+2
3	Turkka Silvan	12
4	Lasse Mylläri	9
5	Heikki Sorri	9
6	Valle Selivestov	8
7	Kauko Jousanen	7
8	Antero Salasto	7
9	Petti Mikkola	7
10	Kalevi Lahtinen	7
11	Pekka Tenko	6
12	Timo Laine	6
13	Reino Niemi	5
14	Olle Helander	2
15	Esko Koponen	2
16	Timo Pirkkalanniemi	0

==== Swedish round ====
- 1 May 1958
- (Sweden) Gamla Speedway Track, Visby
- Top 7 to Nordic qualification

Pos.	Rider	Points
1	Rune Sörmander	15
2	Per-Olof Söderman	13
3	Evert Andersson	12
4	Joel Jansson	12
5	Bernt Nilsson	11
6	Kjell Wårenius	10
7	Lars Pettersson	10
8	Björn Knutson	7
9	Göte Nordin	6
10	Olle Andersson IV	5
11	Hans Hallberg	5
12	Åke Andersson	4
13	Olle Andersson II	3
14	Per Sjöholm	3
15	Thorsten Carlsson	3
16	Curt Eldh	1
17	Sven-Gunnar Karlstén	0

- 1 May 1958
- (Sweden) Hammarby IP, Stockholm
- Top 7 to Nordic qualification

Pos.	Rider	Points
1	Birger Forsberg	13
2	Olle Nygren	12
3	Ove Fundin	12
4	Dan Forsberg	12
5	Bengt Eriksson	10
6	Curt Nyqvist	8
7	Olle Segerström	8
8	Göran Norlén	7+3
9	Bert Lindarw	7+2
10	Rune Claesson	7
11	Arne Carlsson	6
12	Alf Jonsson	6
13	Sune Karlsson	3
14	Bengt Brannefors	3
15	Roland Krantz	2
16	Georg Duneborn	1
17	Thorvald Karlsson	0
18	Per-Tage Svensson	0

=== Stage 2 ===
==== Nordic qualification ====
- 25 May 1958
- (Sweden) Grevby Motorstadion, Mariestad
- Top 8 to Nordic final

Pos.	Rider	Points
1	Ove Fundin	15
2	Olle Nygren	14
3	Birger Forsberg	12
4	Dan Forsberg	11
5	Bengt Eriksson	10
6	Göran Norlén	9
7	Timo Laine	8+3
8	Curt Nyqvist	8+2
9	Björn Knutson	8+1
10	Sverre Harrfeldt	6
11	Antti Pajari	5
12	Kalevi Lahtinen	5
13	Lasse Mylläri	4
14	Timo Pirkalanniemi	3
15	Roger Hansen	1
16	Turkka Silvan	1

- 5 June 1958
- (Norway) Dælenenga idrettspark, Oslo
- Top 8 to Nordic final

Pos.	Rider	Points
1	Per-Olof Söderman	15
2	Rune Sörmander	13
3	Nils Paulsen	12
4	Aage Hansen	11
5	Kjell Wårenius	11
6	Arne Pander	9
7	Bernt Nilsson	8
8	Reidar Kristoffersen	8
9	Evert Andersson	7
10	Rolf Westerberg	6
11	Arne Kristiansen	5
12	Lars Pettersson	4
13	Roger Steen	4
14	Kurt W Petersen	4
15	Svend Nissen	2
16	Poul Hansen	1

==== Continental semi-final ====
- 18 May 1958
- (West Germany) Abensberger Stadion, Abensberg
- Top 8 to Continental final

Pos.	Rider	Points
1	Josef Seidl	13
2	Josef Hofmeister	12
3	Joel Jansson	11
4	Edward Kupczynski	11
5	Stanislaw Tkocz	11
6	Janusz Koscielak	10
7	Joachim Maj	10
8	Konstanty Pociejkowicz	9
9	Olle Segerström	
10	Florian Kapała	
11	Tadeusz Teodorowicz	
12	Paweł Waloszek	
13	Albin Aberl	
14	Nick van Gorcum	
15	Albin Siegl	
16	Thei Bischops	

- 18 May 1958
- (Austria) Wiener Stadion, Vienna
- Top 8 to Continental final

Pos.	Rider	Points
1	Marian Kaiser	13
2	Janusz Suchecki	13
3	Henryk Zyto	12
4	Stefan Kwoczala	12
5	Luboš Tomíček Sr.	10
6	Jaroslav Volf	9
7	Karl Killmeyer	8
8	Josef Bössner	7
9	Valentin Unterköfler	7
10	Ligor Dusanek	7
11	Vladimir Uher	6
12	Otto Holoubek	4
13	Hans Sidlo	4
14	Alois Dürrenhammer	4
15	Erich Sidlo	2
16	Ernst Strasser	1

=== Stage 3 ===
==== Nordic Final ====
- 8 June 1958
- (Sweden) Växjö Motorstadion, Växjö
- First 8 to European final

Pos.	Rider	Points
1	(Sweden) Rune Sörmander	15
2	(Sweden) Ove Fundin	12
3	(Sweden) Olle Nygren	12
4	(Sweden) Dan Forsberg	11
5	(Sweden) Göran Norlén	9
6	(Sweden) Per Olof Söderman	9
7	(Norway) Nils Paulsen	8
8	(Sweden) Birger Forsberg	7
9	(Norway) Aage Hansen	7
10	(Sweden) Bengt Eriksson	6
11	(Denmark) Arne Pander	5
12	(Finland) Timo Laine	4
13	(Sweden) Bernt Nilsson	4
14	(Sweden) Curt Nyqvist	3
15	(Sweden) Evert Andersson	2
16	(Sweden) Kjell Wårenius	2
17	(Sweden) Björn Knutson	2
18	(Norway) Reidar Kristoffersen	dnr

==== Continental Final ====
- 1 June 1958
- (West Germany) Niederrheinstadion, Oberhausen
- First 8 to European Final

Pos.	Rider	Points
1	(Sweden) Joel Jansson	14
2	(West Germany) Josef Hofmeister	14
3	(West Germany) Josef Seidl	11
4	(Czechoslovakia) Luboš Tomíček Sr.	9
5	(Poland) Stanisław Tkocz	9
6	(Poland) Marian Kaiser	9
7	(Poland) Joachim Maj	8
8	(Poland) Edward Kupczyński	8
9	(Poland) Konstanty Pociejkewicz	8
10	(Poland) Janusz Suchecki	7
11	(Poland) Henryk Żyto	6
12	(Austria) Alfred Aberl	6
13	(Poland) Janusz Koscielak	3
14	(Czechoslovakia) Jaroslav Volf	3
15	(Austria) Josef Bössner	3
16	(Austria) Karl Killmeyer	1
176	(Austria) Valentin Unterköfler (res)	0

==== British & Commonwealth qualifying ====
- Top 32 from 80 qualify for British & Commonwealth semi-finals.

Date	Venue	Winner
14 July	Wimborne Road	Jack Biggs
14 July	Wimbledon Stadium	Ronnie Moore
15 July	Banister Court Stadium	Ronnie Genz
17 July	Foxhall Stadium	Peter Moore
17 July	Oxford Stadium	Gordon McGregor
18 July	Leicester Stadium	Ken McKinlay
19 July	Hyde Road	Ron Johnston
19 July	Brandon Stadium	Jack Young
19 July	The Firs Stadium	Billy Bales
19 July	Abbey Stadium	Ron How

=== Stage 4 ===
==== British/Commonwealth semi-final ====
- Barry Briggs seeded to World final
- First 10 to World final + 1 reserve

Date	Venue	Winner
16 August	Hyde Road	Ken McKinklay
18 August	Wimbledon Stadium	Peter Craven
19 August	Banister Court Stadium	Jack Geran
22 August	Leicester Stadium	Brian Crutcher

Pos.	Rider	Points
1	(Scotland) Ken McKinlay	27
2	(England) Peter Craven	27
3	(England) Mike Broadbanks	25
4	(England) Ron How	24
5	(Australia) Peter Moore	24
6	(New Zealand) Ronnie Moore	23
7	(Australia) Aub Lawson	22
8	(New Zealand) Ron Johnston	22
9	(England) Gerry Hussey	22
10	(Australia) Jack Geran	22
11	(England) Brian Crutcher	22
12	(Scotland) Gordon McGregor	20
13	(England) George White	17
14	(England) Dick Bradley	15
15	(England) Billy Bales	14
16	(Australia) Neil Street	14

Pos.	Rider	Total pts
17	(Australia) Chum Taylor	13
18	(Australia) Jack Young	13
19	(England) Alf Hagon	13
20	(England) Jack Unstead	12
21	(Australia) Jack Biggs	11
22	(New Zealand) Bob Duckworth	8
23	(England) Harry Edwards	8
24	(England) Ronnie Genz	7
25	(England) Gerald Jackson	6
26	(New Zealand) Charlie New	6
27	(England) Arthur Forrest	5
28	(England) Eric Boothroyd	4
29	(Australia) Ray Cresp	3
30	(England) Phil Clarke	3
31	(England) Ron Mountford	1

==== European Final ====
- 22 July 1958
- (Poland) Army Stadium, Warsaw
- First 5 to World final plus 1 reserve

Pos.	Rider	Total
1	(Sweden) Ove Fundin	15
2	(West Germany) Josef Hofmeister	13
3	(Sweden) Rune Sörmander	12
4	(Sweden) Olle Nygren	11
5	(Sweden) Joel Jansson	10
6	(Sweden) Per Olof Söderman	9
7	(Poland) Marian Kaiser	9
8	(West Germany) Josef Seidl	7
9	(Poland) Joachim Maj	6
10	(Norway) Nils Paulsen	6
11	(Czechoslovakia) Luboš Tomíček Sr.	5
12	(Poland) Stanisław Tkocz	4
13	(Poland) Edward Kupczyński	4
14	(Sweden) Dan Forsberg	3
15	(Sweden) Göran Norlén	2
16	(Sweden) Birger Forsberg	2

== World final ==
- 20 September 1958
- (England) London, Wembley Stadium
- Referee: ( (England) ) E. G. Cope

Pos.	Rider	Heat Scores	Total
1	(New Zealand) Barry Briggs	(3,3,3,3,3)	15
2	(Sweden) Ove Fundin	(3,3,2,3,2)	13
3	(Australia) Aub Lawson	(1,3,3,1,3)	11+3
4	(England) Peter Craven	(2,3,0,3,3)	11+2
5	(Scotland) Ken McKinlay	(2,2,3,2,2)	11+1
6	(New Zealand) Ronnie Moore	(3,2,0,1,3)	9
7	(Sweden) Olle Nygren	(3,2,2,2,0)	9
8	(New Zealand) Ron Johnston	(1,1,1,3,2)	8
9	(England) Gerry Hussey	(2,0,2,2,1)	7
10	(England) Ron How	(1,1,2,2,1)	7
11	(Australia) Peter Moore	(0,1,3,1,0)	5
12	(England) Mike Broadbank	(2,0,1,0,2)	5
13	(Sweden) Rune Sörmander	(0,2,1,0,1)	4
14	(Australia) Jack Geran	(0,1,1,0,1)	3
15	(Germany) Josef Hofmeister	(1,0,0,1,0)	2
16	(Sweden) Joel Jansson	(0,0,0,0,0)	0
R1	(England) Brian Crutcher	did not ride	-
R2	(Sweden) Per Olof Söderman	did not ride	-

=== Classification ===
Placing	Rider	Total	1	2	3	4	5	6	7	8	9	10	11	12	13	14	15	16	17	18	19	20	Pts	Pos
1	(New Zealand) (4) Barry Briggs	15	3							3				3				3				3	15	1
2	(Sweden) (13) Ove Fundin	13				3	3							2		3					2		13	2
3	(Australia) (2) Aub Lawson	11+3	1					3				3				1				3			11	3
4	(England) (3) Peter Craven	11+2	2						3				e				3				3		11	4
5	(Scotland) (11) Ken McKinlay	11+0			2				2		3					2						2	11	5
6	(New Zealand) (10) Ronnie Moore	9			3			2						0			1		3				9	6
7	(Sweden) (5) Olle Nygren	9		3			2					2					2					e	9	7
8	(New Zealand) (7) Ron Johnston	8		1					1					1	3					2			8	8
9	(England) (6) Gerry Hussey	7		2				0			2							2			1		7	9
10	(England) (14) Ron How	7				1		1					2		2							1	7	10
11	(Australia) (9) Peter Moore	5			f		1						3					1		0			5	11
12	(England) (15) Mike Broadbank	5				2			0			1						0	2				5	12
13	(Sweden) (16) Rune Sörmander	4				0				2	1						0			1			4	13
14	(Australia) (8) Jack Geran	3		f						1			1			0			1				3	14
15	(Germany) (12) Josef Hofmeister	2			1					0		0			1						0		2	15
16	(Sweden) (1) Joel Jansson	0	0				0				0				0				0				0	16
	(England) (17) Brian Crutcher	0																					0	
	(Sweden) (18) Per Olof Söderman	0																					0	
Placing	Rider	Total	1	2	3	4	5	6	7	8	9	10	11	12	13	14	15	16	17	18	19	20	Pts	Pos

m - exclusion for exceeding two minute time allowance • t - exclusion for touching the tapes • x - other exclusion • e - retired or mechanical failure • f - fell • ns - non-starter • nc - non-classify

gate A - inside	gate B	gate C	gate D - outside
