= 1957 Individual Speedway World Championship =

12th edition of the World motorcycle speedway championship

Seasons
- ← 1956 1958 →

The 1957 Individual Speedway World Championship was the 12th edition of the official World Championship to determine the world champion rider.

The event was sponsored by the Sunday Dispatch and the attendance was 51,000. New Zealander Barry Briggs won the title after a ride off against defending champion Ove Fundin after the pair tied on 14 points after five rides each. In the ride off Fundin took the lead before Briggs forced his way to the front and with a lap to go Fundin lost control and crashed into the safety fence. Briggs duly won the £500 first prize with Fundin bruised but collecting £200. Peter Craven won the bronze and £100 after another ride off for third place.

== Qualifying ==
Qualification started in 1956 and featured an extra round.

=== Stage 1 ===
==== Norwegian qualification ====
- 21 October 1956
- (Norway) Geiteryggen Speedwaybane, Skien
- Top 8 to Nordic qualification 1957

Pos.	Rider	Points
1	Aage Hansen	15
2	Rolf Westerberg	14
3	Reidar Kristoffersen	13
4	Nils Paulsen	12
5	Erling Simonsen	11
6	Odd Johansen	10
7	Arne Kristiansen	9
8	Roger Steen	9
9	Gunnar Dyrseth	7
10	Oddbjorn Blaasmo	5
11	Thorbjorn Nygaard	4

==== Finnish qualification ====
- 7 October 1956
- (Finland) Turku Hippodrome, Turku
- Top 8 to Nordic qualification 1957

Pos.	Rider	Points
1	Antti Pajari	15
2	Simo Ylanen	14
3	Kauko Jousanen	12
4	Reino Niemi	10
5	Pekka Tenko	9
6	Raimo Kivinen	8
7	Erkki Ala Sippola	8
8	Timo Laine	8
9	Paavo Mikkola	7
10	Kalevi Lahtinen	7
11	Rauno Aaltonen	6
12	Heikki Sorii	4
13	Aulis Tuominen	3
14	Valle Seliverstov	3
15	Jorma Rihkajarvi	2
16	Nils Staaf	2
17	Orvo Ahlqvist	1

==== Swedish qualification ====
- 10 May 1957
- (Sweden) Hammarby IP, Stockholm
- Top 6 to Nordic qualification

Pos.	Rider	Points
1	Per-Olof Söderman	14
2	Olle Nygren	14
3	Olle Segerström	11
4	Göte Nordin	10
5	Sven Fahlén	10
6	Lars Pettersson	10
7	Sune Karlsson	9
8	Kjell Wårenius	7
9	Bernt Nilsson	7
10	Roger Forsberg	7
11	Evert Andersson	5
12	Alf Jonsson	5
13	Thorsten Carlsson	5
14	Roland Krantz	4
15	Bo Sandin	2
16	Nils Johansson	0
17	Per-Åke Lundgren	0

- 12 May 1957
- (Sweden) Vetlanda Motorstadion, Vetlanda
- Top 6 to Nordic qualification

Pos.	Rider	Points
1	Rune Sörmander	15
2	Dan Forsberg	11
3	Bengt Eriksson	11
4	Bertil Carlsson II	10
5	Olle Andersson IV	9
6	Per-Tage Svensson	8+3
7	Bert Lindarw	8+2
8	Stig Pramberg	8+1
9	Allan Nilsson	8+0
10	Thorvald Karlsson	7
11	Rune Claesson	6
12	Kaj Forsberg	6
13	Björn Knutson	5
14	Gunnar Johansson	3
15	Göran Norlén	2
16	Bengt Brannefors	2

=== Stage 2 ===
==== Nordic qualification ====
- 24 May 1957
- (Norway) Dælenenga idrettspark, Oslo
- Top 8 to Nordic final

Pos.	Rider	Points
1	Olle Nygren	15
2	Reidar Kristoffersen	11
3	Sune Karlsson	11
4	Bertil Carlsson II	10
5	Olle Segerström	10
6	Rolf Westerberg	10
7	Aage Hansen	9
8	Bengt Eriksson	9
9	Olle Andersson IV	8
10	Arne Pander	8
11	Erik Kastebo	5
12	Erling Simonsen	4
13	Arne Kristiansen	4
14	Erik Wincentz	3
15	Fred Carlsen	1
16	Svend Nissen	1

- 26 May 1957
- (Finland) Kärpänen speedway track, Lahti
- Top 8 to Nordic final

Pos.	Rider	Points
1	Per-Olof Söderman	13
2	Dan Forsberg	13
3	Lars Pettersson	12
4	Rune Sörmander	12
5	Bert Lindarw	11
6	Nils Paulsen	11
7	Aulis Tuominen	8
8	Kauko Jousanen	8
9	Roger Steen	6
10	Raimo Kivinen	6
11	Sven Fahlén	5
12	Erkki Ala-Sippola	5
13	Pertti Mikkola	5
14	Timo Laine	3
15	Esko Koponen	2
16	Kalevi Lahtinen	0

==== Continental round ====
- 26 May 1958
- (West Germany) Abensberger Stadion, Abensberg
- Top 8 to Continental final

Pos.	Rider	Points
1	Josef Hofmeister	15
2	Josef Seidl	14
3	Andrzej Krzesinski	13
4	Birger Forsberg	10
5	Josef Kamper	10
6	Josef Kysilka	10
7	Joel Jansson	8
8	Simo Ylänen	7
9	Tony Kroeze	6
10	Alfred Aberl	6
11	Jarosłav Wolf	6
12	Mieczysław Połukard	5
13	Antti Pajari	4
14	Leopold Killmeyer	3
15	Albin Siegl	2
16	Thei Bishops	1

- 26 May 1958
- (Poland) Army Stadium, Warsaw
- Top 7 to Continental final

Pos.	Rider	Points
1	Florian Kapała	14
2	Rudolf Havelka	13.5
3	Joachim Maj	12
4	Marian Kaiser	10.5
5	Marian Philipp	9
6	Janusz Suchecki	9
7	Stanislaw Tkocz	9
8	Milan Spinka	8
9	Tadeusz Teodorowicz	7
10	Richard Janicek	7
11	Edward Kupczyński	7
12	Valentin Unterköfler	5
13	Jaroslav Machac	4
14	Erich Sidlo	2
15	Hans Sidlo	2
16	Franz Schenk	0

=== Stage 3 ===
==== Nordic Final ====
- 7 June 1957
- (Norway) Dælenenga idrettspark, Oslo
- First 8 to European final

Pos.	Rider	Points
1	(Norway) Aage Hansen	14
2	(Sweden) Per Olof Söderman	13
3	(Sweden) Rune Sörmander	12
4	(Sweden) Dan Forsberg	11
5	(Norway) Nils Paulsen	11
6	(Sweden) Olle Nygren	10
7	(Norway) Reidar Kristoffersen	10
8	(Norway) Rolf Westerberg	7
9	(Sweden) Bert Lindarw	7
10	(Denmark) Arne Pander	7
11	(Sweden) Lars Pettersson	6
12	(Sweden) Bengt Eriksson	5
13	(Sweden) Ole Andersson	3
14	(Sweden) Sune Karlsson	2
15	(Finland) Kauko Jousanen	2
16	(Finland) Aulis Tuominen	0
17	(Sweden) Bertil Carlsson	dnr
18	(Sweden) Olle Segerström	dnr

==== Continental Final ====
- 23 June 1957
- (Austria) Stadion Wien, Vienna
- First 8 to European Final

Pos.	Rider	Points
1	(West Germany) Josef Hofmeister	15
2	(West Germany) Josef Seidl	12
3	(Poland) Stanisław Tkocz	11
4	(Sweden) Birger Forsberg	10
5	(Sweden) Joel Jansson	10
6	(Austria) Josef Kamper	10
7	(Poland) Florian Kapała	10
8	(Poland) Marian Kaiser	9
9	(Poland) Janusz Suchecki	8
10	(Czechoslovakia) Jaroslav Volf	7
11	(Poland) Joachim Maj	5
12	(Czechoslovakia) Josef Kysilka	5
13	(Poland) Tadeusz Teodorowicz	4
14	(Austria) Erich Sidlo	2
15	(Czechoslovakia) Rudolf Havelka	1
16	(Austria) Otto Holoubek	0
17	(Poland) Marian Philipp	0
18	(Poland) Andrzej Krzesiński	dnr
19	(Finland) Simo Ylänen	dnr

==== British & Commonwealth qualifying ====
- Top 32 qualify for British & Commonwealth semi-final.

Date	Venue	Winner
13 July	Brandon Stadium	Ron Johnston
13 July	The Firs Stadium	Brian Crutcher
13 July	Rayleigh Weir Stadium	Ken McKinlay
13 July	Abbey Stadium	Ian Williams
15 July	Wimbledon Stadium	Peter Craven
16 July	Banister Court Stadium	Brian Crutcher
18 July	Foxhall Stadium	Cyril Roger
18 July	Oxford Stadium	Jack Geran
19 July	Leicester Stadium	Ken McKinlay

=== Stage 4 ===
==== British/Commonwealth semi-final ====
- 24 August 1958
- (England) Hyde Road, Manchester
- First 5 to World final

Pos.	Rider	Total
1	(England) Peter Craven	13
2	(New Zealand) Ron Johnston	13
3	(Wales) Ian Williams	12
4	(Australia) Aub Lawson	12
5	(England) Ron How	11
6	(England) Brian Crutcher	10
7	(England) Ken Middleditch	10
8	(England) Billy Bales	9
9	(England) Les McGillivray	7
10	(England) Gerald Jackson	6
11	(England) Brian Hanham	5
12	(New Zealand) Charlie New	5
13	(England) Maurice McDermott	3
14	(England) Arthur Forrest	3
15	(England) Cyril Maidment	1
16	(England) Ronnie Genz	1
17	(England) Eric French	0

- 24 August 1958
- (England) Brandon Stadium, Coventry
- First 5 to World final plus 1 reserve

Pos.	Rider	Total
1	(England) Bob Roger	14
2	(Scotland) Ken McKinlay	14
3	(New Zealand) Barry Briggs	13
4	(England) George White	12
5	(Australia) Jack Geran	11
6	(Australia) Jack Biggs	10
7	(England) Alf Hagon	9
8	(Australia) Neil Street	7
9	(England) Ron Mountford	7
10	(England) Eric Boothroyd	6
11	(England) Dick Bradley	5
12	(England) Phil Clarke	5
13	(England) Jim Lightfoot	4
14	(Australia) Peter Moore	3
15	(England) Jack Unstead	2
16	(England) Mike Broadbank	0

==== European Final ====
- 7 July 1957
- (Sweden) Växjö Motorstadion, Växjö
- Ove Fundin seeded to World final
- First 5 to World final plus 1 reserve

Pos.	Rider	Total
1	(Sweden) Rune Sörmander	14
2	(Sweden) Per Olof Söderman	13
3	(West Germany) Josef Hofmeister	12
4	(Sweden) Olle Nygren	11
5	(Norway) Aage Hansen	11
6	(Sweden) Dan Forsberg	9
7	(Norway) Rolf Westerberg	9
8	(Poland) Stanisław Tkocz	7
9	(Austria) Josef Kamper	6
10	(Poland) Florian Kapała	6
11	(Austria) Josef Seidl	5
12	(Poland) Marian Kaiser	4
13	(Sweden) Joel Jansson	3
14	(Norway) Nils Paulsen	3
15	(Norway) Reidar Kristoffersen	2
16	(Sweden) Birger Forsberg	2
17	(Sweden) Bert Lindarw	2

- Note: Olle Nygren injured and replaced by Dan Forsberg in final

== World final ==
- 21 September 1957
- (England) Wembley Stadium, London

Pos.	Rider	Heat Scores	Total
1	(New Zealand) Barry Briggs	(3,2,3,3,3)	14+3
2	(Sweden) Ove Fundin	(3,3,2,3,3)	14+2
3	(England) Peter Craven	(2,1,3,2,3)	11+3
4	(Australia) Aub Lawson	(3,3,1,2,2)	11+2
5	(Sweden) Rune Sörmander	(1,3,3,1,3)	11+1
6	(New Zealand) Ron Johnston	(3,2,1,1,2)	9
7	(Scotland) Ken McKinlay	(0,0,3,3,2)	8
8	(England) Bob Roger	(2,1,2,2,1)	8
9	(Sweden) Per Olof Söderman	(1,2,0,3,1)	7
10	(Australia) Jack Geran	(1,3,1,1,1)	7
11	(England) Ron How	(1,2,2,0,2)	7
12	(Norway) Aage Hansen	(0,0,2,2,0)	4
13	(England) George White	(2,1,0,1,0)	4
14	(Wales) Ian Williams	(2,0,1,0,0)	3
15	(Sweden) Dan Forsberg	(0,1,0,0,1)	2
16	(West Germany) Josef Hofmeister	(0,0,0,0,0)	0
R1	(Australia) Jack Biggs	did not ride	-
R2	(Norway) Rolf Westerberg	did not ride	-

=== Classification ===
Placing	Rider	Total	1	2	3	4	5	6	7	8	9	10	11	12	13	14	15	16	17	18	19	20	Pts	Pos
1	(New Zealand) (10) Barry Briggs	14+3			3			2						3			3		3				14	1
2	(Sweden) (4) Ove Fundin	14+2	3							3				2				3				3	14	2
3	(England) (2) Peter Craven	11+3	2					1				3				2				3			11	3
4	(Australia) (5) Aub Lawson	11+2		3			3					1					2					2	11	4
5	(Sweden) (3) Rune Sörmander	11+1	1						3				3				1				3		11	5
6	(New Zealand) (13) Ron Johnston	9				3	2							1		1					2		9	6
7	(Scotland) (1) Ken McKinlay	8	0				0				3				3				2				8	7
8	(England) (15) Bob Roger	8				2			1			2						2	1				8	8
9	(Sweden) (11) Per Olof Söderman	7			1				2		0					3						1	7	9
10	(Australia) (6) Jack Geran	7		1				3			1							1			1		7	10
11	(England) (16) Ron How	7				1				2	2						0			2			7	11
12	(Norway) (14) Aage Hansen	4				0		0					2		2							0	4	12
13	(England) (12) George White	4			2					1		0			1						0		4	13
14	(Wales) (8) Ian Williams	3		2						0			1			0			0				3	14
15	(Sweden) (9) Dan Forsberg	2			0		1						0					0		1			2	15
16	(Germany) (7) Josef Hofmeister	0		0					0					0	0					0			0	16
	(Norway) (17) Rolf Westerberg	0																					0	
	(Australia) (18) Jack Biggs	0																					0	
Placing	Rider	Total	1	2	3	4	5	6	7	8	9	10	11	12	13	14	15	16	17	18	19	20	Pts	Pos

m - exclusion for exceeding two minute time allowance • t - exclusion for touching the tapes • x - other exclusion • e - retired or mechanical failure • f - fell • ns - non-starter • nc - non-classify

gate A - inside	gate B	gate C	gate D - outside
