= Stefan Kwoczała =

Polish motorcycle speedway rider (1934–2019)

- Born: 15 June 1934; Kiedrzyn, Poland
- Died: 7 July 2019 (aged 85); Częstochowa, Poland
- Nationality: Polish

Career history

Poland
- 1955-1961: Częstochowa

Great Britain
- 1960: Leicester Hunters

Individual honours
- 1959: Polish Champion

Team honours
- 1959: Polish League Champion

Stefan Kwoczała (15 June 1934 – 7 July 2019) was a motorcycle speedway rider from Poland. He won the Polish championship in 1959 and reached the World Final in 1960, placing seventh. He earned three international caps for the Poland national speedway team.

== Career ==
Born in Kiedrzyn, Kwoczała rode for Włókniarz Częstochowa in the Polish league between 1955 and 1961, and in 1959 won the Polish championship at Rybnik. The same year, he won one of the continental rounds of the World Championship, but failed to qualify for the final.

Kwoczała finished third in the 1960 European final at Wrocław, qualifying for the World final at Wembley Stadium, in which he scored eight points to finish seventh.

Kwoczała also rode in the National League in the UK in 1960 becoming the first Pole to ride for Leicester Hunters and was allocated to them the following season.

Kwoczała's career ended after suffering a fractured skull in a crash at Kraków in 1961 during the Golden Helmet competition. After retiring from racing, he moved into coaching riders at Włókniarz Częstochowa and Gwardia Łódź.

== World Final Appearances ==
=== Individual World Championship ===
- 1960 - (England) London, Wembley Stadium - 7th - 7pts

== Death ==
Kwoczała died in Częstochowa during the night of 6/7 July 2019, aged 85.
