= Jack Kitchen =

British speedway rider

- Born: 2 August 1938; Lancaster, England
- Died: 21 July 1990 (aged 51); Lancaster, England
- Nationality: British (English)

Career history
- 1958–1963: Belle Vue Aces
- 1960, 1963–1966: Sheffield Tigers
- 1958: Bradford Boomerangs
- 1962: Bradford Panthers

Team honours
- 1958: National Trophy
- 1958: Britannia Shield
- 1963, 1964: Northern League

Christopher John Kitchen (2 August 1938 – 21 July 1990) was a motorcycle speedway rider from England. He earned two international caps for the Great Britain national speedway team.

== Career ==
Kitchen started his British leagues career in 1958 as he captained the Bradford Boomerangs junior side and in the 1958 Speedway National League, he rode for Belle Vue Aces, where he helped the team win the National Trophy. He would ride for the Manchester club for six years until the end of 1963. He also had spells with Bradford Panthers and Sheffield Tigers in the Provincial League.

From 1963, Kitchen rode for Sheffield and in 1965 topped the team's averages, which led him to represent Sheffield in the British League Riders' Championship.

Kitchen's last season was in 1966 and he retired aged just 28. He was involved in a crash that resulted in the death of Ivor Hughes in 1966, which seemed instrumental in his decision to retire.

== Family ==
His uncle Bill Kitchen was a speedway rider.
