= Reidar Kristoffersen =

Norwegian speedway driver

- Born: Norway
- Nationality: Norwegian

Individual honours
- 1954: Norwegian Champion

Reidar Kristoffersen is a former speedway rider from Norway. He became champion of Norway after winning the 1955 Norwegian Championship.

At the 1957 Individual Speedway World Championship, Kristoffersen finished runner-up behind Olle Nygren in the Nordic round at the Dælenenga idrettspark in Oslo.
