= Bob Roger =

British motorcycle speedway rider

- Born: 14 June 1928; Ashford, Kent, England
- Died: 17 December 2002 (aged 74)

Career history
- 1951: Exeter Falcons
- 1952–1953: New Cross Rangers
- 1953: Birmingham Brummies
- 1954–1958, 1961: Swindon Robins

Individual honours
- 1957: Speedway World Championship finalist

Team honours
- 1957: National League Champion
- 1956: National League Div 2 Champion
- 1951: National Trophy (Div 3) Winner
- 1953: Midland Cup

Robert William Roger (14 June 1928 – 17 December 2002) was an English international motorcycle speedway rider.

== Speedway career ==
Roger reached the final of the Speedway World Championship in the 1957 Individual Speedway World Championship.

Roger rode in the top tier of British Speedway from 1951 to 1962, riding primarily for Swindon Robins.

In 1951, the Exeter Falcons signed Roger, on loan from New Cross Rangers and with both Don Hardy and Goog Hoskin riding well, the team secured runner-up spot in the league and won the third tier National Trophy.

== Individual World Championship ==
- 1957 - (England) London, Wembley Stadium - 8th - 8pts

== Family ==
Roger's brothers Cyril and Bert were both speedway riders, and all three rode at the same time for New Cross.
