= Per Olof Söderman =

Swedish speedway rider (1932–2021)

- Born: 29 October 1932; Sweden
- Nickname: Peo Söderman
- Nationality: Swedish

Career history

Sweden
- 1952-1954, 1958, 1963-1973: Vargarna
- 1955: Getingarna
- 1956-1957: Filbyterna

Great Britain
- 1956-1958: Coventry Bees

Individual honours
- 1956, 1957, 1963, 1966: Speedway World Championship finalist

Team honours
- 1963: World Team Cup Winner
- 1953, 1954: Allsvenskan Champion
- 1964: Allsvenskan Div 2 Champion

Per Olof Söderman (born 29 October 1932) was a speedway rider from Sweden. During his racing career, he was also known as Peo Söderman. He earned 44 caps for the Sweden national speedway team.

== Speedway career ==
Söderman reached the final of the Speedway World Championship on four occasions in the 1956 Individual Speedway World Championship, 1957 Individual Speedway World Championship, 1963 Individual Speedway World Championship and 1966 Individual Speedway World Championship. He was also a two-time finalist at the Individual Speedway Long Track World Championship in 1965 and 1970.

Söderman rode in the top tier of British Speedway from 1956-58, riding for Coventry Bees.

== World Final appearances ==
=== Individual World Championship ===
- 1956 - (England) London, Wembley Stadium - 6th - 10pts
- 1957 - (England) London, Wembley Stadium - 9th - 7pts
- 1958 - (England) London, Wembley Stadium - Reserve - Did not ride
- 1963 - (England) London, Wembley Stadium - 12th - 5pts
- 1966 - (Sweden) Gothenburg, Ullevi - 16th - 1pt

=== World Team Cup ===
- 1963 - (Austria) Vienna, Stadion Wien (with Ove Fundin / Björn Knutson / Göte Nordin / Rune Sörmander) - Winner - 37pts (10)
