= Peter Craven =

English motorcycle racer (1934–1963)

- Born: 21 June 1934; Liverpool, England
- Died: 24 September 1963 (aged 29); Edinburgh, Scotland
- Nationality: British (English)

Career history
- 1951-1952: Liverpool Chads
- 1951: Fleetwood Flyers
- 1952–63: Belle Vue Aces

Individual honours
- 1955, 1962: World Champion
- 1957, 1959: Pride of the Midlands winner
- 1958, 1959, 1961: Pride of the East winner
- 1959: Tom Farndon Memorial winner
- 1962, 1963: British Champion

Team honours
- 1963: National League Champion
- 1957, 1958, 1960: Britannia Shield
- 1958: National Trophy

Peter Theodore Craven (21 June 1934 – 24 September 1963) was an English motorcycle racer. He was a finalist in each FIM Speedway World Championship from 1954 to 1963 and he won the title twice (in 1955 and 1962). He was British Champion in 1962 and 1963.

== Personal life ==
Craven was born in Liverpool and had four sisters and an older brother, Brian Craven, who also became a speedway rider. He also had a twin brother who died at an early age. He got his first racing experience when he started participating in cycle speedway.

== Career ==
Craven got his first taste of motorcycle speedway racing in 1949 at the Stanley Stadium, Prescot Road, Liverpool. He visited the stadium a day after his sixteenth birthday and drove a few laps on his brother's bike, before hitting the safety fence and sustaining a concussion. He was later given another chance to show his abilities to the Liverpool Chads, but after just one lap he hit the fence again. Despite this, he was included as a reserve in the team's away match against the Leicester Hunters.

Craven made eight league appearances for the Liverpool Chads in Division II during 1951, scoring eight points. and he was with the Chads when they finished thirteenth in Division Two. He also rode for the Fleetwood Flyers. The next year, he made 10 league appearances equally divided between Manchester's Belle Vue and the Liverpool Chads.

Craven made his Belle Vue debut on 17 May 1952 when he scored two points in a race against the visiting Norwich Stars. That season, he made four more league appearances for Belle Vue, but he only managed to score one point in those races combined.

In 1953, Craven became a regular Aces rider and scored 70 points in 12 matches, but the British Army required his services, and he missed several matches.

He continued racing for Belle Vue during his national service. During 1954, he made 24 league appearances and top-scored for his club. He qualified for his first Wembley World final and scored one point more than the brilliant Swedish rider Ove Fundin. About this time as a young man, he owned his Jowett Jupiter road car which still exists. In 1955, on his second try, Peter sensationally won the first of his two FIM World Championships at Wembley. During the qualifying he topped the second round points scorers for the second successive year.

In 1958, Craven captained the English team against Sweden in Sweden, finishing top scorer; he also top-scored in the five-test series against Australasia.

In 1959, Craven took on Ove Fundin and won the Golden Helmet Match Race Championship, the Champions of Champions Cup at Wimborne Road; the Northern Cup at Belle Vue; the Internationale Derby at Ipswich; the Pride of the East at Norwich; the Tom Farndon Memorial Trophy at New Cross; the Champagne Derby again at Belle Vue, the CTS Trophy at Norwich and the Pride of the Midlands at Leicester.

At the end of 1959, Craven travelled to Australia where he spent the 1959/60 Australian season riding at the Rowley Park Speedway in Adelaide where he regularly rode against Adelaide's own 1951 and 1952 World Champion Jack Young. Craven proved to be a popular rider in Adelaide.

In 1960, Craven came third in the World Championship final staged at Wembley when Ove Fundin beat Ronnie Moore into second place after a thrilling run off, all three riders having scored an equal number of points after their five rides. During 1961, he captained the Lions on a tour to Austria. He came third in the first FIM Internationale Individual Trophy meeting at the Harringay Stadium and was second in the British Final at Wembley.

1962 was another good year for Craven. He followed his three British Championship victories by carrying off his second World Individual Championship at Wembley in front of 62,000 fans.

Craven's son Robert was also a speedway rider.

== World final appearances ==
=== Individual World Championship ===
- 1954 - (England) London, Wembley Stadium - 15th - 3pts
- 1955 - (England) London, Wembley Stadium - Winner - 13pts
- 1956 - (England) London, Wembley Stadium - 4th - 11pts + 2pts
- 1957 - (England) London, Wembley Stadium - 3rd - 11pts + 3pts
- 1958 - (England) London, Wembley Stadium - 4th - 11pts + 2pts
- 1959 - (England) London, Wembley Stadium - 9th - 7pts
- 1960 - (England) London, Wembley Stadium - 3rd - 14pts + 1pt
- 1961 - (Sweden) Malmö, Malmö Stadion - 10th - 6pts
- 1962 - (England) London, Wembley Stadium - Winner - 14pts
- 1963 - (England) London, Wembley Stadium - 10th - 6pts

=== World Team Cup ===
- 1960* - (Sweden) Gothenburg, Ullevi (with Ron How / Ken McKinlay / Nigel Boocock / George White) - 2nd - 30pts (8)
- 1961* - (Poland) Wrocław, Olympic Stadium (with Ron How / Bob Andrews / Ken McKinlay) - 3rd - 21pts (8)
- 1962 - (Czechoslovakia) Slaný (with Barry Briggs / Ronnie Moore / Ron How / Cyril Maidment) - 2nd - 24pts (6)
- 1963 - (Austria) Vienna, Stadion Wien (with Barry Briggs / Dick Fisher / Peter Moore) - 3rd - 25pts (8)

* 1960 and 1961 for England. All others for Great Britain.

== Death ==
Craven died as a result of a racing accident in a challenge match at Edinburgh's Old Meadowbank stadium on 20 September 1963. While taking evasive action to avoid hitting fallen race leader George Hunter who suffered engine failure, he hit a fence. The unconscious Craven was rushed to the Royal Infirmary of Edinburgh, where his family remained at his bedside until he died at 9.10pm on Tuesday 24 September 1963.

There are allegations made that Craven had started ten yards behind the other riders by way of a handicap. In 1963, in National League and National Trophy matches Craven, as a 'star grade rider' would start with a twenty-yard handicap. However, in this challenge match, Peter was actually at the tapes with the other riders but allowed the others to pull away ahead of him to make the racing more exciting.

Since 1967, there has been a Peter Craven Memorial meeting held intermittently at the Belle Vue Stadium in honour of his memory. Winners of the Memorial have included World Champions Ivan Mauger (the inaugural winner), Ole Olsen, Peter Collins, Greg Hancock, Jason Crump and Chris Morton

Craven's gravestone stands in West Derby Cemetery in Liverpool.

== See also ==
Rider deaths in motorcycle speedway
