= Ron Johnston =

New Zealand speedway rider

- Born: 31 December 1930 (age 95); Dunedin, New Zealand
- Died: 29 July 2014 (aged 83)

Career history
- 1950: Sheffield Tars
- 1950–1961: Belle Vue Aces

Individual honours
- 1959: Johnnie Hoskins Trophy
- 1952: New Zealand champion

Team honours
- 1957, 1958, 1960: Britannia Shield
- 1958: National Trophy

Ronald Johnston (31 December 1930 – 29 July 2014) was a New Zealand motorcycle speedway rider, who rode for the Belle Vue Aces. He also rode in four World Finals (1955, 1957, 1958 and 1960) during his career finishing a best fifth in 1960. He earned 16 caps for the New Zealand national speedway team.

== Career ==
Johnston began riding at the Tahuna Park track in Dunedin in 1949. He moved to England in 1950 and joined the Belle Vue Aces. In his first season, he was at first loaned out to the Belfast Bees and the Sheffield Tigers before establishing himself as a member of the Belle Vue team. He captained the team from 1957 until his retirement at the end of 1961. Under his captaincy, Belle Vue won the Britannia Shield three times, and the Daily Mail National Trophy in 1958.

Johnston won the 1952 New Zealand Championship, and he rode for Australasian teams in England and on the continent.

Johnston was the captain of New Zealand during the test match series against England national speedway team in 1952/53.

== World Final Appearances ==
- 1955 – (England) London, Wembley Stadium – 12th – 6pts
- 1957 – (England) London, Wembley Stadium – 6th – 9pts
- 1958 – (England) London, Wembley Stadium – 8th – 8pts
- 1960 – (England) London, Wembley Stadium – 5th – 10pts
