= Olle Nygren =

Swedish speedway rider (1929–2021)

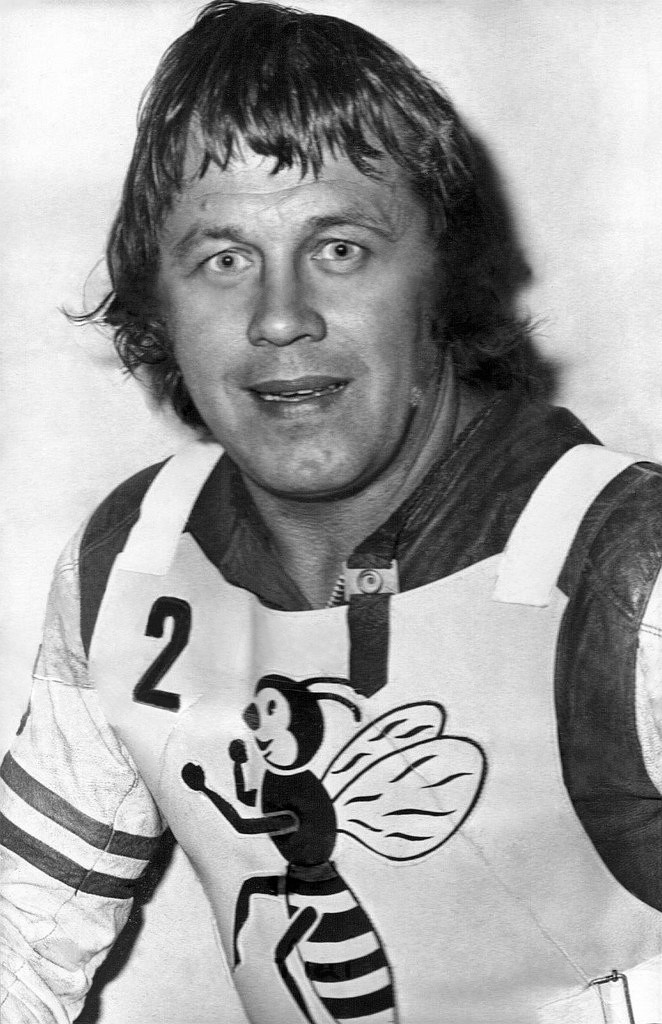
- Olle Nygren in the 1970s
- Born: 11 November 1929; Stockholm, Sweden
- Died: 13 February 2021 (aged 91); Ipswich, England
- Nickname: Varg-Olle
- Nationality: Swedish

Career history

Sweden
- 1948-1953, 1960, 1962-1963, 1967-1979: Vargarna
- 1954-1959: Monarkerna

Great Britain
- 1951: Harringay Racers
- 1953: New Cross Rangers
- 1953: Bristol Bulldogs
- 1954, 1965-1968: Wimbledon Dons
- 1960: Southampton Saints
- 1962: Swindon Robins
- 1962-1964: Norwich Stars
- 1969-1971: West Ham Hammers
- 1972-1974: Ipswich Witches
- 1974: Coventry Bees
- 1975: King's Lynn Stars

Individual honours
- 1954, 1960: Nordic Champion
- 1949: Swedish Champion

Team honours
- 1960: World Team Cup
- 1968: British League KO Cup winner
- 1968: London Cup Winner
- 1949, 1951, 1953, 1955, 1956, 1960: Allsvenskan Champion
- 1963: National Trophy

Harald Olof Ingemar Nygren (11 November 1929 – 13 February 2021) was a Swedish motorcycle speedway rider, who reached the finals of the Speedway World Championship five times. He earned 90 caps for the Sweden national speedway team.

== Career ==
Nygren was the inaugural Swedish Champion during the 1949 Swedish speedway season. He also helped his Swedish team Vargarna win the Swedish Speedway Team Championship. He started riding in Great Britain during the 1951 Speedway National League, when he joined the Harringay Racers.

Nygren soon established himself as a leading rider, recording exceptional averages for New Cross Rangers and then Bristol Bulldogs during the 1953 Speedway National League season. After a season with Wimbledon Dons in 1954 he would not ride in Britain again until 1960. In the meantime, he reached several world finals and was considered a world class rider, winning his second Nordic Championship and the World Team Cup in 1960.

Nygren returned to British speedway in 1960 and would ride until the end of the 1975 season, regularly topping the team averages. He would ride for Swindon Robins, Norwich Stars, West Ham Hammers, Ipswich Witches, Coventry Bees and King's Lynn Stars.

After retirement, Nygren set up a successful speedway training school. Nygren lived in England from the 1960s. He died in Ipswich at the age of 91, after contracting COVID-19; he had previously been treated for laryngeal cancer.

== World Final appearances ==
=== Individual World Championship ===
- 1953 – (England) London, Wembley Stadium – 4th - 12+2pts
- 1954 – (England) London, Wembley Stadium – 3rd - 13+2pts
- 1955 – (England) London, Wembley Stadium – 8th - 9pts
- 1958 – (England) London, Wembley Stadium – 7th - 9pts
- 1959 – (England) London, Wembley Stadium – 4th - 11+2pts

=== World Team Cup ===
- 1960 - (Sweden) Gothenburg, Ullevi (with Ove Fundin / Rune Sörmander / Björn Knutson) - Winner - 44pts (12)
- 1968 - (England) London, Wembley Stadium (with Bengt Jansson / Anders Michanek / Ove Fundin / Torbjörn Harrysson) - 2nd - 30pts (3)

== World Longtrack Championship ==
- 1957 - Semi-final
- 1958 - (West Germany) Muhldorf (14th)
- 1959 - (Finland) Helsinki (Third)
- 1960 - (West Germany) Plattling (9th)
- 1961 - (Norway) Oslo (Second)
- 1978 - Qualifying Round
- 1979 - Qualifying Round

== Formula One ==
In 1962, Nygren took part in a minor Formula One race, the Kanonloppet, at the Karlskoga Circuit at Karlskoga in his home country of Sweden. He drove a Lotus 18 loaned to him by American driver Jay Chamberlain. Nygren qualified tenth of the ten starters, and had to retire after just six laps with a gearbox failure.

=== Non-Championship Formula One results ===
(key)

Year	Entrant	Chassis	Engine	1	2	3	4	5	6	7	8	9	10	11	12	13	14	15	16	17	18	19	20
1962	Ecurie Excelsior	Lotus 18	Climax Straight-4	CAP	BRX	LOM	LAV	GLV	PAU	AIN	INT	NAP	MAL	CLP	RMS	SOL	KAN; Ret	MED	DAN	OUL	MEX	RAN	NAT
