= Ronnie Moore (speedway rider) =

New Zealand speedway rider (1933–2018)

Ronnie Moore MBE
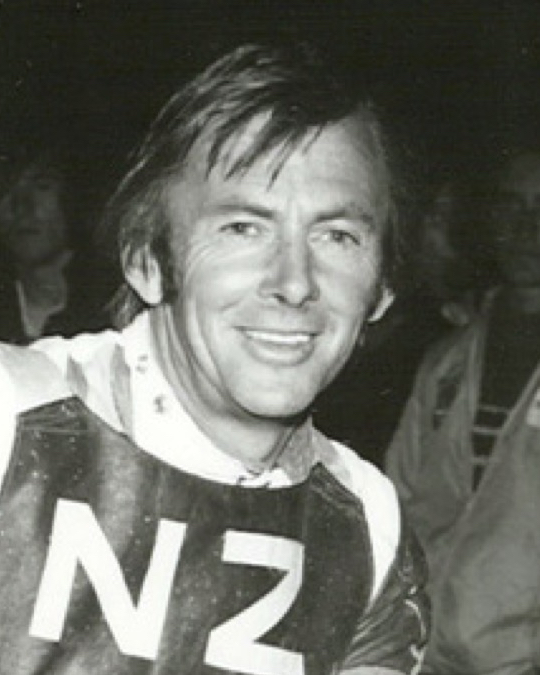
- Moore in 1973
- Born: 8 March 1933; Hobart, Tasmania, Australia
- Died: 18 August 2018 (aged 85); Christchurch, New Zealand
- Nationality: New Zealander

Career history
- 1950–63, 1969–72: Wimbledon Dons
- 1974: Coventry Bees

Individual honours
- 1954, 1959: World Champion
- 1952, 1972: London Riders' Champion
- 1952, 1960: Brandonapolis
- 1952, 1955, 1956, 1960: The Laurels
- 1956, 1962, 1968, 1969: New Zealand Champion
- 1960: Tom Farndon Memorial winner

Team honours
- 1970: World Pairs Champion
- 1954, 1955, 1956, 1958, 1959, 1960, 1961: National League winner
- 1950, 1951, 1953, 1956, 1959, 1960, 1962: National Trophy winner
- 1962: National League KO Cup winner
- 1969, 1970: British League KO Cup Winner
- 1969, 1970: London Cup Winner
- 1954: RAC Cup Winner
- 1959: Britannia Shield Winner

Ronald Leslie Moore MBE (8 March 1933 – 18 August 2018) was a New Zealand international motorcycle speedway rider. He twice won the Individual World Speedway Championship, in 1954 and 1959. He earned 13 international caps for the Australia national speedway team, 50 caps for the New Zealand national speedway team and 21 caps for the Great Britain national speedway team.

== Biography ==
Moore was born in Hobart, Tasmania in 1933. He moved with his family to New Zealand when he was still a child, and although he was born in Australia, Moore always considered himself to be a New Zealander and rode under the flag of his adopted home.

Moore began riding at the Aranui Speedway in Christchurch, New Zealand, in 1949 at the age of 15. He moved to England and rode for the Wimbledon Dons from 1950 to 1956. In 1950 at the age of 17, Moore was the youngest rider ever to qualify for the final of the Speedway World Championship. Moore represented Australia in Test Match series in England in 1951, 1952 and 1953, although subsequently he raced for New Zealand, and Australasia (combined Australia and New Zealand), as well as representing Great Britain in the World Team Cup.

Moore was twice the champion of the world, winning the title in both 1954 and again in 1959, he also finished runner up on three further occasions. His first win came when he was only 21 years of age, riding with a broken leg, and he won with a maximum score.

In 1957 and 1958, Moore switched his attention to motor racing, but returned to ride for the Dons in late 1958 and stayed with them until 1963 when he decided to retire from racing after breaking his leg in a track crash. He began riding again in New Zealand in the mid-1960s and made a comeback with Wimbledon in 1969 and reached the World Final at the age of 36. In 1970, he won the World Pairs Championship with Ivan Mauger.

Moore retired from racing in the British League at the end of 1972, apart from a couple of meetings for Coventry Bees in August 1974, but continued riding speedway until 1975 when he suffered severe head injuries in a crash at Jerilderie Park Speedway in New South Wales.

Moore won the New Zealand Championship in 1956, 1962, 1968 and 1969.

== World final appearances ==
=== Individual World Championship ===
- 1950 – (England) London, Wembley Stadium – 10th – 7pts
- 1951 – (England) London, Wembley Stadium – 4th – 11pts
- 1952 – (England) London, Wembley Stadium – 4th – 10pts
- 1953 – (England) London, Wembley Stadium – 6th – 9pts
- 1954 – (England) London, Wembley Stadium – Winner – 15pts
- 1955 – (England) London, Wembley Stadium – 2nd – 12pts + 3pts
- 1956 – (England) London, Wembley Stadium – 2nd – 12pts
- 1958 – (England) London, Wembley Stadium – 6th – 9pts
- 1959 – (England) London, Wembley Stadium – Winner – 15pts
- 1960 – (England) London, Wembley Stadium – 2nd – 14pts + 2pts
- 1961 – (Sweden) Malmö, Malmö Stadion – 6th – 10pts
- 1962 – (England) London, Wembley Stadium – 5th – 9pts
- 1969 – (England) London, Wembley Stadium – 11th – 6pts
- 1970 – (Poland) Wrocław, Olympic Stadium – Reserve – Did Not Ride
- 1971 – (Sweden) Gothenburg, Ullevi – 10th – 5pts

=== World Pairs Championship ===
- 1970 – (Sweden) Malmö, Malmö Stadion (with Ivan Mauger) – Winner – 28pts (16)
- 1972 – (Sweden) Borås (with Ivan Mauger) – 2nd – 24pts (10)

=== World Team Cup ===
- 1962 – (Czech Republic) Slaný (with Barry Briggs / Peter Craven / Ron How / Cyril Maidment) – 2nd – 24pts (10)

Note: Moore rode for Great Britain in the World Team Cup from 1962

== After speedway ==
Moore was appointed a Member of the Order of the British Empire (MBE) in the 1985 Queen's Birthday Honours, for services to speedway sport. The Canterbury Park Motorcycle Speedway was renamed the Moore Park Motorcycle Speedway in his honour and the Ronnie Moore race school operates out of the speedway.

Moore died on 18 August 2018 in Christchurch from lung cancer, aged 85.
