= Ron How =

British motorcycle speedway rider (1929–2011)

- Born: 23 December 1929; Little Missenden, England
- Died: 10 October 2011 (aged 81); Great Missenden, England
- Nationality: British (English)

Career history
- 1951-1954: Harringay Racers
- 1955-1963: Wimbledon Dons
- 1964-1965: Oxford Cheetahs

Individual honours
- 1959: Southern Riders' Championship

Team honours
- 1955, 1956, 1958, 1959, 1960, 1961, 1964: National League winner
- 1952, 1956, 1959, 1960, 1962, 1964: National Trophy winner
- 1962: National League KO Cup winner
- 1952, 1953: London Cup Winner
- 1953: Coronation Cup Winner
- 1959, 1964: Britannia Shield Winner

Ronald How (23 December 1929 – 10 October 2011) was an international motorcycle speedway rider from England.

== Career summary ==
How won seven Championships and six National Trophy wins in a 15-season career.

How began riding for Harringay Racers in 1952 and stayed with them for four seasons. After leaving Harringay, he rode for Wimbledon Dons from 1955 to 1963, he sustained a significant ankle injury in 1959.

How also won the Southern Riders' Championship in 1959 and the Pride of the Nations Trophy in 1963.

At retirement, How had ridden in eight Speedway World Championships and won 44 caps for the England national speedway team and 12 caps for the Great Britain team.

== World final appearances ==
=== Individual World Championship ===
- 1952 – (England) London, Wembley Stadium – 16th – 0pts
- 1957 – (England) London, Wembley Stadium – 11th – 7pts
- 1958 – (England) London, [Wembley Stadium – 10th – 7pts
- 1959 – (England) London, Wembley Stadium – 14th – 3pts
- 1961 – (Sweden) Malmö, Malmö Stadion – 9th – 7pts
- 1962 – (England) London, Wembley Stadium – 12th – 6pts
- 1963 – (England) London, Wembley Stadium – 9th – 7pts
- 1964 – (Sweden) Gothenburg, Ullevi – 6th – 10pts

=== World Team Cup ===
- 1960* – (Sweden) Gothenburg, Ullevi (with Peter Craven / George White / Ken McKinlay / Nigel Boocock) – 2nd – 30pts (7)
- 1961* – (Poland) Wrocław, Olympic Stadium (with Bob Andrews / Peter Craven / Ken McKinlay) – 3rd – 21pts (3)
- 1962 – (Czechoslovakia) Slaný, Slaný Race track (with Barry Briggs / Ronnie Moore / Peter Craven / Cyril Maidment) – 2nd – 24pts (0)
- 1964 – (West Germany) Abensberg, Abensberg Stadion (with Barry Briggs / Nigel Boocock / Ken McKinlay / Brian Brett) – 3rd – 21pts (2)

* 1960 and 1961 for England. All others for Great Britain.
