= Les Owen =

British motorcycle speedway rider

- Born: 21 April 1939; Coventry, England
- Died: 15 January 2004 (aged 64); Canley, England
- Nationality: British (English)

Career history
- 1957–1973: Coventry Bees

Team honours
- 1968: League champion (tier 1)
- 1967: Knockout Cup
- 1960, 1966, 1969, 1970, 1971: Midland Cup
- 1961: Central Shield

Leslie Norman Owen (21 April 1939 – 15 January 2004) was an international motorcycle speedway rider from England. He earned two international caps for the England national speedway team and one cap for the Great Britain team.

== Biography ==
Owen, born in Coventry, attended Barkers' Butts School before riding in cycle speedway for a team called Alvis Aces. He began his British leagues career riding for Coventry Bees during the 1957 Speedway National League.

Owen would spend his entire career at one club, which was extremely unusual in British speedway and during his time with Coventry his average would peak at 7.61 in 1962. He rode 17 years for the team until the end of the 1973 season.

Successes with Coventry included winning the Knockout Cup in 1967 and becoming league champions during the 1968 British League season. He also won five Midland Cups with the team, the first in 1960 and the last in 1971.

Owen's career came to an end following a serious crash, which saw him suffer a brain injury leaving him paralysed down one side and with short-term memory loss. After speedway, he ran the Ace Garage business that he had bought in 1969. He was killed in a rail level crossing accident on 15 January 2004.
