= Ken McKinlay =

British speedway rider (1928–2003)

- Born: 7 June 1928; Blantyre, Scotland
- Died: 9 February 2003 (aged 74)
- Nationality: British (Scottish)

Career history
- 1949–1954: Glasgow Tigers
- 1954–1961: Leicester Hunters
- 1962–1964, 1970: Coventry Bees
- 1965–1969: West Ham Hammers
- 1971–1972: Oxford Cheetahs
- 1973–1975: Scunthorpe Saints
- 1973: King's Lynn Stars
- 1973: Coatbridge Tigers
- 1973: Cradley Heathens

Individual honours
- 1955, 1956, 1959: Midland Riders' Champion
- 1955, 1965: Brandonapolis
- 1959: The Laurels
- 1964: Australian Champion
- 1957: SA State Champion
- 1959, 1961: Victorian State Champion
- 1960: NSW State Champion
- 1964: Queensland State Champion
- 1966: WA State Champion

Team honours
- 1965: British League Champions
- 1965: British League KO Cup Winners
- 1965, 1966, 1967: London Cup winner
- 1952, 1953: Scottish Cup winner
- 1970: Midland Cup Winner

John Robert Vickers (Ken) McKinlay (7 June 1928 – 9 February 2003) was a British international motorcycle speedway rider. He earned 23 caps for the Scotland national speedway team, 92 caps for the England national speedway team and 23 caps for the Great Britain team.

== Career ==
McKinlay from High Blantyre Lanarkshire, was a farmer and grocer before he took up speedway while serving with the British Army in Germany, riding as a despatch rider and for the Neumünster forces team. He went on to captain the team and finished in joint sixth place in the 1948 Combined Services Speedway Championship. On his return to Britain, he started his career with the Glasgow Tigers in 1949 and had five successful seasons there. However, in 1954 the track closed and Ken transferred to the Leicester Hunters for a club record fee. He spent eight seasons with the Hunters, moving up with them into the First Division in 1957, and averaging close to 11 points in the 1958 and 1959 seasons. A spell with the Coventry Bees followed after Leicester dropped down to the Provincial League. He also finished on the rostrum of the British Speedway Championship finals twice, second in 1964 and third in 1965.

When the British League was formed in 1965, McKinlay was allocated to the West Ham Hammers, and as captain led them to winning the 1965 treble of League Championship, KO Cup and London KO Cup trophies. He was renowned for his team-riding with younger riders and his contribution throughout his five seasons with the Hammers was immeasurable.

1970 saw McKinlay return to the Coventry Bees for one season before he moved to the Oxford Cheetahs for a further two seasons. McKinlay considered retirement but in 1973 he was approached by the management of the Scunthorpe Saints to become rider/coach of the second division side. He stayed with the Saints for three seasons before retiring in 1975 aged forty-seven.

While still a Second Division rider with Leicester, McKinlay rode for England in the 1955 Test series against Australasia, top scoring for England in the third test with 11 points, and going on to represent England regularly until the early 1970s.

McKinlay was also a success when he ventured to Australia to race in the late 1950s and through the 1960s, winning the Australian Individual Speedway Championship in 1964 at Sydney Showground Speedway. He placed third in 1967 at Adelaide's Rowley Park Speedway and tied for second in 1969, again at the Sydney Showground. McKinlay was also successful in various Australian state championships. He won the South Australian Championship in 1957 at Rowley Park, the Victorian Championship in 1959 and again in 1961 as well as the NSW championship at the Showground in 1960. He also traveled to Brisbane to win the Queensland championship in 1964 at the Brisbane Exhibition Ground and in 1966 he traveled to Australia's west coast where he won the Western Australian championship at Perth's 550m Claremont Speedway.

McKinlay had two short spells as team managers of Scunthorpe and Long Eaton. He died in 2003 aged seventy four.

== World Final Appearances ==
=== Individual World Championship ===
- 1955 – (England) London, Wembley Stadium- Reserve – did not ride
- 1956 – (England) London, Wembley Stadium – 5th – 10pts
- 1957 – (England) London, Wembley Stadium – 7th – 8pts
- 1958 – (England) London, Wembley Stadium – 5th – 11pts + 1pt
- 1959 – (England) London, Wembley Stadium – Reserve – did not ride
- 1960 – (England) London, Wembley Stadium – 9th – 6pts
- 1961 – (Sweden) Malmö, Malmö Stadion – 11th – 5pts
- 1962 – (England) London, Wembley Stadium – 7th – 9pts
- 1964 – (Sweden) Gothenburg, Ullevi – 11th – 6pts
- 1965 – (England) London, Wembley Stadium – 13th – 4pts
- 1966 – (Sweden) Göteborg, Ullevi – Reserve – did not ride
- 1969 – (England) London, Wembley Stadium – 8th – 7pts

=== World Team Cup ===
- 1960* – (Sweden) Göteborg, Ullevi (with Peter Craven / Ron How / Nigel Boocock / George White) – 2nd – 30pts (8)
- 1961* – (Poland) Wrocław, Olympic Stadium (with Ron How / Bob Andrews / Peter Craven) – 3rd – 21pts (4)
- 1964 – (West Germany) Abensberg, Abensberg Stadion (with Ron How / Barry Briggs / Nigel Boocock / Brian Brett) – 3rd – 21pts (7)
- 1965 – (West Germany) Kempten Illerstadion (with Barry Briggs / Charlie Monk / Nigel Boocock / Jimmy Gooch) – 3rd – 18pts (7)

* 1960 and 1961 for England. All others for Great Britain.
