= Arne Pander =

Danish speedway rider

- Born: 12 July 1931; Herning, Denmark
- Died: 22 May 2015 (aged 83)
- Nationality: Danish

Career history
- 1959–1961, 1963–1968: Oxford Cheetahs
- 1968: Poole Pirates
- 1969: Halifax Dukes

Individual honours
- 1956, 1958: Danish Champion
- 1965: Scottish Open Champion

Team honours
- 1964: National League Champion
- 1964: National Trophy Winner
- 1964: Britannia Shield winner

Arne Pander (12 July 1931 – 22 May 2015) was an international motorcycle speedway rider from Denmark. He earned 16 caps for the Denmark national speedway team.

== Speedway career ==
Pander was a two-time champion of Denmark, winning the Danish Championship in 1956 and 1958.

Pander rode in the top tiers of British Speedway from 1959 to 1968, riding for Oxford Cheetahs, although he missed the 1962 season for them. He broke his leg before early in the 1968 season.
