= Ove Fundin =

Swedish motorcycle speedway rider

- Born: 23 May 1933 (age 93); Tranås, Sweden
- Nickname: The Fox or The Flying Fox
- Nationality: Swedish

Career history

Sweden
- 1951-1957: Filbyterna
- 1958-1971: Kaparna

Great Britain
- 1955-1964: Norwich Stars
- 1966: Long Eaton Archers
- 1967: Belle Vue Aces
- 1970: Wembley Lions

Individual honours
- 1956, 1960, 1961, 1963, 1967: World Champion
- 1956, 1957, 1960, 1962, 1964, 1966, 1967, 1969, 1970: Swedish Champion
- 1954: Continental Champion
- 1956, 1958, 1959, 1961, 1965: European Champion
- 1955, 1961, 1963, 1967: Nordic Champion
- 1957: Pride of the East winner
- 1960: Southern Riders Champion
- 1963: Pride of the Midlands winner
- 1960/61: SA State Champion
- 1969: WA State Champion
- 1967: Golden Helmet of Pardubice
- 1961, 1962, 1963: Internationale
- 1962: The Laurels

Team honours
- 1960, 1962, 1963, 1964, 1967, 1970: World Team Cup
- 1968: World Pairs Champion
- 1968, 1970: Allsvenskan Champion
- 1955, 1963: National Trophy

Competition record

Representing Sweden

Speedway World Championship
Gold medal – first place	1956	
Gold medal – first place	1960	
Gold medal – first place	1961	
Gold medal – first place	1963	
Gold medal – first place	1967	
Silver medal – second place	1957	
Silver medal – second place	1958	
Silver medal – second place	1959	
Bronze medal – third place	1962	
Bronze medal – third place	1964	
Bronze medal – third place	1965	

Speedway World Team Cup
Gold medal – first place	1960	
Gold medal – first place	1962	
Gold medal – first place	1963	
Gold medal – first place	1964	
Gold medal – first place	1967	
Gold medal – first place	1970	
Silver medal – second place	1961	
Silver medal – second place	1965	
Silver medal – second place	1968	
Bronze medal – third place	1966	

Speedway World Pairs Championship
Gold medal – first place	1968	
Silver medal – second place	1969	
Silver medal – second place	1970	

Golden Helmet
Gold medal – first place	1967	
Silver medal – second place	1968	

Long Track World Championship
Silver medal – second place	1961	

Ove Fundin (born 23 May 1933) is a Swedish former professional motorcycle speedway rider. He competed in the Speedway World Championships from 1951 to 1970. Fundin is notable for winning the Speedway World Championship Final five times (1956, 1960, 1961, 1963, 1967), a record bettered only by New Zealand's Ivan Mauger and fellow Swede Tony Rickardsson who each won six World Championships. He finished runner-up in the championship 3 times (1957–59) and was third in 1962, 1964 and 1965, meaning that from his first win in 1956 until his last in 1967, Fundin did not finish lower than a podium place in a record eleven World Finals. He was known by the nickname the "Flying Fox" or just "the Fox" because of his red hair. He earned 99 caps for the Sweden national speedway team.

== Career ==
Fundin was born in Tranås. It was suggested to him by Australian champion Aub Lawson that he ride in Britain and he joined the Norwich Stars, riding for them from 1955 until 1964 when the Firs stadium closed. Then he rode for Long Eaton 1966, Belle Vue 1967, Wembley 1970 but will always be remembered for the glory days at Norwich Stars where he was worshiped by the home fans.

Fundin made a total of 15 World Final appearances, being runner-up three times and third three times as well as his five wins. He also helped Sweden win the World Team Cup in 1960, 1962, 1963, 1964, 1967 and 1970 as well as the Speedway World Pairs Championship in 1968. He is considered to be one of the greatest riders of all time (along with the likes of Ivan Mauger and Hans Nielsen). Fundin went through the World Team Cup (including qualifying rounds and the final in Gothenburg) undefeated in 1960, a feat not matched until Australia's Jason Crump went through the 2001 Speedway World Cup undefeated.

Fundin won the Wimbledon Internationale for three consecutive years from 1961 to 1963.

Fundin also made several visits to Australia during his career with considerable success. Along with representing Sweden and various "Rest of the World" teams in Test Matches against the Australians, he won the South Australian Championship four times (1966, 1967, 1969, 1970) at the Rowley Park Speedway in Adelaide, and the Western Australian Championship at the Claremont Speedway in Perth in 1969.

Fundin won a record nine Swedish Championships.

== Awards ==
In 1961, Fundin and motocross competitor Sten Lundin were awarded the Svenska Dagbladet Gold Medal for the most significant Swedish sports achievement of the year. It marked the first time that the award had recognised the sport of motorcycling.

Fundin was honoured as a Freeman of the City of Norwich in 2006, only the second non-English person to be awarded this honour. The ceremony was completed at Norwich City Hall Council chamber by the Lord Mayor of Norwich on 30 October 2006.

In 2013, Fundin was named an FIM Legend for his motorcycling achievements.

== After retirement ==
Fundin currently lives on the French Riviera. In 2024, he joined a charity cycling team at the end of their journey in aid of the Speedway Riders Benevolent Fund.

== World Final appearances ==
=== Individual World Championship ===
- 1954 - (England) London, Wembley Stadium - 16th - 2pts
- 1955 - (England) London, Wembley Stadium - 6th - 10pts
- 1956 - (England) London, Wembley Stadium - Winner - 13pts
- 1957 - (England) London, Wembley Stadium - 2nd - 14pts + 2pts
- 1958 - (England) London, Wembley Stadium - 2nd - 13pts
- 1959 - (England) London, Wembley Stadium - 2nd - 13pts
- 1960 - (England) London, Wembley Stadium - Winner - 14pts + 3pts
- 1961 - (Sweden) Malmö, Malmö Stadion - Winner - 14pts
- 1962 - (England) London, Wembley Stadium - 3rd - 10pts + 3pts
- 1963 - (England) London, Wembley Stadium - Winner - 14pts
- 1964 - (Sweden) Gothenburg, Ullevi - 3rd - 13pts + 2pts
- 1965 - (England) London, Wembley Stadium - 3rd - 13pts + 2pts
- 1967 - (England) London, Wembley Stadium - Winner - 14pts + 3pts
- 1968 - (Sweden) Gothenburg, Ullevi - 9th - 7pts
- 1969 - (England) London, Wembley Stadium - 7th - 9pts

=== World Pairs Championship ===
- 1968* - (West Germany) Kempten, Illerstadion (with Torbjörn Harrysson) - Winner - 24pts (14)
- 1969* - (Sweden) Stockholm, Gubbängens IP (with Göte Nordin) - 2nd - 27pts (15)
- 1970 - (Sweden) Malmö, Malmö Stadion (with Bengt Jansson) - 2nd - 25pts (15)

* Unofficial World Championships.

=== World Team Cup ===
- 1960 - (Sweden) Gothenburg, Ullevi (with Olle Nygren / Rune Sörmander / Björn Knutson) - Winner - 44pts (12)
- 1961 - (Poland) Wrocław, Olympic Stadium (with Sören Sjösten / Rune Sörmander / Björn Knutson / Per Tage Svensson) - 2nd - 30pts (11)
- 1962 - (Czech Republic) Slaný (with Björn Knutson / Sören Sjösten / Göte Nordin / Rune Sörmander) - Winner - 36pts (9)
- 1963 - (Austria) Vienna, Stadion Wien (with Björn Knutson / Per Olof Söderman / Göte Nordin / Rune Sörmander) - Winner - 37pts (7)
- 1964 - (West Germany) Abensberg, Abensberg Stadion (with Björn Knutson / Göte Nordin / Rune Sörmander / Sören Sjösten) - Winner - 34pts (6)
- 1965 - (West Germany) Kempten, Illerstadion (with Björn Knutson / Bengt Jansson / Göte Nordin) - 2nd - 23pts (8)
- 1966 - (Poland) Wrocław, Olympic Stadium (with Björn Knutson / Leif Enecrona / Göte Nordin / Leif Larsson) - 3rd - 22pts (2)
- 1967 - (Sweden) Malmö, Malmö Stadion (with Göte Nordin / Bengt Jansson / Torbjörn Harrysson) - Winner - 32pts (6)
- 1968 - (England) London, Wembley Stadium (with Bengt Jansson / Anders Michanek / Olle Nygren / Torbjörn Harrysson) - 2nd - 30pts (11)
- 1969 - (Poland) Rybnik, Rybnik Municipal Stadium (with Bengt Jansson / Sören Sjösten / Anders Michanek / Torbjörn Harrysson) - 4th - 12pts (2)
- 1970 - (England) London, Wembley Stadium (with Bengt Jansson / Anders Michanek / Sören Sjösten) - Winner - 42pts (11)

== World Longtrack Championship ==
- 1959 - Semi-final
- 1961 - (Norway) Oslo (Second)
- 1962 - (West Germany) Mühldorf (12th)
- 1966 - Qualifying Round

Preceded by Jane Cederqvist	Svenska Dagbladet Gold Medal . (with Sten Lundin); 1961	Succeeded by Assar Rönnlund
