= Jack Geran =

Australian speedway rider (1929–2021)

- Born: 10 December 1929
- Died: 20 June 2021 (aged 91)
- Nationality: Australian

Career history
- 1952-1955, 1965-1967: Exeter Falcons
- 1956: Poole Pirates
- 1957-1961: Leicester Hunters
- 1962-1964: Oxford Cheetahs

Individual honours
- 1957, 1958: Speedway World Championship finalist
- 1958, 1961: Midland Riders' Champion

Team honours
- 1964: National League Champion
- 1964: National Trophy Winner
- 1964: Britannia Shield

John Francis Geran (10 December 1929 – 20 June 2021) was an international motorcycle speedway rider from Australia.

== Speedway career ==
Geran reached the final of the Speedway World Championship on two occasions: in the 1957 Individual Speedway World Championship and the 1958 Individual Speedway World Championship.

In 1952, Geran joined Exeter Falcons and then rode in the top tier of British Speedway from 1952 to 1964, riding for various clubs.

== World Final Appearances ==
=== Individual World Championship ===
- 1957 - (England) London, Wembley Stadium - 10th - 7pts
- 1958 - (England) London, Wembley Stadium - 14th - 3pts
