= Ian Williams (speedway rider) =

Welsh speedway rider (1931–2024)

- Born: 4 August 1931; Port Talbot, Wales
- Died: 18 October 2024 (aged 93)
- Nationality: British (Welsh)

Career history
- 1952–1963: Swindon Robins

Individual honours
- 1957: Speedway World Championship finalist

Team honours
- 1957: National League Champion
- 1956: National League Div Two Champion

Ian Williams (4 August 1931 – 18 October 2024) was a Welsh motorcycle speedway rider. With no Welsh team to represent, he earned eight international caps for the England national speedway team.

== Speedway career ==
Williams began his career riding for the Port Talbot and District Motor Club on grass at the Swansea Greyhound Stadium on 26 June 1947.

He was a leading speedway rider in the 1950s. He reached the final of the Speedway World Championship in the 1957 Individual Speedway World Championship.

Williams rode in the top tier of British Speedway from 1957 to 1963, riding for Swindon Robins and became the club captain.

=== Individual World Championship ===
- 1957 - (England) London, Wembley Stadium - 14th - 3pts

== Personal life and death ==
Williams' two brothers, Freddie and Eric were also speedway riders, Freddie was a double World champion and acted as Ian's mechanic during the 1957 final. Ian Williams died on 18 October 2024, aged 93.
