= George White (speedway rider) =

British motorcycle speedway rider

- Born: 24 May 1931; Dalston, London, England
- Died: 30 December 2017 (aged 86)
- Nationality: British (English)

Career history
- 1953: Yarmouth Bloaters
- 1954-1961: Swindon Robins

Individual honours
- 1957, 1959: Speedway World Championship finalist

Team honours
- 1957: National League Champion
- 1956: National League Div Two Champion

George Albert White also known as Chalky White (24 May 1931 – 30 December 2017) was a motorcycle speedway rider from England. He earned 19 international caps for the England national speedway team.

== Speedway career ==
White reached the final of the Speedway World Championship on two occasions in the 1957 Individual Speedway World Championship and the 1959 Individual Speedway World Championship.

Initially connected with New Cross Rangers, White signed for Yarmouth Bloaters in 1953. He rode in the top tier of British Speedway, riding after sealing a £150 transfer to Swindon Robins for the 1954 season, and remained with Swindon for the rest of his career.

== World final appearances ==
=== Individual World Championship ===
- 1957 - (England) London, Wembley Stadium - 13th - 4pts
- 1959 - (England) London, Wembley Stadium - 9th - 7pts

=== World Team Cup ===
- 1960* - (Sweden) Gothenburg, Ullevi (with Peter Craven / Ron How / Ken McKinlay / Nigel Boocock) - 2nd - 30pts (6)

* 1960 for England.
