= 2010 Swedish speedway season =

Motorcycle speedway season

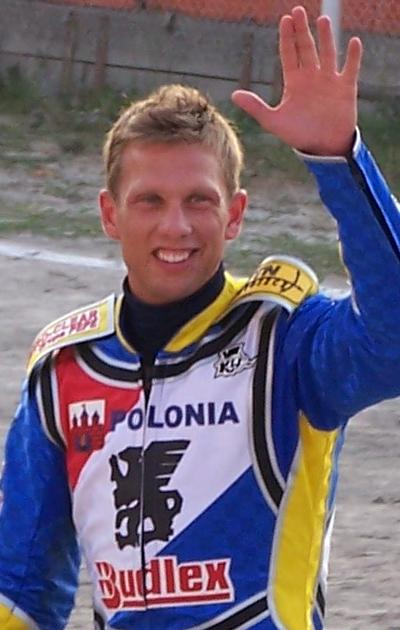
- Andreas Jonsson was the Swedish champion for the fourth time.

The 2010 Swedish speedway season was the 2010 season of motorcycle speedway in Sweden.

== Individual ==
=== Individual Championship ===
The 2010 Swedish Individual Championship final was held at the G&B Arena in Målilla, Kalmar County. The title was won by the defending champion Andreas Jonsson, who beat Freddie Lindgren, Magnus Zetterström and Thomas H. Jonasson in the final heat. The top three riders all rode in the 2010 Speedway Grand Prix.

==== Qualifying round ====
- Malmö (11 August 2010)

Pos.	Rider	Points	Details
1	(1) Mikael Max	15	(3,3,3,3,3)
2	(2) Peter Karlsson	12	(2,2,3,2,3)
3	(8) Eric Andersson	11	(3,2,1,3,2)
4	(11) Sebastian Aldén	11	(3,3,2,1,2)
5	(14) David Ruud	10	(1,3,3,2,1)
6	(13) Daniel Davidsson	8	(3,2,3,0,0)
7	(6) Freddie Eriksson	7+3	(1,1,1,1,3)
8	(4) Linus Sundström	7+2	(1,3,0,0,3)
9	(15) Linus Eklöf	7+1	(2,2,0,2,1)
10	(3) Robin Toernqvist	7+0	(0,1,2,2,2)
11	(5) Dennis Andersson	6	(2,0,1,3,R)
12	(12) Ludvig Lindgren	6	(2,1,2,0,1)
13	(9) Kim Nilsson	5	(0,1,0,3,1)
14	(16) Alexander Edberg	3	(0,0,0,1,2)
15	(7) Simon Gustafsson	3	(0,0,2,1,0)
16	(10) Ricky Kling	2	(1,0,1,R,-)
17	(17) Robin Aspegren	0	(0)
—	(18) Christian Ago	—	—

==== Final ====
- Målilla (18 September 2010)

Placing	Rider	Total	1	2	3	4	5	6	7	8	9	10	11	12	13	14	15	16	17	18	19	20	Pts	Pos	21	22
1	(7) Andreas Jonsson (Dackarna)	13		3					3					3	3					1			13	2		3
2	(2) Fredrik Lindgren (Dackarna)	13	3					2				3				3				2			13	3		2
3	(16) Magnus Zetterström (Indianerna)	14				2				3	3						3			3			14	1		1
4	(5) Thomas H. Jonasson (Nässjö)	10		2			3					2					0					3	10	4	3	0
5	(3) Mikael Max (Örnarna)	9	0						1				3				2				3		9	6	2	
6	(14) Peter Karlsson (Dackarna)	9				1		3					2		1							2	9	7	1	
7	(15) David Ruud (Lejonen)	9				3			2			0						1	3				9	5	0	
8	(4) Eric Andersson (Masarna)	8	2							2				1				2				1	8	8		
9	(10) Antonio Lindbäck (Piraterna)	7			3			1						0			1		2				7	9		
10	(9) Linus Sundström (Piraterna)	7			2		1						1					3		0			7	10		
11	(13) Daniel Nermark (Valsarna)	7				0	2							2		2					1		7	11		
12	(12) Peter Ljung (Vastervik)	7			1					1		1			2						2		7	12		
13	(11) Daniel Davidsson (Vargarna)	3			0				0		2					1						0	3	13		
14	(1) Robin Toernqvist (Solkatterna)	2	1				0				1				0				0				2	14		
15	(6) Freddie Eriksson (Griparna)	1		1				0			0							0			0		1	15		
16	(8) Linus Eklöf (Hammarby)	1		0						0			0			0			1				1	16		
	(17) Dennis Andersson (Lejonen)	0																					0			
	(18) Ludvig Lindgren (Dackarna)	0																					0			
Placing	Rider	Total	1	2	3	4	5	6	7	8	9	10	11	12	13	14	15	16	17	18	19	20	Pts	Pos	21	22

m - exclusion for exceeding two minute time allowance • t - exclusion for touching the tapes • x - other exclusion • e - retired or mechanical failure • f - fell • ns - non-starter • nc - non-classify

gate A - inside	gate B	gate C	gate D - outside

=== U21 Championship ===
The Under-21 Championship was held one day before the senior Final and was won by Dennis Andersson. Andersson beat Linus Eklöf, Linus Sundström and Simon Gustafsson in the final heat. Andersson also won the 2010 Individual Speedway Junior European Championship.

==== Qualifying round ====
- Nyköping (21 August 2010)

Pos.	Rider	Points	Details
1	(1) Anton Rosén	14	(3,3,3,3,2)
2	(3) Linus Eklöf	13	(2,3,3,2,3)
3	(15) Jonas Messing	12	(3,2,3,1,3)
4	(7) Oliver Berntzon	9	(2,0,3,1,3)
5	(13) Andreas Westlund	9	(0,2,2,3,2)
6	(8) Sebastian Carlson	9	(1,3,2,2,1)
7	(11) Victor Palovaara	8+3	(3,1,X,1,3)
8	(16) Joel Larsson	8+2	(1,1,1,3,2)
9	(5) Jacob Thorssell	8+1	(3,1,1,1,2)
10	(14) Andre Hertzberg	7	(2,3,X,2,X)
11	(6) Anders Mellgren	6	(0,R,2,3,1)
12	(2) Christian Ago	5	(1,2,2,X,X)
13	(4) Tim Gudmundsson	5	(0,2,1,2,X)
14	(12) Daniel Henderson	2	(2,0,0,X,-)
15	(10) Mathias Thornblom	2	(1,1,0,0,0)
16	(9) Henrik Karlsson	1	(0,0,1,R,-)

==== Final ====
Målilla (17 September 2010)

Placing	Rider	Total	1	2	3	4	5	6	7	8	9	10	11	12	13	14	15	16	17	18	19	20	Pts	Pos	21	22
1	(1) Dennis Andersson (Lejonen)	14	2				3				3				3				3				14	1		3
2	(4) Linus Eklöf (Hammarby)	12	3							2				3				1				3	12	3		2
3	(7) Linus Sundström (Piraterna)	11		3					3					1	2					2			11	4	3	1
4	(9) Simon Gustafsson (Indianerna)	13			3		1						3					3		3			13	2		0
5	(5) Ludvig Lindgren (Dackarna)	9		2			0					3					3					1	9	6	2	
6	(13) Robin Aspegren (Nässjö)	10				3	2							2		R					3		10	5	1	
7	(16) Kim Nilsson (Griparna)	9				2				3	2						2			0			9	7	X	
8	(6) Anton Rosén (Rospiggarna)	9		1				3			1							2			2		9	8		
9	(2) Joel Larsson (Dackarna)	8	1					2				2				2				1			8	9		
10	(3) Jonas Messing (Vetlanda)	6	0						2				2				1				1		6	10		
11	(8) Victor Palovaara (Solkatterna)	5		0						1			0			3			1				5	11		
12	(15) Alexander Edberg (Hammarby)	5				1			1			1						0	2				5	12		
13	(14) Andreas Westlund (Masarna)	3				0		1					1		1							0	3	13		
14	(10) Jacob Thorssell (Vetlanda)	2			2			R						0			0		0				2	14		
15	(17) Andre Hertzberg (Vargarna)	2																				2	2	15		
16	(11) Sebastian Carlsson (Griparna)	1			1				0		0					F						-	1	16		
17	(12) Oliver Berntzon (Örnarna)	0			0					0		R			0						0		0	17		
	(18) Christian Ago (Örnarna)	0																					0			
Placing	Rider	Total	1	2	3	4	5	6	7	8	9	10	11	12	13	14	15	16	17	18	19	20	Pts	Pos	21	22

m - exclusion for exceeding two minute time allowance • t - exclusion for touching the tapes • x - other exclusion • e - retired or mechanical failure • f - fell • ns - non-starter • nc - non-classify

gate A - inside	gate B	gate C	gate D - outside

== Team ==
=== Team Championship ===
Vetlanda won the Elitserien.

Hammarby won the Allsvenskan (second-tier league).

Elitserien
Pos	Team	Pts
1	Dackarna	34
2	Vetlanda	33
3	Piraterna	29
4	Lejonen	22
5	Indianerna	19
6	Västervik	19
7	Vargarna	18
8	Valsarna	4
9	Rospiggarna	2

Allsvenskan
Pos	Team	Pts
1	Örnarna	23
2	Hammarby	22
3	Masarna	18
4	Griparna	17
5	Solkatterna	0

Play offs

Elitserien
Stage	Team	Team	Agg Score
SF	Vetlanda	Dackarna	100:92
SF	Lejonen	Piraterna	102:90
Final	Vetlanda	Lejonen	106:86

Allsvenskan
Stage	Team	Team	Agg Score
SF	Hammarby	Griparna	102:90
SF	Ornarna	Masarna	112:80
Final	Hammarby	Ornarna	106:86

Division 1
Pos	Team	Pts
1	Smederna	32
2	Filbyterna	26
3	Malilla	25
4	Gnistorna	22
5	Nassjo	20
6	Gasarna	16
7	Hagfors	12
8	Indianerna Juniors	12
9	Stjarnorna Hallstavik	10
10	Eldarna	5
