= 1976 Swedish speedway season =

Motorcycle racing competition

The 1976 Swedish speedway season was the 1976 season of motorcycle speedway in Sweden.

== Individual ==
=== Individual Championship ===
The 1976 Swedish Individual Speedway Championship final was held on 24 September in Vetlanda. Anders Michanek won the Swedish Championship for the third time.

Pos.	Rider	Club	Total
1	Anders Michanek	Getingarna	15
2	Bernt Persson	Indianerna	14
3	Christer Löfqvist	Njudungarna	12
4	Tommy Nilsson	Getingarna	11
5	Jan Andersson	Kaparna	11
6	Bo Wirebrand	Njudungarna	10
7	Lars-Åke Andersson	Njudungarna	9
8	Karl-Erik Claesson	Örnarna	6
9	Richard Hellsén	Getingarna	6
10	Willy Karlsson	Njudungarna	6
11	Stefan Salmonsson	Smederna	5
12	Bengt Jansson	Smederna	5
13	Sören Karlsson	Vargarna	4
14	Therje Henriksson	Lejonen	4
15	Sven Nilsson	Bysarna	2
16	Kenneth Selmosson	Kaparna	0

=== Junior Championship ===
Winner - Jan Davidsson

== Team ==
=== Team Championship ===
Njudungarna won division 1 and were declared the winners of the Swedish Speedway Team Championship for the first time. The Njudungarna team included Lars-Åke Andersson, Christer Löfqvist, Conny Samuelsson and Bo Wirebrand.

Örnarna won the second division, while Eldarna and Solkatterna won the third division north and south respectively.

Div 1
Pos	Team	Pts
1	Njudungarna	24
2	Indianerna	18
3	Getingarna	17
4	Smederna	14
5	Dackarna	14
6	Bysarna	13
7	Vargarna	8
8	Lejonen	4

Div 2
Pos	Team	Pts
1	Örnarna	21
2	Piraterna	18
3	Kaparna	15
4	Filbyterna	11
5	Masarna	10
6	Skepparna	5
7	Valsarna	4

Div 3 north
Pos	Team	Pts
1	Eldarna	22
2	Lindarna	17
3	Gamarna	13
4	Jämtarna	6
5	Stjärnorna	2

Div 3 south
Pos	Team	Pts
1	Solkatterna	22
2	Vikingarna	15
3	Pilarna	9
4	Hjälmarna	8
5	Brassarna	6

== See also ==
- Speedway in Sweden
