= 2012 Swedish speedway season =

Motorcycle racing competition

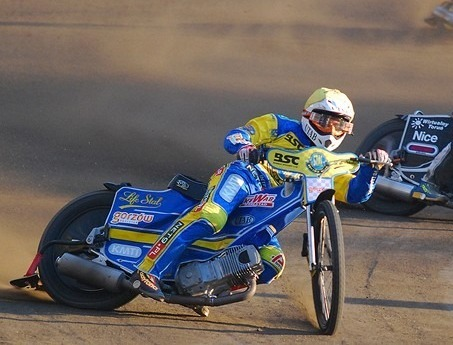
- Daniel Nermark won the Swedish Championship

The 2012 Swedish speedway season was the 2012 season of motorcycle speedway in Sweden.

== Individual ==
=== Individual Championship ===
The 2012 Swedish Individual Speedway Championship final was held in Vetlanda on 6 June. Daniel Nermark won the Swedish Championship.

| Pos | Rider | Team | Pts | Total | SF | Final |
|---|---|---|---|---|---|---|
| 1 | Daniel Nermark | Valsarna | (2,3,3,2,2) | 12 | | 3 |
| 2 | Andreas Jonsson | Dackarna | (3,2,3,3,3) | 14 | | 2 |
| 3 | Thomas H. Jonasson | Vetlanda | (3,2,2,0,2) | 9 | 3 | 1 |
| 4 | Magnus Zetterström | Hammarby | (3,3,3,1,3) | 13 | | 0 |
| 5 | Peter Karlsson | Vargarna | (0,2,1,3,3) | 9 | 2 | |
| 6 | Mikael Max | Gnistorna | (2,2,3,3,1) | 11 | 1 | |
| 7 | Peter Ljung | Vastervik | (2,3,2,3,2) | 12 | 0 | |
| 8 | Ricky Kling | Smederna | (1,3,2,2,0) | 8 | | |
| 9 | Freddie Lindgren | Dackarna | (2,1,0,2,2) | 7 | | |
| 10 | Jonas Davidsson | Dackarna | (3,0,2,0,1) | 6 | | |
| 11 | Dennis Anderson | Hammarby | (0,1,1,1,3) | 6 | | |
| 12 | Sebastian Aldén | Masarna | (1,0,1,1,1) | 4 | | |
| 13 | Daniel Davidsson | Griparna | (0,0,1,2,0) | 3 | | |
| 14 | Robin Aspegren | Dackarna | (1,1,0,1,0) | 3 | | |
| 15 | Linus Sundström | Piraterna | (1,1,0,0,1) | 3 | | |
| 16 | Eric Andersson | Masarna | (0,0,0,0,r) | 0 | | |

Key

- points per race - 3 for a heat win, 2 for 2nd, 1 for third, 0 for last
- r - retired

=== U21 Championship ===
Dennis Andersson won the U21 championship.

== Team ==
=== Team Championship ===
Vetlanda won the Elitserien and were declared the winners of the Swedish Speedway Team Championship for the sixth time.

Smederna won the Allsvenskan.

Elitserien
| Pos | Team | Pts |
|---|---|---|
| 1 | Vetlanda | 29 |
| 2 | Piraterna | 24 |
| 3 | Dackarna | 23 |
| 4 | Indianerna | 16 |
| 5 | Hammarby | 15 |
| 6 | Västervik | 12 |
| 7 | Valsarna | 11 |
| 8 | Vargarna | 10 |

Allsvenskan
| Pos | Team | Pts |
|---|---|---|
| 1 | Rospiggarna | 27 |
| 2 | Smederna | 22 |
| 3 | Masarna | 21 |
| 4 | Griparna | 13 |
| 5 | Örnarna | 14 |
| 6 | Gnistorna | 9 |

Play offs

Elitserien
| Stage | Team | Team | Agg Score |
|---|---|---|---|
| QF | Dackarna | Vastervik | 100:80 |
| QF | Indianerna | Hammarby | 100:80 |
| SF | Vetlanda | Indianerna | 98:82 |
| SF | Piraterna | Dackarna | 97:83 |
| Final | Vetlanda | Piraterna | 96:83 |

Allsvenskan
| Stage | Team | Team | Agg Score |
|---|---|---|---|
| SF | Smederna | Masarna | 101:79 |
| SF | Rospiggarna | Griparna | 118:62 |
| Final | Smederna | Rospiggarna | 93:87 |

Division 1
| Pos | Team | Pts |
|---|---|---|
| 1 | Smederna B | 27 |
| 2 | Lejonen | 25 |
| 3 | Mallila | 21 |
| 4 | Solkatterna | 20 |
| 5 | Gasarna | 16 |
| 6 | Indianerna Juniors | 13 |
| 7 | Crossbone Pirates | 12 |
| 8 | Nassjo | 8 |
| 9 | Gnistorna B | 2 |
