= 1981 Swedish speedway season =

Motorcycle racing competition

The 1981 Swedish speedway season was the 1981 season of motorcycle speedway in Sweden.

== Individual ==
=== Individual Championship ===
The 1981 Swedish Individual Speedway Championship final was held on 11 September in Vetlanda. Jan Andersson won the Swedish Championship for the third time.

| Pos. | Rider | Club | Total |
|---|---|---|---|
| 1 | Jan Andersson | Kaparna | 15 |
| 2 | Hans Danielsson | Lejonen | 13 |
| 3 | Tommy Nilsson | Getingarna | 11+3 |
| 4 | Björn Andersson | Kaparna | 11+2 |
| 5 | Anders Michanek | Getingarna | 11+1 |
| 6 | Richard Hellsén | Getingarna | 10 |
| 7 | Anders Eriksson | Lejonen | 8 |
| 8 | Conny Samuelsson | Njudungarna | 8 |
| 9 | Bernt Persson | Smederna | 7 |
| 10 | Ulf Blomqvist | Njudungarna | 5 |
| 11 | Roger Gustavsson | Njudungarna | 4 |
| 12 | Bo Wirebrand | Njudungarna | 4 |
| 13 | Lennart Bengtsson | Smederna | 4 |
| 14 | Sören Karlsson | Indianerna | 4 |
| 15 | Thomas Hydling | Getingarna | 4 |
| 16 | Börje Klingberg | Örnarna | 1 |

=== Junior Championship ===
Winner - Anders Kling

== Team ==
=== Team Championship ===
Getingarna won division 1 and were declared the winners of the Swedish Speedway Team Championship for the 11th time in their history. The Getingarna team included Tommy Nilsson, Anders Michanek and Richard Hellsén.

Solkatterna and Vargarna won the second division north and south, while Brassarna won the third division.

Div 1
| Pos | Team | Pts |
|---|---|---|
| 1 | Getingarna | 22 |
| 2 | Njudungarna | 20 |
| 3 | Lejonen | 18 |
| 4 | Örnarna | 16 |
| 5 | Smederna | 12 |
| 6 | Indianerna | 11 |
| 7 | Skepparna | 8 |
| 8 | Kaparna | 5 |

Div 2 north
| Pos | Team | Pts |
|---|---|---|
| 1 | Solkatterna | 20 |
| 2 | Gamarna | 15 |
| 3 | Eldarna | 10 |
| 4 | Rospiggarna | 8 |
| 5 | Masarna | 6 |
| 6 | Pilarna | 1 |

Div 2 south
| Pos | Team | Pts |
|---|---|---|
| 1 | Vargarna | 16 |
| 2 | Dackarna | 14 |
| 3 | Piraterna | 10 |
| 4 | Bysarna | 10 |
| 5 | Filbyterna | 8 |
| 6 | Gnistorna | 2 |

Div 3
| Pos | Team | Pts |
|---|---|---|
| 1 | Brassarna | 24 |
| 2 | Vikingarna | 11 |
| 3 | Lindarna | 11 |
| 4 | Valsarna | 2 |

== See also ==
- Speedway in Sweden
