= 2003 Swedish speedway season =

Motorcycle racing competition

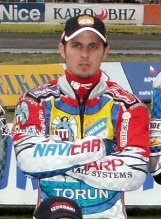
- Australian Ryan Sullivan was instrumental in helping Kaparna win the Elitserien.

The 2003 Swedish speedway season was the 2003 season of motorcycle speedway in Sweden.

== Individual ==
=== Individual Championship ===
The 2003 Swedish Individual Speedway Championship final was held in Hagfors on 2 August. Stefan Dannö won the Swedish Championship. The final was held under the format whereby there was preliminary event, main event, semi final and final.

Pos	Rider	Team	Pts	SF	Final
1	Stefan Dannö	Valsarna	(3,2,3,3)	3	3
2	Stefan Andersson	Luxo Stars	(2,3,3,2)	3	2
3	Mikael Max	Luxo Stars	(3,2)	2	1
4	Peter Karlsson	Kaparna	(3,0,2)	2	0
5	Freddie Eriksson	Rospiggarna	(2,1,2,1,2,2)	1	x
5	Freddie Lindgren	Piraterna	(3,2,1)	1	x
7	Antonio Lindbäck	Gasarna	(3,3,1,3,3)	0	x
7	Andreas Jonsson	Rospiggarna	(2,1,3,w)	0	x
9	Magnus Zetterström	Smederna	(1,3,3,0,2,1)	x	x
9	Peter Ljung	Luxo Stars	(3,2,2,0,1)	x	x
11	Daniel Nermark	Vargarna	(0,2,2,2,1,u)	x	x
11	Robert Johansson	Västervik	(2,0,1,1,3,0)	x	x
13	Henrik Gustafsson	Indianerna	(3,3,0,1)	x	x
13	Mattias Nilsson	VMS Elit	(2,0,1,0,1)	x	x
15	Tobias Johansson	Luxo Stars	(0,u)	x	x
15	Bjorn Gustavsson	VMS Elit	(1,3,3,1,u)	x	x
17	Peter Ingvar Karlsson	Valsarna	(2,1,0)	x	x
16	Magnus Karlsson	Kaparna	(0,2,0)	x	x
19	Emil Kramer	Örnarna	(0,1)	x	x
19	Jonas Davidsson	Rospiggarna	(1,1)	x	x
21	Rickard Sedelius	Team Bikab	(1,0)	x	x

Key

- points per race - 3 for a heat win, 2 for 2nd, 1 for third, 0 for last
- ef - engine failure
- t - tape touching excluded
- u - fell
- w - excluded

=== U21 Championship ===
Freddie Lindgren won the U21 championship.

== Team ==
=== Team Championship ===
Kaparna won the Elitserien and were declared the winners of the Swedish Speedway Team Championship for the third time. The Kaparna team included Ryan Sullivan, Jaroslaw Hampel, Joonas Kylmäkorpi and Peter Karlsson.

Vetlanda became VMS Elit.

Piraterna won the Allsvenskan.

Elitserien
Pos	Team	Pts
1	Smederna	39
2	Kaparna	36
3	Masarna	30
4	Luxo Stars	24
5	VMS Elit	22
6	Vargarna	22
7	Västervik	19
8	Indianerna	14
9	Rospiggarna	12
10	Valsarna	6

Allsvenskan
Pos	Team	Pts
1	Piraterna	19
2	Bysarna	12
3	Gasarna	12
4	Örnarna	6
5	Lejonen	6
6	Team Bikab	5

Play offs

Elitserien
Stage	Team	Team	Agg Score
SF	Kaparna	Masarna	98:94
Final	Kaparna	Smederna	101:91

Division 1
Pos	Team	Pts
1	Eldarna	24
2	Griparna	28
3	Skepparna	16
4	Gastarna	16
5	Dackarna	12
6	Korpana	12
7	Kavaljererna	10
8	Nässjö	4

Division 2
Pos	Team	Pts
1	Filbyterna	24
2	Getingarna	21
3	Solkatterna	19
4	Lindarna	14
5	Vikingarna	11

== See also ==
- Speedway in Sweden
