= 2005 Swedish speedway season =

Motorcycle racing competition

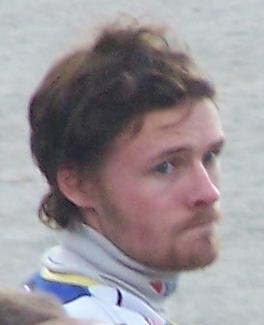
- Jonas Davidsson, 2005 U21 champion.

The 2005 Swedish speedway season was the 2005 season of motorcycle speedway in Sweden.

== Individual ==
=== Individual Championship ===
The 2005 Swedish Individual Speedway Championship final was held in Vetlanda on 2 July. Tony Rickardsson won the Swedish Championship for the eighth time, which brought his total to just one behind the nine achieved by Ove Fundin during his career.

Pos	Rider	Team	Pts	Total	SF	Final
1	Tony Rickardsson	Masarna	(3,3,3,3,3)	15	x	3
2	Peter Karlsson	Luxo Stars	(3,3,r,3,2)	11	x	2
3	Mikael Max	Luxo Stars	(3,2,3,3,2)	13	x	1
4	Magnus Zetterström	Indianerna	(2,0,2,3,3)	10	3	0
5	Freddie Lindgren	Masarna	(2,3,3,r,0)	8	2	x
6	Peter Ljung	Västervik	(0,3,3,1,1)	8	1	x
7	Niklas Klingberg	Vargarna	(2,2,2,2,2)	10	0	x
8	Antonio Lindbäck	Masarna	(2,0,2,0,3)	7	x	x
9	Andreas Messing	Getingarna	(3,1,2,f,1)	7	x	x
9	Jonas Davidsson	Rospiggarna	(1,1,1,1,3)	7	x	x
11	Stefan Dannö	Valsarna	(1,2,1,2,r)	6	x	x
11	Magnus Karlsson	Masarna	(1,1,1,2,1)	6	x	x
13	Andreas Bergstrom	Vargarna	(0,0,1,1,2)	4	x	x
14	Emil Kramer	Örnarna	(0,1,f,1,1)	3	x	x
14	Sebastian Aldén (res)	Masarna	(1,0,2,0)	3	x	x
16	Tobias Johansson	Valsarna	(r,2,0,0,r)	2	x	x
17	Henrik Gustafsson	Indianerna	(t,r,f,-,-)	0	x	x

Key

- points per race - 3 for a heat win, 2 for 2nd, 1 for third, 0 for last
- ef - engine failure
- r - retired
- t - tape touching excluded
- f - fell

=== U21 Championship ===
Jonas Davidsson won the U21 championship.

== Team ==
=== Team Championship ===
Västervik won the Elitserien and were declared the winners of the Swedish Speedway Team Championship for the first time in their history. The Västervik team included Tomasz Gollob, Jacek Gollob, Bjarne Pedersen and Niels Kristian Iversen.

Bajen Speedway, Stockholm won the Allsvenskan.

Elitserien
Pos	Team	Pts
1	Västervik	35
2	Vetlanda	32
3	Luxo Stars	30
4	Smederna	28
5	Masarna	28
6	Rospiggarna	21
7	Piraterna	20
8	Indianerna	11
9	Vargarna	11
10	Kaparna	9

Allsvenskan
Pos	Team	Pts
1	Bajen Speedway	30
2	Lejonen	25
3	Valsarna	20
4	Getingarna	14
5	Griparna	14
6	Masarna	12
7	Örnarna	12
8	Bysarna	11
9	Eldarna	6

Play offs

Elitserien
Stage	Team	Team	Agg Score
SF	Vastervik	Luxo Stars	109:83
SF	Vetlanda	Smederna	103:89
Final	Vastervik	Vetlanda	99:93

Division 1
Pos	Team	Pts
1	Team Bikab	20
2	Nässjö	16
3	Solkatterna	10
4	Vikingarna	10
5	Filbyterna	4
6	Gastarna	0
