= 1979 Swedish speedway season =

Motorcycle racing competition

The 1979 Swedish speedway season was the 1979 season of motorcycle speedway in Sweden.

== Individual ==
=== Individual Championship ===
The 1979 Swedish Individual Speedway Championship final was held on 25 August in Kumla. Jan Andersson won the Swedish Championship.

Pos.	Rider	Club	Total
1	Jan Andersson	Kaparna	15
2	Lillebror Johansson	Indianerna	14
3	Bernt Persson	Smederna	13
4	Börje Klingberg	Örnarna	12
5	Hans Holmqvist	Indianerna	10
6	Anders Michanek	Getingarna	9
7	Lars-Åke Andersson	Njudungarna	9
8	Richard Hellsén	Getingarna	8
9	Bengt Gustavsson	Lejonen	6
10	Åke Axelsson	Piraterna	4
11	Stefan Salmonsson	Lejonen	4
12	Rolf Sundberg	Vargarna	4
13	Uno Johansson	Njudungarna	4
14	Tommy Johansson	Dackarna	3
15	Tommy Nilsson	Getingarna	3
16	Alf Trofast (res)	Lejonen	2
17	Bengt Jansson	Skepparna	0
18	Christer Sjösten (res)	Bysarna	0
19	Peter Johansson (res)	Dackarna	0

=== Junior Championship ===
Winner - Lars Rosberg

== Team ==
=== Team Championship ===
Getingarna won division 1 and were declared the winners of the Swedish Speedway Team Championship for the tenth time. The team included Richard Hellsén, Anders Michanek and Tommy Nilsson.

Skepparna won the second division, while Eldarna and Solkatterna won the third division east and west respectively.

Div 1
Pos	Team	Pts
1	Getingarna	24
2	Njudungarna	20
3	Örnarna	17
4	Vargarna	14
5	Lejonen	13
6	Indianerna	11
7	Smederna	11
8	Dackarna	2

Div 2
Pos	Team	Pts
1	Skepparna	24
2	Kaparna	18
3	Masarna	14
4	Piraterna	14
5	Bysarna	6
6	Filbyterna	2
7	Gamarna	2

Div 3 east
Pos	Team	Pts
1	Eldarna	23
2	Rospiggarna	17
3	Vikingarna	5
4	Lindarna	3

Div 3 west
Pos	Team	Pts
1	Solkatterna	20
2	Gnistorna	15
3	Brassarna	14
4	Pilarna	10
5	Korparna	1

== See also ==
- Speedway in Sweden
