= 1985 Swedish speedway season =

Motorcycle racing competition

The 1985 Swedish speedway season was the 1985 season of motorcycle speedway in Sweden.

== Individual ==
=== Individual Championship ===
The 1985 Swedish Individual Speedway Championship final was held on 7 September in Målilla. Erik Stenlund won the Swedish Championship.

Pos	Rider	Team	Pts	Total
1	Erik Stenlund	Getingarna	(3,2,2,3,2)	12
2	Tommy Nilsson	Getingarna	(1,1,3,3,3)	11
3	Jan Andersson	Kaparna	(1,3,3,2,2)	11
4	Jimmy Nilsen	Getingarna	(1,3,3,3,1)	11
5	Conny Ivarsson	Njudungarna	(2,3,3,3,u)	11
6	Patrick Karlsson	Vargarna	(3,3,u,2,3)	11
7	Bengt Jansson	Rospiggarna	(3,1,2,2,2)	10
8	Kenneth Nystrom	Örnarna	(3,2,2,1,1)	9
9	Pierre Brannefors	Kaparna	(2,2,1,0,2)	7
10	Peter Nahlin	Getingarna	(2,u,1,d,3)	6
11	Christer Johnson	Dackarna	(d,2,1,d,1)	4
12	Thomas Ek	Njudungarna	(2,1,1,d,0)	4
13	Lillebror Johansson	Solkatterna	(0,0,2,1,0)	3
14	Mikael Teurnberg	Rospiggarna	(1,d,0,1,1)	3
15	Roger Sundberg (res)	Bysarna	(3)	3
16	Peder Messing	Rospiggarna	(d,d,u,2,d)	2
17	Mikael Blixt	Vargarna	(d,1,d,d)	1

=== U21 Championship ===
Winner - Mikael Blixt

== Team ==
=== Team Championship ===
Getingarna won the Elitserien and were declared the winners of the Swedish Speedway Team Championship for the 13th time. The Getingarna team included Tommy Nilsson, Per Jonsson and Erik Stenlund.

Bysarna won the first division, while Tuna Rebels and Piraterna won the second division north and south respectively.

Elitserien
Pos	Team	Pts
1	Getingarna	26
2	Njudungarna	15
3	Kaparna	15
4	Vargarna	15
5	Indianerna	12
6	Solkatterna	10
7	Örnarna	10
8	Gamarna	7

Div 1
Pos	Team	Pts
1	Bysarna	26
2	Dackarna	20
3	Smederna	20
4	Rospiggarna	17
5	Lejonen	17
6	Filbyterna	8
7	Brassarna	2
8	Vikingarna	2

Div 2 north
Pos	Team	Pts
1	Tuna Rebels	21
2	Valsarna	18
3	Lindarna	15
4	Gävle	11
5	Griparna	9
6	Masarna	6
7	Eldarna	4

Div 2 south
Pos	Team	Pts
1	Piraterna	21
2	Skepparna	19
3	Korparna	13
4	Gnistorna	6
5	Pilarna	1

== See also ==
- Speedway in Sweden
