= 2004 Swedish speedway season =

Motorcycle speedway season in Sweden

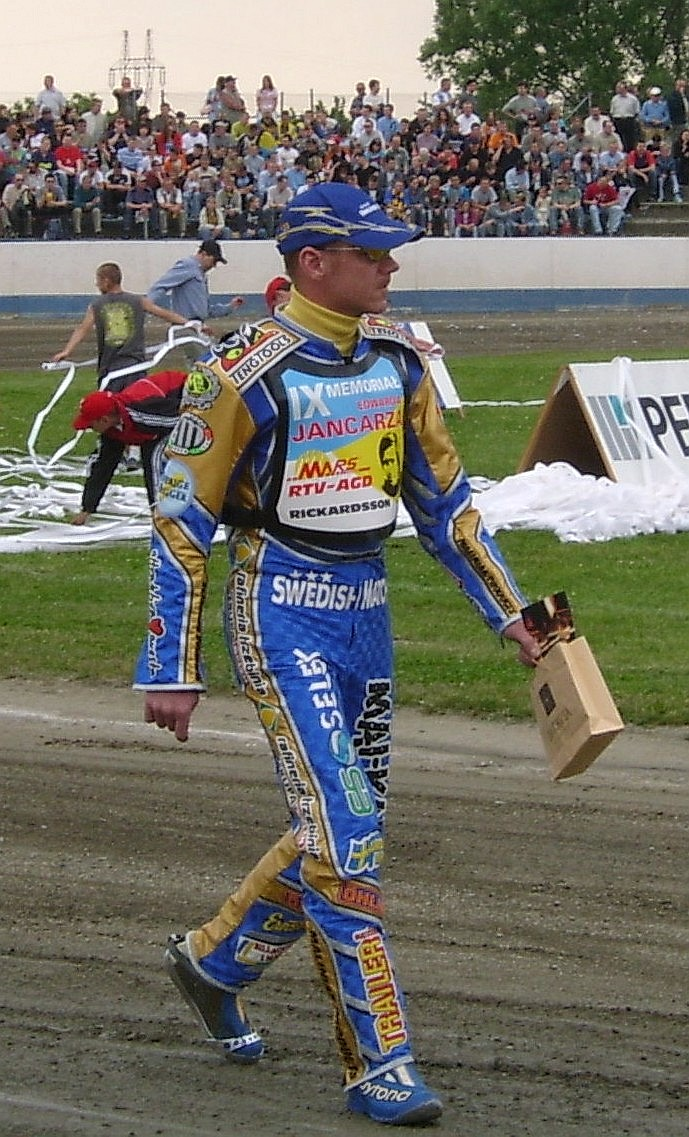
- Tony Rickardsson won his seventh Swedish national title.

The 2004 Swedish speedway season was the 2004 season of motorcycle speedway in Sweden.

== Individual ==
=== Individual Championship ===
The 2004 Swedish Individual Speedway Championship final was held in Målilla on 3 July. Tony Rickardsson won the Swedish Championship for the seventh time. The final was held under the format whereby there was preliminary event, main event, semi final and final.

Pos	Rider	Team	Pts	SF	Final
1	Tony Rickardsson	Masarna	(3,3)	3	3
2	Antonio Lindbäck	Masarna	(3,3,3,3)	3	2
3	Mikael Max	Luxo Stars	(3,2)	2	1
4	Andreas Jonsson	Rospiggarna	(3,2)	2	0
5	Peter Karlsson	Luxo Stars	(2,1,3)	1	x
5	Magnus Zetterström	Västervik	(2,3,2,1,3)	1	x
7	Niklas Klingberg	Piraterna	(3,2,2,0,2,0)	0	x
7	Stefan Dannö	Indianerna	(0,3,2,0)	0	x
9	Peter Ljung	Luxo Stars	(0,2,1)	x	x
9	David Ruud	VMS Elit	(3,1,3,1,3,1)	x	x
11	Sebastian Aldén	Masarna	(3,0,2,2,0,0)	x	x
11	Magnus Karlsson	Masarna	(1,3,1,1,2,0)	x	x
13	Tobias Johansson	Lejonen	(2,0,2,0,1)	x	x
13	Freddie Lindgren	Masarna	(2,2,0,1)	x	x
15	Jonas Davidsson	Rospiggarna	(2,2,3,1)	x	x
15	Stefan Andersson	Piraterna	(1,3,1,1,0)	x	x
17	Peter Nahlin	Smederna	(1,2,0)	x	x
17	Kim Jansson	Kaparna	(0,2,0)	x	x
19	Stefan Ekberg	Ornarna	(0,1)	x	x
19	Eric Andersson	Eldarna	(0,1)	x	x
21	Rickard Sedelius	Smederna	(0)	x	x
21	Thomas Ljung	Luxo Stars	(0,0)	x	x

Key

- points per race - 3 for a heat win, 2 for 2nd, 1 for third, 0 for last

=== U21 Championship ===
Freddie Lindgren won the U21 championship for the second successive year.

== Team ==
=== Team Championship ===
VMS Elit won the Elitserien and were declared the winners of the Swedish Speedway Team Championship for the third time. The Vetlanda team included Rune Holta, Wiesław Jaguś, Aleš Dryml Jr. and Claes Ivarsson.

Örnarna won the Allsvenskan after winning the play offs.

Elitserien
Pos	Team	Pts
1	Masarna	35
2	Luxo Stars	34
3	Kaparna	32
4	VMS Elit	31
5	Smederna	27
6	Rospiggarna	27
7	Västervik	24
8	Indianerna	7
9	Vargarna	5
10	Piraterna	3

Allsvenskan
Pos	Team	Pts
1	Team Dalakraft	18
2	Lejonen	16
3	Örnarna	15
4	Bajen Speedway	14
5	Valsarna	13
6	Bysarna	4
7	Eldarna	4

Play offs

Elitserien
Stage	Team	Team	Agg Score
SF	Masarna	Kaparna	117:75
SF	Vetlanda	Luxo Stars	112:80
Final	Vetlanda	Masarna	98:94

Division 1
Pos	Team	Pts
1	Skepparna	22
2	Griparna	18
3	Team Bikab	14
4	Gastarna	14
5	Getingarna	12
6	Vikingarna	4
7	Nässjö	0
