= 1978 Swedish speedway season =

Motorcycle racing competition

The 1978 Swedish speedway season was the 1978 season of motorcycle speedway in Sweden.

== Individual ==
=== Individual Championship ===
The 1978 Swedish Individual Speedway Championship final was held on 26 August at the Snälltorpet in Eskilstuna. Anders Michanek won the Swedish Championship for the fourth time.

Pos.	Rider	Club	Total
1	Anders Michanek	Getingarna	15
2	Bengt Jansson	Smederna	13
3	Bernt Persson	Smederna	12+3
4	Jan Andersson	Kaparna	12+2
5	Bo Wirebrand	Njudungarna	10
6	Tommy Nilsson	Getingarna	9
7	Hans Holmqvist	Indianerna	8
8	Gert Carlsson	Smederna	8
9	Börje Klingberg	Örnarna	7
10	Karl-Erik Claesson	Örnarna	6
11	Hans Danielsson	Lejonen	6
12	Richard Hellsén	Getingarna	5
13	Uno Johansson	Njudungarna	4
14	Åke Fridell	Indianerna	4
15	Lars-Inge Hultberg	Gamarna	1
16	Per-Åke Gerhardsson	Indianerna	0
17	Lars Ericsson	Indianerna	0
18	Christer Sjösten (res)	Bysarna	0

=== Junior Championship ===
Winner - Lennart Bengtsson

== Team ==
=== Team Championship ===
Getingarna won division 1 and were declared the winners of the Swedish Speedway Team Championship for the ninth time. The team included the riders Anders Michanek, Tommy Nilsson and Richard Hellsén.

The team name for Stjärnorna (The Stars) was changed to Rospiggarna.

Lejonen won the second division, while Pilarna and Filbyterna won the third division north and south respectively.

Div 1
Pos	Team	Pts
1	Getingarna	24
2	Njudungarna	24
3	Smederna	22
4	Indianerna	13
5	Örnarna	9
6	Vargarna	9
7	Dackarna	8
8	Skepparna	3

Div 2
Pos	Team	Pts
1	Lejonen	21
2	Kaparna	18
3	Masarna	13
4	Piraterna	12
5	Bysarna	9
6	Gamarna	8
7	Eldarna	3

Div 3 north
Pos	Team	Pts
1	Pilarna	17
2	Solkatterna	16
3	Vikingarna	12
4	Rospiggarna	11
5	Lindarna	4

Div 3 south
Pos	Team	Pts
1	Filbyterna	24
2	Brassarna	18
3	Gnistorna	7
4	Hjälmarna	6
5	Korparna	5

== See also ==
- Speedway in Sweden
