= 1980 Swedish speedway season =

Motorcycle racing competition

The 1980 Swedish speedway season was the 1980 season of motorcycle speedway in Sweden.

== Individual ==
=== Individual Championship ===
The 1980 Swedish Individual Speedway Championship final was held on 23 August in Eskilstuna. Jan Andersson won the Swedish Championship for the second time.

Pos.	Rider	Club	Total
1	Jan Andersson	Kaparna	13+3
2	Börje Klingberg	Örnarna	13+2
3	Hans Danielsson	Lejonen	12
4	Bo Wirebrand	Njudungarna	11
5	Bernt Persson	Smederna	11
6	Conny Samuelsson	Njudungarna	10
7	Tommy Nilsson	Getingarna	10
8	Stefan Salmonsson	Lejonen	9
9	Gert Carlsson	Smederna	6
10	Lillebror Johansson	Indianerna	6
11	Karl-Erik Claesson	Örnarna	4
12	Bengt Jansson	Skepparna	4
13	Lars Rosberg	Lejonen	4
14	Börje Ring	Vargarna	3
15	Peter Johansson	Piraterna	1
16	Rolf Sundberg	Vargarna	1
17	Richard Hellsén	Getingarna	1

=== Junior Championship ===
Winner - Pierre Brannefors

== Team ==
=== Team Championship ===
Njudungarna finished top of division 1 but Getingarna beat them 83-73 in the play-off final and thus Getingarna were declared the winners of the Swedish Speedway Team Championship.

Piraterna and Kaparna won the second division north and south respectively, while Pilarna won the third division.

Div 1
Pos	Team	Pts
1	Njudungarna	24
2	Getingarna	22
3	Lejonen	16
4	Skepparna	16
5	Indianerna	14
6	Örnarna	10
7	Smederna	6
8	Vargarna	4

Div 2 south
Pos	Team	Pts
1	Kaparna	19
2	Solkatterna	15
3	Dackarna	12
4	Gnistorna	6
5	Filbyterna	6
6	Brassarna	2

Div 2 north
Pos	Team	Pts
1	Piraterna	20
2	Gamarna	14
3	Bysarna	13
4	Masarna	5
5	Eldarna	4
6	Rospiggarna	4

Div 3
Pos	Team	Pts
1	Pilarna	20
2	Vikingarna	15
3	Lindarna	10
4	Korparna	3

== See also ==
- Speedway in Sweden
