= 1974 Swedish speedway season =

Motorcycle racing competition

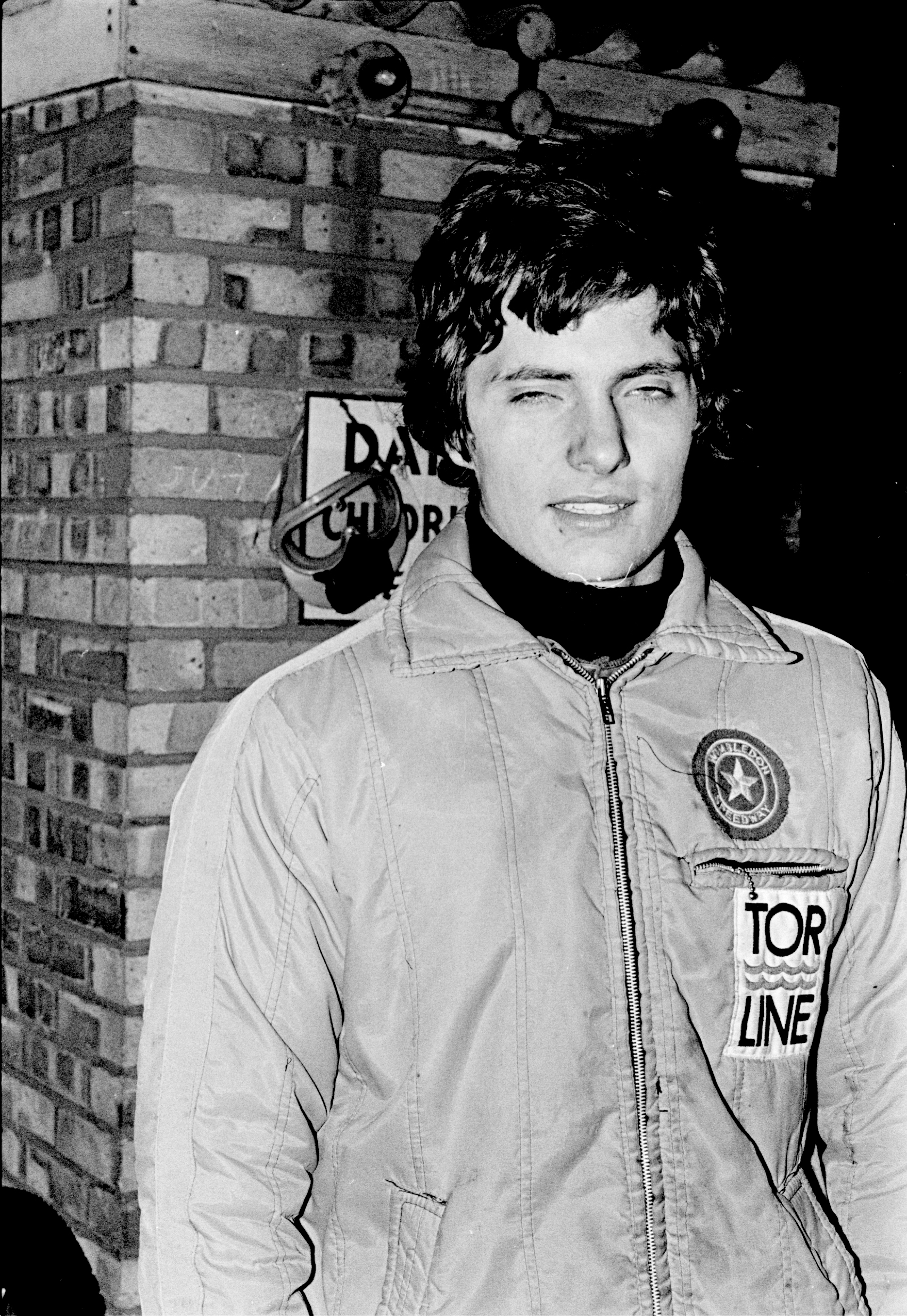
- Tommy Jansson was the 1974 Swedish champion

The 1974 Swedish speedway season was the 1974 season of motorcycle speedway in Sweden.

== Individual ==
=== Individual Championship ===
The 1974 Swedish Individual Speedway Championship final was held on 20 September in Eskilstuna. Tommy Jansson won the Swedish Championship.

| Pos. | Rider | Club | Total |
|---|---|---|---|
| 1 | Tommy Jansson | Smederna | 15 |
| 2 | Anders Michanek | Getingarna | 14 |
| 3 | Tommy Johansson | Dackarna | 13 |
| 4 | Christer Sjösten | Lindarna | 11 |
| 5 | Bernt Persson | Indianerna | 11 |
| 6 | Hans Holmqvist | Indianerna | 9 |
| 7 | Bengt Jansson | Smederna | 9 |
| 8 | Stefan Salmonsson | Smederna | 8 |
| 9 | Christer Löfqvist | Bysarna | 6 |
| 10 | Lars Åke Andersson | Njudungarna | 5 |
| 11 | Käll Haage | Lejonen | 5 |
| 12 | Lars Jansson | Valsarna | 5 |
| 13 | Berndt Johansson | Bysarna | 3 |
| 14 | Eddie Davidsson | Valsarna | 3 |
| 15 | Stefan Johansson (res) | Njudungarna | 2 |
| 16 | Sven Nilsson | Bysarna | 1 |
| 17 | Bengt Larsson | Örnarna | 0 |
| 18 | Kenneth Selmosson (res) | Kaparna | 0 |

=== Junior Championship ===
Winner - Jan Andersson

== Team ==
=== Team Championship ===
Getingarna won division 1 and were declared the winners of the Swedish Speedway Team Championship for the eighth time. The team included Anders Michanek and Leif Enecrona.

Lejonen and Masarna won the second division A & B respectively, while Jämtarna won the third division.

Div 1
| Pos | Team | Pts |
|---|---|---|
| 1 | Getingarna | 16 |
| 2 | Vargarna | 15 |
| 3 | Dackarna | 15 |
| 4 | Smederna | 14 |
| 5 | Örnarna | 14 |
| 6 | Bysarna | 14 |
| 7 | Indianerna | 12 |
| 8 | Njudungarna | 12 |

Div 2A
| Pos | Team | Pts |
|---|---|---|
| 1 | Lejonen | 16 |
| 2 | Skepparna | 16 |
| 3 | Valsarna | 10 |
| 4 | Kaparna | 10 |
| 5 | Filbyterna | 8 |
| 6 | Lindarna | 0 |

Div 2B
| Pos | Team | Pts |
|---|---|---|
| 1 | Masarna | 21 |
| 2 | Vikingarna | 12 |
| 3 | Gamarna | 11 |
| 4 | Piraterna | 10 |
| 5 | Eldarna | 6 |

Div 3
| Pos | Team | Pts |
|---|---|---|
| 1 | Jämtarna | 22 |
| 2 | Hjälmarna | 17 |
| 3 | Stjärnorna | 9 |
| 4 | Pilarna | 9 |
| 5 | Solkatterna | 0 |

== See also ==
- Speedway in Sweden
