= 1987 Swedish speedway season =

Motorcycle racing competition

The 1987 Swedish speedway season was the 1987 season of motorcycle speedway in Sweden.

== Individual ==
=== Individual Championship ===
The 1987 Swedish Individual Speedway Championship final was held in Gothenburg on 29 August. Per Jonsson won the Swedish Championship for the second successive year.

Pos	Rider	Team	Pts	Total
1	Per Jonsson	Getingarna	(2,3,3,3,3)	14
2	Jan Andersson	Vetlanda	(2,3,2,3,3)	13
3	Jimmy Nilsen	Getingarna	(3,3,3,0,2)	11+3
4	Dennis Löfqvist	Bysarna	(3,2,0,3,3)	11+2
5	Erik Stenlund	Getingarna	(1,2,3,1,2)	9
6	Peter Karlsson	Örnarna	(1,d,3,3,1)	8
7	Conny Ivarsson	Vetlanda	(3,0,2,1,2)	8
8	Peter Nahlin	Smederna	(2,3,1,2,0)	8
9	Niklas Karlsson	Örnarna	(d,2,1,2,3)	8
10	Christer Rohlen	Indianerna	(3,1,1,2,1)	8
11	Michael Ritterwall	Vetlanda	(1,2,2,u,2)	7
12	Roland Dannö	Indianerna	(2,0,1,2,1)	6
13	John Staaf	Piraterna	(0,1,2,1,0)	4
14	Conny Samuelsson	Vetlanda	(0,1,0,1,0)	2
15	Tommy Lindgren	Indianerna	(0,1,0,0,1)	2
16	Henrik Gustafsson	Indianerna	(1,u,d,0,0)	1

=== U21 Championship ===
Henrik Gustafsson won the U21 championship for the second consecutive year.

== Team ==
=== Team Championship ===
Vetlanda won the Elitserien and were declared the winners of the Swedish Speedway Team Championship for the sixth time and second year in succession. The Vetlanda team included Jan Andersson, Kenneth Nyström, Conny Ivarsson and Conny Samuelsson.

Gamarna won the first division, while Griparna and Brassarna won the second division north and south respectively.

Elitserien
Pos	Team	Pts
1	Vetlanda	23
2	Örnarna	17
3	Indianerna	15
4	Getingarna	15
5	Vargarna	14
6	Dackarna	12
7	Bysarna	8
8	Smederna	8

Div 1
Pos	Team	Pts
1	Gamarna	25
2	Piraterna	22
3	Lejonen	21
4	Rospiggarna	17
5	Tuna Rebels	13
6	Skepparna	6
7	Solkatterna	6
8	Valsarna	2

Div 2 north
Pos	Team	Pts
1	Griparna	21
2	Masarna	17
3	Gävle	13
4	Filbyterna	9
5	Eldarna	0

Div 2 south
Pos	Team	Pts
1	Brassarna	23
2	Kaparna	17
3	Korparna	13
4	Gnistorna	4
5	Pilarna	3

== See also ==
- Speedway in Sweden
