= 2006 Swedish speedway season =

Motorcycle racing competition

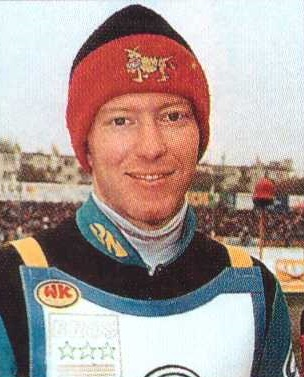
- Australian Jason Crump helped Vetlanda win a second league title in a three year period.

The 2006 Swedish speedway season was the 2006 season of motorcycle speedway in Sweden.

== Individual ==
=== Individual Championship ===
The 2006 Swedish Individual Speedway Championship final was held in Motala on 5 August. Andreas Jonsson won the Swedish Championship for the first time.

Pos	Rider	Team	Pts	Total	SF	Final
1	Andreas Jonsson	Luxo Stars	(3,2,3,3,3)	14	3	3
2	Antonio Lindbäck	Masarna	(1,2,3,3,3)	12	2	2
3	Freddie Lindgren	Masarna	(3,1,2,3,3)	12	3	1
4	Peter Karlsson	Luxo Stars	(3,3,3,3,2)	14	0	0
5	Niklas Klingberg	Vargarna	(1,3,1,2,1)	8	2	
6	Peter Ljung	VMS Elit	(2,2,3,0,2)	9	1	
7	Magnus Zetterström	Indianerna	(0,2,2,2,3)	9	0	
8	Mikael Max	Luxo Stars	(1,0,2,2,2)	7		
9	Freddie Eriksson	Bajen Speedway	(0,3,2,1,0)	6		
10	Thomas H. Jonasson	VMS Elit	(f,3,0,1,1)	5		
11	Daniel Davidsson	Piraterna	(3,1,1,ex,-)	5		
12	Sebastian Aldén	Masarna	(2,0,1,2,0)	5		
13	Rickard Sedelius	Team Dalakraft	(2,0,0,1,1)	4		
14	Stefan Dannö	Bajen Speedway	(2,1,0,1,0)	4		
15	Robert Eriksson	Valsarna	(0,0,1,r,2)	3		
16	Andreas Lekander	Team Bikab	(1,1,0,0,0)	2		
17	Eric Andersson (res)	Smederna	(1)	1		
18	Robert Pettersson (res)	Team Dalakraft	(0)	0		

Key

- points per race - 3 for a heat win, 2 for 2nd, 1 for third, 0 for last
- ex - excluded
- r - retired
- t - tape touching excluded
- f - fell

=== U21 Championship ===
Antonio Lindbäck won the U21 championship.

== Team ==
=== Team Championship ===
Vetlanda won the Elitserien and were declared the winners of the Swedish Speedway Team Championship for the fourth time. The Vetlanda team included Rune Holta, Jason Crump, Lee Richardson and Jarosław Hampel.

Kaparna won the Allsvenskan.

Elitserien
Pos	Team	Pts
1	Vetlanda	34
2	Luxo Stars	32
3	Piraterna	29
4	Västervik	27
5	Indianerna	22
6	Masarna	20
7	Smederna	19
8	Bajen Speedway	18
9	Rospiggarna	16
10	Vargarna	8

Allsvenskan
Pos	Team	Pts
1	Kaparna	19
2	Valsarna	18
3	Lejonen	17
4	Team Dalakraft	17
5	Örnarna	13
6	Team Bikab	11
7	Griparna	9
8	Getingarna	8

Play offs

Elitserien
Stage	Team	Team	Agg Score
SF	Vetlanda	Piraterna	103:89
SF	Vastervik	Luxo Stars	104:88
Final	Vetlanda	Vastervik	103:88

Allsvenskan
Stage	Team	Team	Agg Score
SF	Valsarna	Lejonen	96:96
Final	Kaparna	Valsarna	99:92

Division 1
Pos	Team	Pts
1	Solkatterna	20
2	Bysarna	16
3	Team Kumla	16
4	Nässjö	14
5	Eldarna	14
6	Vikingarna	12
7	Filbyterna	11
8	SMK Gävle	9
