= 1988 Swedish speedway season =

Motorcycle racing competition

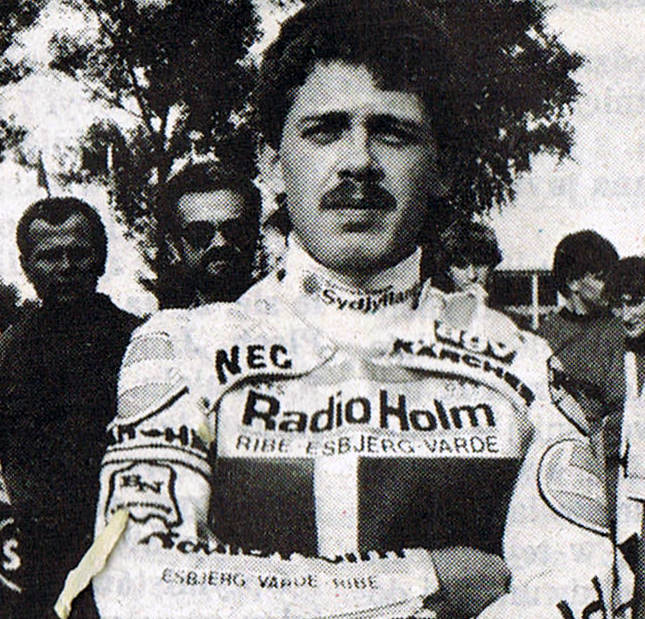
- The Dane Erik Gundersen topped the Vargarna averages

The 1988 Swedish speedway season was the 1988 season of motorcycle speedway in Sweden.

== Individual ==
=== Individual Championship ===
The 1988 Swedish Individual Speedway Championship final was held at the Kumla Motorstadion in Kumla on 27 August. Per Jonsson won the Swedish Championship for the third consecutive year.

Pos	Rider	Team	Pts	Total
1	Per Jonsson	Bysarna	(3,3,3,3,3)	15
2	Roland Dannö	Indianerna	(2,3,3,2,2)	12+3
3	Peter Nahlin	Smederna	(3,2,3,2,2)	12+2
4	Jimmy Nilsen	Stockholm U	(d,3,2,3,3)	11
5	Conny Ivarsson	Vetlanda	(3,3,d,2,1)	9
6	Peter Karlsson	Örnarna	(1,1,1,3,3)	9
7	Mikael Blixt	Indianerna	(3,2,2,1,1)	9
8	Kenneth Nystrom	Vetlanda	(2,1,2,1,2)	8
9	Tony Gudbrand	Örnarna	(0,1,1,2,3)	7
10	Niklas Karlsson	Örnarna	(2,2,2,1,0)	7
11	Christer Rohlen	Indianerna	(1,2,3,d,0)	6
12	Bo Arrhen	Stockholm U	(1,d,1,3,d)	5
13	Krister Gardell	Indianerna	(u,1,0,0,2)	3
14	Tony Rickardsson	Stockholm U	(2,0,1,0,d)	3
15	Kristian Hultgren	Bysarna	(1,0,d,1,1)	3
16	Mikael Teurnberg (res)	Rospiggarna	(1)	1
17	Michael Ritterwall	Vetlanda	(0,0,0)	0
18	Dennis Löfqvist (res)	Bysarna	(0)	0

=== U21 Championship ===
Henrik Gustafsson won the U21 championship for the third consecutive year.

== Team ==
=== Team Championship ===
Bysarna won the Elitserien and were declared the winners of the Swedish Speedway Team Championship for the fourth time. The Bysarna team included Per Jonsson, Tony Olsson, Dennis Löfqvist and Brian Karger.

Getingarna and Gamarna merged to become became Stockholm United and Tuna Rebels changed their name to Eskilstuna.

Rospiggarna won the first division, while Solkatterna and Filbyterna won the second division north and south respectively.

Elitserien
Pos	Team	Pts
1	Bysarna	25
2	Indianerna	22
3	Vetlanda	21
4	Stockholm United	13
5	Örnarna	10
6	Vargarna	10
7	Dackarna	6
8	Smederna	5

Div 1
Pos	Team	Pts
1	Rospiggarna	20
2	Eskilstuna	14
3	Lejonen	10
4	Griparna	8
5	Skepparna	6
6	Brassarna	2

Div 2 north
Pos	Team	Pts
1	Solkatterna	23
2	Valsarna	17
3	Masarna	13
4	Gävle	7
5	Eldarna	2

Div 2 south
Pos	Team	Pts
1	Filbyterna	20
2	Korparna	19
3	Kaparna	17
4	Piraterna	10
5	Gnistorna	4
6	Pilarna	2

== See also ==
- Speedway in Sweden
