= 1968 Swedish speedway season =

Motorcycle racing competition

The 1968 Swedish speedway season was the 1968 season of motorcycle speedway in Sweden.

== Individual ==
=== Individual Championship ===
The 1968 Swedish Individual Speedway Championship final was held on 13 September in Stockholm. Leif Enecrona won the Swedish Championship.

Pos.	Rider	Club	Total
1	Leif Enecrona	Getingarna	14+3
2	Torbjörn Harrysson	Vargarna	14+2
3	Hans Holmqvist	Vargarna	11
4	Ove Fundin	Kaparna	10
5	Anders Michanek	Getingarna	10
6	Per-Olof Söderman	Vargarna	9
7	Sören Sjösten	Vargarna	8
8	Bengt Jansson	Getingarna	7
9	Olle Nygren	Vargarna	7
10	Bengt Larsson	Örnarna	6
11	Bo Josefsson	Njudungarna	6
12	Bengt Andersson	Getingarna	6
13	Bernt Persson	Smederna	5
14	Runo Wedin	Vargarna	3
15	Therje Henriksson	Lejonen	2
16	Gunnar Malmqvist	Njudungarna	2

=== Junior Championship ===
Winner - Hans Johansson

== Team ==
=== Team Championship ===
Kaparna won division 1 and were declared the winners of the Swedish Speedway Team Championship. The Kaparna team included Ove Fundin and Göte Nordin.

Lejonen won the second division and Dackarna and Filbyterna won the third division east and west respectively.

Div 1
Pos	Team	Pts
1	Kaparna	10
2	Njudungarna	10
3	Vargarna	8
4	Getingarna	7
5	Indianerna	5

Div 2
Pos	Team	Pts
1	Lejonen	20.5
2	Örnarna	19
3	Smederna	14.5
4	Masarna	6
5	Taxarna	0

Div 3 E
Pos	Team	Pts
1	Dackarna	18.5
2	Bysarna	13.5
3	Skepparna	12
4	Eldarna	4

Div 3 W
Pos	Team	Pts
1	Filbyterna	21
2	Stjärnorna	20
3	Vikingarna	14
4	Gamarna	4
5	Solkatterna	2

== See also ==
- Speedway in Sweden
