= 1982 Swedish speedway season =

Motorcycle racing competition

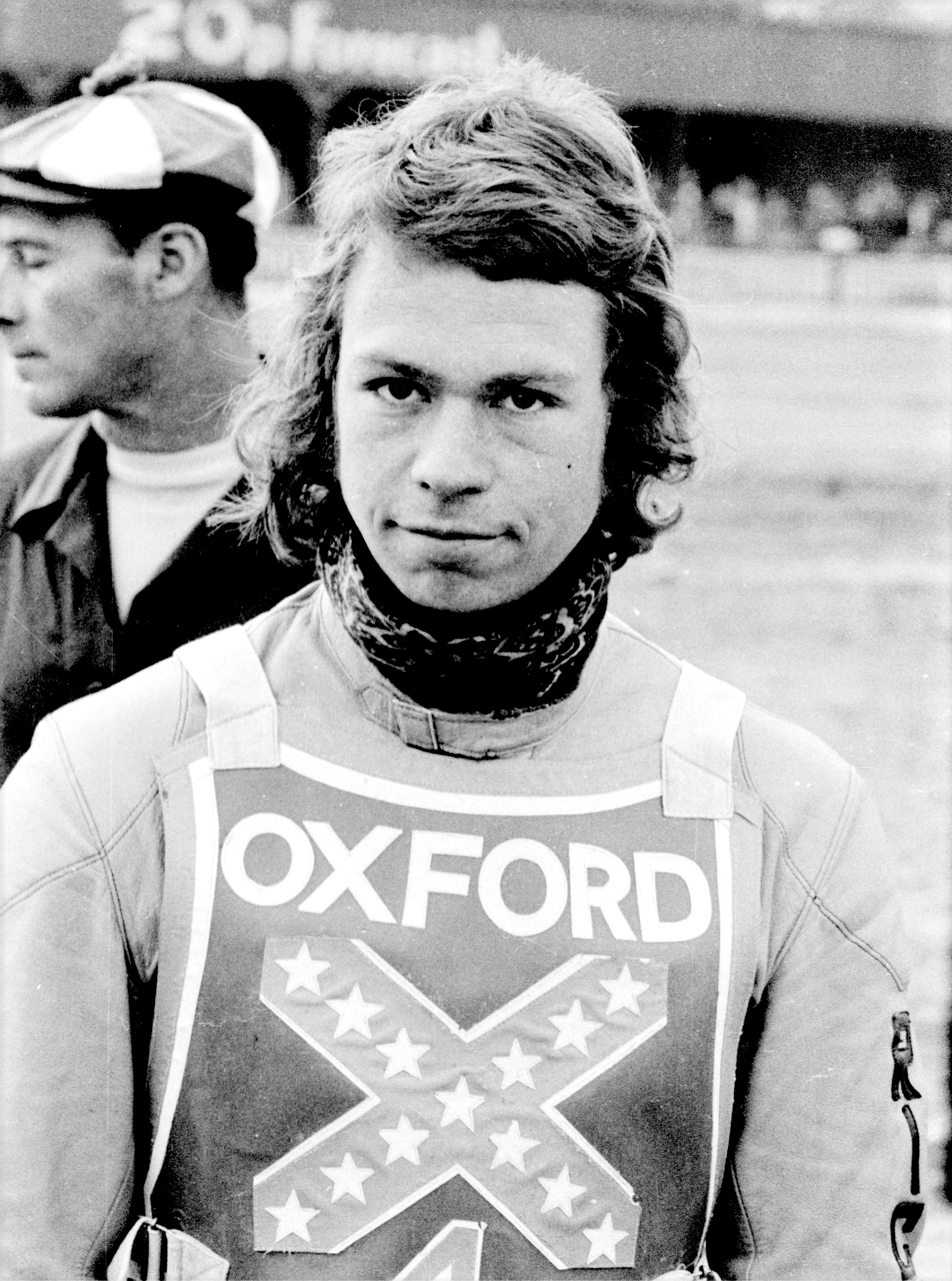
- Richard Hellsen was part of the Getingarna team that won the first Elitserien

The 1982 Swedish speedway season was the 1982 season of motorcycle speedway in Sweden.

== Individual ==
=== Individual Championship ===
The 1982 Swedish Individual Speedway Championship final was held on 10 September in Eskilstuna. Anders Michanek won the Swedish Championship for the fifth time.

Pos.	Rider	Club	Total
1	Anders Michanek	Getingarna	14
2	Tommy Nilsson	Getingarna	13
3	Jan Andersson	Kaparna	12
4	Richard Hellsén	Getingarna	11
5	Per Jonsson	Getingarna	10
6	Hans Danielsson	Lejonen	10
7	Lillebror Johansson	Solkatterna	10
8	Bernt Persson	Smederna	7
9	Uno Johansson	Njudungarna	7
10	Pierre Brannefors	Kaparna	7
11	Karl-Erik Claesson	Örnarna	6
12	Bengt Jansson	Skepparna	5
13	Börje Klingberg	Njudungarna	3
14	Ulf Blomqvist	Njudungarna	3
15	Conny Samuelsson	Njudungarna	1
16	Kent Bäär	Solkatterna	1

=== Junior Championship ===
Winner - Magnus Johnson

== Team ==
=== Team Championship ===
A major change took place for the 1982 season. A new elite division was introduced called the Elitserien. In addition there would be five divisions consisting of two regional leagues in both the first and second divisions.

Getingarna won the Elitserien and were declared the winners of the Swedish Speedway Team Championship for the 12th time. The Getingarna team included Anders Michanek, Tommy Nilsson, Richard Hellsén and Per Jonsson.

Solkatterna and Kaparna won the first division north and south respectively, while Lindarna and Brassarna won the second division northeast and southwest respectively.

Elitserien
Pos	Team	Pts
1	Getingarna	16
2	Njudungarna	12
3	Smederna	10
4	Örnarna	10
5	Indianerna	8
6	Lejonen	4

Div 1 north
Pos	Team	Pts
1	Solkatterna	20
2	Skepparna	16
3	Gamarna	8
4	Rospiggarna	8
5	Masarna	6
6	Eldarna	2

Div 1 south
Pos	Team	Pts
1	Kaparna	18
2	Dackarna	11
3	Vargarna	10
4	Bysarna	10
5	Piraterna	6
6	Filbyterna	5

Div 2 NE & SW
Pos	Team	Pts
1	Lindarna	18
2	Vikingarna	17
3	Valsarna	13
4	Gävle	0
1	Brassarna	10
2	Gnistorna	8
3	Pilarna	6
4	Korparna	0

== See also ==
- Speedway in Sweden
