= 1983 Swedish speedway season =

Motorcycle racing competition

The 1983 Swedish speedway season was the 1983 season of motorcycle speedway in Sweden.

== Individual ==
=== Individual Championship ===
The 1983 Swedish Individual Speedway Championship final was held on 10 September in Mariestad. Tommy Nilsson won the Swedish Championship.

Pos	Rider	Team	Pts	Total
1	Tommy Nilsson	Getingarna	(3,3,3,3,3)	15
2	Jan Andersson	Kaparna	(3,3,3,2,3)	14
3	Bjorn Andersson	Kaparna	(3,2,2,3,1)	11+3
4	Jimmy Nilsen	Getingarna	(2,3,2,2,2)	11+2
5	Lillebror Johansson	Solkatterna	(1,3,2,3,0)	9
6	Anders Michanek	Getingarna	(1,1,3,3,1)	9
7	Karl Erik Claesson	Örnarna	(2,2,3,2,0)	9
8	Pierre Brannefors	Kaparna	(1,2,2,2,2)	9
9	Goran Waltersson	Njudungarna	(3,0,1,1,3)	8
10	Uno Johansson	Njudungarna	(2,1,1,1,3)	8
11	Ulf Blomqvist	Njudungarna	(0.1.1.1.2)	5
12	Anders Kling	Dackarna	(0.2.0.0.2)	4
13	Jan Davidsson	Örnarna	(0,0,1,1,1)	3
14	Ake Fridell	Indianerna	(1,0,0,0,1)	2
15	Bengt Jansson	Rospiggarna	(2.0,d,0,0)	2
16	Conny Samuelsson	Njudungarna	(0,1,0,0,0)	1

=== Swedish U21 Championship ===
Winner - Ove Osterberg

== Team ==
=== Team Championship ===
Njudungarna finished top of the league but Getingarna beat them in the play-off final to win the Elitserien and were declared the winners of the Swedish Speedway Team Championship for the fourteenth time. The Getingarna team included Anders Michanek, Tommy Nilsson and Per Jonsson.

Gamarna and Vargarna won the first division north and south respectively, while Eldarna and Filbyterna won the second division north and south respectively.

Elitserien
Pos	Team	Pts
1	Njudungarna	22
2	Getingarna	16
3	Kaparna	13
4	Smederna	12
5	Örnarna	10
6	Indianerna	7
7	Solkatterna	4

Div 1 north
Pos	Team	Pts
1	Gamarna	21
2	Rospiggarna	14
3	Bysarna	12
4	Masarna	8
5	Lindarna	2

Div 1 south
Pos	Team	Pts
1	Vargarna	24
2	Brassarna	16
3	Dackarna	12
4	Skepparna	11
5	Piraterna	10

Div 2 north & south
Pos	Team	Pts
1	Eldarna	22
2	Valsarna	15
3	Vikingarna	6
4	Gävle	5
1	Filbyterna	12
2	Gnistorna	12
3	Lejonen	9
4	Pilarna	4
5	Korparna	3

== See also ==
- Speedway in Sweden
