= Swedish Junior Speedway Championship =

Speedway competition

- Sport: Speedway
- Founded: 1958
- Country: Sweden
- Most recent champion: Casper Henriksson

The Individual Speedway Junior Swedish Championship is an annual speedway event held each year since 1958. Swedish riders aged 21 and under take part.

== Previous winners ==
Year	Winner	2nd	3rd	Results
1958	Agnar Stenlund	Uno Andersson	Harry Larsson	
1959	Sören Sjösten	Leif Karlsson	Goran Pettersson	
1960	Willihard Thomsson	Sigvard Johansson	Kurt Westlund	
1961	Willihard Thomsson	Hans Utterström	Bo Håkansson	
1962	Stan Karlsson	Hans Utterström	Tord Westlund	
1963	Bengt Ederlöv	Rolf Ekberg	Soren Everlid	
1964	Karl Erik Andersson	Nils Ringstrom	Hans Olsson	
1965	Therje Henriksson	Hans Olsson	Willy Friberg	
1966	Egon Stengarn	Lennart Karlsson	Jan Holmqvist	
1967	Christer Löfqvist	John Strid	Hans Johansson	
1968	Hans Johansson	Benny Lundstrom	Kenneth Selmosson	
1969	Karl Erik Claesson	Anders Lövgren	Anders Jansson	
1970	Tommy Jansson	Christer Sjosten	Peter Carlson	
1971	Lars Inge Hultberg	Borje Klingberg	Stefan Salmonsson	
1972	Tommy Pettersson	Stefan Johansson	Jan Nilsson	
1973	Sven Andersson	Richard Hellsen	Kent Pettersson	
1974	Jan Andersson	Jan Sylvefjord	Thord Löwdin	
1975	Bo Jansson	Thord Löwdin	Kent Eriksson	
1976	Jan Davidsson	Lars Ericsson	Tommy Karlsson	
1977	Peter Johansson	Uno Johansson	Hans Danielsson	
1978	Lennart Bengtsson	Alfa Trofast	Thomas Hydling	
1979	Lars Rosberg	Christer Nilsson	Jerry Karlsson	
1980	Pierre Brannefors	Magnus Johnson	Ulf Blomqvist	
1981	Anders Kling	Anders Eriksson	Magnus Johnson	
1982	Magnus Johnson	Kjell Nielsen	Leif Wahlman	
1983	Ove Osterberg	Leif Wahlman	Jimmy Nilsen	
1984	Jimmy Nilsen	Tony Olsson	Patrick Karlsson	
1985	Mikael Blixt	Tony Olsson	Michael Messing	
1986	Henrik Gustafsson	Dennis Lofqvist	Christer Karlsson	
1987	Henrik Gustafsson	Niklas Karlsson	Bo Arrhen	
1988	Henrik Gustafsson	Peter Karlsson	Christer Karlsson	
1989	Henrik Gustafsson	Tony Rickardsson	Stefan Dannö	
1990	Joakim Karlsson	Tony Rickardsson	Stefan Dannö	
1991	Jorgen Hultgren	Stefan Andersson	Mikael Karlsson	
1992	Mikael Karlsson	Stefan Andersson	Niklas Klingberg	
1993	Niklas Klingberg	Jonathan Forsgren	Stefan Ekberg	
1994	Daniel Andersson	Marcus Andersson	Robert Eriksson	
1995	Robert Eriksson	Daniel Andersson	Anders Henriksson	
1996	Emil Lindqvist	Peter I. Karlsson	Anders Henriksson	
1997	Peter I. Karlsson	Emil Lindqvist	Tobias Johansson	
1998	Andreas Jonsson	Bjorn Gustavsson	Patrick Dybeck	
1999	Joonas Kylmäkorpi	Andreas Jonsson	Freddie Eriksson	
2000	Andreas Jonsson	Emil Kramer	Mattias Nilsson	
2001	David Ruud	Daniel Davidsson	Jonas Davidsson	
2002	Freddie Eriksson	Peter Ljung	Kim Jansson	
2003	Freddie Lindgren	Peter Ljung	Jonas Davidsson	
2004	Freddie Lindgren	Antonio Lindbäck	Jonas Davidsson	
2005	Jonas Davidsson	Antonio Lindbäck	Freddie Lindgren	
2006	Antonio Lindbäck	Sebastian Aldén	Thomas H. Jonasson	
2007	Robert Pettersson	Andreas Messing	Ricky Kling	
2008	Ricky Kling	Simon Gustafsson	Ludvig Lindgren	
2009	Thomas H. Jonasson	Dennis Andersson	Linus Sundström	
2010	Dennis Andersson	Linus Eklöf	Linus Sundström	
2011	Simon Gustafsson	Linus Sundström	Kim Nilsson	
2012	Dennis Andersson	Anders Mellgren	Jacob Thorssell	
2013	Fredrik Engman	Oliver Berntzon	Mathias Thörnblom	
2014	Fredrik Engman	Victor Palovaara	Oliver Berntzon	
2015	Fredrik Engman	Victor Palovaara	John Lindman	
2016	Joel Andersson	Joel Kling	Alexander Johansson	
2017	Alexander Woentin	Joel Andersson	Filip Hjelmland	
2018	Joel Kling	Anton Karlsson	Jonathan Grahn	
2019	Alexander Woentin	Filip Hjelmland	Anton Karlsson	
2020	Alexander Woentin	Philip Hellström Bängs	Jonatan Grahn	
2021	Gustav Grahn	Philip Hellström Bängs	Casper Henriksson	
2022	Casper Henriksson	Gustav Grahn	Philip Hellström Bängs	
2023	Casper Henriksson	Noel Wahlqvist	Avon Van Dyck	
2024	Philip Hellström Bängs	Casper Henriksson	Sammy van Dyck	
2025	Rasmus Karlsson	Casper Henriksson	Erik Persson	

== See also ==
- History of motorcycle speedway in Sweden
