= Richard Hellsen =

Swedish speedway rider

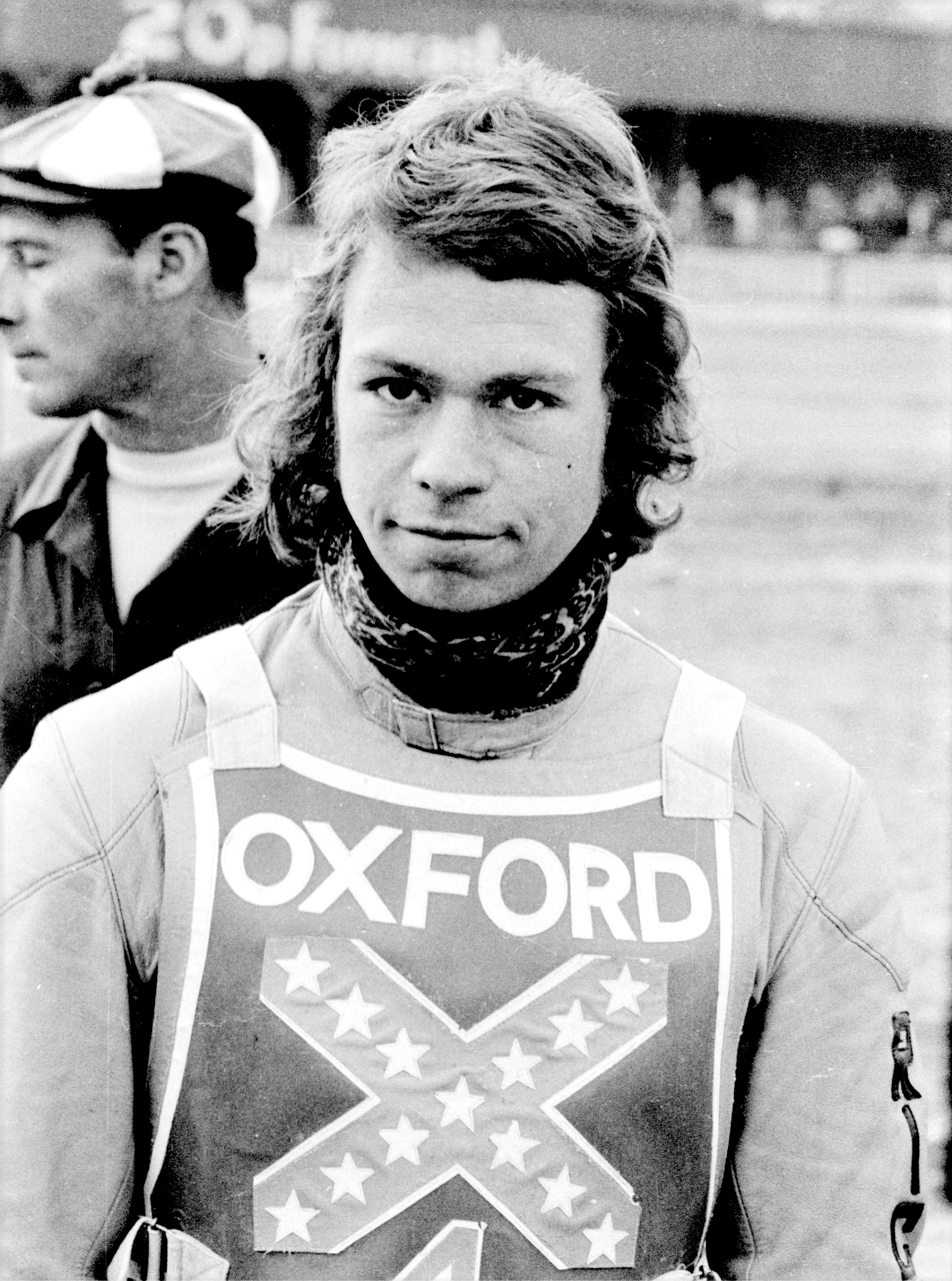
- Born: 1 June 1951; Stockholm, Sweden
- Nationality: Swedish

Career history

Sweden
- 1972: Stjärnorna
- 1973–1982: Getingarna

Great Britain
- 1973, 1976–1985: King's Lynn Stars
- 1975: Oxford Rebels
- 1976: White City Rebels
- 1986–1988: Swindon Robins
- 1989–1990, 1992–1995: Long Eaton Invaders
- 1991: Peterborough Panthers
- 1991: Hackney Hawks
- 1992: Milton Keynes Knights

Individual honours
- 1973: Swedish Junior Championship silver

Team honours
- 1974, 1978, 1979, 1980, 1981: Allsvenskan Champion
- 1982: Elitserien Champion
- 1975: Midland Cup winner
- 1977: British League KO Cup Winner
- 1980: Gauntlet Gold Cup

John Rickard Hellsén, also known as Richard Hellsen during his speedway career, is a Swedish former speedway rider. He earned 22 caps for the Sweden national speedway team.

== Career ==
Hellsen began his career with Stjärnorna during the 1972 Swedish speedway season. The following year, he made his British leagues debut riding with the King's Lynn Stars in the 1973 British League season, although he only rode 4 times that season. During the 1973 season, he won the silver medal at the Swedish Junior Speedway Championship.

Hellsen was a three-time gold medalist in the Swedish Pairs Championship (1979, 1981, 1982) and a five-time gold medalist in the Swedish Speedway Team Championship, in 1974, 1978, 1979, 1981 and 1982 (all whilst riding with Getingarna).

Meanwhile in Britain, it was with Oxford Rebels that Hellsen was part of the Midland Cup winning team in 1975. The team transferred to White City under Danny Dunton and Bob Dugard in 1976 after fears that the stadium at Cowley was to be sold for development. He then became a regular heat leader with King's Lynn, for ten years from 1976 to 1985.

Hellsen was a finalist of the 1980 Speedway World Pairs Championship, in Krško and finished just outside the medals in fourth place. He was also a multiple representative of Sweden in the qualifying rounds of the World Cup team.

== Personal life ==
Hellsen retired in 1996 and since retiring has been restoring Volkswagen Beetles, building hot rods and Volkrods.

Hellsen lives in Beccles, Suffolk, and has two grandsons: Jack aged 4 and Ezra who is just 1 year old.(2016)[Source:Interview with Karl Fiala of Speedway Friends]

== World Final appearances ==
=== World Pairs Championship ===
- 1980 - (Socialist Federal Republic of Yugoslavia) Krško, Matija Gubec Stadium (with Jan Andersson) - 4th - 18pts (9)
