= Victor Palovaara =

Swedish speedway rider (born 1994)

- Born: 31 January 1994 (age 32); Karlstad, Sweden
- Nationality: Swedish

Career history

Sweden
- 2010–2012, 2014–2016, 2021–2022: Valsarna
- 2011: Avantia
- 2012: Örnarna
- 2012–2014: Dackarna
- 2013, 2022–2024: Rospiggarna
- 2015–2016, 2018: Piraterna
- 2017–2018: Indianerna
- 2017: Västervik
- 2019–2021: Vetlanda
- 2019: Team Rapid
- 2023–2025: Solkatterna
- 2025: Vargarna

Great Britain
- 2014-2015: Glasgow
- 2016: Newcastle
- 2018, 2019, 2025: Edinburgh

Poland
- 2022: Daugavpils
- 2023: Ostrów
- 2024: Landshut

Denmark
- 2014: Grindsted

Team honours
- 2014: Team Junior World Championships bronze

Victor Palovaara (born 31 January 1994) is a Swedish international speedway rider.

== Speedway career ==
After winning two medals at the Team Speedway Junior European Championship (a silver in 2010 and bronze in 2011), Palovaara came to prominence in 2014, when he was part of the Swedish team that the bronze medal at the 2014 Team Speedway Junior World Championship. The same year, he joined Glasgow Tigers for the 2014 Premier League speedway season and 2015 Premier League speedway season.

In 2015, Palovaara finished ninth in the 2015 Speedway Under-21 World Championship and won a third medal (silver) at the European teams. He left Glasgow to join Newcastle Diamonds for the 2016 Premier League speedway season. He did not ride in Britain during 2017, but came back as part of the Edinburgh Monarchs team for the SGB Championship 2018 & SGB Championship 2019 campaigns.

In his native Sweden, Palovaara rode for Vetlanda in 2019 and 2020, and Rospiggarna in 2022. Also in 2022, he finished foutth at the 2022 European Pairs Speedway Championship and helped Valsarna win the Allsvenskan during the 2022 Swedish Speedway season.

Palovaara returned to Edinburgh Monarchs for the SGB Championship 2025.
