= Dennis Andersson =

Swedish motorcycle speedway rider

- Born: 3 June 1991 (age 35); Avesta, Sweden
- Nationality: Swedish

Career history

Sweden
- 2012: Hammarby
- 2013–2014: Dackarna

Poland
- 2009–2012: Wrocław
- 2013: Rzeszów
- 2014: Bydgoszcz

Great Britain
- 2011–2013: Poole

Denmark
- 2009: Vojens
- 2010: Holsted

Individual honours
- 2010: U-19 European Champion
- 2010, 2012: U-21 Swedish Champion

Dennis Gustav Martin Andersson (born 3 June 1991) is a former motorcycle speedway rider from Sweden.

== Career ==
Andersson rode for the Atlas Wrocław in the Polish Speedway Ekstraliga and continued to ride for the club until the end of the 2012 season. In 2013, he joined Stal Rzeszów for one season before completing a final season in Poland with Polonia Bydgoszcz. His British league debut came in 2011 for the Poole Pirates, where he would spend three seasons in total at the club.

Andersson won the 2010 Under-19 European Champion title. He also won the Swedish U-21 Championship on two occasions in 2010 and 2012.

== Results ==
European Championships

- Individual U-19 European Championship
  - 2008 - (Germany) Stralsund - 7th place (9 pts)
  - 2009 - (Poland) Tarnów - 7th place (8 pts)
  - 2010 - (Croatia) Goričan - Under-19 European Champion (14+3 pts)
- Team U-19 European Championship
  - 2009 - (Denmark) Holsted - Runner-up (8 pts)

== See also ==
- Sweden national speedway team
- Speedway in Sweden
