= Vetlanda Motorstadion =

Stadium in Vetlanda, Sweden

- Location: Valhallavägen, 574 34 Vetlanda, Sweden
- Coordinates: 57°26′06″N 15°06′05″E
- Capacity: 10,000
- Operator: Njudungarna motorcycle speedway
- Opened: 24 June 1949
- Length: 355 m (0.221 mi)

Vetlanda Motorstadion or the Hasses Motorstadion (for sponsorship purposes) is a motorcycle speedway track located in the north eastern outskirts of Vetlanda. The track is on the Valhallavägen road and largely surrounded by forest.

The stadium hosts the Njudungarna speedway team (previously known as Elit Vetlanda Speedway) that compete in the Swedish Speedway Team Championship. The speedway team have been champions of Sweden 11 times racing under the name of Vetlanda.

== History ==
Work began on the track on 12 October 1946, when the area was rented by Vetlanda Motorsällskap from farmer Henric Wictorin. It opened on 24 June 1949. The venue hosted the World Championship round known as the Intercontinental final in 1982, 1985 and 1988. The 1982 event set a record stadium attendance of 11,517.

In addition to the intercontinental finals, it has also hosted multiple finals of the Swedish Individual Speedway Championship in 1976, 1981, 1991,1997, 2005, 2012 and 2013.

The record league attendance of 8,703 was set on 27 September 2005 in the fixture between VMS Elit and Västervik beating the previous best of 7,256 from 2004.

In 2020, the club signed a three-year agreement with the company Hasses Gatukök & Pizzeria for naming rights to the stadium.

== Track records ==
- 361m, Jason Crump, 62.4 seconds, 7 May 2008
- 355m, Andreas Jonsson, 61.2 seconds, 15 August 2011
- 355m, Jaroslaw Hampel, 62.5 seconds
- 355m, Adrian Miedziński, 62.5 seconds
