= Daniel Nermark =

Swedish speedway rider

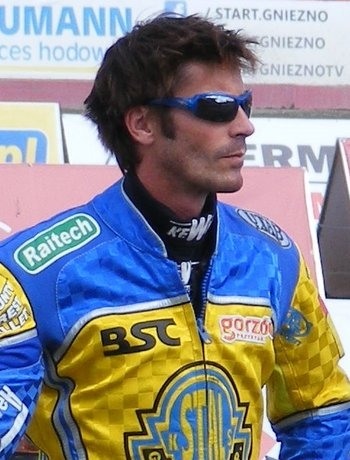
- Born: 30 July 1977 (age 49); Karlstad, Sweden
- Nationality: Swedish

Career history

Sweden
- 1997, 2000: Karlstad
- 1997–2002, 2009–2012: Valsarna
- 2003–2006: Vargarna
- 2006–2008: Solkatterna
- 2007: Kaparna
- 2008–2009: Piraterna
- 2013–2014: Västervik

Great Britain
- 2001–2002, 2004: Wolverhampton Wolves
- 2003: Ipswich Witches
- 2005: Edinburgh Monarchs
- 2006–2007, 2012: King's Lynn Stars
- 2008: Workington Comets
- 2011: Birmingham Brummies

Poland
- 2003–2004, 2006, 2013: Gorzów
- 2008–2009: Ostrów
- 2010: Rybnik
- 2011–2012: Częstochowa
- 2014: Grudziądz

Denmark
- 2000: Holstebro
- 2010: Slangerup

Individual honours
- 2012: Swedish Champion

Team honours
- 2002: Elite League Champion
- 1998, 1999: Swedish Elitserien Champion
- 2006: Premier League Champion
- 2006: Premier League KO Cup Winner
- 2006: Premier Trophy Winner
- 2008: Premier League Pairs Champion

Daniel Karl Nermark (born 30 July 1977, in Karlstad, Sweden) is a former international motorcycle speedway rider from Sweden. He earned 5 caps for the Sweden national speedway team.

== Career summary ==
Nermark first rode in the UK in 2001 when he signed for the Wolverhampton Wolves. In his second season Wolves won the Elite League. In 2005, he dropped down to the Premier League with the Edinburgh Monarchs. He joined the King's Lynn Stars in 2006 and was part of their treble winning side.

Nermark was retained in 2007 and finished third in the Premier League averages behind Chris Holder and Magnus Zetterstrom, and was voted Premier League Rider of the Year by his fellow professionals. In 2008, he won the Premier League Pairs Championship partnering Kauko Nieminen for Workington Comets, during the 2008 Premier League speedway season.

In December 2007, it was announced Nermark had signed for the Workington Comets on a full transfer from the Wolverhampton Wolves. Despite being offered a team place, Nermark decided not to return to Workington in 2009.

In 2012, Nermark became the Swedish national champion after winning the Speedway Swedish Individual Championship.

Nermark last rode in his native Sweden for Västervik from 2013 to 2014.
