= Robin Aspegren =

Swedish speedway rider

- Born: 24 March 1989 (age 37); Vetlanda, Sweden
- Nationality: Swedish

Career history

Sweden
- 2005–2007: Njudungarna
- 2007: Lejonen
- 2007–2008: Vetlanda

Great Britain
- 2010–2011: Newport
- 2012: Swindon
- 2012–2013: Berwick
- 2015: Rye House

Poland
- 2009–2010: Gniezno

Team honours
- 2006: Elitserien

Robin Alexander Aspegren (born 24 March 1989) is a former motorcycle speedway rider from Sweden.

== Career ==
During the 2006 Swedish speedway season, Aspegren won the Swedish Speedway Team Championship with Vetlanda.

Aspegren made his debut in Britain, when joining Newport Wasps for the 2010 Premier League speedway season. He also spent the 2011 season with the Welsh club before moving to Swindon Robins in the Elite League and Berwick Bandits in the Premier League for the 2012 season.

Aspegren's final season was 2015, when he rode for Rye House Rockets but did have a half-season comeback for Vetlanda in 2021.
