= Lars-Åke Andersson =

Swedish speedway rider

- Born: 5 October 1946 (age 80); Sweden
- Nationality: Swedish

Career history
- 1968-1979: Njudungarna Vetlanda

Team honours
- 1976: Speedway World Team Cup bronze medal
- 1976: Allsvenskan Champion
- 1975: Allsvenskan Div 2 Champion

Lars-Åke Andersson is a former international speedway rider from Sweden. He is not to be confused with Åke Andersson, another Swedish international rider from the same time period.

== Speedway career ==
Andersson won a bronze medal at the Speedway World Team Cup in the 1976 Speedway World Team Cup. During the same season, he toured the United Kingdom with the Vetlanda team.

== World final appearances ==
=== World Team Cup ===
- 1976 – (England) London, White City Stadium (with Bernt Persson / Anders Michanek / Bengt Jansson / Christer Löfqvist) – 3rd – 26pts
