= Hammarby Speedway =

Swedish motorcycle speedway team

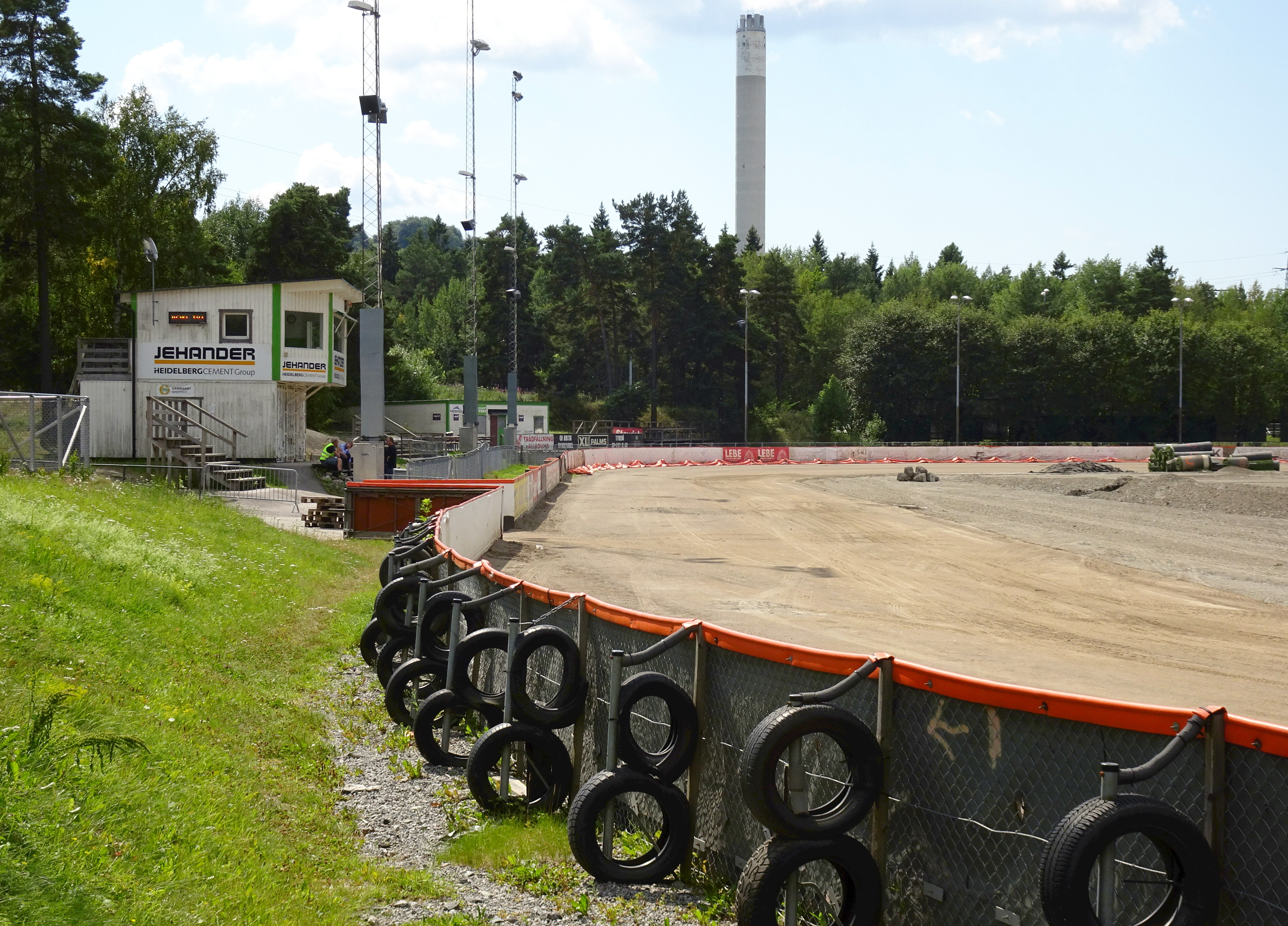
- The speedway track in 2016 in the process of being replaced

Club information
- Track address: Hammarby IP and Gubbängens IP; Stockholm, Sweden
- Country: Sweden
- Founded: 2004
- Closed: 2016

Club facts
- Track size: 376 metres
- Track record time: 65.2 seconds
- Track record date: 6 September 2011
- Track record holder: Magnus Zetterstrom

Major team honours
Hammarby
Elitserien Bronze	2007
Allsvenskan Gold	2010
Monarkerna
Second Tier Winners	1952
First Tier Winners	1955, 1956

Hammarby IF Speedway was a Swedish motorcycle speedway team based in Stockholm, Sweden. The club has not been competing in the domestic leagues since 2016, after their home ground Gubbängens IP was demolished. Their biggest success was winning the bronze medal in Elitserien in 2007.

== History ==
=== SMK Stockholm and Monarkerna ===
SMK Stockholm were one of the seven inaugural members of the Swedish speedway league, which started during the 1948 Swedish speedway season. They raced at Hammarby IP, a ground based in Södermalm, an area Hammarby IF considers its heartland. In 1950, SMK Stockholm became Monarkerna (the Monarchs) and the team won the Swedish Speedway Team Championship in 1955 and 1956, with riders such as Olle Nygren and Ulf Ericsson. Monarkerna competed until the end of the 1963 Swedish speedway season.

=== Hammarby IF ===
In 2004, Hammarby IF Speedway was established, as a section under multi-sports club Hammarby IF. Gary Selan was the driving force behind the project and became the first team president. Racing at Gubbängens IP, in a suburban district in the southern part of Stockholm. The club (colloquially known as Bajen Speedway) went on to compete in the second tier Allsvenskan during their inaugural season, which was the 2004 Swedish speedway season. In 2005, Hammarby won the Allsvenskan in superior style and secured a promotion to Elitserien.

In 2006, Hammarby signed former World Champion Nicki Pedersen, who was a leading rider in the Elitserien in his debut season. The club's biggest success came in 2007, when they finished second in the table in the regular season before winning the bronze medal in the playoffs.

After a promising start to the 2008 Elitserien season, Hammarby dropped off in the table in the second half, and ultimately finished in eight place. At the end of the year, the club chose to withdraw from he league due to financial difficulties. They competed in Allsvenskan in 2009 and 2010, before returning to Elitserien in 2011 with World Champion Tomasz Gollob as one of their riders.

Hammarby competed in Elitserien for the last time in 2013, before getting relegated to Allsvenskan. The club was, however, expelled from the second division at the end of 2014 due to financial problems.

At the end of 2016, the club was effectively dissolved, after not being able to find a track to race on in the Stockholm area. After competing in Division 1, the domestic third tier, for several seasons, it had been announced that Hammarby's home ground Gubbängens IP would be demolished. At its peak, Hammarby drew regular attendances of some 2,000 people.

== Notable riders ==
- (Sweden) Freddie Eriksson (2004–2008, 2013)
- (Denmark) Nicki Pedersen (2006–2007)
- (United Kingdom) Scott Nicholls (2007–2008)
- (Poland) Tomasz Gollob (2011–2013)
