= Vetlanda Speedway =

Swedish motorcycle speedway team

Njudungarna Vetlanda Speedway

Club information
- Track address: Vetlanda Motorstadion
- Country: Sweden
- Founded: 1946
- Team manager: Viktor Stendahl
- Team captain: Peter Ljung
- League: Allsvenskan

Club facts
- Track size: 355 metres
- Track record time: 62.5 seconds
- Track record holder: Jaroslaw Hampel & Adrian Miedzinski

Major team honours
Elitserien Gold	1976, 1986, 1987, 2004, 2006, 2012, 2014, 2015
Elitserien Silver	1967, 1968, 1969, 1977, 1978, 1979, 1980, 1981, 1982, 1983, 1984, 2005, 2013, 2017
Elitserien Bronze	1970, 1988, 1990, 1991, 1994

Njudungarna or Vetlanda Speedway are a motorcycle speedway team based in Vetlanda, Sweden, who compete in the Swedish Speedway Team Championship. They race at the Vetlanda Motorstadion and are ten times champions of Sweden.

== History ==
=== 1946 to 1965 ===
The club was formed in 1946, and arranged their first meeting three years later. The team raced as Njudungarna and first participated in the league system during the 1961 Swedish speedway season although a team called Vetlanda had raced in 1950.

=== 1967 to 1985 ===
They raced in the highest division of Swedish speedway for the first time in 1967, following their promotion after they won the second division in 1966. In their maiden season in the top league they finished runner-up to Getingarna, a feat they repeated again the next two seasons in 1969 and 1970. The main riders during the successful period included Bo Josefsson, Conny Samuelsson, Bo Wirebrand and Gunnar Malmqvist.

The club were relegated in 1974 but bounced straight back after winning the second division again in 1975. The following season the club finally won their long awaited Swedish Speedway Team Championship and then underwent a silver period of success. They won the silver medal (2nd in the league) for eight consecutive years from 1977 to 1984. Riders such as Lars-Åke Andersson, Christer Löfqvist, Conny Ivarsson and Börje Klingberg, helped the club achieve the success.

=== 1986 to 1999 ===
In 1986, the name Njudungarna was dropped in favour of Vetlanda and the success continued. Jan Andersson, Kenneth Nyström and Claes Ivarsson were signed and the team won another two championships in 1986 and 1987. Hans Nielsen signed for the club in 1990 and topped the league averages. The club continued to compete in the Elitserien until the end of 1999. The Njudungarna name was revived in 1992 for the Vetlanda 'B' team.

=== 2000 to 2021 ===
In 2000 the club were placed in the Allsvenskan. In 2002, they were promoted back to the Elitserien and in 2003, they raced as VMS Elit. Their 7th and 8th Championships were won in 2004 and 2006 respectively, with riders such as Rune Holta, Wiesław Jaguś, Aleš Dryml Jr., Jason Crump, Lee Richardson and Jarosław Hampel.

The club experienced further success from 2012 to 2015, winning the championship three times and bringing their number of titles to 11 (just 3 behind the record of 14 held by Getingarna). The riders during this period included Thomas H. Jonasson, Tai Woffinden, Bartosz Zmarzlik and Leon Madsen.

The name Elit Vetlanda Speedway was adopted in 2018 and the club finished in the top four of the Elitserien from 2018 to 2020. In 2021, they finished 5th and were eliminated in the play off quarter final. On 30 March 2022, Elit Vetlanda Speedway applied for bankruptcy, which was approved by the Eksjö Local Court. The club also withdrew from the Elitserien.

=== 2022-present ===
A team using the original name of Njudungarna was entered in the third tier division 1 for the 2022 Swedish speedway season and opted for the Allsvenskan in 2023. They went on to win the Allsvenskan that season.

== Previous teams ==
Extended content

2019 team

- (Australia) Troy Batchelor
- (Australia) Brady Kurtz
- (Poland) Bartosz Zmarzlik
- (Poland) Dominik Kubera
- (Poland) Szymon Woźniak
- (Russia) Artem Laguta
- (Sweden) Victor Palovaara
- (Sweden) Filip Hjelmland
- (Denmark) Andreas Lyager

2020 team

- (Australia) Brady Kurtz
- (Denmark) Andreas Lyager
- (Poland) Bartosz Zmarzlik
- (Poland) Dominik Kubera
- (Poland) Szymon Woźniak
- (Sweden) Peter Ljung
- (Sweden) Jonathan Ejnermark
- (Sweden) Johan Jensen
- (Sweden) Victor Palovaara
- (Sweden) Filip Hjelmland
- (Sweden) Jörn Pöker
- (Sweden) Alexander Woentin

2021 team

- (Poland) Dominik Kubera
- (Sweden) Victor Palovaara
- (Australia) Brady Kurtz
- (Sweden) Peter Ljung
- (Poland) Bartosz Zmarzlik
- (Sweden) Filip Hjelmland
- (Sweden) Robin Aspegren
- (Poland) Tomasz Gapinski
- (Poland) Szymon Wozniak
- (Norway) Rune Holta

== Notable riders ==
- (Australia) Leigh Adams
- (Sweden) Jan Andersson
- (Sweden) Lars-Åke Andersson
- (Sweden) Ulf Blomqvist
- (Australia) Jason Crump
- (Czech Republic) Aleš Dryml Jr.
- (Poland) Jarosław Hampel
- (Norway) Rune Holta
- (Sweden) Claes Ivarsson
- (Sweden) Conny Ivarsson
- (Poland) Wiesław Jaguś
- (Sweden) Uno Johansson
- (Sweden) Thomas H. Jonasson
- (Sweden) Bo Josefsson
- (Poland) Janusz Kołodziej
- (Sweden) Peter Ljung
- (Denmark) Leon Madsen
- (Sweden) Gunnar Malmqvist
- (Denmark) Hans Nielsen
- (Sweden) Kenneth Nyström
- (England) Lee Richardson
- (Russia) Emil Sayfutdinov
- (Sweden) Conny Samuelsson
- (Sweden) Alf Trofast
- (Slovakia) Martin Vaculík
- (Sweden) Göran Waltersson
- (Sweden) Bo Wirebrand
- (England) Simon Wigg
- (England) Tai Woffinden
- (Poland) Bartosz Zmarzlik

== World champions ==
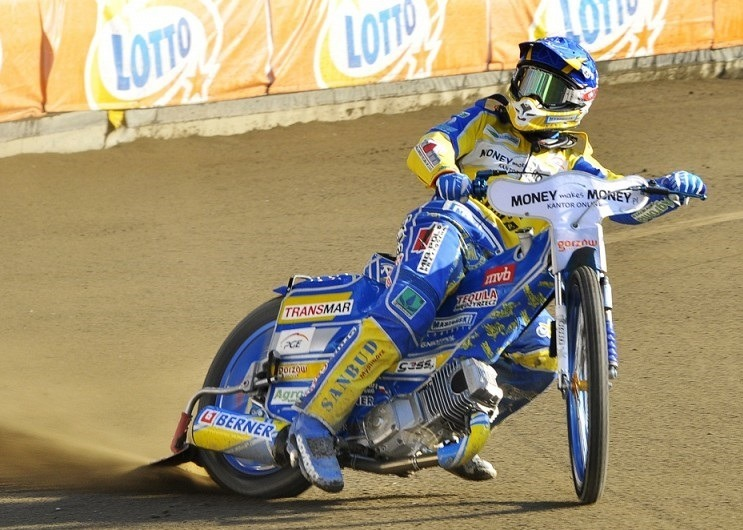
Bartosz Zmarzlik

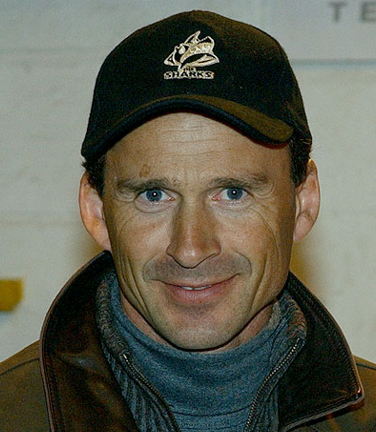
Hans Nielsen

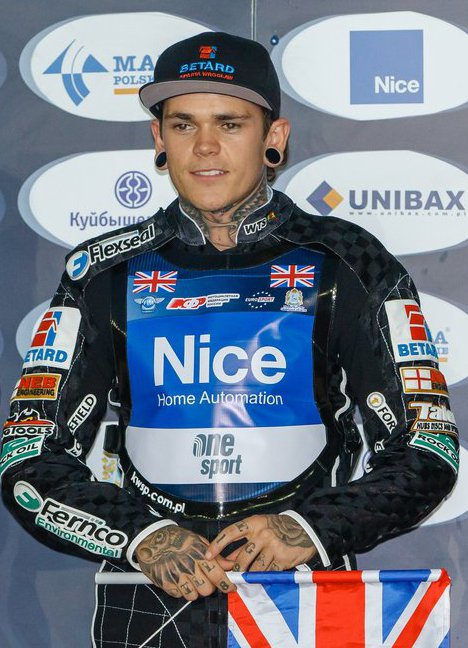
Tai Woffinden

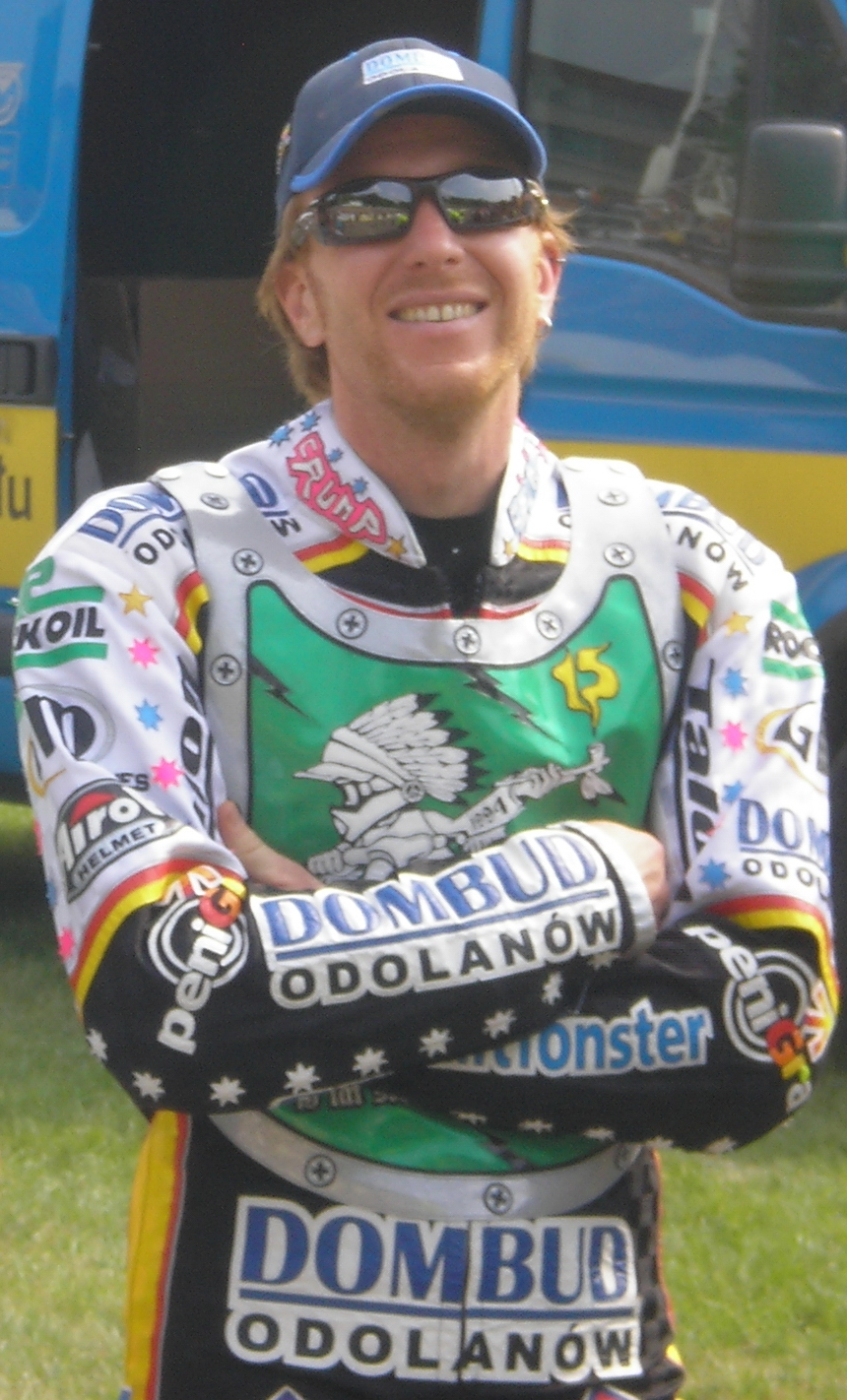
Jason Crump
