= Bo Wirebrand =

Swedish speedway rider

- Born: 2 March 1946 (age 80); Vetlanda, Sweden
- Nationality: Swedish

Career history

Sweden
- 1970, 1972-1981: Njudungarna
- 1971: Vargarna

Great Britain
- 1971, 1973: Poole Pirates
- 1972: Newport Wasps
- 1978: Sheffield Tigers

Individual honours
- 1973: Swedish Championship silver

Team honours
- 1976: Allsvenskan Champion
- 1975: Allsvenskan Div 2 Champion

Bo Sven Hakan Wirebrand (born 2 March 1946) is a former international motorcycle speedway rider from Sweden. He earned 16 caps for the Sweden national speedway team.

== Speedway career ==
Wirebrand won the silver medal at the 1973 Swedish Championship.

In 1971, Wirebrand signed for Poole Pirates and then rode in the top tier of British Speedway from 1971 to 1978, riding for various clubs.

In the Swedish Speedway Team Championship, Wirebrand primarily rode for Njudungarna Vetlanda.
