= Börje Klingberg =

Swedish speedway rider

- Born: 29 May 1952 (age 74); Mariestad, Sweden
- Nationality: Swedish

Career history

Sweden
- 1970-1981, 1984-1985: Örnarna
- 1982-1983: Njudungarna

Great Britain
- 1980: Eastbourne Eagles

Team honours
- 1978: World Pairs finalist
- 1976: Allsvenskan Div 2 Champion

Börje Klingberg (born 29 May 1952) is a former international speedway rider from Sweden. He earned 5 caps for the Sweden national speedway team.

== Speedway career ==
In the Swedish Speedway Team Championship, Klingberg primarily rode for Njudungarna Vetlanda.

Klingberg reached the final of the Speedway World Pairs Championship in the 1978 Speedway World Pairs Championship.

Klingberg rode in the top tier of British Speedway in 1980, riding for Eastbourne Eagles.

== World Final appearances ==
=== World Pairs Championship ===
- 1978 - (Poland) Chorzów, Silesian Stadium (with Jan Andersson) - 7th - 11pts

== Family ==
Klingberg's son Niklas is also a former Swedish international speedway rider.
