= Peter Ljung (speedway rider) =

Swedish motorcycle speedway rider (born 1982)

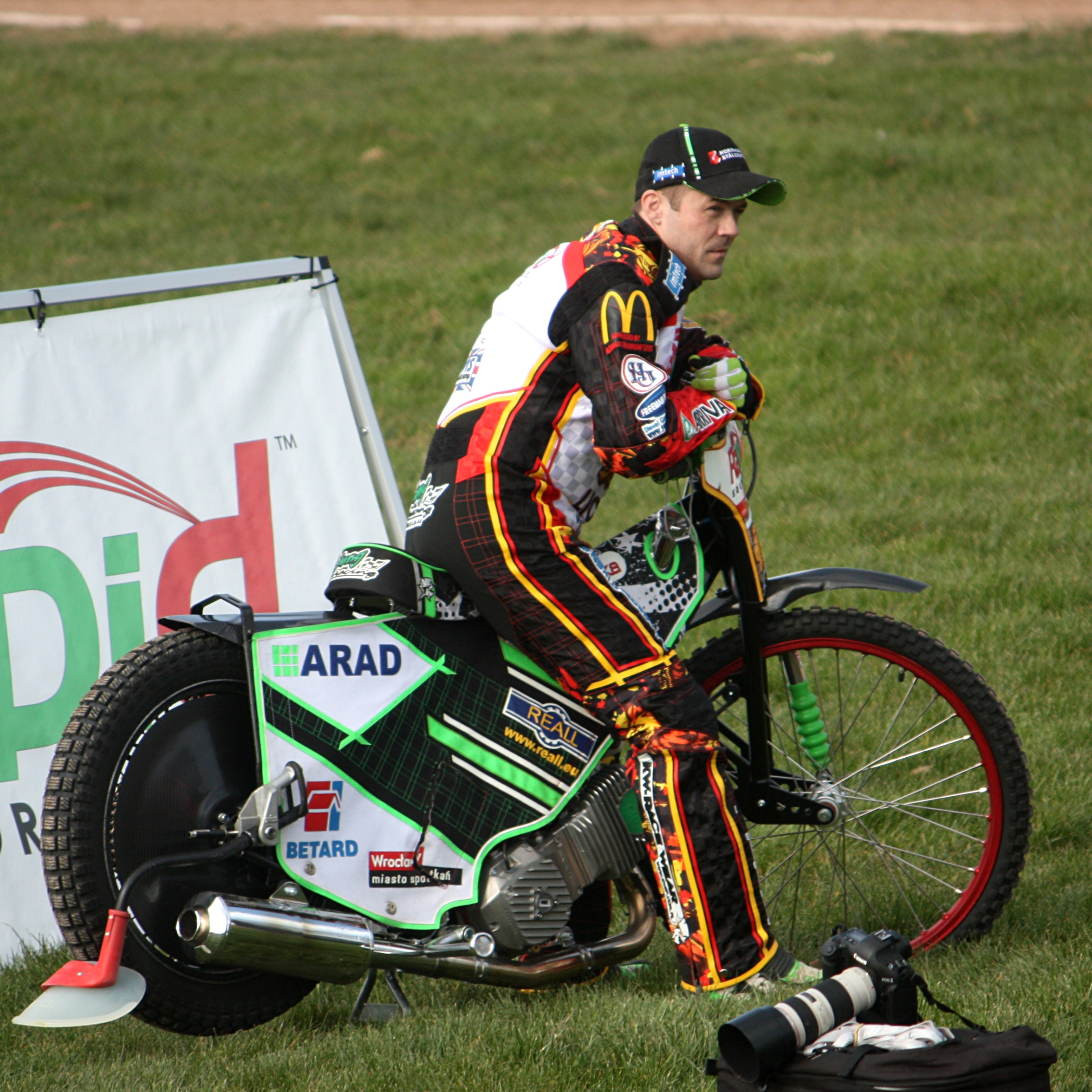
- Born: 30 October 1982 (age 44); Åseda, Sweden
- Nationality: Swedish
- Website: Official website

Career history

Sweden
- 1999–2004: Team Svelux/Luxo Stars
- 2001: Nässjö
- 2002, 2015, 2020–2021: Vetlanda/Njudungarna
- 2005–2014, 2018–2019, 2022, 2024: Västervik
- 2016: Dackarna
- 2023: Piraterna

Denmark
- 2004, 2006: Holsted Tigers
- 2008: Slangerup
- 2021–2022: Region Varde

Poland
- 2004: Gniezno
- 2012: Grudziądz
- 2013: Wrocław
- 2022, 2024: Tarnów

Great Britain
- 2003–2004: Eastbourne Eagles
- 2004, 2005: Swindon Robins
- 2010–2011: Lakeside Hammers
- 2014: Leicester Lions

Speedway Grand Prix statistics
- Starts: 18
- Podiums: 0 (0-0-0)
- Finalist: 0 times

Team honours
- 1999, 2002: Swedish Second Division
- 2003: Speedway World Cup
- 2015: Elitserien League Champion

Anders Peter Mikael Ljung (born 30 October 1982) is a Swedish motorcycle speedway rider. He is a former Speedway Grand Prix participant. He was part of the winning Swedish team in the 2003 Speedway World Team Cup. He earned six caps for the Sweden national speedway team.

== Career ==
Born in Åseda, Sweden, Ljung first had success in his native Sweden, winning the second division championship in 1999 with Team Svelux, going on to win it again in 2002 with Vetlanda. In 2002, he finished as runner up in the Swedish Under-21 final.

Ljung made his debut in British speedway in 2003 with Eastbourne Eagles. The same year, he was part of the victorious Swedish World Cup team. He returned to the Eagles in 2004 and also went on to ride for Swindon Robins later in the season. He returned to the Robins team midway through the 2005 season for a short spell.

Ljung spent several years away from British speedway, returning in 2010 with Lakeside Hammers, and was named in the team for 2011. After getting a Speedway Grand Prix place in 2012, he decided that he could not commit to a season in Britain.

Ljung raced in the 2012 Grand Prix series, finishing in 15th place. He previously got wild cards in 2003 and 2004.

In 2014, Ljung returned to British speedway riding for Leicester Lions in their debut Elite League season.

In the Swedish Speedway Team Championship, Ljung rode for various teams including, Dackarna, Vetlanda, Västervik and Piraterna. In 2024, he began the season with Njudungarna in the Allsvenskan, but was later recruited by Västervik again, to assist them in the Elitserien.
