= Karlstad Speedway =

Swedish motorcycle speedway club

Club information
- Track address: Kalvholmen Motorstadion; 652 21 Karlstad, Sweden
- Country: Sweden
- Founded: 1967
- League: Team Championship (division 1)

Major team honours
Second tier champions	1981, 1982, 1984, 2024
Third tier champions	1976, 1979, 1988, 1995, 2006, 2011

Karlstad Speedway or Solkatterna Speedway (the Sun Cats) is a motorcycle speedway club from Karlstad in Sweden.

== Stadium ==
The city's stadium is the Kalvholmen Motorstadion, a 297-metre track, which is located in the southern Lamberget region of Karlstad.

== History ==
=== Solkatterna ===
The city's first speedway club was Solkatterna (the Sun Cats) which was founded in 1967 and first raced in the Swedish Speedway Team Championship during the 1967 Swedish speedway season in division 3 west.

After a decade of racing in the third tier of Swedish speedway, the team's first honours came during the 1976 Swedish speedway season when they won the third division south. However, they failed to gain promotion after being beaten in the promotion play off, despite the best efforts of Lars Ericsson. A second opportunity arose in 1979, when the team won the division again but this time won the play off.

After finishing second during their first season of second tier speedway in 1980, they won the division in 1981. The main riders that brought the success were Lillebror Johansson, Jan Ericsson and Lars Ericsson but unfortunately the team lost the promotion play off.

In 1982, they won the division again but once more lost the play off. However, they deservedly claimed a place in the top division for the first time because the Elitserien expanded for the 1983 Swedish speedway season. Their first season in the Elitserien ended with relegation but they quickly recovered to gain promotion again in 1984.

Two consecutive season relegations ensued in 1986 and 1987 before the team won division 2 north in 1988 Swedish speedway season.

=== Karlstad ===
For the 1989 season the city's speedway team was known as Karlstad and not Solkatterna. The following season a merger took place as the team competed as Eskilstuna and Karlstad. However, the merger only lasted for one season and the name reverted to Karlstad for the next 12 years. A mediocre period for the team ensued until the 1999 Swedish speedway season, when a change in the league structure saw the introduction of the Allsvenskan, which would form the division below the Elitserien the following season. In 1999 however, it was an additional league competition for teams finishing in the top four of division 1 and Karlstad finished 3rd in it.

=== Return as Solkatterna ===
The name of Solkatterna returned for the 2003 Swedish speedway season but the team initially struggled to perform before gaining promotion to the Allsvenskan for the 2007 Swedish speedway season. The team led by chairman Anders Berglund signed riders such as Stefan Dannö, Daniel Nermark, Kauko Nieminen and Claus Vissing. The team attempted unsuccessfully to make it back to the Elitserien despite a second-place finish in 2009. The team competed until the end of the 2012 Swedish speedway season by which time they were in the third tier of Swedish speedway.

=== Speedway 054 ===
After a ten-year absence the city saw speedway again with a team called Speedway 054. The team competed in the 2022 Swedish speedway season in the third tier, despite a dispute between the promotions of the Speedway 054 and former Solkatterna team.

=== Second return as Solkatterna ===
The team once again rode as Solkatterna during the 2023 Swedish speedway season in the Allsvenskan. The team topped the regular season league table the following season in 2024 and in the play-off final against Griparna, secured the title and recorded a 19-match unbeaten season.

== Notable riders ==
- (Sweden) Jan Ericsson
- (Sweden) Lars Ericsson
- (Sweden) Lillebror Johansson
- (Czech Republic) Toni Kasper
- (Sweden) Daniel Nermark
- (Sweden) Victor Palovaara
