= Tommy Nilsson (speedway rider) =

Swedish speedway rider

- Born: 10 March 1955 (age 71); Uppsala, Sweden
- Nationality: Swedish

Career history

Sweden
- 1971-1986, 1992-1993, 1996: Getingarna
- 1987: Bysarna
- 1988-1989: Stockholm United
- 1990: Dackarna

Great Britain
- 1973: Hackney Hawks
- 1975, 1977: Coventry Bees

Individual honours
- 1983: Swedish Championship

Team honours
- 1977: Speedway World Team Cup finalist
- 1974, 1978, 1979, 1980, 1981: Allsvenskan Champion
- 1982, 1983, 1985, 1989: Elitserien Champion
- 1973: London Cup
- 1977: Midland Cup

Tommy Bernt Erik Nilsson (born 10 March 1955) is a former motorcycle speedway rider from Sweden. He earned 65 caps for the Sweden national speedway team.

== Speedway career ==
Nilsson is a former champion of Sweden, winning the Swedish Championship in 1983. He reached the final of the Speedway World Team Cup in the 1977 Speedway World Team Cup.

In the Swedish Speedway Team Championship, much of Nilsson's career was spent riding for Getingarna.

Nilsson rode in the top tier of British Speedway from 1973 until 1977, riding for Hackney Hawks and Coventry Bees.

== Family ==
Nilsson's son Kim also became a professional speedway rider.

== World Final Appearances ==
=== Individual World Championship ===
- 1977 - (Sweden) Gothenburg, Ullevi - 10th - 6pts

=== World Pairs Championship ===
- 1986 – (West Germany) Pocking, Rottalstadion (with Jan Andersson) - 4th - 32pts (15)

=== World Team Cup ===
- 1977 - (Poland) Wrocław, Olympic Stadium (with Bengt Jansson / Anders Michanek / Sören Karlsson / Bernt Persson) - 4th - 11pts (0)
- 1985 – USA Long Beach, Veterans Memorial Stadium (with Jan Andersson / Jimmy Nilsen / Per Jonsson / Pierre Brannefors) - 4th - 10pts (3)
- 1986 – (Sweden) Gothenburg, Ullevi and (Denmark) Vojens, Speedway Center (with Jimmy Nilsen / Per Jonsson / Jan Andersson / Erik Stenlund / Tony Olsson) - 4th - 73pts (7)
