= Getingarna =

Swedish speedway club

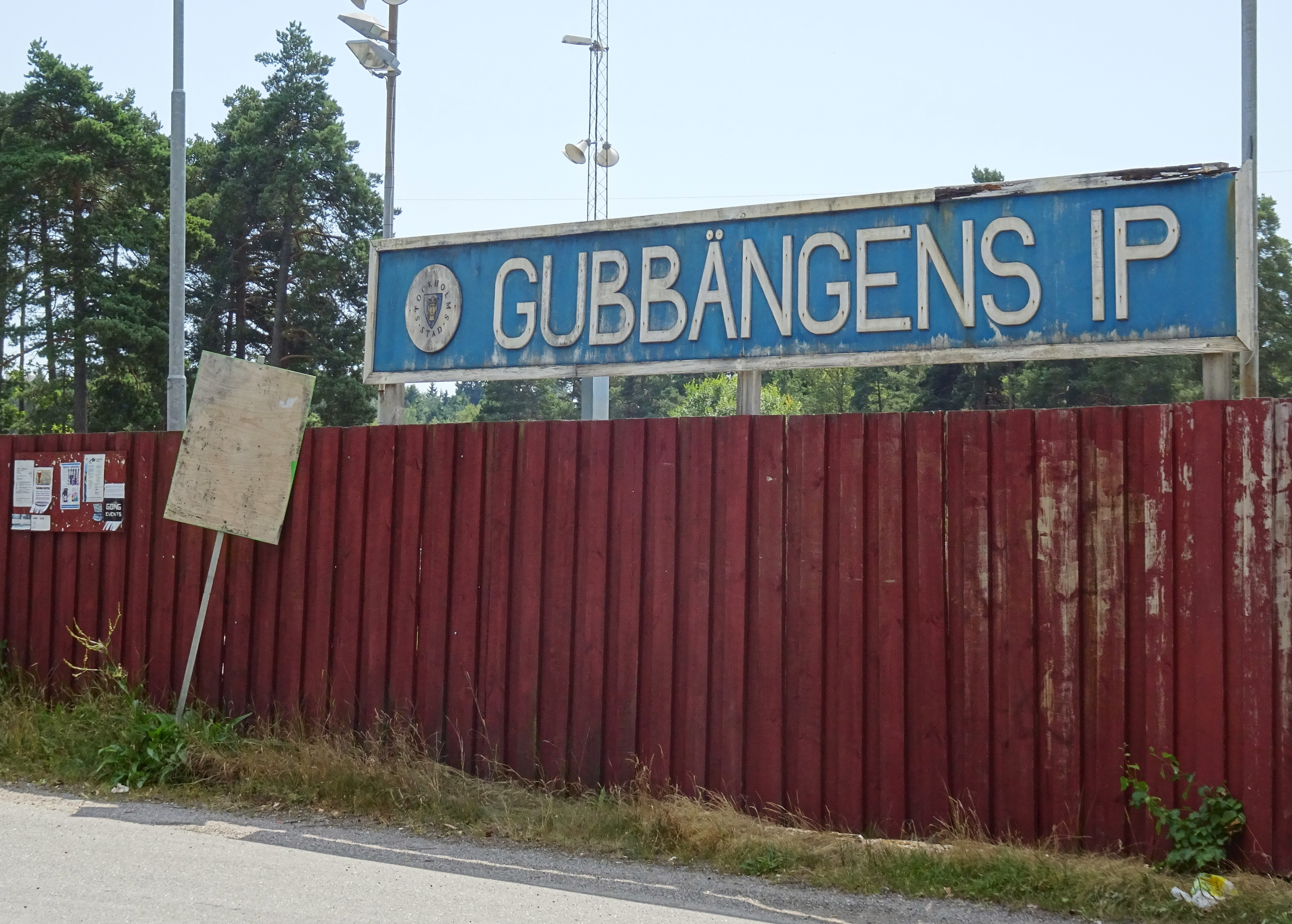

Club information
- Track address: Gubbängens Idrottsplats; Målkurvan 24, 122 45 Enskede
- Country: Sweden
- Founded: 1948
- League: Team Championship

Club facts
- Nickname: The Wasps

Major team honours
League champions	1952, 1963, 1964, 1965, 1966, 1967, 1969, 1974, 1978, 1979, 1980, 1981, 1982, 1983, 1985, 1989
Second Division Champions	1962

Getingarna was a motorcycle speedway club from Stockholm in Sweden. They hold the record for Swedish Championships with 15 league titles to their name.

== History ==
The club's first name was Motorsällskapet and they competed in the very first Swedish speedway season in 1948. They adopted the name Getingarna the following season and rode at the Stockholm Olympic Stadium from 1949 to 1953.

They later rode at the Gubbängens Idrottsplats and would go on to become the most successful speedway club in Sweden by winning 16 championships in 1952, 1963, 1964, 1965, 1966, 1967, 1969, 1974, 1978, 1979, 1980, 1981, 1982, 1983, 1985 and (1989 as Stockholm United).

The club nickname was the Wasps named after a rider called Bertil Andersson. In 1988, the team merged with the club called Gamarna and became Stockholm United. They were called Stockholm United from 1988 to 1990 and won the Championship in 1989.

In 2002, the club ran into financial difficulties and finally closed in 2010. For a short time from 2004 to 2010, the club shared Gubbängens Idrottsplats with Hammarby Speedway. The shale speedway track was demolished in 2016.

== Notable riders ==
- (Sweden) Arne Carlsson
- (Sweden) Leif Enecrona
- (Sweden) Richard Hellsen
- (Sweden) Bengt Jansson
- (Sweden) Per Jonsson
- (Sweden) Sune Karlsson
- (Sweden) Leif Larsson
- (Sweden) Anders Michanek
- (Sweden) Tommy Nilsson
- (Sweden) Göte Nordin
- (Sweden) Erik Stenlund
