= Filbyterna =

Swedish speedway team

Club information
- Track address: Linköping Motorstadion; Linköping
- Country: Sweden
- Founded: 1948
- Closed: 2010

Major team honours
League champions	1948, 1950
second division winners	1960
third division winners	1963, 1968, 1970, 1978, 1983, 1988, 1999
tier 4 winners	2003

Filbyterna were a Swedish motorcycle speedway team based at the old Linköping Motorstadion in Ryd (1948–1977) and the Linköping Motorstadion (1978–2010), near Linköping, Sweden. They were twice champions of Sweden.

== History ==
=== 1948 to 1958 ===
The team were one of the seven inaugural members of the Swedish speedway league, which started during the 1948 Swedish speedway season. Based in Linköping their official name was Linköping MK but they took the nickname Filbyterna.

They won the first league (known as the Dirt Track League) in 1948 and became the first Swedish Speedway Team Championship winners.

In 1950 they won their second team championship. The home track was at the Ryd Motorstadion.

In 1951, the club signed Ove Fundin and he would stay until 1957. He won the first of his five World Championships as a Filbyterna rider in 1956.

=== 1959 to 2000 ===
In 1959, the club competed in the second division for the first time and in 1961 they did not compete at all. The team then spent the next four decades outside of the top division.

In 1978, the club moved to the Linköping Motorstadion. It was in 1978 that they also won the third tier league.

When the Elitserien was introduced in 1982, the team were finishing last in Division 1 north. From 1982 until their demise in 2000 the team's success was to limited to third division wins in 1983, 1988 and 1999.

=== 2003 to present ===
The team returned and won the second division (fourth tier) during the 2003 Swedish speedway season and from 2005 to 2010 competed in division 1. Although they have not competed since 2010, the Linköping Motorstadion track still exists, which provides hope to supporters that the team may return.

== Notable riders ==
- (Sweden) Kjell Carlsson
- (Sweden) Linus Eriksson
- (Sweden) Dan Forsberg
- (Sweden) Ove Fundin
- (Denmark) Nicki Pedersen
- (England) Gary Havelock
- (Poland) Piotr Protasiewicz
- (England) Lee Richardson
