= Piraterna =

Swedish motorcycle speedway team

Club information
- Track address: Motala Arena
- Country: Sweden
- Founded: 1949
- Team manager: Stefan Andersson & Daniel Andersson
- League: Elitserien
- Website: Official website

Club facts
- Nickname: Pirates
- Track size: 291 metres
- Track record time: 55.9 seconds
- Track record date: 7 June 2016
- Track record holder: Jonas Davidsson

Major team honours
Team champions Gold	2011, 2013
Allsvenskan Champions	2003
Second Tier (North) Champions	1980
Third Tier Champions	1973, 1999
Third Tier (South) Champions	1975, 1985

Piraterna are a Swedish motorcycle speedway team based in Motala, Sweden The team are two times champions of Sweden. and compete in the Elitserien

== History ==
=== 1949 to 1951 ===
Piraterna made their league debut during the 1949 Swedish speedway season, finishing 8th in a ten team division. The following season in 1950, the club won their first honours in the newly created division 2. However after 1951, the club would not ride in the league system for 20 years.

=== 1971 to 1999 ===
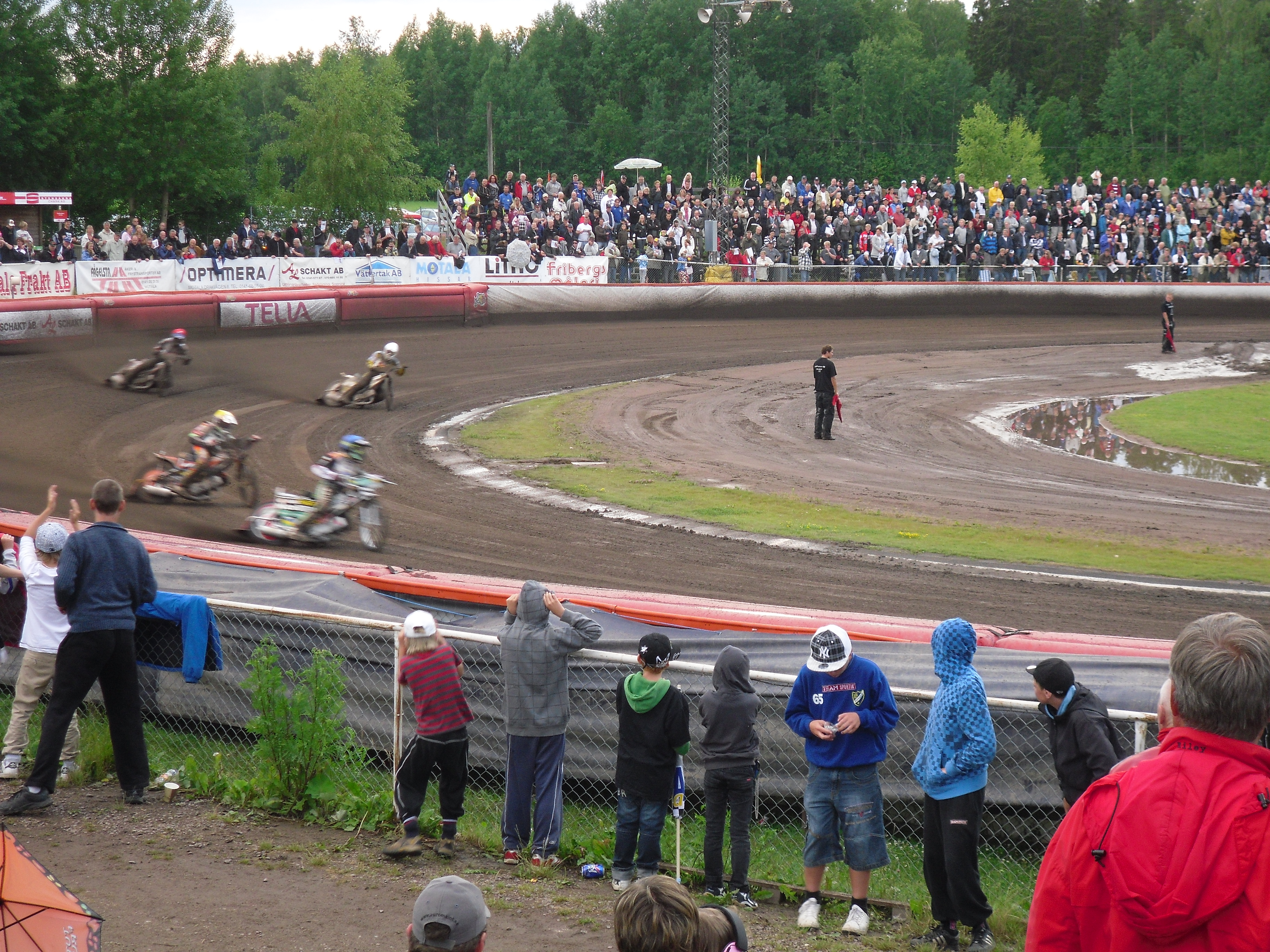
Motala Arena in 2009

In 1971 the team returned to league action competing in division 3, and two years later in 1973 gained promotion to division 2. The club continued to race and despite a division 2 win in 1980 they never competed in the top division, which became the Elitserien in 1982. The team then dropped out of the league in 1997 before returning in 1998 and winning division 2 in 1999.

=== 2000 to present ===
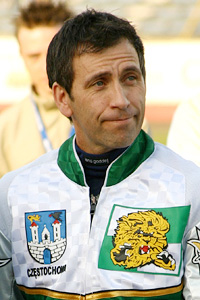
Greg Hancock helped the club win their first Elitserien

Piraterna started the new millennium in the second tier known as the Allsvenskan and in 2003 led by Freddie Lindgren they finally achieved promotion to the Elitserien. In 2006 and 2010, they achieved third place finishes.

In 2011, they had a new look squad that included former world champion Greg Hancock, polish rider Maciej Janowski, and two sets of brothers Piotr Pawlicki Jr., Przemysław Pawlicki, Jonas Davidsson and Daniel Davidsson. The club won their first Swedish Speedway Team Championship after winning the Elitserien title, beating Indianerna 93-87. After a second place finish in 2012, they won a second title in 2013.

In 2017, they were relegated but returned to the Elitserien during the 2019 Swedish speedway season and finished 7th. In 2020 and 2021, the club survived last place finishes because The Allsvenskan (second-tier league) was not held due to the COVID-19 pandemic and Vetlanda went bankrupt.

During the 2023 Swedish speedway season, the club performed much better, taking third place in the regular season table but in 2025 once again finished bottom of the table.

== Season summary ==
=== Previous teams ===
Extended content

2015 team

- (Sweden) Jonas Davidsson
- (Australia) Chris Holder
- (United States) Greg Hancock
- (Poland) Piotr Pawlicki
- (Australia) Darcy Ward
- (Russia) Vadim Tarasenko
- (Denmark) Bjarne Pedersen
- (Sweden) Alexander Johansson
- (Sweden) Dennis Jonsson

2022 team

- (Poland) Oskar Fajfer
- (Czech Republic) Václav Milík Jr.
- (Denmark) Jonas Seifert-Salk
- (Poland) Piotr Pawlicki Jr.
- (United States) Luke Becker
- (Sweden) Rasmus Brodberg
- (Sweden) Alexander Liljekvist
- (Poland) Jakub Jamróg
- (Poland) Grzegorz Walasek
- (Sweden) Jonathan Ejnermark
- (Poland) Adam Fajfer
- (Poland) Marcin Nowak
- (Sweden) Thomas H. Jonasson
- (Poland) Mateusz Szczepaniak

== Notable riders ==
- (Sweden) Daniel Davidsson
- (Sweden) Jonas Davidsson
- (United States) Greg Hancock
- (Poland) Maciej Janowski
- (Sweden) Freddie Lindgren
- (Sweden) Mikael Max
- (Poland) Piotr Pawlicki Jr.
- (Poland) Przemysław Pawlicki
- (Slovenia) Matej Žagar
