= Allsvenskan (speedway) =

Swedish motorcycle speedway tier two league

- Sport: Speedway
- Founded: 1948
- No. of teams: 6
- Country: Sweden
- Most recent champion: 2025 - Örnarna
- 2026

Notes
- League above Elitserien League below Division One

Allsvenskan (literally, "The National League") is the second tier in the league system of Speedway in Sweden and currently comprises six motorcycle speedway teams.

Until the introduction of the Elitserien in 1982 the Allsvenskan was the highest level of Swedish Speedway.

== 2026 clubs ==
Team	City	County or län	Founded	Stadium	Nickname
Griparna	Nyköping	Södermanland County	1949	Nyköpings Motorstadion	The Grippers
Masarna	Avesta	Dalarna County	1937	Avesta Motorstadion	
Njudungarna	Vetlanda	Jönköping County	1946	Vetlanda Motorstadion	
Örnarna	Mariestad	Västra Götaland County	1949	Grevby Motorstadion	The Eagles
Solkatterna	Karlstad	Värmland County	1967	Kalvholmen Motorbana	The Sun Cats
Valsarna	Hagfors	Värmland County	1967	Tallhult Motorstadion	The Waltzes/Rollers

== History ==
From the start of Swedish league speedway in 1948 until 1981 the Allsvenskan was the top speedway league in Sweden. But in 1982 the Elitserien was formed and the Allsvenskan became the second level of Swedish speedway. Speedway meetings in Sweden are normally held between May and September. The teams are generally known by nicknames rather than club or city names. These nicknames usually have some sort of local connection.

== Rules ==
As with the Elitserien and the Speedway Elite League in the UK, the top four teams at the end of each season compete in the playoffs in semi-finals and a final. The winner of the final are crowned the champions and are often promoted to the Elitserien, although teams sometimes decline that opportunity.

== Team selection ==
Unlike in British speedway the Swedish leagues have a squad from which the choose 7 riders for each meeting. The two riders with the lowest consecutive match average must be placed as reserves in jackets number 6 and 7.

== See also ==
- motorcycle speedway
- Swedish Speedway Team Championship
