= Västervik Speedway =

Swedish motorcycle speedway team

Club information
- Track address: Hejla Arena; Västervik
- Country: Sweden
- Founded: 1966
- Team manager: Morgan Andersson
- Team captain: Robert Lambert
- League: Elitserien
- Website: Official Website

Club facts
- Colours: Blue and yellow
- Track size: 296m
- Track record time: 55.1 seconds
- Track record date: 20 August 2018
- Track record holder: Nicki Pedersen

Major team honours
Elitserien Champions	2005, 2025
Second Tier Champions	1977, 1979, 1990
Division Two (South) Champions	1986

Västervik Speedway are a motorcycle speedway team from Västervik in Sweden. They ride in the Elitserien and twice champions of Sweden. The team race at the Ljungheden also known as the Helja Arena.

== History ==
=== 1966 to 1981 ===
They were established as Skepparna and raced in division 3 during the 1966 Swedish speedway season. In 1977 the team won their first honours when winning division 2 and were promoted to the top tier for the first time. However, in 1978 the team struggled and were subsequently relegated before signing Bengt Jansson and winning division 2 again in 1979. With the addition of Tommy Johansson the team survived the 1980 and 1981 seasons.

=== 1982 to 1992 ===
The club were put in the second tier, on the introduction of the Elitserien in 1982. In 1986 the team won division 2 and backed up this success in 1990 by winning division 1, which resulted in their return to the top tier for the first time since 1981. They have raced in the Elitserien (the top league division of Swedish speedway) ever since.

=== 1993 to 2004 ===
In 1993, the team changed their name to Västervik and signed Sam Ermolenko (who would become the world champion that year). The team finished third for their highest ever position. The team continued to compete in the Elitserien finishing third again in 2001 after signing Tomasz Gollob and Nicki Pedersen.

=== 2005 to present ===
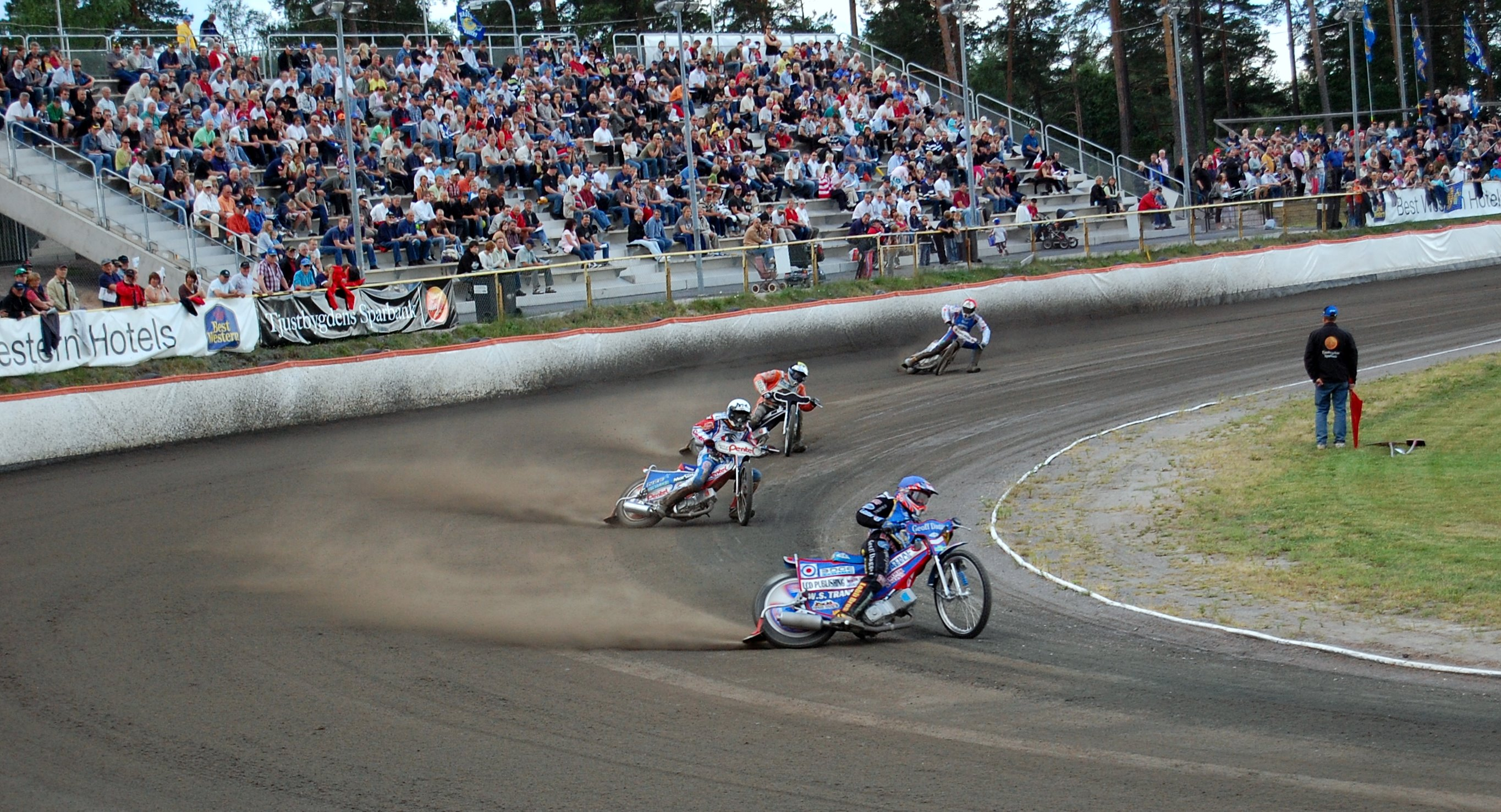
Action from Ljungheden against Indianerna during the 2007 season

During the 2005 Swedish speedway season the club won their first Swedish Team Championship with a team that included Tomasz Gollob, Jacek Gollob, Bjarne Pedersen and Niels Kristian Iversen. They then narrowly lost the title after finishing runners-up to Dackarna in 2007. In 2014, the club were relegated but won two Allsvenskan titles in 2016 and 2017, which took them back to the Elitserien.

In 2023, the team signed three times world champion Tai Woffinden.

On 23 September 2025, the team won its second Swedish Championship, by defeating Smederna, 85–83 in the Swedish Championship Finals.

== Notable riders ==
- (Australia) Craig Boyce
- (Australia) Jason Doyle
- (United States) Sam Ermolenko
- (Poland) Jacek Gollob
- (Poland) Tomasz Gollob
- (Denmark) Niels Kristian Iversen
- (Sweden) Bengt Jansson
- (Sweden) Jörgen Johansson
- (Sweden) Tommy Johansson
- (England) Robert Lambert
- (Sweden) Freddie Lindgren
- (Denmark) Bjarne Pedersen
- (Denmark) Nicki Pedersen
- (Australia) Todd Wiltshire
- (England) Tai Woffinden
