= 1953 Swedish speedway season =

Motorcycle racing competition

The 1953 Swedish speedway season was the 1953 season of motorcycle speedway in Sweden.

== Individual ==
=== Individual Championship ===
The 1953 Swedish Individual Speedway Championship final was held on 2 October in Stockholm. Göran Norlén won the Swedish Championship.

Pos.	Rider	Club	Points
1	Göran Norlén	Kaparna	15
2	Bert Lindarw	Smederna	13
3	Olle Heyman	Monarkerna	10+3
4	Göte Olsson	Indianerna	10+2
5	Rune Sörmander	Dackarna	10+1
6	Per Tage Svensson	Filbyterna	9
7	Georg Duneborn	Getingarna	8
8	Joel Jansson	Smederna	7
9	Stig Pramberg	Vargarna	7
10	Birger Forsberg	Monarkerna	6
11	Kjell Carlsson	Kaparna	6
12	Bernt Nilsson	Monarkerna	5
13	Lars Pettersson	Indianerna	4
14	Olle Segerström	Smederna	3
15	Sven Fahlén	Monarkerna	2
16	Dan Forsberg (res)	Vargarna	1
17	Sune Karlsson	Getingarna	0

== Team ==
=== Team Championship ===
Vargarna won division 1 and were declared the winners of the Swedish Speedway Team Championship.

Vikingarna won division 2.

There were just 11 teams for the 1953 season following the demise of three teams; Knallarna, Garvarna and Kavaljererna.

Div 1
Pos	Team	Pts
1	Vargarna	25
2	Indianerna	18
3	Smederna	16
4	Monarkerna	14
5	Getingarna	13
6	Kaparna	12
7	Filbyterna	10
8	Dackarna	4

Div 2
Pos	Team	Pts
1	Vikingarna	6
2	Kuggarna	6
3	Stenbockarna	0

== See also ==
- Speedway in Sweden
