= 1951 Swedish speedway season =

Motorcycle racing competition

The 1951 Swedish speedway season was the 1951 season of motorcycle speedway in Sweden.

== Individual ==
=== Individual Championship ===
The 1951 Swedish Individual Speedway Championship final was held on 12 October in Stockholm. Helge Brinkeback won the Swedish Championship for the second consecutive year.

Pos.	Rider	Club	Total
1	Helge Brinkeback	Vargarna	15
2	Göte Olsson	Indianerna	13+3
3	Sune Karlsson	Getingarna	13+2
4	Joel Jansson	Smederna	11
5	Gunnar Karlsson	Vargarna	9
6	Bert Lindarw	Smederna	9
7	Einar Lindqvist	Vargarna	9
8	Dan Forsberg	Vargarna	8
9	Bo Andersson	Getingarna	6
10	Lennart Carlström	Vargarna	6
11	Rune Gustafsson	Munkarna	5
12	Lars Thaung	Dackarna	5
13	Olle Segerström	Smederna	4
14	Lennart Eriksson	Smederna	3
15	Bengt Gustafsson	Dackarna	3
16	Lars-Erik Österberg	Dackarna	1

== Team ==
=== Team Championship ===
Vargarna won division 1 and were declared the winners of the Swedish Speedway Team Championship. The team included Dan Forsberg, Helge Brinkeback and Olle Nygren.

Vikingarna won division 2 east and Kaparna won division 2 west.

Div 1
Pos	Team	Pts
1	Vargarna	22
2	Smederna	14
3	Dackarna	12
4	Filbyterna	11
5	Indianerna	10
6	Getingarna	8
7	Monarkerna	7

Div 2 East
Pos	Team	Pts
1	Vikingarna	18
2	Piraterna	16
3	Folkare	9
4	Vesslorna	8
5	Kuggarna	6
6	Munkarna	3

Div 2 West
Pos	Team	Pts
1	Kaparna	16
2	Kanonerna	12
3	Falkarna	12
4	Saxarna	10
5	Hyllingarna	8
6	Solkatterna	2

== See also ==
- Speedway in Sweden
