= 1954 Swedish speedway season =

Motorcycle racing competition

The 1954 Swedish speedway season was the 1954 season of motorcycle speedway in Sweden.

== Individual ==
=== Individual Championship ===
The 1954 Swedish Individual Speedway Championship final was due to be held during October in Stockholm but was not staged following continual weather problems. Qualifying was supposed to have been over six rounds but only four were completed due to rain and the final was also cancelled due to rain.

Leading qualifying scores at time of cancellation

Pos.	Rider	Club	Pts
	Rune Sörmander	Dackarna	15+15
	Olle Nygren	Monakerna	14+15
	Lars Pettersson	Indianerna	14+10
	Göran Norlén	Kaparna	10+14
	Sune Karlsson	Getingarna	13+10
	Per Tage Svensson	Filbyterna	9+13
	Ulf Ericsson	Vargarna	9+11
	Bernt Nilsson	Monakerna	8+12
	Göte Olsson	Indianerna	10+9
	Dan Forsberg	Vargarna	7+10
	Gunnar Johansson	Filbyterna	11+5
	Bert Lindarw	Smederna	15
	Sven Fahlén	Monakerna	7+8
	Evert Andersson	Dackarna	5+9
	Rune Claesson	Kaparna	8+6
	Kjell Carlsson	Kaparna	12

== Team ==
=== Team Championship ===
Vargarna won division 1 for the fourth time in six years and were declared the winners of the Swedish Speedway Team Championship.

Their team included riders such as Dan Forsberg, Stig Pramberg and Per Olof Söderman.

The league consisted of just one division of ten teams following the demise of Kuggarna and Stenbockarna.

Pos	Team	Pts
1	Vargarna	26
2	Monarkerna	22
3	Indianerna	20
4	Smederna	18
5	Kaparna	16
6	Filbyterna	15
7	Getingarna	12
8	Dackarna	12
9	Vikingarna	2
