= 1957 Swedish speedway season =

Motorcycle racing competition

The 1957 Swedish speedway season was the 1957 season of motorcycle speedway in Sweden.

== Individual ==
=== Individual Championship ===
The 1957 Swedish Individual Speedway Championship final was held on 11 October in Stockholm. Ove Fundin won the Swedish Championship for the second consecutive year.

Pos.	Rider	Club	Total
1	Ove Fundin	Filbyterna	14+3
2	Per Olof Söderman	Filbyterna	14+2
3	Rune Sörmander	Dackarna	14+1
4	Göte Nordin	Getingarna	11
5	Bernt Nilsson	Monarkerna	10
6	Dan Forsberg	Dackarna	9
7	Olle Segerström	Kaparna	8
8	Arne Carlsson	Kaparna	8
9	Kaj Forsberg	Getingarna	7
10	Thorvald Karlsson	Dackarna	6
11	Bengt Eriksson	Getingarna	6
12	Joel Jansson (res)	Vargarna	4
13	Thorsten Carlsson	Filbyterna	3
14	Olle Andersson	Indianerna	1
15	Roger Forsberg	Kaparna	1
16	Alf Jonsson	Dackarna	1
17	Goran Norlen	Kaparna	0

== Team ==
=== Team Championship ===
Dackarna won division 1 and were declared the winners of the Swedish Speedway Team Championship for the first time. The team included Rune Sörmander and Dan Forsberg.

The league increased to seven teams following the return of Vargarna, who had missed the previous two seasons due to financial issues.

Pos	Team	Pts
1	Dackarna	22
2	Kaparna	16
3	Monarkerna	14
4	Filbyterna	13
5	Indianerna	8
6	Getingarna	7
7	Vargarna	4

== See also ==
- Speedway in Sweden
