= 1955 Swedish speedway season =

Motorcycle racing competition

The 1955 Swedish speedway season was the 1955 season of motorcycle speedway in Sweden.

== Individual ==
=== Individual Championship ===
The 1955 Swedish Individual Speedway Championship final was held on 30 September in Stockholm. Rune Sörmander won the Swedish Championship.

Pos.	Rider	Club	Total
1	Rune Sormander	Dackarna	15
2	Olle Nygren	Monarkerna	14
3	Ove Fundin	Filbyterna	12+3
4	Kjell Carlsson	Kaparna	12+2
5	Dan Forsberg	Filbyterna	10
6	Ulf Ericsson	Monarkerna	10
7	Joel Jansson	Indianerna	7
8	Birger Forsberg	Monarkerna	5
9	Per Olof Soderman	Getingarna	5
10	Stig Pramberg	Filbyterna	5
11	Evert Andersson	Dackarna	5
12	Georg Duneborn	Getingarna	5
13	Allan Nilsson	Dackarna	4
14	Sven Fahlén	Dackarna	3
15	Göran Norlén	Kaparna	2
16	Rune Stenström	Getingarna	1
17	Bernt Nilsson (res)	Monarkerna	1

== Team ==
=== Team Championship ===
Monarkerna won division 1 and were declared the winners of the Swedish Speedway Team Championship.

The 1955 season proved to be a low point in terms of league teams. Only six teams lined up compared to 21 teams that competed just five years earlier in 1950. Vargarna, Smederna and Vikingarna did not compete.

Pos	Team	Pts
1	Monarkerna	18
2	Kaparna	13
3	Filbyterna	10
4	Dackarna	10
5	Indianerna	5
6	Getingarna	4
