= 1959 Swedish speedway season =

Motorcycle racing competition

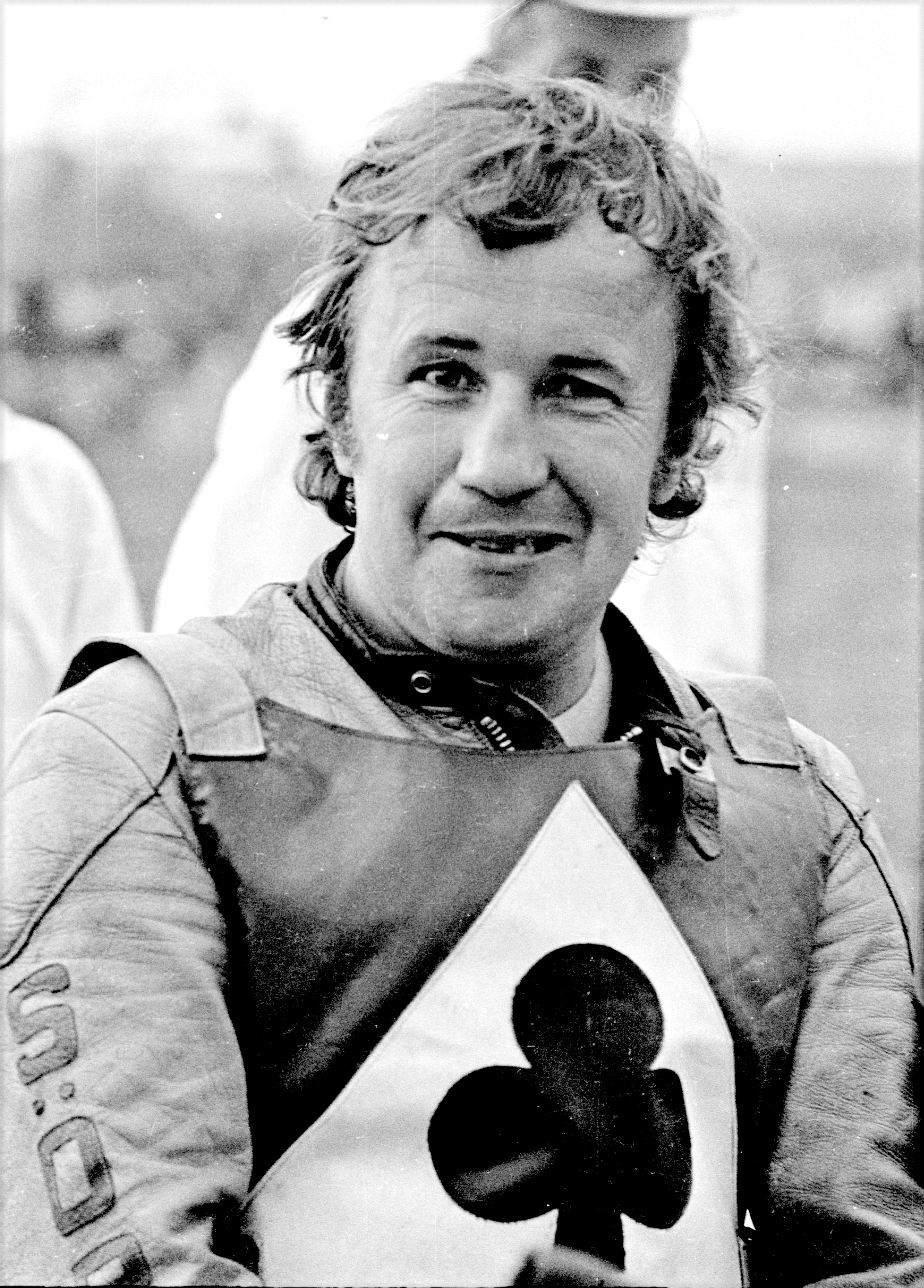
- Sören Sjösten was the 1959 Junior champion

The 1959 Swedish speedway season was the 1959 season of motorcycle speedway in Sweden.

== Individual ==
=== Individual Championship ===
The 1959 Swedish Individual Speedway Championship final was held on 25 September in Gothenburg. Rune Sörmander won the Swedish Championship for the third time.

Pos.	Rider	Club	Total
1	Rune Sörmander	Dackarna	15
2	Ove Fundin	Kaparna	14
3	Olle Nygren	Monarkerna	13
4	Evert Andersson	Dackarna	11
5	Arne Carlsson	Kaparna	10
6	Ulf Ericsson	Monarkerna	7
7	Göran Carlsson	Kaparna	7
8	Allan Nilsson	Dackarna	7
9	Per-Tage Svensson	Vargarna	7
10	Kjell Wårenius	Monarkerna	6
11	Hans Hallberg	Getingarna	4
12	Stig Pramberg	Vargarna	4
13	Alf Jonsson	Dackarna	4
14	Olle Segerström	Kaparna	4
15	Åke Andersson	Dackarna	3
16	Sören Sjösten	Folkare	2
17	Joel Jansson (res)	Vargarna	1

=== Swedish Junior Championship ===
Winner - Sören Sjösten

== Team ==
=== Team Championship ===
Dackarna won division 1 and were declared the winners of the Swedish Speedway Team Championship for the third consecutive year. Leading the way once again for the successful Dackarna team was the three times Swedish champion Rune Sörmander.

Folkare won the second division. Älgarna joined the league for the season.

Div 1
Pos	Team	Pts
1	Dackarna	14
2	Kaparna	10
3	Monarkerna	8
4	Vargarna	7
5	Getingarna	1

Div 2
Pos	Team	Pts
1	Folkare	12
2	Dackarna B	12
3	Filbyterna	9
4	Älgarna	9
5	Örnarna	8

== See also ==
- Speedway in Sweden
