= 1961 Swedish speedway season =

Motorcycle racing competition

The 1961 Swedish speedway season was the 1961 season of motorcycle speedway in Sweden.

== Individual ==
=== Individual Championship ===
The 1961 Swedish Individual Speedway Championship final was held on 22 September in Stockholm. Björn Knutson won the Swedish Championship.

Pos.	Rider	Club	Total
1	Björn Knutson	Vargarna	15
2	Leif Larsson	Monarkerna	13
3	Rune Sörmander	Dackarna	12
4	Ove Fundin	Kaparna	11
5	Per-Tage Svensson	Vargarna	10
6	Evert Andersson	Dackarna	10
7	Bernt Nilsson	Monarkerna	8
8	Hans Hallberg	Getingarna	8
9	Curt Eldh	Vargarna	7
10	Arne Carlsson	Kaparna	7
11	Sören Sjösten	Vargarna	6
12	Joel Jansson	Vargarna	5
13	Bengt Brannefors	Kaparna	3
14	Åke Andersson	Dackarna	2
15	Inge Gustavsson	Dackarna	2
16	Göran Norlén	Monarkerna	1
17	Thorvald Karlsson	Dackarna	0

=== Swedish Junior Championship ===
Winner - Willihard Thomsson

== Team ==
=== Team Championship ===
Vargarna won division 1 and were declared the winners of the Swedish Speedway Team Championship for the sixth time.

The Vargarna team contained Björn Knutson, Joel Jansson, Sören Sjösten and Per-Tage Svensson.

With 14 teams lining up for the 1961 season the second division was split into a north and south competition. Folkare won the second division north and Kaparna B won the second division south. Älgarna changed their name to Gävle.

Div 1
Pos	Team	Pts
1	Vargarna	12
2	Kaparna	10
3	Dackarna	8
4	Monarkerna	8
5	Getingarna	5

Div 2 N
Pos	Team	Pts
1	Kaparna B	10
2	Njudungarna	9
3	Dackarna B	5
4	Vikingarna	0

Div 2 S
Pos	Team	Pts
1	Folkare	10
2	Vargarna B	8
3	Örnarna	7
4	Gävle	5
5	Taxarna	0

== See also ==
- Speedway in Sweden
