= 1958 Swedish speedway season =

Motorcycle racing competition

The 1958 Swedish speedway season was the 1958 season of motorcycle speedway in Sweden.

== Individual ==
=== Individual Championship ===
The 1958 Swedish Individual Speedway Championship final was held on 3 October in Stockholm. Rune Sörmander won the Swedish Championship for the second time.

Pos.	Rider	Club	Total
1	Rune Sörmander	Dackarna	15
2	Olle Nygren	Monarkerna	13+3
3	Ove Fundin	Kaparna	13+2
4	Per-Olof Söderman	Vargarna	11
5	Joel Jansson	Vargarna	9
6	Allan Nilsson	Dackarna	8
7	Bert Lindarw	Vargarna	8
8	Rune Claesson	Filbyterna	6
9	Göran Norlén	Monarkerna	6
10	Bernt Nilsson	Monarkerna	6
11	Alf Jonsson	Dackarna	6
12	Thorvald Karlsson	Dackarna	5
13	Olle Andersson II	Filbyterna	5
14	Björn Knutson	Vargarna	5
15	Olle Segerström	Vargarna	3
16	Per-Tage Svensson	Filbyterna	1
17	Bengt Eriksson	Getingarna	0
18	Göte Nordin	Getingarna	dns

=== Junior Championship ===
The 1958 season saw the introduction of the first edition of the Junior Championship. The event was won by Agnar Stenlund.

== Team ==
=== Team Championship ===
Dackarna won division 1 for the second consecutive season and were declared the winners of the Swedish Speedway Team Championship. The team retained the 1957 Championship winning rider and Swedish champion Rune Sörmander.

The league increased to two divisions and ten teams following the admission of Örnarna and Folkare and the addition of two B sides in Filbyterna and Dackarna.

Örnarna won the second division.

Div 1
Pos	Team	Pts
1	Dackarna	14
2	Monarkerna	14
3	Kaparna	10
4	Filbyterna	10
5	Vargarna	6
6	Getingarna	2

Div 2
Pos	Team	Pts
1	Örnarna	12
2	Filbyterna B	10.5
3	Dackarna B	10.5
4	Folkare	7

== See also ==
- Speedway in Sweden
