= 1963 Swedish speedway season =

Motorcycle racing competition

The 1963 Swedish speedway season was the 1963 season of motorcycle speedway in Sweden.

== Individual ==
=== Individual Championship ===
The 1963 Swedish Individual Speedway Championship final was held on 4 October in Stockholm. Björn Knutson won the Swedish Championship for the second time.

Pos.	Rider	Club	Total
1	Björn Knutson	Vargarna	15
2	Göte Nordin	Getingarna	14
3	Sören Sjösten	Vargarna	13
4	Ove Fundin	Kaparna	12
5	Per-Olof Söderman	Vargarna	10
6	Olle Nygren	Vargarna	9
7	Bernt Nilsson	Getingarna	9
8	Bengt Jansson	Getingarna	6
9	Leif Larsson	Getingarna	6
10	Per-Tage Svensson	Dackarna	6
11	Sven Sigurd	Örnarna	5
12	Inge Gustafsson	Dackarna	5
13	Arne Carlsson	Getingarna	4
14	Willihard Thomsson	Monarkerna	3
15	Åke Andersson	Dackarna	1
16	Kjell Svensson (res)	Monarkerna	1
17	Leif Enecrona	Gamarna	0
18	Rune Sörmander	Dackarna	dns

=== Swedish Junior Championship ===
Winner - Bengt Ederlöv

== Team ==
=== Team Championship ===
Getingarna won division 1 and were declared the winners of the Swedish Speedway Team Championship for the second time. The Getingarna team contained Göte Nordin and Bengt Jansson.

With 18 teams declaring their intention to compete for the 1963 season it was decided to form four divisions.

Örnarna won the second division, while Filbyterna and Dackarna B won the third division north and south respectively.

Div 1
Pos	Team	Pts
1	Getingarna	13
2	Vargarna	10
3	Kaparna	10
4	Dackarna	7
5	Monarkerna	0

Div 2
Pos	Team	Pts
1	Örnarna	20
2	Njudungarna	20
3	Folkare	2
4	Gamarna	2
5	Indianerna	2

Div 3 S
Pos	Team	Pts
1	Dackarna B	11
2	Kaparna B	9
3	Njudungarna B	4
4	Smålands Lejon	0

Div 3 N
Pos	Team	Pts
1	Filbyterna	11
2	Smederna	7
3	Taxarna	4
4	Rospiggarna	2

== See also ==
- Speedway in Sweden
