= 1960 Swedish speedway season =

Motorcycle racing competition

The 1960 Swedish speedway season was the 1960 season of motorcycle speedway in Sweden.

== Individual ==
=== Individual Championship ===
The 1960 Swedish Individual Speedway Championship final was held on 30 September in Stockholm. Ove Fundin won the Swedish Championship for the third time.

Pos.	Rider	Club	Total
1	Ove Fundin	Kaparna	15
2	Björn Knutson	Vargarna	14
3	Curt Nyqvist	Monarkerna	13
4	Olle Nygren	Vargarna	12
5	Rune Sörmander	Dackarna	10
6	Per-Tage Svensson	Vargarna	9
7	Hans Hallberg	Getingarna	8
8	Joel Jansson	Vargarna	7
9	Göran Carlsson	Kaparna	7
10	Åke Andersson	Dackarna	7
11	Olle Segerström	Kaparna	5
12	Thorvald Karlsson	Dackarna	4
13	Göte Nordin	Ge]tingarna	3
14	Curt Eldh	Vargarna	3
15	Bernt Nilsson	Monarkerna	1
16	Agnar Stenlund	Getingarna	0
17	Leif Larsson (res)	Monarkerna	0

=== Swedish Junior Championship ===
Winner - Willihard Thomsson

== Team ==
=== Team Championship ===
Vargarna won division 1 and were declared the winners of the Swedish Speedway Team Championship for the fifth time. The Vargarna team contained Olle Nygren, Joel Jansson, Björn Knutson and Per-Tage Svensson.

Filbyterna won the second division. Älgarna did not compete during 1960.

Div 1
Pos	Team	Pts
1	Vargarna	16
2	Monarkerna	10
3	Dackarna	8
4	Kaparna	6
5	Getingarna	0

Div 2
Pos	Team	Pts
1	Filbyterna	13
2	Örnarna	11.5
3	Dackarna B	8
4	Folkare	7.5

== See also ==
- Speedway in Sweden
