= 2007 Swedish speedway season =

Motorcycle racing competition

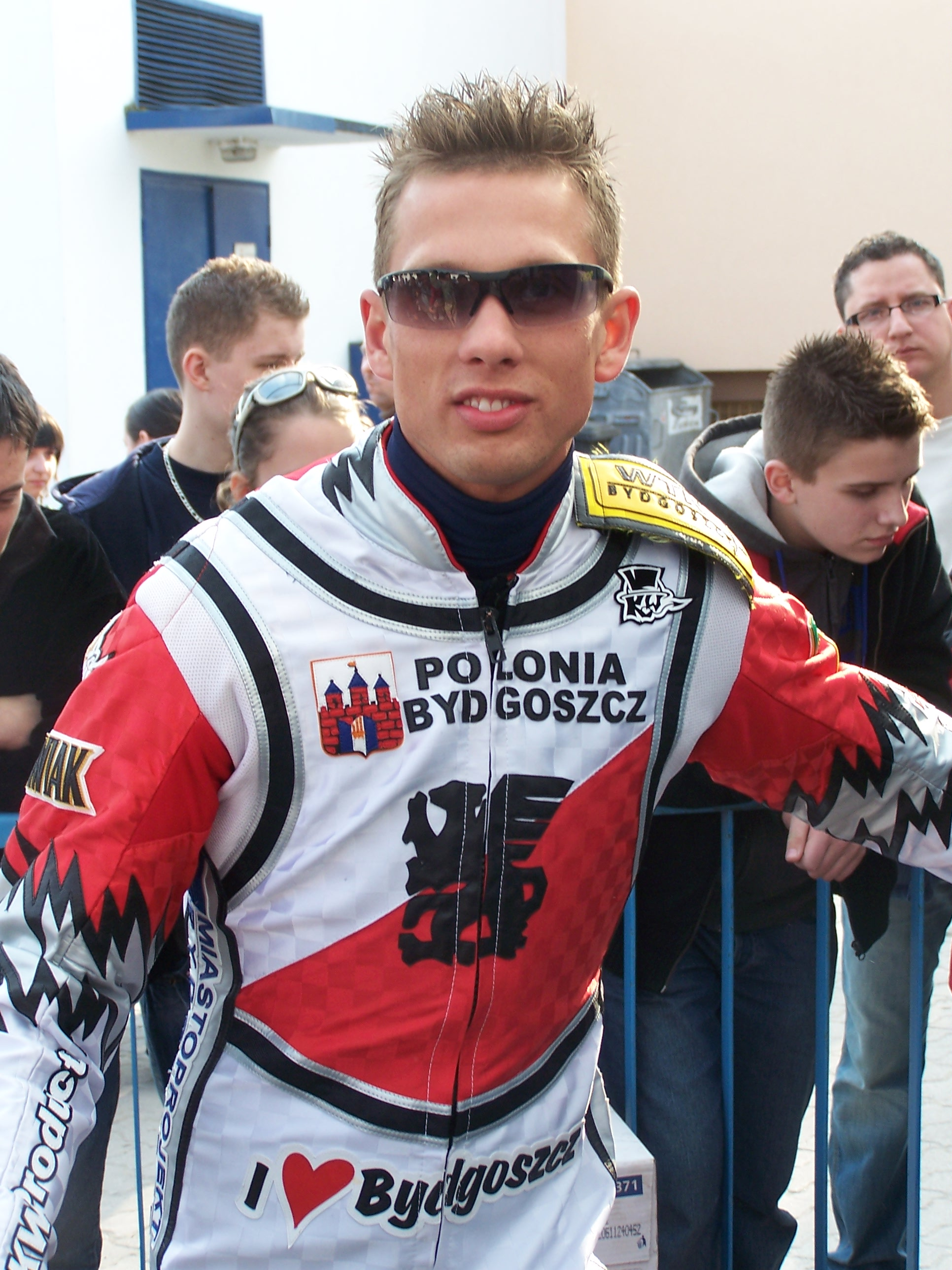
- Andreas Jonsson won his second Swedish title.

The 2007 Swedish speedway season was the 2007 season of motorcycle speedway in Sweden.

== Individual ==
=== Individual Championship ===
The 2007 Swedish Individual Speedway Championship final was held at the Kumla Motorstadion in Kumla on 1 September. Andreas Jonsson won the Swedish Championship for the second time.

Pos	Rider	Team	Pts	Total	SF1	SF2	Final
1	Andreas Jonsson	Dackarna	(2,3,3,3,2)	13	1	3	3
2	Jonas Davidsson	Rospiggarna	(2,3,3,2,3)	13	2	x	2
3	Peter Karlsson	Dackarna	(3,2,3,3,3)	14	x	x	1
4	Mikael Max	Piraterna	(3,3,2,3,2)	13	3	x	0
5	Magnus Zetterström	Indianerna	(3,2,2,2,2)	11	x	2	
6	Freddie Lindgren	Dackarna	(r,r,1,3,3)	7	x	1	
7	Niklas Klingberg	Örnarna	(3,3,0,1,3)	10	x	0	
8	Robert Eriksson	Valsarna	(2,1,1,1,2)	7			
9	Andreas Messing (res)	Rospiggarna	(3,2,1)	6			
10	Peter Ljung	Vetlanda	(0,2,2,2,0)	6			
11	Freddie Eriksson	Griparna	(1,2,1,0,1)	5			
12	Simon Gustafsson	Kumla	(0,0,2,1,1)	4			
13	Andreas Bergstrom	Vargarna	(2,1,0,1,0)	4			
14	Kim Nilsson	Hammarby	(1,1,0,0,1)	3			
15	Andreas Lekander	Griparna	(1,0,1,0,0)	2			
16	David Ruud	Lejonen	(0,1,f,-,-)	1			
17	Thomas H. Jonasson	Vetlanda	(1,r,x,-,-)	1			

Key

- points per race - 3 for a heat win, 2 for 2nd, 1 for third, 0 for last
- r - retired
- t - tape touching excluded
- u - fell

=== U21 Championship ===
Robert Pettersson won the U21 championship.

== Team ==
=== Team Championship ===
Dackarna won the Elitserien and were declared the winners of the Swedish Speedway Team Championship for the fifth time, but first since 1962. The Dackarna team included Andreas Jonsson, Freddie Lindgren, Hans Andersen and Peter Karlsson.

Lejonen won the Allsvenskan.

Elitserien
Pos	Team	Pts
1	Västervik	40
2	Hammarby	35
3	Dackarna	31
4	Vetlanda	28
5	Masarna	26
6	Piraterna	25
7	Rospiggarna	23
8	Smederna	8
9	Kaparna	5
10	Indianerna	4

Allsvenskan
Pos	Team	Pts
1	Lejonen	21
2	Vargarna	19
3	Valsarna	19
4	Solkatterna	16
5	Griparna	12
6	Örnarna	12
7	Team Dalakraft	10
8	Team Bikab	3

Play offs

Elitserien
Stage	Team	Team	Agg Score
QF	Dackarna	Piraterna	108:93
QF	Vetlanda	Masarna	101:91
SF	Dackarna	Hammarby	102:80
SF	Vastervik	Vetlanda	104:88
Final	Dackarna	Vastervik	98:94

Allsvenskan
Stage	Team	Team	Agg Score
SF	Valsarna	Vargarna	105:87
Final	Lejonen	Valsarna	85:82

Division 1
Pos	Team	Pts
1	Team Kumla	24
2	Filbyterna	20
3	SMK Gävle	14
4	Nässjö	8
5	Team Mariestad	8
6	Bysarna	6
7	Eldarna	5
