= 1962 Swedish speedway season =

Motorcycle racing competition

The 1962 Swedish speedway season was the 15th season of motorcycle speedway in Sweden.

== Individual ==
=== Individual Championship ===
The 1962 Swedish Individual Speedway Championship final was held on 21 September in Gothenburg. Ove Fundin won the Swedish Championship for the fourth time.

Pos.	Rider	Club	Total
1	Ove Fundin	Kaparna	14+3
2	Göte Nordin	Getingarna	14+2
3	Sören Sjösten	Vargarna	13
4	Björn Knutson	Vargarna	12
5	Rune Sörmander	Dackarna	11
6	Göran Norlén	Monarkerna	9
7	Leif Larsson	Monarkerna	9
8	Per-Olof Söderman	Vargarna	7
9	Bengt Brannefors	Kaparna	7
10	Åke Andersson	Dackarna	5
11	Per-Tage Svensson	Dackarna	4
12	Bengt Jansson	Getingarna	3
13	Kjell Svensson	Monarkerna	3
14	Olle Nygren	Vargarna	2
15	Willihard Thomsson	Folkare	1
16	Curt Eldh (res)	Vargarna	1
17	Bo Håkansson (res)	Örnarna	0

=== Swedish Junior Championship ===
Winner - Stan Karlsson

== Team ==
=== Team Championship ===
Dackarna won division 1 and were declared the winners of the Swedish Speedway Team Championship for the fourth time. The Dackarna team included Rune Sörmander, Per-Tage Svensson and Åke Andersson.

The league system changed from two regional second divisions to a second and third division.

Getingarna won the second division and Gamarna won the third division.

Div 1
Pos	Team	Pts
1	Dackarna	8
2	Kaparna	6
3	Monarkerna	6
4	Vargarna	4

Div 2
Pos	Team	Pts
1	Getingarna	24
2	Njudungarna	11.5
3	Folkare	11
4	Örnarna	10
5	Indianerna	3.5

Div 3
Pos	Team	Pts
1	Gamarna	10
2	Taxarna	7
3	Danderyd	4
4	Filbyterna	3

== See also ==
- Speedway in Sweden
