= 1950 Swedish speedway season =

Motorcycle racing competition

The 1950 Swedish speedway season was the 1950 season of motorcycle speedway in Sweden.

== Individual ==
=== Individual Championship ===
The 1950 Swedish Individual Speedway Championship final was held on 20 October, in Stockholm. Helge Brinkeback won the Swedish Championship.

Pos.	Rider	Club	Points
1	Helge Brinkeback	Vargarna	12+3
2	Eskil Carlsson	Monarkerna	12+2
3	Linus Eriksson	Filbyterna	12+1
4	Evert Fransson	Indianerna	11
5	Harry Lundberger	Griparna	10
6	Rune Sörmander	Dackarna	10
7	Göte Olsson	Indianerna	9
8	Sune Karlsson	Getingarna	9
9	Gösta Kugelberg	Filbyterna	8
10	Olle Nygren	Vargarna	5
11	Hans Danielsson	Piraterna	4
12	Lennart Åström	Vargarna	4
13	Bengt Gustafsson	Dackarna	4
14	Gunnar Nordvall	Dackarna	3
15	Einar Lindqvist	Vargarna	3
16	Gösta Zanderholm (res)	Filbyterna	3
17	Kjell Carlsson	Filbyterna	1

== Team ==
=== Team Championship ===
Filbyterna won division 1 and were declared the winners of the Swedish Speedway Team Championship for the second time.

Piraterna won the A division of the newly created second-tier league. Saxarna won the B division and Vetlanda won the C division.

Name changes this season included; SMK Stockholm who became Monarkerna, Smålänningarna who became Dackarna and GEMA who became Kaparna.

Two reserve sides also competed under the names of Gastarna (Kaparna B) and Husarerna (Indianerna).

Div 1
Pos	Team	Pts
1	Filbyterna	21
2	Vargarna	19
3	Monarkerna	13
4	Indianerna	12
5	Griparna	8
6	Getingarna	7
7	Dackarna	4

Div 2A
Pos	Team	Pts
1	Piraterna	10
2	Kaparna	8
3	Kuggarna	4
4	Vikingarna	2

Div 2B
Pos	Team	Pts
1	Saxarna	7
2	Gastarna	7
3	Falkarna	6
4	Kanonerna	4
5	Husarerna	4
6	Örnarna	2

Div 2C
Pos	Team	Pts
1	Vetlanda	7
2	Vimmerby	1
3	Växjö	0
4	Tändstiftet	0

== See also ==
- Speedway in Sweden
