= 1949 Swedish speedway season =

Motorcycle racing competition

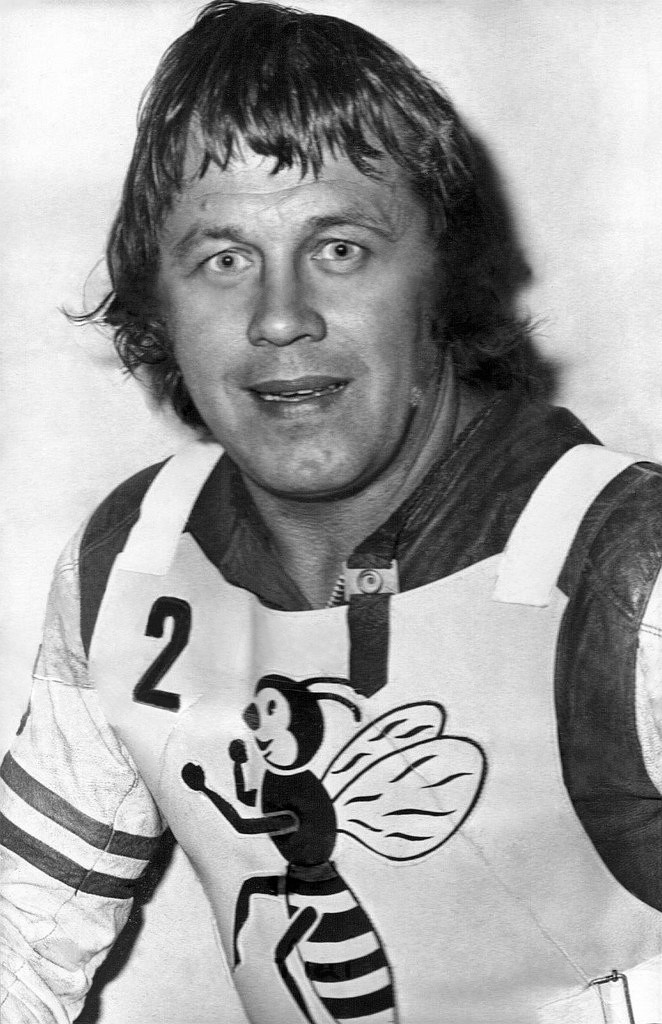
- Olle Nygren, inaugural Swedish champion

The 1949 Swedish speedway season was the 1949 season of motorcycle speedway in Sweden.

== Individual ==
=== Individual Championship ===
The 1949 Swedish Individual Speedway Championship final was held on 21 October in Stockholm. Olle Nygren won the inaugural Swedish Championship.

Pos.	Rider	Club	Points	Total
1	Olle Nygren	Vargarna	3 3 3 3 3	15
2	Sune Karlsson	Getingarna	3 3 1 3 3	13
3	Einar Lindqvist	Vargarna	2 3 3 2 2	12+3
4	Fritz Löfqvist	Getingarna	2 3 3 3 1	12+2
5	Stig Pramberg	Vargarna	3 1 3 2 2	11
6	Eskil Carlsson	SMK Stockholm	3 2 3 2 0	10
7	Linus Eriksson	Filbyterna	1 2 1 1 3	9
8	Gunnar Hellqvist	Griparna	0 2 2 1 3	8
9	Helge Brinkeback	Vargarna	1 1 1 2 2	7
10	Börje Haag	SMK Stockholm	2 S 2 1 2	7
11	Evert Fransson	Indianerna	2 0 2 0 1	5
12	Joel Jansson	Griparna	U 2 0 1 1	4
13	Lennart Carlström	Vargarna	1 1 0 1 0	3
14	Ragnar Friberg	GEMA Goteborg	1 0 0 0 1	2
15	Gösta Kugelberg	Filbyterna	0 1 1 0 0	2
16	Lennart Lindell	Griparna	0 0 0 0 0	0

== Team ==
=== Team Championship ===
Vargarna won the league and were declared the winners of the Swedish Speedway Team Championship.

The league was increased from seven teams to ten teams with the additions of Smålänningarnaa, Piraterna and GEMA Goteborg.

There were also three name changes; Motorsällskapet Stockholm became Getingarna (the Wasps), Nyköping became Griparna (the Grippers) and Vendelsö became Tigrarna.

League
Pos	Team	P	W	L	Pts
1	Vargarna	9	9	0	18
2	SMK Stockholm	9	8	1	16
3	Filbyterna	9	6	3	12
4	Getingarna	9	6	3	12
5	Indianerna	9	4	5	8
6	Griparna	9	4	5	8
7	Smålänningarnaa	9	4	5	8
8	Piraterna	9	3	6	6
9	GEMA Goteborg	9	1	8	2
10	Tigrarna	9	0	9	0

== See also ==
- Speedway in Sweden
