= 1964 Swedish speedway season =

Motorcycle racing competition

The 1964 Swedish speedway season was the 1964 season of motorcycle speedway in Sweden.

== Individual ==
=== Individual Championship ===
The 1964 Swedish Individual Speedway Championship final was held on 25 September in Stockholm. Ove Fundin won the Swedish Championship for the fifth time.

Pos.	Rider	Club	Total
1	Ove Fundin	Kaparna	14+3
2	Rune Sörmander	Dackarna	14+2
3	Björn Knutson	Vargarna	12
4	Sören Sjösten	Vargarna	11
5	Göte Nordin	Getingarna	10
6	Leif Larsson	Getingarna	10
7	Per-Tage Svensson	Dackarna	7
8	Gunnar Malmqvist	Njudungarna	7
9	Bernt Nilsson	Getingarna	6
10	Per-Olof Söderman	Vargarna	6
11	Bengt Jansson	Getingarna	5
12	Bo Magnusson	Kaparna	5
13	Bengt Svensson	Örnarna	4
14	Hans Holmqvist	Folkare	3
15	Bo Josefsson	Njudungarna	3
16	Curt Eldh	Vargarna	2
17	Willihard Thomsson (res)	Folkare	1

=== Junior Championship ===
Winner - Karl Erik Andersson

== Team ==
=== Team Championship ===
Getingarna won division 1 and were declared the winners of the Swedish Speedway Team Championship for the third time and second consecutive year. The Getingarna team contained Göte Nordin, Leif Larsson and Bengt Jansson.

Vargarna won the second division, Taxarna and Kaparna B won the third division A & B respectively.

Smålands Lejon were renamed Lejonen and Folkare became Masarna.

Div 1
Pos	Team	Pts
1	Getingarna	17
2	Dackarna	15
3	Kaparna	15
4	Örnarna	1

Div 2
Pos	Team	Pts
1	Vargarna	23
2	Masarna	16
3	Njudungarna	10
4	Gamarna	8.5
5	Filbyterna	2.5

Div 3 A
Pos	Team	Pts
1	Taxarna	9
2	Indianerna	7.5
3	Smederna	6.5
4	Rospiggarna	4
5	Lejonen	3

Div 3B
Pos	Team	Pts
1	Kaparna B	11
2	Dackarna B	10
3	Örnarna B	5
4	Njudungarna B	3.5
5	Masarna B	1.5

== See also ==
- Speedway in Sweden
