= 2020 Swedish speedway season =

Motorcycle speedway season

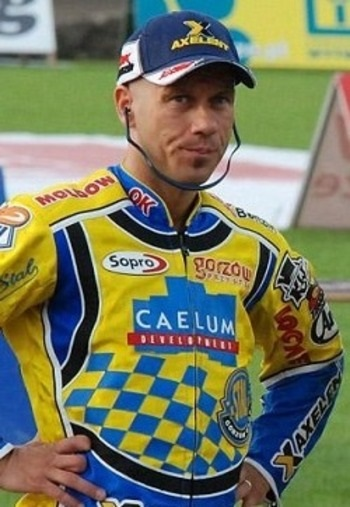
- The veteran campaigner Nicki Pedersen helped Masarna win the Elitserien.

The 2020 Swedish speedway season was the 2020 season of motorcycle speedway in Sweden.

== Individual ==
=== Individual Championship ===
The 2020 Swedish Individual Speedway Championship final was held at the Skrotfrag Arena in Målilla on 23 July 2020.

The title was won by Jacob Thorssell for the second successive season.

Pos	Rider	Rider	Pts	Total	SF	Final
1	Jacob Thorssell	Dacakarna	(2,3,3,3,3)	14		3
2	Oliver Berntzon	Dacakarna	(2,0,3,2,3)	10	3	2
3	Pontus Aspgren	Indianerna	(3,3,3,2,2)	13		1
4	Mathias Thoernblom	Lejonen	(3,2,2,3,3)	13		0
5	Daniel Henderson	Rospiggarna	(3,1,1,1,2)	8	2	
6	Kim Nilsson	Masarna	(0,3,3,3,3)	12	1	
7	Jonatan Grahn	Indianerna	(3,2,1,0,1)	7	0	
8	Filip Hjelmland	Vetlanda	(2,2,2,1,0)	7		
9	Linus Sundström	Vastervik	(0,3,1,1,1)	6		
	Ludvig Lindgren	Indianerna	(1,0,2,2,1)	6		
	Joel Andersson	Indianerna	(1,2,0,2,1)	6		
12	Victor Palovaara	Vetlanda	(0,0,0,3,2)	5		
	Joel Kling	Dacakarna	(1,1,2,1,0)	5		
14	Alexander Woentin	Vetlanda	(1,1,0,0,2)	4		
15	Philip Hellstrom Bangs	Masarna	(2,0,1,0,0)	3		
16	Maksymilian Bogdanowicz	Lejonen	(0,1,0,0,0)	1		
17	John Lindman (res)	Vastervik	(-)	dnr		
	Christoffer Selvin (res)	Indianerna	(-)	dnr		

=== U21 Championship ===
Winner - Alexander Woentin

== Team ==
=== Team Championship ===
Masarna won the Elitserien.

The Allsvenskan (second-tier league) was not held due to the COVID-19 pandemic.

Elitserien
Pos	Team	Pts
1	Lejonen	12
2	Rospiggarna	11
3	Dackarna	9
4	Vetlanda	9
5	Masarna	9
6	Indianerna	6
7	Västervik	6
8	Piraterna	2

Allsvenskan
Pos	Team	Pts
not held due to COVID-19 pandemic

Play offs

Elitserien
Stage	Team	Team	Agg Score
QF	Indianerna	Dackarna	104:75
QF	Masarna	Vetlanda	102:87
QF	Vastervik	Rospiggarna	99:81
QF	Lejonen	Piraterna	119:61
SF	Indianerna	Vastervik	108:72
SF	Masarna	Lejonen	99:81
Final	Masarna	Indianerna	98:82
