= 1977 Swedish speedway season =

Motorcycle racing competition

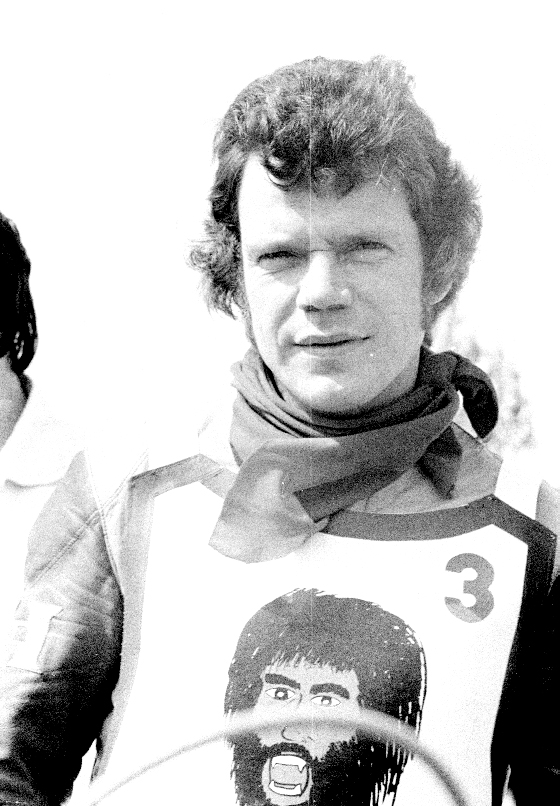
- Bernt Persson, individual champion and team champion with Smederna

The 1977 Swedish speedway season was the 1977 season of motorcycle speedway in Sweden.

== Individual ==
=== Individual Championship ===
The 1977 Swedish Individual Speedway Championship final was held on 19 August in Kumla. Bernt Persson won the Swedish Championship.

Pos.	Rider	Club	Points
1	Bernt Persson	Smederna	15
2	Tommy Nilsson	Getingarna	14
3	Sören Karlsson	Vargarna	11+3
4	Hans Holmqvist	Indianerna	11+2
5	Bengt Jansson	Smederna	11+1
6	Jan Andersson	Kaparna	10
7	Christer Sjösten	Bysarna	10
8	Tommy Pettersson	Vargarna	10
9	Karl-Erik Claesson	Örnarna	6
10	Tommy Johansson	Dackarna	6
11	Jan Johansson	Skepparna	6
12	Per-Åke Gerhardsson	Indianerna	4
13	Bo Wirebrand	Njudungarna	3
14	Börje Klingberg	Örnarna	2
15	Lars-Inge Hultberg	Gamarna	1
16	Jan Davidsson	Piraterna	0
17	Conny Samuelsson (res)	Njudungarna	0
18	Bertil Andersson (res)	Dackarna	0

=== Junior Championship ===
Winner - Peter Johansson

== Team ==
=== Team Championship ===
Smederna won division 1 and were declared the winners of the Swedish Speedway Team Championship for the second time. The Smederna team included Bernt Persson and Bengt Jansson.

The league was expanded to five divisions for the first time, with three regional leagues in the third division.Skepparna won the second division, while Gamarna, Brassarna and Vikingarna won the third division regional leagues.

Div 1
Pos	Team	Pts
1	Smederna	22
2	Njudungarna	21
3	Indianerna	14
4	Getingarna	13
5	Dackarna	13
6	Örnarna	11
7	Vargarna	10
8	Bysarna	8

Div 2
Pos	Team	Pts
1	Skepparna	20
2	Kaparna	16
3	Lejonen	12
4	Masarna	12
5	Eldarna	8
6	Piraterna	8
7	Filbyterna	8

Div 3 north & south
Pos	Team	Pts
1	Gamarna	15
2	Stjärnorna	12
3	Jämtarna	8
1	Brassarna	19
2	Hjälmarna	18
3	Gnistorna	10
4	Korparna	1

Div 3 west
Pos	Team	Pts
1	Vikingarna	19
2	Solkatterna	14
3	Lindarna	13
4	Pilarna	2

== See also ==
- Speedway in Sweden
