= 1966 Swedish speedway season =

Motorcycle racing competition

The 1966 Swedish speedway season was the 1966 season of motorcycle speedway in Sweden.

== Individual ==
=== Individual Championship ===
The 1966 Swedish Individual Speedway Championship final was held on 7 October in Stockholm. Ove Fundin won the Swedish Championship for the sixth time.

The final ended with five riders tied on 12 points, Fundin won the race-off.

Pos.	Rider	Club	Total
1	Ove Fundin	Kaparna	12+x+3
2	Sören Sjösten	Vargarna	12+1+2
3	Bengt Jansson	Getingarna	12+2+1
4	Göte Nordin	Getingarna	12+3+0
5	Leif Enecrona	Gamarna	12+0+x
6	Leif Larsson	Getingarna	11
7	Björn Knutson	Vargarna	10
8	Hans Holmqvist (res)	Taxarna	7
9	Per-Olof Söderman	Vargarna	6
10	Karl-Erik Andersson	Kaparna	6
11	Bernt Persson	Vargarna	4
12	Bengt Svensson	Örnarna	4
13	Torbjörn Harrysson	Vargarna	4
14	Bo Magnusson	Kaparna	3
15	Gunnar Malmqvist	Njudungarna	2
16	Åke Andersson	Njudungarna	2
17	Bengt Brannefors	Kaparna	1

=== Junior Championship ===
Winner - Egon Stengarn

== Team ==
=== Team Championship ===
Getingarna continued their recent domination by winning division 1 again and being declared the winners of the Swedish Speedway Team Championship for the fourth consecutive season. The Getingarna team contained Göte Nordin, Leif Larsson, Bengt Jansson and Arne Carlsson.

The league consisted of 14 teams (down from 19) resulting in only three divisions. Njudungarna won the second division and Indianerna won the third division.

Div 1
Pos	Team	Pts
1	Getingarna	19.5
2	Vargarna	15.5
3	Örnarna	12.5
4	Kaparna	9.5
5	Gamarna	12.5

Div 2
Pos	Team	Pts
1	Njudungarna	22
2	Lejonen	13
3	Taxarna	11
4	Masarna	2

Div 3
Pos	Team	Pts
1	Indianerna	20
2	Smederna	15.5
3	Stjärnorna	13.5
4	Skepparna	10
5	Filbyterna	1

== See also ==
- Speedway in Sweden
