= 1965 Swedish speedway season =

Motorcycle racing competition

The 1965 Swedish speedway season was the 1965 season of motorcycle speedway in Sweden.

== Individual ==
=== Individual Championship ===
The 1965 Swedish Individual Speedway Championship final was held on 16 October in Stockholm. Göte Nordin won the Swedish Championship.

Pos.	Rider	Club	Total
1	Göte Nordin	Getingarna	14+3
2	Ove Fundin	Kaparna	14+2
3	Leif Larsson	Getingarna	13
4	Per-Olof Söderman	Vargarna	11
5	Bengt Jansson	Getingarna	10
6	Leif Enecrona	Gamarna	10
7	Bo Magnusson	Kaparna	8
8	Bengt Svensson	Örnarna	7
9	Arne Carlsson	Getingarna	7
10	Kurt Westlund	Folkare	7
11	Bo Josefsson	Njudungarna	6
12	Bengt Brannefors	Kaparna	6
13	Runo Wedin	Vargarna	3
14	Nils Ringström (res)	Taxarna	3
15	Sven Sigurd	Örnarna	1
16	Arne Hansson	Kaparna	0
17	Gunnar Malmqvist	Njudungarna	0

=== Junior Championship ===
Winner - Therje Henriksson

== Team ==
=== Team Championship ===
Getingarna won division 1 and were declared the winners of the Swedish Speedway Team Championship for the third consecutive season and fourth time in total. The Getingarna team contained Göte Nordin, Leif Larsson and Bengt Jansson.

Gamarna won the second division, while Lejonen and Kaparna B won the third division A & B respectively.

Div 1
Pos	Team	Pts
1	Getingarna	17
2	Vargarna	16
3	Kaparna	15.5
4	Örnarna	8.5
5	Dackarna	3

Div 2
Pos	Team	Pts
1	Gamarna	20.5
2	Njudungarna	18.5
3	Masarna	9
4	Taxarna	8
5	Filbyterna	4

Div 3 A
Pos	Team	Pts
1	Lejonen	9
2	Indianerna	9
3	Smederna	8
4	Stjärnorna	4
5	Rospiggarna	0

Div 3 B
Pos	Team	Pts
1	Kaparna B	11
2	Örnarna B	7
3	Njudungarna B	6
4	Dackarna B	5

== See also ==
- Speedway in Sweden
