= 1973 Swedish speedway season =

Motorcycle racing competition

The 1973 Swedish speedway season was the 1973 season of motorcycle speedway in Sweden.

== Individual ==
=== Individual Championship ===
The 1973 Swedish Individual Speedway Championship final was held on 21 September in Gothenburg. Tommy Johansson won the Swedish Championship.

Pos.	Rider	Club	Total
1	Tommy Johansson	Dackarna	14
2	Bo Wirebrand	Njudungarna	13
3	Tommy Jansson	Smederna	11
4	Leif Enecrona	Getingarna	10
5	Göte Nordin	Smederna	10
6	Berndt Johansson	Bysarna	9
7	Stefan Salmonsson	Smederna	7
8	Bernt Persson	Indianerna	6
9	Anders Michanek	Getingarna	6
10	Lars Jansson	Valsarna	6
11	Karl-Erik Claesson	Örnarna	6
12	Tomas Pettersson	Vargarna	5
13	Willy Karlsson	Njudungarna	5
14	Sven Nilsson	Bysarna	4
15	lars Larsson (res)	Piraterna	4
16	Leif Mellberg (res)	Vikingarna	3
17	Ragnar Holm	Filbyterna	1
18	Bo Josefsson	Lejonen	0

=== Junior Championship ===
Winner - Sven Andersson

== Team ==
=== Team Championship ===
Smederna won division 1 and were declared the winners of the Swedish Speedway Team Championship for the first time. The Smederna team included Tommy Jansson, Göte Nordin and Bengt Jansson.

Indianerna and Kaparna won the second division east and west respectively, while Piraterna won the third division.

Div 1
Pos	Team	Pts
1	Smederna	25
2	Bysarna	18
3	Getingarna	17
4	Dackarna	12
5	Vargarna	12
6	Njudungarna	11
7	Örnarna	9
8	Lejonen	8

Div 2 west
Pos	Team	Pts
1	Indianerna	23
2	Valsarna	11
3	Lindarna	11
4	Masarna	8
5	Vikingarna	7

Div 2 east
Pos	Team	Pts
1	Kaparna	21
2	Skepparna	17
3	Filbyterna	13
4	Gamarna	7
5	Eldarna	3

Div 3
Pos	Team	Pts
1	Piraterna	19
2	Jämtarna	13
3	Stjärnorna	5
4	Solkatterna	5

== See also ==
- Speedway in Sweden
