= 1984 Swedish speedway season =

Motorcycle racing competition

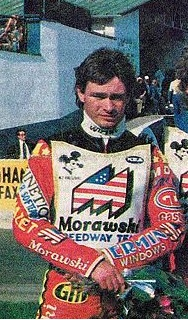
- Jimmy Nilsen was the 1984 junior champion

The 1984 Swedish speedway season was the 1984 season of motorcycle speedway in Sweden.

== Individual ==
=== Individual Championship ===
The 1984 Swedish Individual Speedway Championship final was held on 8 September in Karlstad. Jan Andersson won the Swedish Championship for the fourth time.

Pos	Rider	Team	Pts	Total
1	Jan Andersson	Kaparna	(3,2,3,3,3)	14
2	Jimmy Nilsen	Getingarna	(3,2,2,3,3)	13
3	Ulf Blomqvist	Njudungarna	(3,3,3,2,1)	12
4	Tommy Nilsson	Getingarna	(3,3,2,0,3)	11
5	Pierre Brannefors	Kaparna	(2,1,3,2,3)	11
6	Anders Michanek	Gamarna	(2,2,1,3,2)	10
7	Lars Anderson	Gamarna	(0,3,3,1,2)	9
8	John Ericsson	Solkatterna	(2,1,2,1,2)	8
9	Jan Davidsson	Indianerna	(1,3,0,0,2)	6
10	Bengt Jansson	Rospiggarna	(1,0,0,3,1)	5
11	Kenneth Nystrom	Örnarna	(0,2,2,1,0)	5
12	Conny Ivarsson	Njudungarna	(1,0,1,2,1)	5
13	Lillebror Johansson	Solkatterna	(1,1,1,2,d)	5
14	Per Jonsson	Getingarna	(2,d,1,0,1)	4
15	Ove Osterberg	Indianerna	(0,1,0,1,0)	2
16	Alfa Trofast	Njudungarna	(u,0,0,0,0)	0
17	Patrick Karlsson	Vargarna	(0)	0

=== Swedish U21 Championship ===
Winner - Jimmy Nilsen

== Team ==
=== Team Championship ===
Kaparna won the Elitserien were declared the winners of the Swedish Speedway Team Championship after a play off win over Njudungarna. The Kaparna team included Pierre Brannefors and brothers Björn Andersson and Jan Andersson.

The Smederna club split up in two separate clubs called Smederna and Tuna Rebels and the league format changed in that there were only four divisions.

Solkatterna won the first division, while Vikingarna and Lejonen won the second division north and south respectively.

Elitserien
Pos	Team	Pts
1	Kaparna	23+
2	Njudungarna	23
3	Örnarna	16
4	Getingarna	15
5	Indianerna	15
6	Gamarna	11
7	Vargarna	7
8	Smederna	2

Div 1
Pos	Team	Pts
1	Solkatterna	28
2	Rospiggarna	19
3	Bysarna	16
4	Brassarna	16
5	Dackarna	16
6	Filbyterna	11
7	Skepparna	4
8	Masarna	2

Div 2 north
Pos	Team	Pts
1	Vikingarna	21
2	Tuna Rebels	21
3	Valsarna	18
4	Lindarna	9
5	Gävle	9
6	Eldarna	5
7	Griparna	1

Div 2 south
Pos	Team	Pts
1	Lejonen	14
2	Piraterna	14
3	Korparna	6
4	Gnistorna	6
5	Pilarna	0

+ (won play off)

== See also ==
- Speedway in Sweden
