= 1969 Swedish speedway season =

Motorcycle racing competition

The 1969 Swedish speedway season was the 1969 season of motorcycle speedway in Sweden.

== Individual ==
=== Individual Championship ===
The 1969 Swedish Individual Speedway Championship final was held on 18 September in Gothenburg. Ove Fundin won the Swedish Championship for the eighth time.

Pos.	Rider	Club	Total
1	Ove Fundin	Kaparna	14+3
2	Göte Nordin	Kaparna	14+2
3	Anders Michanek	Getingarna	13
4	Hans Homqvist	Masarna	10
5	Lars Jansson	Indianerna	10
6	Bengt Larsson	Örnarna	10
7	Therje Henriksson	Lejonen	9
8	Sören Sjösten	Masarna	9
9	Nils Ringström	Indianerna	5
10	Leif Enecrona	Getingarna	5
11	Bernt Persson	Indianerna	5
12	Bengt Jansson	Getingarna	4
13	Christer Löfqvist	Bysarna	4
14	Tommy Bergqvist	Kaparna	4
15	Conny Samuelsson	Njudungarna	3
16	Sven Sigurd	Örnarna	1

=== Junior Championship ===
Karl Erik Claesson won the Junior Championship.

== Team ==
=== Team Championship ===
Getingarna won division 1 and were declared the winners of the Swedish Speedway Team Championship for the seventh time (and sixth time in the last seven years). The Getingarna team included Anders Michanek, Bengt Jansson and Leif Enecrona.

Örnarna won the second division, while Bysarna and Eldarna won the third division east and west respectively.

Div 1
Pos	Team	Pts
1	Getingarna	18
2	Njudungarna	12
3	Vargarna	8
4	Lejonen	8
5	Indianerna	8
6	Kaparna	6

Div 2
Pos	Team	Pts
1	Örnarna	21
2	Dackarna	15.5
3	Masarna	14
4	Smederna	7.5
5	Taxarna	1.5

Div 3 E
Pos	Team	Pts
1	Bysarna	18.5
2	Skepparna	13.5
3	Filbyterna	9
4	Gamarna	1

Div 3 W
Pos	Team	Pts
1	Eldarna	23
2	Vikingarna	18
3	Solkatterna	11
4	Lindarna	5

== See also ==
- Speedway in Sweden
