= Swedish Individual Speedway Championship =

Swedish national speedway competition

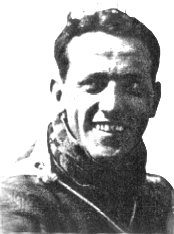
- Torsten Sjöberg, Sweden's first 500cc champion
- Sport: Motorcycle speedway
- Founded: 1936
- Most titles: Ove Fundin (9)

The Swedish Individual Championship is a competition for Swedish Speedway riders, held each year to determine the Swedish national champion.

== History ==
After World War II the first championship was held in 1948, although it was considered unofficial.

Ove Fundin holds the record for the most wins, having won the championship nine times from 1956 to 1969.

== Previous winners ==
Year	Venue	Winners	Runner-up	3rd place	Notes/ref
1936	Ullevi, Göteborg	Torsten Sjöberg	Bertil Carlsson	Bertil Svensson	
1937	Trollhättan	Torsten Sjöberg	Evert Fransson	Einar Lindqvist	
1938	Gävle	Torsten Sjöberg	Eskil Carlsson	Bertil Carlsson	
1939 to 1947 not held due to World War II
1948	Stockholm Olympic Stadium	Olle Nygren	Eskil Carlsson	Börje Haag	unofficial
1949	Stockholm Olympic Stadium	Olle Nygren	Sune Karlsson	Einar Lindqvist	
1950	Stockholm Olympic Stadium	Helge Brinkeback	Eskil Carlsson	Linus Eriksson	
1951	Stockholm Olympic Stadium	Helge Brinkeback	Göte Olsson	Sune Karlsson	
1952	Stockholm Olympic Stadium	Göte Olsson	Sune Karlsson	Bert Lindarw	
1953	Stockholm Olympic Stadium	Göran Norlén	Bert Lindarw	Olle Heyman	
1954	Final not staged				
1955	Stockholm Olympic Stadium	Rune Sörmander	Olle Nygren	Ove Fundin	
1956	Ullevi, Göteborg	Ove Fundin	Lars Pettersson	Per Olof Söderman	
1957	Stockholm Olympic Stadium	Ove Fundin	Per Olof Söderman	Rune Sörmander	
1958	Stockholm Olympic Stadium	Rune Sörmander	Olle Nygren	Ove Fundin	
1959	Ullevi, Göteborg	Rune Sörmander	Ove Fundin	Olle Nygren	
1960	Stockholm Olympic Stadium	Ove Fundin	Björn Knutson	Curt Nyqvist	
1961	Stockholm Olympic Stadium	Björn Knutson	Leif Larsson	Rune Sörmander	
1962	Ullevi, Göteborg	Ove Fundin	Göte Nordin	Sören Sjösten	
1963	Stockholm Olympic Stadium	Björn Knutson	Göte Nordin	Sören Sjösten	
1964	Stockholm Olympic Stadium	Ove Fundin	Rune Sörmander	Björn Knutson	
1965	Stockholm Olympic Stadium	Göte Nordin	Ove Fundin	Leif Larsson	
1966	Stockholm Olympic Stadium	Ove Fundin	Sören Sjösten	Bengt Jansson	
1967	Ullevi, Göteborg	Ove Fundin	Bo Josefsson	Torbjörn Harrysson	
1968	Stockholm Olympic Stadium	Leif Enecrona	Torbjörn Harrysson	Hasse Holmqvist	
1969	Ullevi, Göteborg	Ove Fundin	Göte Nordin	Anders Michanek	
1970	Stockholm Olympic Stadium	Ove Fundin	Bernt Persson	Anders Michanek	
1971	Stockholm Olympic Stadium	Göte Nordin	Anders Michanek	Leif Enecrona	
1972	Ryavallen, Borås	Anders Michanek	Bengt Jansson	Bernt Persson	
1973	Ullevi, Göteborg	Tommy Johansson	Bo Wirebrand	Tommy Jansson	
1974	Snälltorpet, Eskilstuna	Tommy Jansson	Anders Michanek	Tommy Johansson	
1975	Ullevi, Göteborg	Anders Michanek	Hasse Holmqvist	Tommy Jansson	
1976	Vetlanda Motorstadion	Anders Michanek	Bernt Persson	Christer Löfqvist	
1977	Kumla Motorstadion	Bernt Persson	Tommy Nilsson	Sören Karlsson	
1978	Snälltorpet, Eskilstuna	Anders Michanek	Bengt Jansson	Bernt Persson	
1979	Kumla Motorstadion	Jan Andersson	Lillebror Johansson	Bernt Persson	
1980	Snälltorpet, Eskilstuna	Jan Andersson	Börje Klingberg	Hans Danielsson	
1981	Vetlanda Motorstadion	Jan Andersson	Hans Danielsson	Tommy Nilsson	
1982	Snälltorpet, Eskilstuna	Anders Michanek	Tommy Nilsson	Jan Andersson	
1983	Grevby Motorstadion	Tommy Nilsson	Jan Andersson	Björn Andersson	
1984	Kalvholmen Motorbana	Jan Andersson	Jimmy Nilsen	Ulf Blomqvist	
1985	Målilla (Motorbana)	Erik Stenlund	Tommy Nilsson	Jan Andersson	
1986	Norrköping Motorstadion	Per Jonsson	Jan Andersson	Jimmy Nilsen	
1987	Ullevi, Göteborg	Per Jonsson	Jan Andersson	Jimmy Nilsen	
1988	Kumla Motorstadion	Per Jonsson	Roland Dannö	Peter Nahlin	
1989	Snälltorpet, Eskilstuna	Peter Karlsson	Mikael Blixt	Per Jonsson	
1990	Gubbängens IP, Stockholm	Tony Rickardsson	Erik Stenlund	Per Jonsson	
1991	Vetlanda Motorstadion	Peter Karlsson	Peter Nahlin	Per Jonsson	
1992	Grevby Motorstadion	John Cook ( (United States) )	Per Jonsson	Claes Ivarsson	
1993	Linköping Motorstadion	Per Jonsson	Tony Rickardsson	Henrik Gustafsson	
1994	Ljungheden, Västervik	Tony Rickardsson	Henrik Gustafsson	Jimmy Nilsen	
1995	Kumla Motorstadion	Henrik Gustafsson	Peter Karlsson	Kenneth Lindby	
1996	Orionparken, Hallstavik	Jimmy Nilsen	Tony Rickardsson	Henrik Gustafsson	
1997	Vetlanda Motorstadion	Tony Rickardsson	Henrik Gustafsson	Peter Karlsson	
1998	Tallhult Motorstadion, Hagfors	Tony Rickardsson	Mikael Max	Peter Karlsson	
1999	Norrköping Motorstadion	Tony Rickardsson	Peter Karlsson	Mikael Max	
2000	Målilla Motorstadion	Henrik Gustafsson	Niklas Klingberg	Mikael Max	
2001	Avesta Motorstadion	Tony Rickardsson	Mikael Max	Andreas Jonsson	
2002	Smedstadion, Eskilstuna	Niklas Klingberg	Mikael Max	Peter Karlsson	
2003	Tallhult Motorstadion, Hagfors	Stefan Dannö	Stefan Andersson	Mikael Max	
2004	Målilla Motorstadion	Tony Rickardsson	Antonio Lindbäck	Mikael Max	
2005	Vetlanda Motorstadion	Tony Rickardsson	Peter Karlsson	Mikael Max	
2006	Motala Arena	Andreas Jonsson	Antonio Lindbäck	Fredrik Lindgren	
2007	Kumla Motorstadion	Andreas Jonsson	Jonas Davidsson	Peter Karlsson	
2008	Avesta Motorstadion	Magnus Zetterström	Jonas Davidsson	Thomas H. Jonasson	
2009	G&B Stadium	Andreas Jonsson	Fredrik Lindgren	Thomas H. Jonasson	
2010	G&B Stadium	Andreas Jonsson	Fredrik Lindgren	Magnus Zetterström	
2011	G&B Stadium	Andreas Jonsson	Fredrik Lindgren	Antonio Lindbäck	
2012	Vetlanda Motorstadion	Daniel Nermark	Andreas Jonsson	Thomas H Jonasson	
2013	Vetlanda Motorstadion	Andreas Jonsson	Jonas Davidsson	Peter Ljung	
2014	Nyköpings Motorstadion	Thomas H Jonasson	Kim Nilsson	Fredrik Lindgren	
2015	Parken, Hallstavik	Antonio Lindbäck	Andreas Jonsson	Peter Ljung	
2016	HZ Bygg Arena, Hallstavik	Andreas Jonsson	Antonio Lindbäck	Kim Nilsson	
2017	Avesta Motorstadion, Avesta	Antonio Lindbäck	Fredrik Lindgren	Kim Nilsson	
2018	Smedstadion, Eskilstuna	Fredrik Lindgren	Oliver Berntzon	Peter Ljung	
2019	HZ Bygg Arena, Hallstavik	Jacob Thorssell	Andreas Jonsson	Kim Nilsson	
2020	G&B Stadium, Målilla	Jacob Thorssell	Oliver Berntzon	Pontus Aspgren	
2021	G&B Stadium, Målilla	Fredrik Lindgren	Pontus Aspgren	Oliver Berntzon	
2022	Linköping Motorstadion, Linköping	Oliver Berntzon	Jacob Thorssell	Kim Nilsson	
2023	Skrotfrag Arena, Målilla	Fredrik Lindgren	Jacob Thorssell	Timo Lahti ( (Finland) )	
2024	Hejla Arena, Västervik	Fredrik Lindgren	Kim Nilsson	Filip Hjelmland	
2025	Norrköping Motorstadion	Fredrik Lindgren	Kim Nilsson	Jacob Thorssell	

== Medals classification ==
Pos	Rider	Gold	Silver	Bronze
1.	Ove Fundin	9	2	2
2.	Tony Rickardsson	8	2	
3.	Andreas Jonsson	7	3	1
4.	Fredrik Lindgren	5	4	1
5.	Anders Michanek	5	2	2
6.	Jan Andersson	4	3	2
7.	Per Jonsson	4	1	3
8.	Rune Sörmander	3	1	2
9.	Peter Karlsson	2	3	4
10.	Antonio Lindbäck	2	3	1
11.	Göte Nordin	2	3	
12.	Henrik Gustafsson	2	2	2
13.	Jacob Thorssell	2	2	1
14.	Björn Knutson	2	1	1
15.	Helge Brinkeback	2		
16.	Tommy Nilsson	1	3	1
17.	Bernt Persson	1	2	3
18.	Olle Nygren	1	2	1
	Oliver Berntzon	1	2	1
20.	Jimmy Nilsen	1	1	3
21.	Niklas Klingberg	1	1	
	Erik Stenlund	1	1	
	Göte Olsson	1	1	
24.	Thomas H. Jonasson	1		3
25.	Tommy Jansson	1		2
26.	Magnus Zetterström	1		1
27.	Daniel Nermark	1		
	Stefan Dannö	1		
	John Cook ( (United States) )	1		
	Tommy Johansson	1		
	Leif Enecrona	1		
	Göran Norlén	1		

== See also ==
- History of motorcycle speedway in Sweden
