= 2021 Swedish speedway season =

Motorcycle speedway season

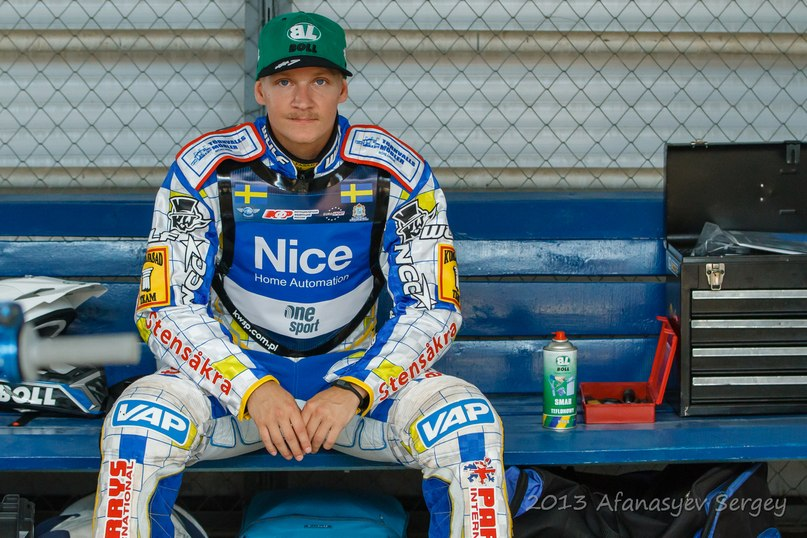
- Freddie Lindgren won his second Swedish title.

The 2021 Swedish speedway season was the 2021 season of motorcycle speedway in Sweden.

== Individual ==
=== Individual Championship ===
The 2021 Swedish Individual Speedway Championship final was held at the Skrotfrag Arena in Målilla on 13 July 2021.

The title was won by Freddie Lindgren for the second time.

Pos.	Rider	Team	Points	Total	Final
1	Freddie Lindgren	Vastervik	(3,3,2,3,3)	14	3
2	Pontus Aspgren	Smederna	(3,3,3,2,1)	12	2
3	Oliver Berntzon	Lejonen	(3,3,1,3,3)	13	1
4	Kim Nilsson	Rospiggarna	(2,3,3,1,3)	12	0
5	Philip Hellström Bängs	Masarna	(0,2,3,3,3)	11	
6	Joel Andersson	Indianerna	(2,2,1,1,2)	8	
7	Victor Palovaara	Vetlanda	(1,0,1,3,2)	7	
	Ludvig Lindgren	Indianerna	(2,0,2,2,1)	7	
9	Mathias Thörnblom	Lejonen	(2,1,1,d,2)	6	
10	Gustav Grahn (res)	Indianerna	(2,1,2)	5	
	Peter Ljung	Vetlanda	(1,2,u,2,d)	5	
12	Alexander Woentin	Piraterna	(1,2,0,1,1)	5	
13	Filip Hjelmland	Vetlanda	(0,1,3,d,t)	4	
14	Jacob Thorssell	Dackarna	(3,w,)	3	
	Linus Eklöf	Lejonen	(1,0,0,2,0)	3	
16	Daniel Henderson	Rospiggarna	(0,1,2,0,u)	3	
17	Casper Henriksson	Lejonen	(0,1,0,0,w)	1	
	Joel Kling (res)	Smederna	(1)	1	

=== U21 Championship ===
Winner - Gustav Grahn

== Team ==
=== Team Championship ===
Dackarna won the Elitserien. The team included Tai Woffinden, Jason Doyle, Maciej Janowski and Jacob Thorssell.

Indianerna B won the Allsvenskan (second-tier league).

Elitserien
Pos	Team	Pts
1	Smederna	25
2	Västervik	22
3	Dackarna	21
4	Rospiggarna	19
5	Vetlanda	17
6	Lejonen	16
7	Indianerna	12
8	Masarna	9
9	Piraterna	3

Allsvenskan
Pos	Team	Pts
1	Valsarna	18
2	Indianerna B	16
3	Griparna	16
4	Team Rapid	14
5	Vargarna	7
6	Smålänningarna	0

Play offs

Elitserien
Stage	Team	Team	Agg Score
QF	Dackarna	Lejonen	104:76
QF	Rospiggarna	Vetlanda	95:85
SF	Smederna	Rospiggarna	92:87
SF	Dackarna	Vastervik	96:84
Final	Dackarna	Smederna	99:81

Allsvenskan
Stage	Team	Team	Agg
SF	Griparna	Valsarna	103:77
SF	Indianerna B	Team Rapid	73:71
Final	Indianerna B	Griparna	92:88
