= History of motorcycle speedway in Sweden =

Speedway in Sweden

The History of motorcycle speedway in Sweden consists of the league tables of motorcycle speedway in Sweden.

== History ==
The first season was in 1948 but it was during the 1950s motorcycle speedway became one of Sweden's most popular team sports where each fixture drew audiences between 10,000 and 20,000 people.

The Swedish Speedway Team Championship was founded a few years earlier in 1948 and was inspired by British speedway including adopting the British teams nicknames in Swedish versions. For instance the Norrköping team became Vargarna (English: "The Wolves"), the Eskilstuna team became Smederna (English: "The Blacksmiths") and the club Motorsällskapet became Getingarna (English: "The Wasps"). As popularity of the sport grew there were many new clubs founded all around Sweden and during the 1950s more than 30 different clubs competed at least one season in the league system. Some of these teams were short lived and only survived a few years but some continue to compete in the Elitserien and Allsvenskan today.

== See also ==
- Swedish Speedway Team Championship
- Speedway in Sweden
