= Ljungheden =

Stadium in Västervik, Sweden

- Location: Stora Infartsvägen, 593 22 Västervik, Sweden
- Coordinates: 57°46′07″N 16°35′17″E
- Capacity: 9,000
- Operator: Västervik Speedway
- Opened: 8 May 1952
- Length: 296 m (0.184 mi)

Ljungheden also known as the Hejla Arena (for sponsorship purposes) is a motorcycle speedway track located in the north western outskirts of Västervik. The track is on the Stora Infartsvägen road and forms part of the Westerviks Motorsportklubb.

The stadium hosts the Västervik Speedway speedway team that compete in the Swedish Speedway Team Championship and have been champions of Sweden on one occasion.

== History ==
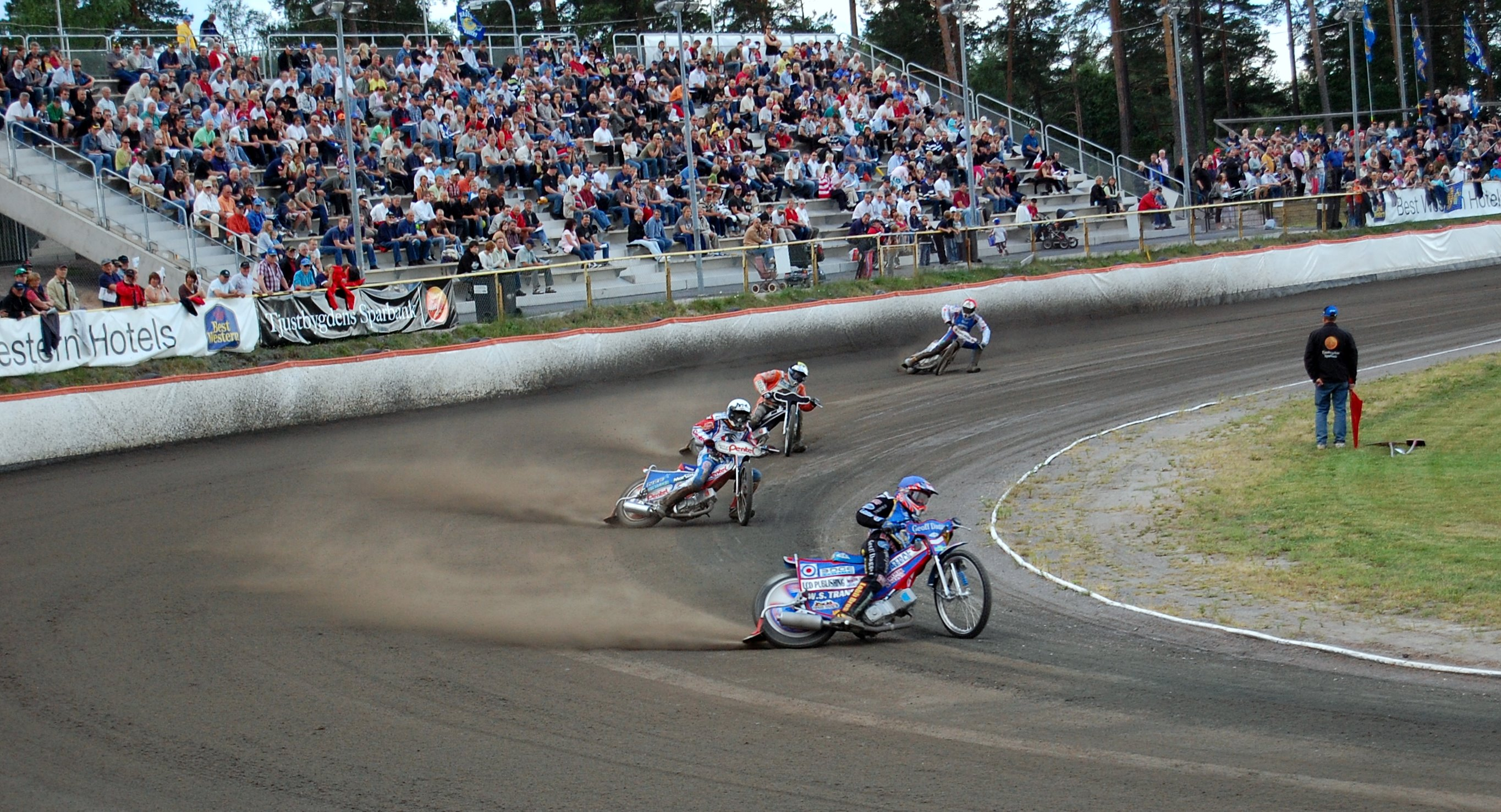
Action from Ljungheden in 2007

The stadium opened on 8 May 1952. The record attendance of 9,398 was set on 3 October 2007.

In 1994, the stadium hosted the Swedish Individual Speedway Championship and in 1997 and 2001 it held the Intercontinental final.

From 2011 to 2018, the stadium was known as the Stena Arena It hosted events as part of the 2016 Speedway World Cup and 2017 Speedway World Cups.

In 2018, the stadium was renamed the Hejla Arena following sponsorship from the laser and gas cutting company Hejla Skärteknik.

== Track names ==
- Västerviks Motorstadion, Västerviks Motorbana (1952-2008)
- Sparbanken Arena (2008–2010)
- Stena Arena (2011–2018)
- Hejla Arena (2018–present)

== Track records ==
- 340m, Rune Sörmander, 67.2 (1953)
- 340m, Bo Magnusson, 66.2 (1964)
- 340m, Leif Enecrona, 65.2 (1965)
- 340m, Jan Johansson, 65.0 (25 September 1977)
- 340m, Mikhail Starostin, 64.8
- 340m, Tommy Johansson, 64.4 (11 May 1980)
- 340m, Tommy Johansson, 64.2 (29 June 1980)
- 331m, Tommy Johansson, 65.0 (10 May 1981)
- 331m, Bo Wirebrand, 64.8 (14 June 1981)
- 331m, Shawn Moran, 62.6 (23 August 1981)
- 331m, Per Jonsson, 62.2 (1982)
- 310m, Joakim Karlsson, 59.7 (11 June 1989)
- 310m, Joakim Karlsson, 58.2 (May 1990)
- 310m, Hans Nielsen, 58.2 (10 June 1990)
- 285m, Magnus Jonsson, 58.3 (August 1985)
- 285m, Kenneth Nyström, 57.9 (17 August 1985)
- 286m, Peter Karlsson, 58.8 (31 July 1986)
- 286m, Peter Karlsson, 58.6 (31 July 1986)
- 286m, Henka Gustafsson, 57.7 (13 August 1987)
- 290m, Jörgen Hultgren, 59.1 (25 April 1992)
- 290m, Mark Loram, 58.9 (5 May 1992)
- 290m, Jörgen Hultgren, 58.6 (25 June 1992)
- 290m, Per Jonsson, 58.6 (25 June 1992)
- 290m, Henka Gustafsson, 58.3 (2 May 1993)
- 290m, Sam Ermolenko, 58.0 (8 June 1993)
- 296m, Tomasz Jędrzejak, 55.4 (2013)
- 296m, Nicki Pedersen, 55.1 (20 August 2018)

== Track dimension changes ==
- 340m, (1972, 1979)
- 331m, (1981–1982)
- 285m, (1985)
- 286m, (1986–1987)
- 310m, (1990–1996)
- 296m, (2000–2013)

Stats
