= Team Bikab =

Swedish motorcycle speedway team

Club information
- Track address: Ikarosstadion
- Country: Sweden
- Founded: 2003
- Closed: 2010
- Website: Official site of Ikaros Smederna

Club facts
- Colours: Red, Black and White
- Track size: 335 metres

Major team honours
Swedish third tier (Div 1)	2005

Team Bikab was a motorcycle speedway team in Eskilstuna, Sweden from 2003 to 2010.

== History ==
The team was founded in 2003 and was a farm team to Elitserien club Smederna. They effectively replaced a club called Torshälla SK who were the previous farm team to Smederna.

The real name of the club was Smederna Ungdom and the name Team Bikab came from the major sponsor, a company called Bikab AB. This company had previously sponsored Torshälla SK.

In 2003, Team Bikab entered the second tier of the Swedish Speedway Team Championship, known as the Allsvenskan but they finished last of six clubs.

The following season in 2004, Team Bikab competed in the third tier of Swedish speedway (known as Division 1) and placed third but they claimed their first honours in 2005, when they won the division and were promoted back to the Allsvenskan.

From 2006 to 2007 the club competed in the Allsvenskan, finishing 6th and 8th respectively. Another stint in the third tier ensued from 2008 to 2009 before parent club Smederna ran into financial difficulties resulting in a merger with Team Bikab, they became Ikaros Smederna for the 2010 season.
