= Alf Jonsson =

Swedish motorcycle speedway rider

- Born: 12 November 1934; Målilla, Sweden
- Nationality: Swedish

Career history

Sweden
- 1954–1960, 1973: Dackarna

Great Britain
- 1960: Southampton Saints

Team honours
- 1960+: World Team Cup
- 1957, 1958, 1959: Swedish league championship

Alf Folke Jonsson (born 12 November 1934) is a former motorcycle speedway rider from Sweden. He earned ten international caps for the Sweden national speedway team.

== Biography ==
Jonsson began his speedway career racing for Dackarna during the 1954 Swedish speedway season. He was part of the Dackarna team that secured three consecutive league championships from 1957 to 1959.

In 1959, Jonsson qualified for the European Final as part of the 1959 Individual Speedway World Championship. His performances that year were noticed by the British teams and Southampton Saints signed him.

Jonsson only rode a couple of British leagues matches for Southampton during the 1960 Speedway National League season because he suffered a broken leg in just his second match for the club.

Jonsson's injury came at the worst time because he had just helped Sweden win the 1960 Speedway World Team Cup semi final and would have been in the team that won the World Cup final but had to be replaced by Björn Knutson. The injury effectively ended his career because he did not ride again.

Key

+injured for final
