= Smedstadion =

Stadium in Eskilstuna, Sweden

- Location: Gröndals Motorstadion, 635 11 Eskilstuna, Sweden
- Coordinates: 59°25′00″N 16°22′33″E
- Capacity: 16,000
- Operator: Smederna Motorcycle speedway
- Opened: 27 April 2002
- Length: 0.335 km (0.208 mi)
- Race lap record: 56.8 sec (Dan Bewley, (Eng), 2022)

Eskilstuna Motorstadion, also known as Smedstadion or Gröndals Motorstadion is a motorcycle speedway stadium located outside of Eskilstuna, Sweden. The stadium was opened in 2002 and is the home arena of Elitserien team Smederna who compete in the Swedish Speedway Team Championship.

== History ==
The stadium was opened on 27 April 2002. The stadium was formerly known as Ikarosstadion from 2008 to 2009 due to sponsorship reasons from the company Ikaros.

The stadium has hosted a World Championship round called the Speedway Grand Prix of Sweden in 2005, 2006 and 2007 and the Swedish Individual Speedway Championship in 2002.

The track record was broken in 2019 by Polish rider Kacper Woryna (57.2 sec) but it was bettered again in 2022 by Dan Bewley, who recorded 56.8 sec.
