= Andreas Messing =

Swedish speedway rider

- Born: 28 January 1987 (age 39); Hallstavik, Sweden
- Nationality: Swedish

Career history

Sweden

Great Britain
- 2006-2007: Arena Essex/Lakeside
- 2008: Coventry

Denmark
- 2005: Outrup

Andreas Messing (born 28 January 1987) is a former motorcycle speedway rider from Sweden.

== Speedway career ==
In 2002, Messing debuted with Rospiggarna in Elitserien in 2002, at the time the youngest ever. He also rode for Vargarna and Getingarna. He got his breakthrough in 2005, aged 18, when he placed ninth in the Swedish Championships.

Messing rode in the top tier of British Speedway riding for the Coventry Bees during the 2008 Elite League speedway season. He began his British career riding for Arena Essex Hammers in 2006.
