= Motala Arena =

Stadium in Motala, Sweden

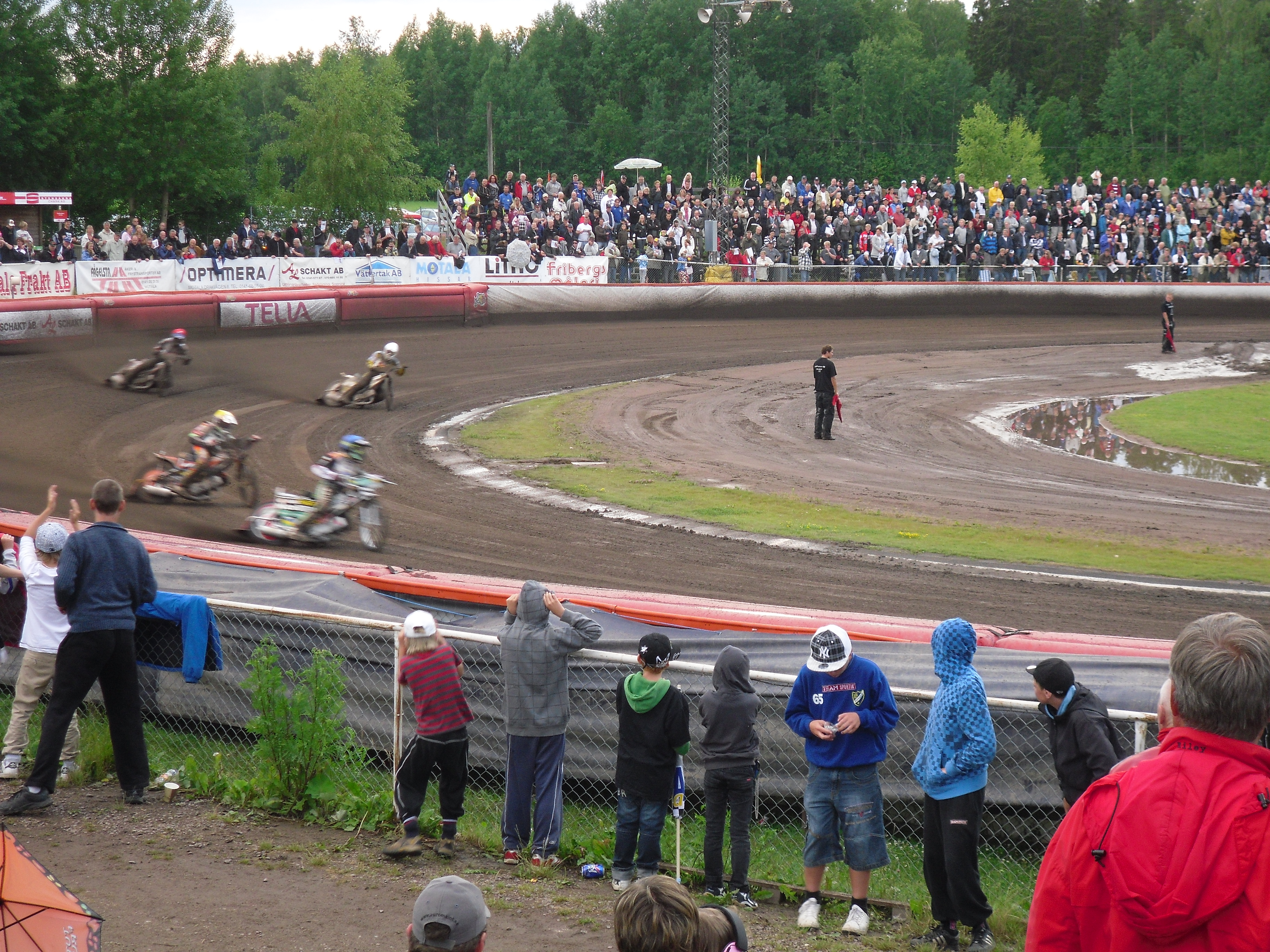
- Location: Vinnerstadsvägen, 591 45 Motala, Sweden
- Coordinates: 58°31′29″N 15°04′30″E
- Capacity: 8,000
- Owner: Motala municipality
- Operator: Piraterna motorcycle speedway
- Opened: 1972
- Length: 0.291 km (0.181 mi)

Motala Arena or Autoexperten Arena for sponsorship purposes is a motorcycle speedway track located in the southern outskirts of Motala. The track is on the Vinnerstadsvägen road and forms part of the Dunteberget Motorstadion, which includes motocross and a smaller speedway track inside the standard track.

The stadium hosts the Piraterna speedway team that compete in the Swedish Speedway Team Championship and have been champions of Sweden on two occasions.

== History ==
The stadium opened in 1972 and hosted significant speedway events such as a qualifying event for the World Championship from 1979 to 1983 and the semi final of the Junior European Championship in 2001.

Arguably its most valuable events held were the Swedish Individual Speedway Championship in 2006 and in 2009 and 2010, it hosted the semi final of the World Championship qualifying known as the Grand Prix Challenge.

The record attendance was 6,800 on 4 September 2011.

In 2023, the track changed its name again (for sponsorship reasons) from the RMV SKOG Arena to the Autoexperten Arena. Also during 2023, questions arose over whether the Piraterna team would use the track in 2024 but eventually they came to an agreement with the Motala municipality to continue racing there.

== Track records ==
- 291m Jonas Davidsson, 55.90 seconds, 7 June 2016
