= 1948 Swedish speedway season =

Motorcycle racing competition

The 1948 Swedish speedway season was the inaugural season of motorcycle speedway in Sweden, in terms of an organised league system. The individual championship would not be introduced until the following season.

== Team ==
=== Team Championship ===
Filbyterna won the first league known as the Dirt Track League and they were declared the first winners of the Swedish Speedway Team Championship.

The Swedish teams were inspired by British speedway, including the taking of nicknames. There were seven teams in the first league SMK Stockholm, Motorsällskapet Stockholm, Vendelsö MK (Stockholm), Nyköping MS, SMK Östgöta, Linköping MK and Kumla MSK.

Continuing the British speedway model some of the teams took nicknames, SMK Östgöta became Vargarna (the Wolves), Kumla became Indianerna (the Indians), Linköping became Filbyterna.

Dirt track
Pos	Team	P	W	L	Pts	Diff
1	Filbyterna	6	5	1	10	108
2	SMK Stockholm	6	5	1	10	65
3	Vargarna	6	4	2	8	
4	Indianerna	6	3	3	6	
5	Motorsällskapet	6	2	4	4	
6	Nyköping	6	2	4	4	
7	Vendelsö	6	0	6	0	

== See also ==
- Speedway in Sweden
