= Hisstech AB Arena =

Stadium in Hallstavik, Sweden

- Location: Hisstech AB Arena; Kusbyvägen 45, 763 35; Hallstavik, Sweden
- Coordinates: 60°03′21″N 18°36′52″E
- Capacity: 10,000
- Length: 289 m (0.180 mi)

The Hisstech AB Arena, formerly the Credentia Arena for sponsorship purposes is a 10,000-capacity Motorcycle speedway and Ice speedway stadium in Hallstavik, Sweden. At the venue there is also an 80cc track inside the larger track and an adjacent BMX track.

== History ==
The origins of the track started with a team called Orion, who first raced at Folkets Park on 15 April 1934. Orion raced intermittently over the next five decades, in which time they purchased the track and buildings. In 1978, the team changed its name to Rospiggarna and the stadium was known as the Orionparken. In 2010, Rospiggarna and MK Orion split and the stadium became known as Parken.

It was also known as the Carl Wahren Arena for two years.

The stadium was used as the venue for the World Championship round; the Speedway Grand Prix of Sweden in 2018 and 2019. The Arena is also the home venue of the speedway team called Rospiggarna who race in the Eliserien. The speedway track has a circumference of 289 metres.

The track record was broken by Joonas Kylmäkorpi who recorded 55.1 sec on 8 June 2004. It has since been bettered by Szymon Woźniak who recorded 55.05 sec on 27 July 2021.

In 2019, the stadium changed its name from the HZ Bygg Arena to the Credentia Arena, following sponsorship from the construction and property company Credentia.

In 2024, the stadium received a new sponsor resulting in a new stadium name; the Hisstech AB Arena after the lift maintenance company.

== Names ==
- 1934–2009 (Orionparken)
- 2010–2010 (Parken)
- 2011–2012 (Carl Wahren Arena)
- 2013–2015 (Parken)
- 2016–2019 (HZ Bygg Arena)
- 2019–2023 (Credentia Arena)
- 2024–present (Hisstech AB Arena)

== See also ==
- Speedway Grand Prix of Sweden
