= Kumla Motorstadion =

Stadium in Kumla, Sweden

- Location: Kumla Motorstadion, Kungsleden 50, 692 92 Kumla, Sweden
- Coordinates: 59°05′19″N 15°09′15″E
- Capacity: 15,000
- Opened: 1946
- Length: 0.375 km

The Kumla Motorstadion, formerly the Glottra Skog Arena for sponsorship reasons and also referred to as Sannaheds is a 15,000-capacity motorcycle speedway stadium, south of Kumla in Sweden.

The Arena is the home venue of the speedway team called Indianerna who race in the Eliserien, which is the highest league in Swedish speedway.

The primary 500c track measures 375 metres in circumference, while a smaller 80cc track is 175 metres.

The stadium called the (Kumla Motorstadion) at the time, was built in 1946 and attracted 23,000 to the first meeting on 16 June 1946. The venue also staged ice racing speedway. The track staged the 1953 Continental Speedway Final which formed part of the 1953 Individual Speedway World Championship and then hosted international meetings.

The venue also staged the 1992 Speedway World Team Cup final.
