= Göte Olsson =

Swedish speedway rider

- Born: 7 September 1930; Hardemo, Örebro län, Sweden
- Died: 17 March 1998 (aged 67); Kumla kommun, Örebro län, Sweden
- Nationality: Swedish

Career history
- 1949-1957: Indianerna

Individual honours
- 1952: Swedish Championship

Göte Olsson (7 September 1930 to 17 March 1998) was an international speedway rider from Sweden.

== Speedway career ==
Born in Kumla, Olsson was one of speedway's leading riders during the 1950s. He was the champion of Sweden, winning the Swedish Championship in 1952 at the age of 22.

Bristol Bulldogs signed Olsson to race in Britain for the 1953 Speedway National League but a work permit was never issued due to opposition from the Swedish authorities. Despite a subsequent appeal, Olsson never got to ride in the British leagues. He was however allowed to tour Britain that year as part of the Swedish national team.

A memorial race is held in Olsson's memory.
