= Olle Segerström =

Swedish motorcycle speedway rider (1927–2013)

- Born: 6 June 1927; Valö, Stockholm, Sweden
- Died: 18 July 2013 (aged 86)
- Nationality: Swedish

Career history

Sweden
- 1949: Kuggarna
- 1950: Griparna
- 1951–1954: Smederna
- 1955–1957, 1959–1960: Kaparna
- 1958: Vargarna
- 1961: Piraterna

Great Britain
- 1953: Belle Vue Aces

Anders Olof Segerström (6 June 1927 – 18 July 2013) was a Swedish motorcycle speedway rider. During his speedway career he rode as Olle Segerström. He earned two international caps for the Sweden national speedway team.

== Biography ==
Segerström, born in Valö, Stockholm, rode for Kuggarna and then Griparna and Smederna in the Swedish Speedway Team Championship before being signed to ride in Britain. He only rode one season in Britain, when riding for Belle Vue Aces during the 1953 Speedway National League season, averaging a disappointing 2.00 from just four matches.

Segerström had however raced with the first Swedish team to tour Britain in 1951 and was subject to a failed attempt by Stoke Potters to secure his services in 1952. He later reached the Championship round of the 1953 Individual Speedway World Championship and 1954 Individual Speedway World Championship.

Segerström continued to race in Sweden, spending five years with Kaparna from 1955 to 1960 and a season with Piraterna in 1961.

Segerström died on 18 July 2013, at the age of 86.
