= Bert Lindarw =

Swedish speedway rider (1930–2020)

- Born: July 1930; Sweden
- Died: 17 November 2020 (aged 90); Eskilstuna, Sweden
- Nationality: Swedish

Career history
- 1950: Monarkerna
- 1951-1954: Smederna
- 1955-1957: Indianerna
- 1958-1960, 1968: Vargarna
- 1961-1962: Getingarna

Individual honours
- 1957, 1961: World Long Track finalist
- 1953: Swedish Championship silver medal
- 1952: Swedish Championship bronze medal

Team honours
- 1960: Allsvenskan Champion
- 1962: Allsvenskan Div 2 Champion

Bert Lindarw (1930–2020) was an international speedway rider from Sweden.

== Speedway career ==
Lindarw was twice a finalist at the Individual Speedway Long Track World Championship in 1957 and 1961. He won a silver medal (1953) and one bronze medal (1952) at the Swedish Individual Speedway Championship.

Lindarw rode in Sweden for the Smederna Blacksmiths.

== Family ==
Lindarw's son is Christer Lindarw.
