= Åke Andersson (speedway rider) =

Swedish speedway rider

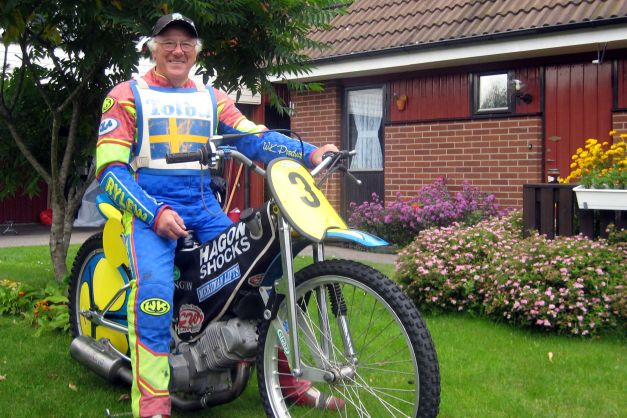
- Ake Andersson, 2007
- Born: 14 November 1936 (age 90); Rödjenäs, Sweden
- Nationality: Swedish

Career history

Sweden
- 1955, 1957-1964, 1971-1978: Dackarna
- 1957: Getingarna
- 1965-1968: Njudungarna
- 1969-1970: Lejonen
- 1979, 1981-1982: Brassarna
- 1986: Skepparna

Great Britain
- 1968: Glasgow Tigers

Team honours
- 1958, 1959, 1962: Allsvenskan Champion
- 1966: Allsvenskan Div 2 Champion
- 1971, 1972: Allsvenskan Div 2 East Champion

Åke Andersson (born 14 November 1936) is a former international motorcycle speedway rider from Sweden. He earned seven caps for the Sweden national speedway team. He is not to be confused with Lars-Åke Andersson, another Swedish international rider from the same time period.

== Speedway career ==
Andersson earned seven caps for Sweden and rode in the top tier of British Speedway in 1968, riding for Glasgow Tigers.

Between 2004 and 2006, Andersson was a mechanic and advisor to Thomas H. Jonasson.
