= Dan Forsberg =

Swedish speedway rider

- Born: 25 March 1934 (age 92); Vaggeryd, Sweden
- Nationality: Swedish

Career history

Sweden
- 1950-1954, 1958-1959: Vargarna
- 1955-1956: Filbyterna
- 1957: Dackarna

Great Britain
- 1952-1953, 1957: Birmingham Brummies

Individual honours
- 1952, 1957: Speedway World Championship finalist
- 1953, 1956: Nordic Champion

Team honours
- 1951, 1953, 1954, 1957: Allsvenskan Champion

Dan O. Forsberg (born 25 March 1934) is a former international motorcycle speedway rider from Sweden. He earned 17 caps for the Sweden national speedway team.

== Speedway career ==
Forsberg was a leading speedway rider in the late 1950s. He reached the final of the Speedway World Championship on two occasions,in the 1952 Individual Speedway World Championship and the 1957 Individual Speedway World Championship.

Forsberg rode in the top tier of British Speedway, riding for Birmingham Brummies, where he rode from 1952 to 1953 and again in 1957.

== World final appearances ==
=== Individual World Championship ===
- 1952 - (England) London, Wembley Stadium - 6th - 9pts
- 1957 - (England) London, Wembley Stadium - 15th - 2pts

== Family ==
Forsberg's grandson Billy rode for Belle Vue Aces from 2007 to 2009.
