= Swedish Speedway Team Championship =

Swedish motorcycle speedway championship

- Sport: speedway
- Founded: 1950
- Country: Sweden
- Most recent champion: Dackarna
- Most titles: Getingarna (16)
- Website: Official site

The Swedish Speedway Team Championship is the team championship of speedway in Sweden.

== History ==
The Championship was introduced in 1950.

In 1982 the Championship was renamed with a new league called the Elitserien being introduced. The second tier of the Championship is known as the Allsvenskan.

Between 1986 and 1999 the team that finished top of the league were declared champions because there was no play-off.

== List of winners ==
Year	Tier one	Tier two	Tier three	Ref
1948	Filbyterna	N/A	N/A	
1949	Vargarna	N/A	N/A	
1950	Filbyterna	Piraterna, Saxarna, Vetlanda	N/A	
1951	Vargarna	Vikingarna, Kaparna	N/A	
1952	Getingarna	Monarkerna	N/A	
1953	Vargarna	Vikingarna	N/A	
1954	Vargarna	N/A	N/A	
1955	Monarkerna	N/A	N/A	
1956	Monarkerna	N/A	N/A	
1957	Dackarna	N/A	N/A	
1958	Dackarna	Örnarna	N/A	
1959	Dackarna	Folkare	N/A	
1960	Vargarna	Filbyterna	N/A	
1961	Vargarna	Kaparna B, Folkare	N/A	
1962	Dackarna	Getingarna	Gamarna	
1963	Getingarna	Örnarna	Dackarna B, Filbyterna	
1964	Getingarna	Vargarna	Taxarna, Kaparna B	
1965	Getingarna	Gamarna	Lejonen, Kaparna B	
1966	Getingarna	Njudungarna	Indianerna	
1967	Getingarna	Indianerna	Dackarna, Smederna	
1968	Kaparna	Lejonen	Dackarna, Filbyterna	
1969	Getingarna	Örnarna	Bysarna, Eldarna	
1970	Kaparna	Bysarna	Filbyterna, Vikingarna	
1971	Bysarna	Dackarna, Smederna	Valsarna	
1972	Bysarna	Dackarna, Indianerna	Gamarna	
1973	Smederna	Indianerna, Kaparna	Piraterna	
1974	Getingarna	Lejonen, Masarna	Jämtarna	
1975	Bysarna	Njudungarna	Gamarna, Piraterna	
1976	Njudungarna	Örnarna	Eldarna, Solkatterna	
1977	Smederna	Skepparna	Gamarna, Brassarna, Vikingarna	
1978	Getingarna	Lejonen	Pilarna, Filbyterna	
1979	Getingarna	Skepparna	Eldarna, Solkatterna	
1980	Getingarna	Kaparna, Piraterna	Pilarna	
1981	Getingarna	Solkatterna, Vargarna	Brassarna	
1982	Getingarna	Solkatterna, Kaparna	Lindarna, Brassarna	
1983	Getingarna	Gamarna, Vargarna	Eldarna, Filbyterna	
1984	Kaparna	Solkatterna	Vikingarna, Lejonen	
1985	Getingarna	Bysarna	Tuna Rebels, Piraterna	
1986	Vetlanda	Dackarna	Valsarna, Skepparna	
1987	Vetlanda	Gamarna	Griparna, Brassarna	
1988	Bysarna	Rospiggarna	Solkatterna, Filbyterna	
1989	Stockholm United	Smederna	Valsarna, Kaparna	
1990	Indianerna	Skepparna	Masarna, Korparna	
1991	Indianerna	Dackarna	Kaparna	
1992	Örnarna	Smederna	Stockholm, Zaags	
1993	Örnarna	Valsarna	Korparna, Husarerna	
1994	Örnarna	Rospiggarna	Team Viking, Njudungarna	
1995	Rospiggarna	Dackarna	Karlstad, Njudungarna	
1996	Örnarna	Vargarna, Getingarna	N/A	
1997	Rospiggarna	Kaparna, Nässjö	N/A	
1998	Valsarna	Masarna	Team Viking	
1999	Valsarna (E)	Team Svelux (A)	Filbyterna (D2) Piraterna (D3)	
2000	Masarna	Bysarna	Lejonen	
2001	Rospiggarna	Örnarna	Gasarna	
2002	Rospiggarna	Vetlanda	Vikingarna	
2003	Kaparna	Piraterna	Eldarna	
2004	Vetlanda	Örnarna	Skepparna	
2005	Västervik	Hammarby	Team Bikab	
2006	Vetlanda	Kaparna	Solkatterna	
2007	Dackarna	Lejonen	Team Kumla	
2008	Lejonen	Vargarna	Team Dalakraft	
2009	Lejonen	Valsarna	Gnistorna	
2010	Vetlanda	Hammarby	Smederna	
2011	Piraterna	Rospiggarna	Solkatterna	
2012	Vetlanda	Smederna	Smederna B	
2013	Piraterna	Rospiggarna	Griparna/Hammarby	
2014	Vetlanda	Lejonen		
2015	Vetlanda	Masarna		
2016	Rospiggarna	Västervik		
2017	Smederna	Västervik		
2018	Smederna	Piraterna		
2019	Smederna	Griparna		
2020	Masarna	N/A	N/A	
2021	Dackarna	Indianerna B		
2022	Smederna	Valsarna	Indianerna C	
2023	Dackarna	Njudungarna	Masarna	
2024	Lejonen	Solkatterna	Rospiggarna/Masarna	
2025	Västervik	Örnarna	?	

== See also ==
- Elitserien (current highest tier)
- Allsvenskan (current second tier)
- History of motorcycle speedway in Sweden
