= Sune Karlsson =

Swedish speedway rider

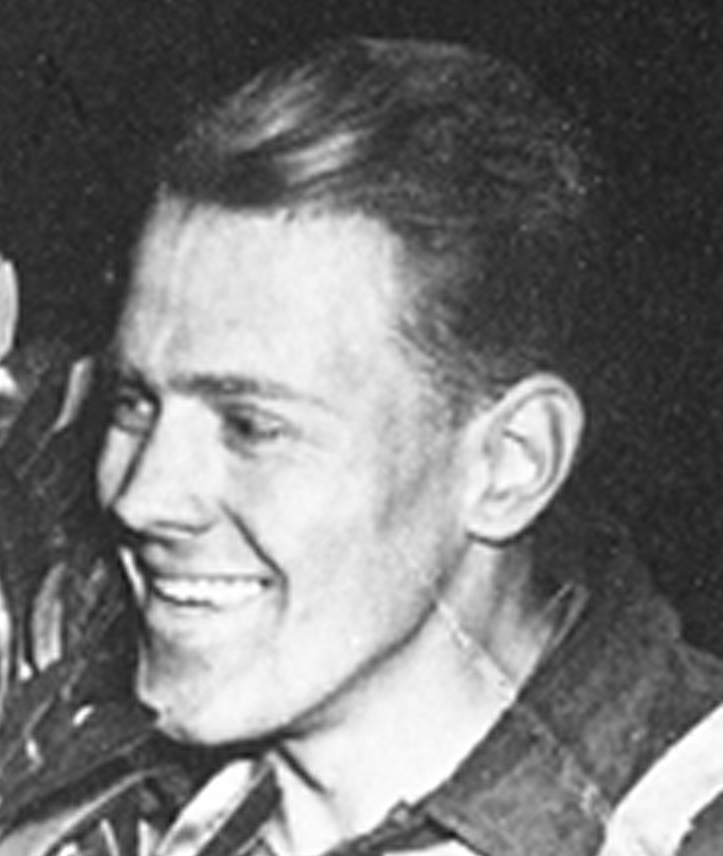
- Born: 7 October 1923; Solna, Sweden
- Died: 21 June 2006 (aged 82); Värmdö, Sweden
- Nationality: Swedish

Career history

Sweden
- 1949-59: Getingarna

Great Britain
- 1952: New Cross Rangers
- 1953: Wimbledon Dons

Individual honours
- 1949, 1952: Swedish Championship silver medal
- 1951: Swedish Championship bronze medal

Team honours
- 1952: Allsvenskan Champion

Sune Wiktor Karlsson (1923–2006) was an international motorcycle speedway rider from Sweden. He earned seven caps for the Sweden national speedway team.

== Speedway career ==
Karlsson won two silver medals (1949 and 1952) and one bronze medal (1951) at the Swedish Individual Speedway Championship.

Karlsson rode in the top tier of British Speedway in 1952, riding for New Cross Rangers.
