= Kaparna =

Swedish speedway team

Club information
- Track address: various venues in Gothenburg
- Country: Sweden
- Founded: 1949
- Closed: 2007

Club facts
- Nickname: The Hijackers

Major team honours
League champions	1968, 1970, 1984, 2003
second division winners	1951, 1961 (B*), 1973, 1980, 1982, 1997, 2006
third division winners	1964 (B*), 1965 (B*), 1989, 1991 (B*)=B team

Kaparna were a Swedish motorcycle speedway team that competed in the Swedish speedway leagues from 1949 to 2007. The team were last based at the Arendal Speedway Track, in Arendal, west of Gothenburg on the island of at Hisingen in Sweden. They were four times league champions of Sweden.

== History ==
=== 1934 to 1957 ===
A speedway track called the Sävedalsbanan was constructed to the east of Gothenburg in 1934. Before World War II it held meetings consisting of individual competition.

In 1949, a team called GEMA Goteborg (Gothenburg Motor Alliance) joined the relatively new Swedish Speedway Team Championship that had been inaugurated the previous season. The team finished 9th during the 1949 Swedish speedway season. The following season in 1950, the team changed its name to Kaparna (the hijackers) and also formed a reserve side known as Gastarna.

The team won their first honours in 1951, when they won Division 2 west. The team won the silver medal in 1955 and again in 1957. Göran Norlén and Kjell Carlsson, Arne Carlsson were two dominant riders for the club during this period, Norlén won the 1953 Swedish Individual Speedway Championship as a Kaparna rider.

In 1958, the club signed one of speedway's greatest riders called Ove Fundin, which also turned out to be the last at the Sävedalsbanan in Sävedalen. In 1959, the team won a third silver medal, while racing initially at the Nya Ullevi and then venues outside of Gothenburg (Vetlanda and Överlida).

=== 1960 to 1967 ===
For the 1960 Swedish speedway season Kaparna began racing at the Nya Ullevi but due to financial reasons chose to move to the new Lindome Motorbana for the 1961 season. During this time Ove Fundin won the Swedish Championship three times and the Kaparna B team won three divisional titles.

=== 1968 to 1972 ===
In 1968 the team won division 1 for the first time in their history. The team included Fundin and Göte Nordin, another of the world's leading riders at the time. Within two years they had repeated the feat, claiming a second title in 1970. Fundin left the club after 1970 and the team suffered relegation, spending their final season at Lindome (1972) in division 2.

=== 1973 to 1993 ===
A return to the Ullevi in 1973 ensued and the club would stay there for 20 years. The period was largely uninspired, with large parts of it spent in division 2. They did however win division 2 on three occasions; mainly due to the efforts of Jan Andersson, who won the Swedish title four times as a Kaparna rider. In 1984 they won the league title for the first time since 1970, with Jan Andersson starring alongside his brother Björn Andersson and Pierre Brannefors. The spell at the Ullevi also saw the team drop out off the 1986 Elitserien and finish last in division 2 south.

=== 1994 to 2007 ===
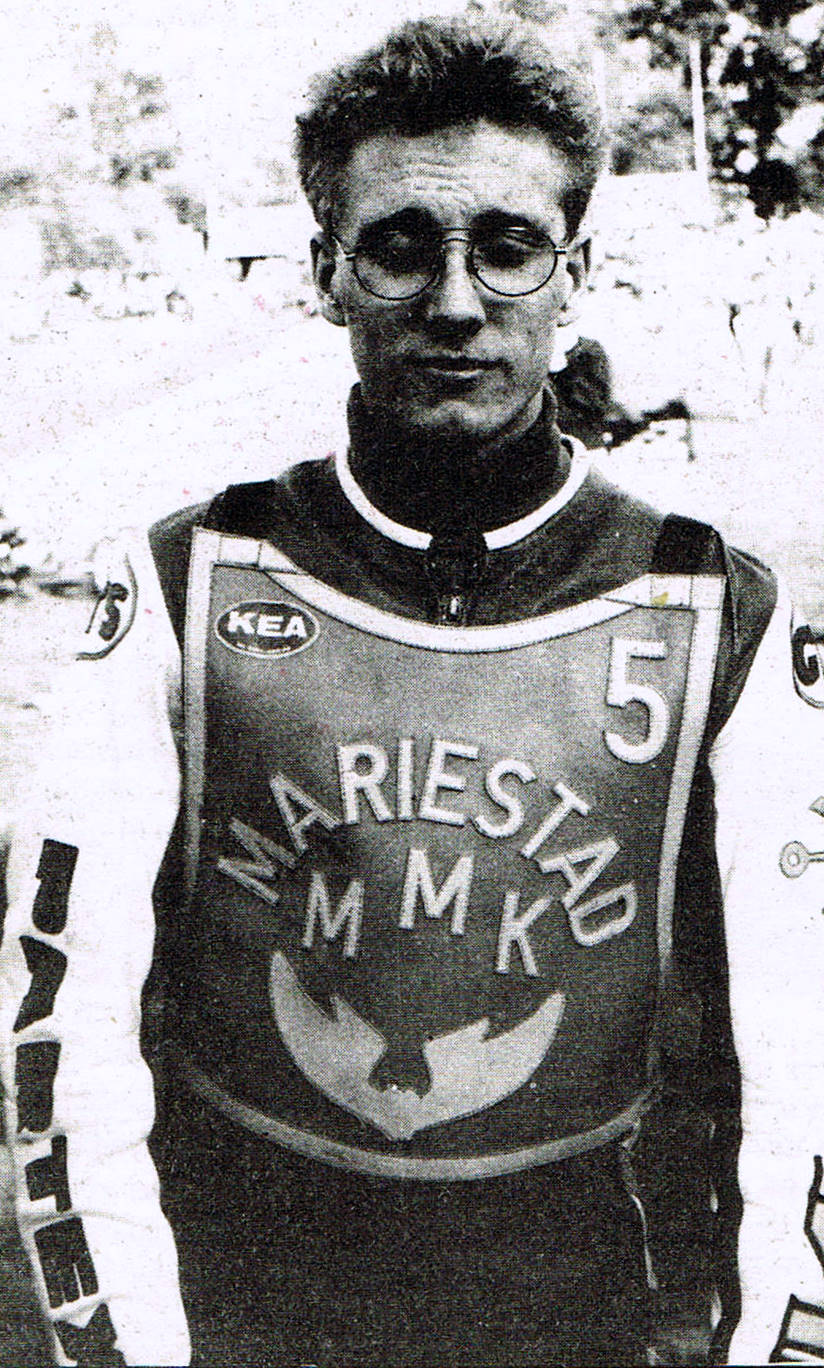
Peter Karlsson

A new track called the Arendalsbanan at Arendal, west of Gothenburg on the island of Hisingen was built in 1994 and the team moved into the track for the 1994 Swedish speedway season. The track measured 336 metres and became a popular venue for the area attracting a 5,940 spectators on 24 September, 2002. Fortunes also improved with the team winning division 1 in 1997 (after signing Australian Ryan Sullivan) and returning to the Elitserien in 1998. In 2001, in addition to competing in the Swedish league they also competed in the Danish Open League during the 2001 Danish speedway season. It was the only time that the Danish league allowed foreign teams to compete.

The team signed Peter Karlsson to help bring back success and when they added Bjarne Pedersen, Joonas Kylmäkorpi and Jaroslaw Hampel, they won the silver medal in 2002. The following season they brought back Ryan Sullivan and won the Swedish Speedway Team Championship for the third time (but first since 1970).

On 24 September 2004, Tony Rickardsson set a track record of 60.1 seconds. The team's success was short lived because they were relegated in 2005 and then worse was to come. despite winning the Allsvenskan in 2006. During the 2007 Swedish speedway season the club were kicked out of the Arendalsbanan and had to ride as a nomadic team racing 'away' all season. The decision was taken to close until they could find a new track but it did not materialise.

== Notable riders ==
- (Sweden) Jan Andersson
- (Sweden) Bengt Brannefors
- (Sweden) Pierre Brannefors
- (Sweden) Arne Carlsson
- (Sweden) Kjell Carlsson
- (Poland) Jaroslaw Hampel
- (Sweden) Bengt Jansson
- (Sweden) Peter Karlsson
- (Finland) Joonas Kylmäkorpi
- (Sweden) Göte Nordin
- (Sweden) Göran Norlén
- (Denmark) Bjarne Pedersen
- (Australia) Ryan Sullivan
