= Elitserien (speedway) =

Swedish motorcycle speedway tier one league

- Sport: Speedway
- Founded: 1982
- No. of teams: 8
- Country: Sweden
- Most recent champion: 2025 - Västervik
- Broadcasters: Sweden: ESS Sport; UK: Premier Sport & FreeSports
- Website: Official site
- 2026

Notes
- Leagues below Allsvenskan; Division One

Elitserien (literally, "The Elite Series") (Swedish: Elitserien i speedway) is the highest league in the league system of speedway in Sweden and currently comprises the top eight Swedish speedway teams. The first season began in 1982. Before that Allsvenskan was the highest division. The winner of the Elitserien is crowned the Swedish Speedway Team Championship winner.

== 2026 clubs ==
Team	City	County or län	Founded	Stadium	Nickname
Dackarna	Målilla	Kalmar County	1929	Skrotfrag Arena	The Tires
Indianerna	Kumla	Örebro County	1936	Glottra Skog Arena	The Indians
Lejonen	Gislaved	Jönköping County	1936	OnePartnerGroup Arena	The Lions
Piraterna	Motala	Östergötland County	1949	Motala Arena	The Pirates
Rospiggarna	Hallstavik	Stockholm County	1930	Credentia Arena	Rospiggarna
Smederna	Eskilstuna	Södermanland County	1951	Smedstadion	The Blacksmiths
Vargarna	Norrköping	Östergötland County	1947	Norrköping Motorstadion	The Wolves
Västervik Speedway	Västervik	Kalmar County	1966	Ljungheden	The Skippers

== History ==
From the start of Swedish league speedway in 1948 until 1981 the highest speedway league in Sweden was called Division 1. In 1982 Elitserien was formed, consisting of only six teams where the top four teams qualified for the playoffs. Getingarna became the first winners after defeating Njudungarna in the finals. The league size was increased to seven teams in 1983 and to eight teams in 1984, a league size that was maintained until the 1996 season when the league expanded to nine teams and then to ten teams the following season. In 1986 the playoffs lost its championship status; instead the winner of the league became the Swedish champions. However, in 2000, playoffs were reintroduced as a championship final.

== Best riders ==
- 2003 - (Sweden) Andreas Jonsson, Rospiggarna
- 2004 - (Denmark) Nicki Pedersen, Smederna
- 2005 - (Sweden) Tony Rickardsson, Masarna
- 2006 - (Denmark) Nicki Pedersen, Hammarby
- 2007 - (Australia) Leigh Adams, Masarna
- 2008 - (Denmark) Nicki Pedersen, Lejonen
- 2009 - (Australia) Jason Crump, Elit Vetlanda
- 2010 - (Norway) Rune Holta, Dackarna
- 2011 - (Sweden) Andreas Jonsson, Dackarna

== Rules ==
A season consists of 18 rounds where all teams meet twice, once home and once away. Scoring 2 points for a win, 1 point for a draw and 0 points for a loss. 1 additional bonus point is awarded the team with the highest rider points aggregate from home and away matches against each team. The six first teams in the league after 18 rounds qualify for the playoffs.

=== Playoffs ===
The playoffs decides the winner of the Swedish Speedway Team Championship. It is run in three rounds; quarter finals, semi finals and final. The first six teams of the main series are split into two quarter final groups with three teams each. The two best teams in the quarterfinal groups qualifies for the semifinals. In the semifinals and the final the teams meet once home and once away. The team with the highest rider points aggregate after two matches goes through to the next round.

=== Squads ===
Each team has a squad of nine riders with an initial match average above 2,00 and an unlimited number of riders with an initial match average of 2,00. In addition most teams has a farm club agreement with a team in another league which makes it possible to farm Swedish riders with an Elitserien initial match average less than or equal to 6,00. A team can use a maximum of two riders from the farm club in each match.

=== Team selection ===
To each match a team has to select seven riders from its squad. The selected team must include at least one Swedish junior rider (under 21). The total initial match average of the team must not exceed 42,00 and not be lower than 35,00. The two riders with the lowest consecutive match average must be placed as reserves in jackets number 6 and 7. An additional reserve can be added to the team in jacket number 8 if the rider is a Swedish junior rider and has a lower consecutive match average than all other riders in the team. The 8th rider has no scheduled rides.

Initial match average In the beginning of each season, each rider in the league is provided an initial match average by the Swedish motorcycle sports association, Svemo. This average remains unchanged throughout the season and is used for team selection.

Calculation of initial match averages From the 2010 season a riders initial match average is equal to the Calculated Match Average of the last season the rider competed in the Swedish league system. Before 2010 the last consecutive match average was used.

The first initial match average for a Swedish rider that has not yet competed in the Swedish league system is 2,00. Foreign riders that has not yet competed for a Swedish team get a first initial match average equal to the rider's last official home league average, bonus points excluded. Since some foreign leagues are not of the same quality as the Swedish leagues the initial match averages for foreign riders are modified by multiplying it to a factor according to the table below. However, a foreign rider cannot be awarded a first initial match average below 5,00.

Factor	League
1,0	British top League, Polish Speedway Ekstraliga
0,7	Polish Speedway First League, Danish Super League, Czech Elite League
0,6	British second League
0,5	Polish Speedway Second League, German Bundesliga, Czech Division 1
0,4	All other leagues

Consecutive match average A rider's consecutive match average is calculated after each match and is used to determine which riders that are allowed to race as reserves in a match. The last consecutive match average of the season becomes the initial match average for the next season.

Calculation of consecutive match average At the start of the season the consecutive match average is equal to the initial match average. The consecutive match average is calculated according to the following formula

$N = \frac{ C * M + ((p * h / 4) - I)} { M}$

Where:
N is the New consecutive match average
C is the Current consecutive match average
M is the total number of league rounds
I is the first consecutive match average of the season. i.e. the Initial match average
p is the total points in the latest match
h is the number of heats the rider participated in during the latest match

The new consecutive match average is rounded down to two decimals.

Example:

A rider has a current consecutive match average (C) on 8,11 and an initial match average (I) on 7,76. In the following match he rides 5 heats (h) scoring 14 points (p). The number of rounds in his league (M) is 12. This leaves the rider with a new consecutive match average on 8,39

$8,3966667 = \frac{ 8,11 * 12 + ((14 * 5 / 4) - 7,76)} { 12}$
