= Göran Norlén =

Swedish speedway rider (1931–2020)

- Born: 3 April 1931
- Died: 20 April 2020 (aged 89)
- Nationality: Swedish

Career history
- 1952–1958: Kaparna
- 1958–1963: Monarkerna
- 1965: Örnarna
- 1965: Dackarna
- 1974: Hjälmarna

Individual honours
- 1953: Swedish Championship

Göran Norlén (1931-2020) was an international speedway rider from Sweden.

== Speedway career ==
Norlén was one of speedway's leading riders during the 1950s; he was the champion of Sweden, winning the Swedish Championship in 1953.
