= Arne Carlsson (speedway rider) =

Swedish speedway rider

- Born: c. 1939; Motala, Sweden
- Nationality: Swedish

Career history

Sweden
- 1956-1963: Kaparna
- 1964-1966, 1968: Getingarna

Great Britain
- 1960: New Cross Rangers
- 1961-1962: Swindon Robins

Individual honours
- 1959, 1962, 1963: Speedway World Championship finalist

Team honours
- 1964, 1965, 1966: Allsvenskan Champion

Arne Carlsson (born c. 1939) is a former international motorcycle speedway rider from Sweden. He earned 17 caps for the Sweden national speedway team.

== Speedway career ==
Carlsson reached the final of the Speedway World Championship on three occasions during the 1959 Individual Speedway World Championship, 1962 Individual Speedway World Championship and 1963 Individual Speedway World Championship.

Carlsson rode in the top tier of British Speedway, riding for New Cross Rangers in 1960 and Swindon Robins from 1961 to 1962.

== World Final Appearances ==
=== Individual World Championship ===
- 1959 - (England) London, Wembley Stadium - 7th - 8pts
- 1962 - (England) London, Wembley Stadium - 13th - 3pts
- 1963 - (England) London, Wembley Stadium - 16th - 1pt
