= Lejonen =

Swedish motorcycle speedway team

Club information
- Track address: Gislaved Motorbana (OnePartnerGroup Arena); Gislaved; Jönköping County; Sweden
- Country: Sweden
- Founded: 1936
- Team manager: Anders Fröjd and Mikael Holmstrand
- Team captain: Vacant
- League: Elitserien
- Website: Official Website

Club facts
- Colours: Black, gold and red
- Track size: 368 metres
- Track record time: 62.2 seconds
- Track record date: 11 June 2024
- Track record holder: Robert Lambert

Major team honours
Team champions	2008, 2009, 2024
silver medal	1971, 1972, 2022
Second Division Champions	1968, 1974, 1978
Third tier Champions	1965, 1984, 2000

Lejonen (lit. 'the Lions') is a motorcycle speedway team from Gislaved in Sweden, who compete in the Elitserien. Their home track is at the Gislaved Motorbana or the OnePartnerGroup Arena for sponsorship purposes, which is Sweden's oldest track still in use. The club are three times champions of Sweden.

== History ==
=== 1929 to 1968 ===
In December 1929 Gislaved Motorclub was formed and by 1931 the track was built. The track was originally 6 metres (20 ft) wide and 400 metres (440 yd) long but in 1936 it was widened to 10 metres (33 ft) and during the 1980s the inside edge of the track was moved and the length was reduced to 380 metres (1,250 ft).

In 1963, Smålands Lejon began racing in Division Three, becoming Lejonen the following season in 1964. During the 1965 Swedish speedway season, the club won their first honours by winning division three A. They were promoted to division 2 and finished 2nd in 1966 and 1967 before winning division 2 in 1968.

=== 1969 to 1982 ===
The club made their debut in the top flight in 1969, finishing 4th.

During the 1971 Swedish speedway season and 1972 Swedish speedway season, the club, led by Jan Simensen, Bo Josefsson and Therje Henriksson finished 2nd and won the silver medal. For the next decade the club found themselves bouncing between the first and second divisions.

=== 1982 to 1989 ===
With the introduction of the Elitserien in 1982, the club were relegated that season and dropped two divisions. Although they gained promotion back to the second tier they struggled to make any challenge in the division and at the end of 1989 the club stopped racing.

=== 1998 to 2010 ===
The team returned for the 1998 Swedish speedway season They won promotion in 2000 to the Allsvenskan and then seven years later, in 2007 won the Allsvenskan defeating Valsarna in the play-off final to gain promotion to the Elitserien for 2008.

During the winter of 2007-08 the track underwent major changes to accommodate Elitserien racing and the club announced the signing of Nicki Pedersen, the 2007 World Champion.

The club became champions of Sweden for two successive years in 2008 and 2009 after they won the Swedish Speedway Team Championship. Pedersen, Chris Holder, David Ruud, Mikael Max and were instrumental in bringing the success to the club.

=== 2011 to present ===
The club were relegated and declared bankrupt in 2011 and dropped to division 1 (the third tier). They slowly recovered to win the Allsvenskan in 2014 and in 2022 won the Elitserien silver medal.

In 2024, the club became champions of Sweden for the third time after winning the Elitserien during the 2024 Swedish speedway season.

== Smålänningarna and Team Dalej ==
Smålänningarna compete in the Allsvenskan and Team Dalej compete in the third tier (division 1), they are a collaboration between Dackarna and Lejonen allowing less senior riders the opportunity to race. The collaboration started in 2020 and the Smålänningarna name came from and old team that had riders from Småland.

== Notable riders ==
- (Sweden) Oliver Berntzon
- (Poland) Mateusz Cierniak
- (Poland) Dominik Kubera
- (Sweden) Hans Danielsson
- (Sweden) Willy Friberg
- (Sweden) Therje Henriksson
- (Australia) Chris Holder
- (Sweden) Bo Josefsson
- (Poland) Dominik Kubera
- (Sweden) Mikael Max
- (Denmark) Nicki Pedersen
- (Sweden) David Ruud
- (Sweden) Jan Simensen
- (Poland) Bartosz Zmarzlik
