= Joel Jansson =

Swedish speedway rider

- Born: 10 July 1924
- Died: 15 February 2018 (aged 93); Eskilstuna
- Nationality: Swedish

Career history
- 1949-1950: Griparna
- 1951-1954: Smederna
- 1955-1956: Indianerna
- 1957-1962: Vargarna

Individual honours
- 1958: Speedway World Championship finalist
- 1958: Continental Champion

Team honours
- 1960, 1961: Allsvenskan Champion

Joel Jansson (10 July 1924 to 15 February 2018) was an international motorcycle speedway rider from Sweden.

== Speedway career ==
While riding ice speedway in Norway during 1957, Jansson badly damaged an arm. However, Jansson reached the final of the Speedway World Championship in the 1958 Individual Speedway World Championship. He rode for Vargarna in Sweden from 1957 to 1962, and was the captain of the Vargarna team from 1958.

== World Final appearances ==
=== Individual World Championship ===
- 1958 – (England) London, Wembley Stadium – 16th - 0pts

== Family ==
Jansson's two sons (Tommy and Bosse) were both speedway riders; tragically Tommy was killed in 1976, during the Swedish final.
