= Rune Sörmander =

Swedish speedway rider (1929–2020)

- Born: 29 November 1929; Växjö, Sweden
- Died: 20 December 2020 (aged 91)
- Nationality: Swedish

Career history

Sweden
- 1949: Smålänningarna
- 1950-1964: Dackarna

Great Britain
- 1953: Wembley Lions
- 1954: Belle Vue Aces
- 1957: Leicester Hunters

Individual honours
- 1955, 1958, 1959: Swedish Championship
- 1953, 1957, 1958, 1959, 1960, 1961, 1962: Speedway World Championship finalist
- 1952: Continental Champion
- 1957: European Champion
- 1958, 1959: Nordic Champion

Team honours
- 1960, 1962, 1963, 1964: World Team Cup Winner
- 1957, 1958, 1959, 1962: Allsvenskan Champion

Rune Bertil Leopold Sörmander (29 November 1929 – 20 December 2020) was an international motorcycle speedway rider from Sweden. He earned 66 caps for the Sweden national speedway team.

== Speedway career ==
Sörmander was one of speedway's leading riders during the 1950s and 1960s, he was a three times champion of Sweden, winning the Swedish Championship in 1955, 1958 and 1959. On 22 June 1952 he won the Continental Speedway Final, which formed part of the 1952 Individual Speedway World Championship.

Sörmander reached the final of the Speedway World Championship on seven occasions (1953, 1957, 1958, 1959, 1960, 1961, 1962) and the final of the Individual Speedway Long Track World Championship three times (1959, 1961, 1962).

Sörmander also helped Sweden win the World Team Cup in 1960, 1962, 1963 and 1964

Sörmander rode in the top tier of British Speedway, riding for various clubs. His last season in Britain was with the Leicester Hunters in 1957. In 1956, he toured South Africa before joining Stockholm Monarchs for a tour of Great Britain.

== World Final appearances ==
=== Individual World Championship ===
- 1953 - (England) London, Wembley Stadium - 11th - 5pts
- 1957 - (England) London, Wembley Stadium - 5th - 11pts + 1pt
- 1958 - (England) London Wembley Stadium - 13th - 4pts
- 1959 - (England) London, Wembley Stadium - 11th - 6pts
- 1960 - (England) London, Wembley Stadium - 12th - 5pts
- 1961 - (Sweden) Malmö, Malmö Stadion - 8th - 7pts
- 1962 - (England) London, Wembley Stadium - 11th - 7pts

=== World Team Cup ===
- 1960 - (Sweden) Gothenburg, Ullevi (with Olle Nygren / Ove Fundin / Björn Knutson) - Winner - 44pts (11)
- 1961 - (Poland) Wrocław, Olympic Stadium (with Sören Sjösten / Ove Fundin / Björn Knutson / Per Tage Svensson) - 2nd - 30pts (4)
- 1962 - (Czechoslovakia) Slaný, Slaný Speedway Stadium (with Björn Knutson / Sören Sjösten / Göte Nordin / Ove Fundin) - Winner - 36pts (3)
- 1963 - (Austria) Vienna, Stadion Wien (with Björn Knutson / Per Olof Söderman / Göte Nordin / Ove Fundin) - Winner - 37pts (3)
- 1964 - (West Germany) Abensberg, Abensberg Stadion (with Björn Knutson / Göte Nordin / Ove Fundin / Sören Sjösten) - Winner - 34pts (7)
