= Dackarna =

Swedish motorcycle speedway team

Club information
- Track address: Skrotfrag Arena; Målilla; Sweden
- Country: Sweden
- Founded: 1929
- Team manager: Mikael Teurnberg
- Team captain: Jacob Thorssell
- League: Elitserien
- Website: Official Website

Club facts
- Colours: Yellow, white and red
- Nickname: The Tires
- Track size: 305 metres
- Track record time: 55.1 seconds
- Track record date: 23 August 2011
- Track record holder: Andreas Jonsson

Major team honours
| Team champions | 1957, 1958, 1959, 1962, 2007, 2021, 2023 |
| Division One Champions | 1986, 1991, 1995 |
| Second Division (East) Champions | 1971, 1972 |
| Third Division (East) Champions | 1967, 1968 |

Dackarna is a motorcycle speedway club from Målilla in Sweden who compete in the Swedish Elitserien. Their home track since 1993 has been the Skrotfrag Arena which was the venue for the Grand Prix of Scandinavia and is the current venue for the Speedway Grand Prix of Sweden. They ride in the Elitserien and are six times champions of Sweden.

== History ==
=== 1935 to 1964 ===
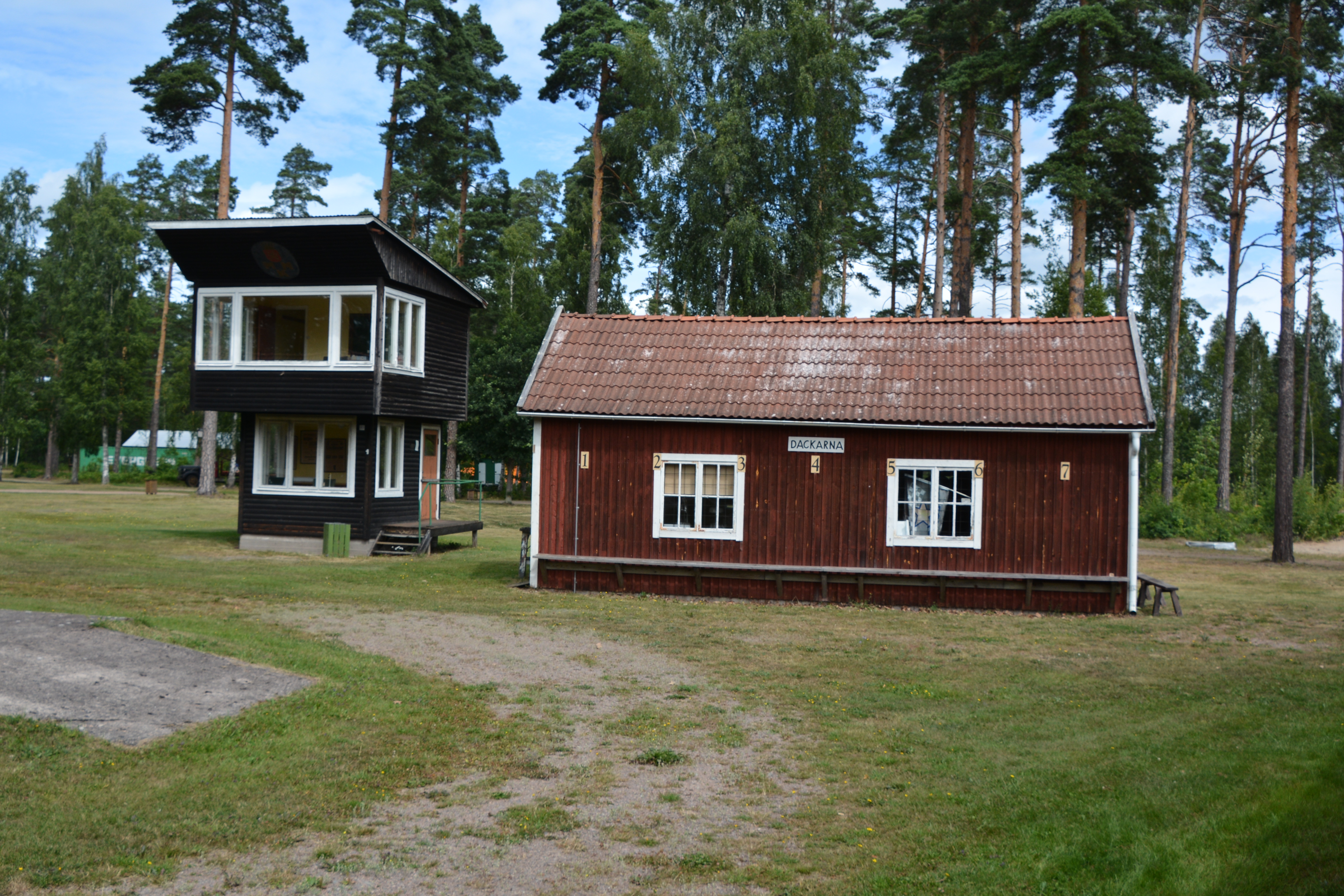
The locker room building and announcer's tower from the Gamla Målilla Motorstadion, moved to the Målilla-Gårdveda Local History Park and converted into a museum

The team was founded in May 1935 as Målilla Motorklubb and in 1949 renamed itself Dackarna (in honour of Nils Dacke) and the club began league racing. The team raced at the Gamla Målilla Motorstadion but in 1956, the team rode their matches at the Växjö Motorstadion.

In 1957, Dackarna won division 1 and were declared the winners of the Swedish Speedway Team Championship for the first time; the team included Rune Sörmander and Dan Forsberg. They then dominated the championship by winning successive titles in 1958 and 1959 before claiming a fourth success in 1962. Riders like Sormander, Per-Tage Svensson and Åke Andersson were instrumental during this period.

=== 1965 to 1996 ===
Dackarna switched between the first and second league for the next 30 years until 1997. Despite a largely quiet period they did win five tier two titles in 1971, 1972, 1986, 1991 and 1995. Tommy Johansson also won the 1973 Swedish title as a Dackarna rider. In 1992, the Gamla Målilla Motorstadion was demolished and a new Målilla Motorstadion opened on 29 June 1993 and Dackarna would become the resident speedway team.

=== 1997 to 2005 ===
When the team received the backing of a major new sponsor (Svelux) and were renamed Team Svelux in 1997. Svelux were taken over by Luxo in 2002 and the team name was changed to Luxo Stars.

=== 2006 to present ===
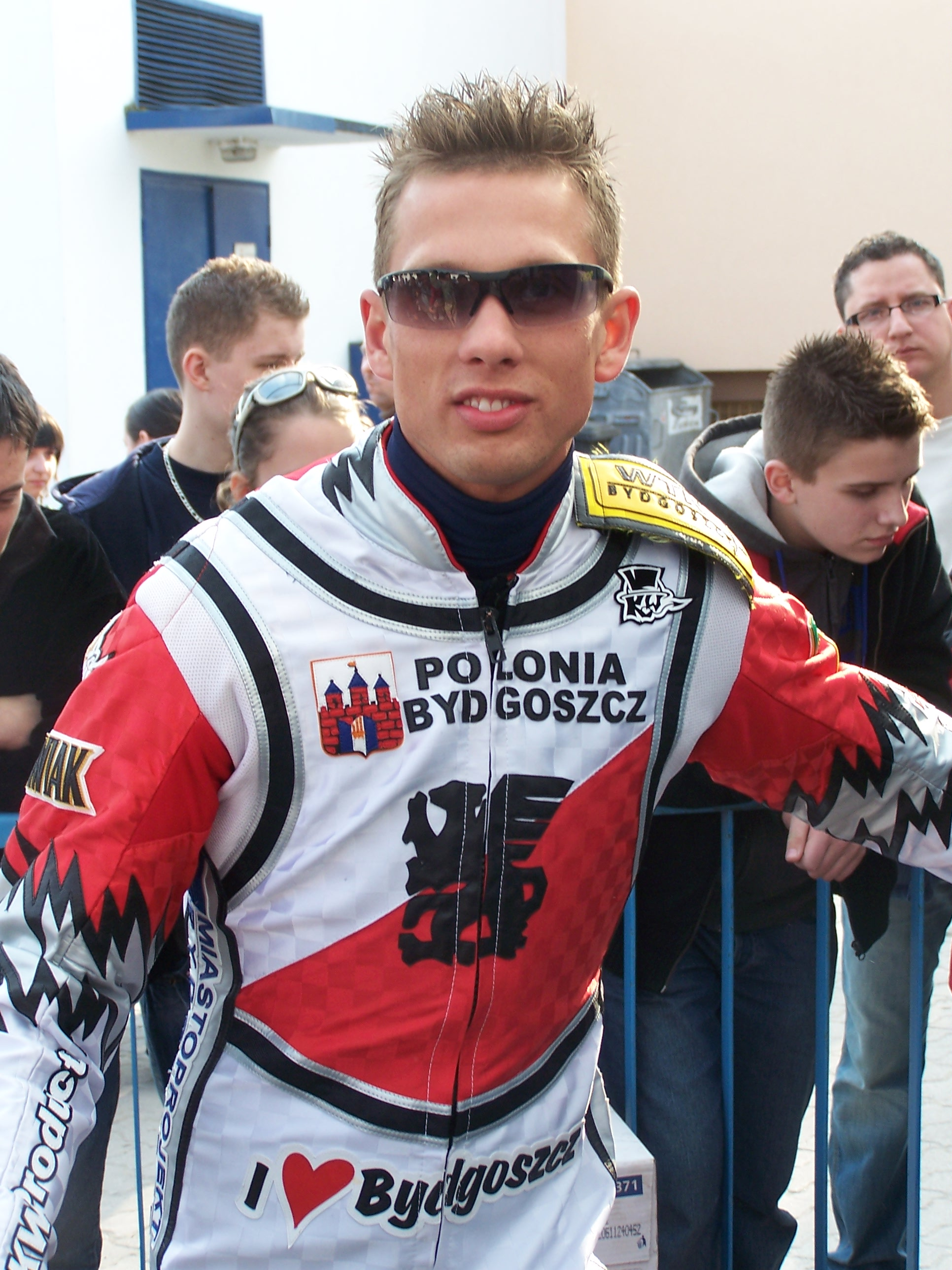
Andreas Jonsson spent 11 years with the club

In 2006, the sponsorship deal expired and the team name reverted to Dackarna. Success soon returned to Dackarna when they won the 2007 Elitserien, after defeating Västervik in the play-off final. The team included Andreas Jonsson, Freddie Lindgren, Hans Andersen and Peter Karlsson.

In 2021, Dackarna became Swedish champions for the sixth time, after defeating Smederna in Eskilstuna. The team included Tai Woffinden, Jason Doyle, Maciej Janowski and Jacob Thorssell.

== Smålänningarna and Team Dalej ==
Smålänningarna and Team Dalej compete in the tiers below the Elitserien and were a collaboration between Dackarna and Lejonen allowing less senior riders the opportunity to race. The collaboration ran from 2020 and the Smålänningarna name came from and old team that had riders from Småland.

== Previous teams ==
Extended content

2019 Team

- (United States) Greg Hancock
- (Sweden) Oliver Berntzon
- (Poland) Maciej Janowski
- (Poland) Kacper Gomolski
- (Poland) Artur Czaja
- (Poland) Patryk Dudek
- (Sweden) Jacob Thorssell
- (Denmark) Nikolaj Busk Jakobsen
- (Sweden) Joel Kling

2020 team

- (Denmark) Frederik Jakobsen
- (Sweden) Oliver Berntzon
- (Poland) Paweł Przedpełski
- (Sweden) Theo Johansson
- (Denmark) Matias Nielsen
- (Sweden) Jacob Thorssell
- (Denmark) Hans Andersen
- (Sweden) Joel Kling
- (Sweden) Avon Van Dyck

2021 Team (Champions)

- (Australia) Jason Doyle
- (United States) Luke Becker
- (Denmark) Frederik Jakobsen
- (Poland) Maciej Janowski
- (Finland) Tero Aarnio
- (England) Tai Woffinden
- (Sweden) Jacob Thorssell
- (Denmark) Rasmus Jensen
- (Sweden) Ricky Kling
- (Sweden) Maximillian Bogdanowic
- (Sweden) Sammy Van Dyck
- (Sweden) Avon Van Dyck
- (Sweden) Theo Johansson

2022 teams 2022 Dackarna team

- (Australia) Brady Kurtz
- (United States) Luke Becker
- (Poland) Maciej Janowski
- (Poland) Mateusz Świdnicki
- (Ukraine) Viktor Trofimiov
- (England) Adam Ellis
- (Sweden) Jacob Thorssell
- (Denmark) Frederik Jakobsen
- (Sweden) Filip Hjelmland
- (Denmark) Nicolai Klindt
- (Denmark) Rasmus Jensen
- (Sweden) Alexander Woentin
- (Sweden) Ludvig Lindgren
- (Sweden) Sammy Van Dyck
- (Sweden) Avon Van Dyck
- (Sweden) Theo Johansson

2022 Smålänningarna team

- (Sweden) Mathias Thörnblom
- (Sweden) Casper Henriksson
- (Denmark) Sam Jensen
- (Poland) Wiktor Jasinski
- (Sweden) Aleks Lundquist
- (Denmark) Jonas Knudsen
- (Poland) Daniel Kaczmarek
- (Poland) Kacper Pludra
- (Poland) Szymon Szlaunderbach
- (Sweden) Avon van Dyck
- (Sweden) Tony Gudbrand
- (Netherlands) Mika Meijer

2023 team

- (England) Dan Bewley
- (Poland) Adrian Gala
- (Sweden) Filip Hjelmland
- (Poland) Maciej Janowski
- (Denmark) Rasmus Jensen
- (Australia) Brady Kurtz
- (Latvia) Andžejs Lebedevs
- (Sweden) Ludvig Lindgren
- (Denmark) Leon Madsen
- (Australia) Sam Masters
- (Sweden) Avon van Dyck
- (Sweden) Sammy van Dyck
- (Sweden) Noel Wahlquist

== Notable riders ==
- (Denmark) Hans Andersen
- (Sweden) Åke Andersson
- (Sweden) Stefan Andersson
- (Australia) Jason Doyle
- (Sweden) Dan Forsberg
- (Poland) Maciej Janowski
- (Sweden) Tommy Johansson
- (Sweden) Andreas Jonsson
- (Sweden) Peter Karlsson
- (Sweden) Anders Kling
- (Sweden) Freddie Lindgren
- (Denmark) Nicki Pedersen
- (Sweden) Rune Sörmander
- (Sweden) Per-Tage Svensson
- (Sweden) Jacob Thorssell
- (England) Tai Woffinden
