= 1959 Individual Speedway World Championship =

14th edition of the World motorcycle speedway championship

Seasons
- ← 1958 1960 →

The 1959 Individual Speedway World Championship was the 14th edition of the official World Championship to determine the world champion rider.

The event was sponsored by the Sunday Pictorial. New Zealand continued their recent domination as Ronnie Moore won his second title with a 15-point maximum and New Zealand won their fourth title in six years. Ove Fundin finished second and defending champion Barry Briggs, returning from retirement won the bronze medal ride off.

== First Round ==
Qualification results.

=== Norwegian round ===
- 25 June 1958
- (Norway) Dælenenga idrettspark, Oslo
- Top 6 (+1 seeded) to Nordic qualification 1959

Pos.	Rider	Points
1	Aage Hansen	15
2	Nils Paulsen	14
3	Reidar Kristoffersen	13
4	Rolf Westerberg	12
5	Roger Steen	11
6	Sverre Harrfeldt	11
7	Tore Svaleng	9
8	Arne Kristiansen	7
9	Kjell Bergh	5
10	Haavard Gulbjornsrud	5
11	Oddvar Kristiansen	5
12	Oystein Mellerud	4
13	Thorbjorn Nygaard	3
14	Per Aulie	3
15	Tore Melbye	2
16	Egil H. Kruke	1

=== Finnish round ===
- 5 October 1958
- (Finland) Turku Hippodrome, Turku
- Top 8 to Nordic qualification 1959

Pos.	Rider	Points
1	Antti Pajari	15
2	Timo Laine	14
3	Kauko Jousanen	13
4	Aulis Tuominen	12
5	Olavi Turunen	11
6	Kalevi Lahtinen	10
7	Antero Salasto	9
8	Pertti Mikkola	6
9	Esko Koponen	6
10	Raimo Kivinen	4
11	Turkka Silvan	3
12	Veikko Kirjonen	3
13	Heikki Sorri	3
14	Valle Seliverstov	3
15	Lasse Mylari	3
16	Reino Niemi	1
17	Martti Assinen (res)	1
18	Pertti Petersohn (res)	0

=== Swedish round ===
- 3 May 1959
- (Sweden) Vetlanda Motorstadion, Vetlanda
- Top 6 to Nordic qualification, 2 to Continental quarterfinal

Pos.	Rider	Points
1	Arne Carlsson	15
2	Björn Knutson	13
3	Joel Jansson	12
4	Rune Sörmander	11
5	Åke Andersson	9
6	Alf Jonsson	9
7	Thorvald Karlsson	9
8	Allan Nilsson	9
9	Göran Carlsson	8
10	Bengt Brannefors	7
11	Evert Andersson	5
12	Per-Tage Svensson	5
13	Bengt Fransson	3
14	Olle Segerström	3
15	Inge Gustavsson	2
16	Olle Andersson	0
17	Gösta Edvardsson	0

- 3 May 1959
- (Sweden) Hammarby IP, Stockholm
- Top 8 to Nordic qualification

Pos.	Rider	Points
1	Ulf Ericsson	12
2	Birger Forsberg	12
3	Göran Norlén	12
4	Bernt Nilsson	12
5	Bengt Eriksson	10
6	Stig Pramberg	10
7	Olle Nygren	9
8	Göte Nordin	8
9	Kjell Wårenius	8
10	Curt Nyqvist	6
11	Kjell Lutteman	4
12	Bert Lindarw	4
13	Bertil Stridh	3
14	Hans Hallberg	3
15	Curt Eldh	3
16	Sune Karlsson	1
17	Sven-Gunnar Karlstén	1

=== Continental quarter-finals ===
Date	Venue	Winner	2nd	3rd
31 May	(Poland) Municipal Stadium, Ostrów	Joachim Maj	Janusz Koscielak	Mieczysław Połukard
31 May	(West Germany) Niederrheinstadion, Oberhausen	Björn Knutson	Florian Kapała	Konstanty Pociejkewicz
31 May	(Czechoslovakia) Pavlovičky Stadion, Liberec	Stefan Kwoczala	Luboš Tomíček Sr.	Richard Janicek
31 May	(Socialist Federal Republic of Yugoslavia) Stražišče Sports Park, Kranj	Miloslav Špinka	Marian Phillip	Karel Průša

== Second round ==
=== Nordic qualification ===
- 24 May 1959
- (Finland) Helsinki Velodrome, Helsinki
- Top 8 to Nordic final

Pos.	Rider	Points
1	Bernt Nilsson	15
2	Ulf Ericsson	14
3	Olle Nygren	13
4	Göran Norlén	11
5	Birger Forsberg	11
6	Kjell Lutteman	9
7	Kalevi Lahtinen	8
8	Aulis Tuominen	8
9	Kauko Jousanen	8
10	Timo Laine	7
11	Curt Nyqvist	6
12	Nils Paulsen	4
13	Bert Lindarw	4
14	Esko Koponen	2
15	Antero Salasto	1
16	Pertti Mikkola	0
17	Torbjörn Nygaard	0

- 24 May 1959
- (Denmark) Selskov Stadium, Hillerød
- Top 6 to Nordic qualification

Pos.	Rider	Points
1	Rune Sörmander	14
2	Arne Carlsson	12
3	Aage Hansen	11
4	Åke Andersson	11
5	Allan Nilsson	10
6	Alf Jonsson	10
7	Arne Pander	9
8	Thorvald Karlsson	9
9	Poul Hansen	8
10	Kurt W Petersen	6
11	Rolf Westerberg	5
12	Erik Kastebo	4
13	Roger Steen	4
14	Sverre Harrfeldt	3
15	Roger Hansen	2
16	Arne Kristiansen	1

=== Continental semi-final ===
- 14 June 1959
- (Czechoslovakia) Slaný Speedway Stadium, Slaný
- Top 8 to Continental final

Pos.	Rider	Points
1	Luboš Tomíček Sr.	13
2	Mieczyslaw Polukard	13
3	Stanislav Svoboda	10
4	Richard Janicek	10
5	Bohumír Bartoněk	10
6	Stefan Kwoczała	10
7	Jaroslav Machac	9
8	Frantisek Irmis	9
9	Joachim Maj	7
10	Stefan Kepa	7
11	Stanislaw Tkocz	7
12	Jan Malinowski	6
13	Henryk Zyto	5
14	Bohumil Rendek	2
15	Jan Koscielak	1
16	Bronislaw Rogal	1

- 15 June 1959
- (Austria) Wiener Stadion, Vienna
- Top 8 to Continental final

Pos.	Rider	Points
1	Konstanty Pociejkewicz	13
2	Florian Kapala	13
3	Björn Knutson	11
4	Pawel Mirowski	11
5	Josef Hofmeister	10
6	Josef Bössner	9
7	Miloslav Špinka	9
8	Zdeněk Dominik	7
9	Karel Průša	5
10	Joel Jansson	5
11	Alfred Aberl	4
12	Jan Kolber	4
13	Göran Carlsson	4
14	Josef Kamper (res)	4
15	Marian Phillip	3
16	Josip Klemencic	2
17	Franz Schenk	2
18	Otto Holoubek (res)	0

== Third round ==
- Ove Fundin - seeded to European Final

=== British & Commonwealth Qualifying ===
- Top 32 riders based on points accumulated progress to British semi-final

Date	Venue	Winner	2nd	3rd
29 June	Wimbledon Stadium	Ron How	George White	Ronnie Moore
2 July	Oxford Stadium	Jack Geran	Neil Street	Brian Hanham
4 July	Hyde Road	Ron Johnston	Ken McKinlay	Peter Craven
4 July	The Firs Stadium	Mike Broadbank	Geoff Mardon	Bob Duckworth
7 July	Banister Court Stadium	Brian Crutcher	Peter Moore	Ron Mountford
10 July	Leicester Stadium	Ken McKinlay	Peter Craven	Ron Johnston
11 July	Brandon Stadium	Brian Crutcher	Ron Mountford	Geoff Mardon
11 July	Abbey Stadium	Mike Broadbank	Les McGillivray	Nigel Boocock
23 July	Wimborne Road	Ronnie Moore	Ron How	Jack Unstead

=== Nordic Final ===
- 31 May 1959
- (Finland) Turku Speedway track, Turku
- First 9 to European Final

Pos.	Rider	Total
1	(Sweden) Rune Sörmander	14+3
2	(Norway) Aage Hansen	14+2
3	(Sweden) Arne Carlsson	12
4	(Sweden) Ole Andersson	11
5	(Sweden) Olle Nygren	9
6	(Sweden) Alf Jonsson	9
7	(Finland) Kalevi Lahtinen	9
8	(Sweden) Ulf Ericsson	8
9	(Sweden) Thorvald Karlsson	7
10	(Finland) Timo Laine	6
11	(Sweden) Göran Norlén	6
12	(Sweden) Birger Forsberg	4
13	(Sweden) Bernt Nilsson	4
14	(Finland) Aulis Lehtonen	3
15	(Finland) Antti Pajari	2
16	(Finland) Turka Sivari	1
17	(Sweden) Kjell Lutteman	0
18	(Finland) Aulis Tuominen	dnr
19	(Sweden) Allan Nillson	dnr

=== Continental Final ===
- 21 June 1959
- (West Germany) BBM Stadium, Munich
- First 6 to European Final

Placing	Rider	Total	1	2	3	4	5	6	7	8	9	10	11	12	13	14	15	16	17	18	19	20	Pts	Pos
1	(West Germany) (14) Josef Hofmeister	15				3		3					3		3							3	15	1
2	(Sweden) (2) Björn Knutson	13	3					2				3				2				3			13	2
3	(Poland) (13) Mieczysław Połukard	13				2	2							3		3					3		13	3
4	(Poland) (9) Florian Kapała	11			3		3						E					3		2			11	4
5	(Poland) (1) Konstanty Pociejkewicz	10	2				1				2				2				3				10	5
6	(Czechoslovakia) (5) Luboš Tomíček Sr.	9		3			0					1					3					2	9	6
7	(Poland) (16) Joachim Maj	8				1				3	3						F			1			8	7
8	(Austria) (15) Josef Bössner	8				0			2			2						2	2				8	8
9	(Czechoslovakia) (11) Jaroslav Machač	7			2				3		0					1						1	7	9
10	(Czechoslovakia) (3) Bohumír Bartoněk	7	1						1				2				2				1		7	10
11	(Poland) (6) Pawel Mirowski	5		0				1			1							1			2		5	11
12	(Czechoslovakia) (4) Miloslav Špinka	4	0							2				2				0				0	4	12
13	(Czechoslovakia) (8) Zdeněk Dominik	4		2						1			1			0			0				4	13
14	(Czechoslovakia) (10) Richard Janicek	4			1			0						1			1		1				4	14
15	(Czechoslovakia) (7) Stanislav Svoboda	2		1					0					0	1					0			2	15
16	(Czechoslovakia) (12) František Irmis	0			0					0		0			0						0		0	16
	(East Germany) (17) Alfred Aberl	0																					0	
Placing	Rider	Total	1	2	3	4	5	6	7	8	9	10	11	12	13	14	15	16	17	18	19	20	Pts	Pos

m - exclusion for exceeding two minute time allowance • t - exclusion for touching the tapes • x - other exclusion • e - retired or mechanical failure • f - fell • ns - non-starter • nc - non-classify

gate A - inside	gate B	gate C	gate D - outside

== Fourth round ==
- Barry Briggs - seeded to World Final

=== British & Commonwealth Semi finals ===
Top 9 riders based on points accumulated over two rides would progress to World final

Date	Venue	Winner	2nd	3rd
10 August	Wimbledon Stadium	Brian Crutcher	Ken McKinlay	Geoff Mardon
11 August	Banister Court Stadium	Ronnie Moore	Cyril Roger	Neil Street
15 August	Hyde Road	Ron How	Peter Moore	Nigel Boocock
15 August	The Firs Stadium	Peter Craven	Brian Crutcher	George White

Pos.	Rider	Points
1	(Australia) Peter Moore	27
2	(England) Peter Craven	26
3	(England) Brian Crutcher	26
4	(New Zealand) Ronnie Moore	25
5	(New Zealand) Geoff Mardon	24
6	(England) Ron How	23
7	(England) George White	23
8	(England) Cyril Roger	21
9	(Australia) Aub Lawson	20
10	(Scotland) Ken McKinlay	20
11	(England) Nigel Boocock	20
12	(Australia) Neil Street	18
13	(England) Arthur Wight	16
14	(England) Gerry Jackson	16
15	(Australia) Jack Geran	15
16	(New Zealand) Ron Johnston	15

Pos.	Rider	Points
17	(New Zealand) Bob Duckworth	14
18	(England) Mike Broadbank	13
19	(England) Ron Mountford	12
20	(Wales) Ian Williams	12
21	(Australia) Chum Taylor	11
22	(England) Jack Unstead	11
23	(Australia) Ray Cresp	8
24	(Scotland) Gordon McGregor	8
25	(England) Bob Andrews	7
26	(England) Charlie Barsby	7
27	(England) Les McGillivray	6
28	(England) Ronnie Genz	6
30	(England) Les Owen	6
31	(England) Alf Hagon	5
32	(England) Dick Bradley	4
33	(England) Cyril Maidment	1

=== European Final ===
- 17 July 1959
- (Sweden) Ullevi, Gothenburg
- First 6 to World final plus 1 reserve

Pos.	Rider	Total	
1	(Sweden) (12) Ove Fundin	14	3,2,3,3,3
2	(West Germany) (4) Josef Hofmeister	13	2,3,2,3,3
3	(Poland) (3) Mieczysław Połukard	12	3,3,2,2,2
4	(Sweden) (16) Rune Sörmander	11	2,1,3,3,2
5	(Sweden) (13) Olle Nygren	10	3,2,3,2,0
6	(Sweden) (8) Arne Carlsson	9	3,0,3,3,t
7	(Poland) (9) Florian Kapała	9	2,3,1,0,3
8	(Sweden) (15) Björn Knutson	7	0,1,1,2,3
9	(Norway) (14) Aage Hansen	7	1,3,0,2,1
10	(Poland) (11) Konstanty Pociejkewicz	6	1,2,2,1,0
11	(Czechoslovakia) (5) Luboš Tomíček Sr.	6	f,1,2,1,2
12	(Sweden) (6) Alf Jonsson	5	f,2,1,1,1
13	(Finland) (10) Kalevi Lahtinen	4	0,1,1,0,2
14	(Czechoslovakia) (7) Miloslav Špinka	3	2,0,0,1,0
15	(Sweden) (1) Åke Andersson	2	1,0,0,0,1
16	(Czechoslovakia) (2) Bohumír Bartoněk	1	0,0,0,0,1
R1	(Sweden) (17) Ulf Ericsson	-	dnr
R2	(Sweden) (18) Thorvald Karlsson	-	dnr

== World Final ==
- 19 September 1959
- (England) Wembley Stadium, London

Placing	Rider	Total	1	2	3	4	5	6	7	8	9	10	11	12	13	14	15	16	17	18	19	20	Pts	Pos
1	(New Zealand) (13) Ronnie Moore	15				3	3							3		3					3		15	1
2	(Sweden) (14) Ove Fundin	13				2		2					3		3							3	13	2
3	(New Zealand) (10) Barry Briggs	11+3			3			1						1			3		3				11	3
4	(Sweden) (16) Olle Nygren	11+2				1				2	3						2			3			11	4
5	(Australia) (6) Aub Lawson	11+1		3				3			2							2			1		11	5
6	(England) (3) Brian Crutcher	10	3						2				2				1				2		10	6
7	(Sweden) (11) Arne Carlsson	8			2				3		1					1						1	8	7
8	(England) (7) Peter Craven	7		0					1					2	2					2			7	8
9	(England) (2) George White	7	1					0				3				2				1			7	9
10	(New Zealand) (4) Geoff Mardon	6	2							3				0				1				E	6	10
11	(Sweden) (5) Rune Sörmander	6		2			1					1					0					2	6	11
12	(Poland) (1) Mieczysław Połukard	5	0				2				0				1				2				5	12
13	(West Germany) (9) Josef Hofmeister	4			0		E						1					3		F			4	13
14	(England) (8) Ron How	3		1						1			E			E			1				3	14
15	(New Zealand) (12) Peter Moore	3			1					0		2			0						0		3	15
16	(England) (15) Cyril Roger	0				0			0			0						0	0				0	16
R1	(Scotland) (R1) Ken McKinlay	0																					0	R1
R2	(Poland) (R2) Florian Kapała	0																					0	R2
Placing	Rider	Total	1	2	3	4	5	6	7	8	9	10	11	12	13	14	15	16	17	18	19	20	Pts	Pos

m - exclusion for exceeding two minute time allowance • t - exclusion for touching the tapes • x - other exclusion • e - retired or mechanical failure • f - fell • ns - non-starter • nc - non-classify

gate A - inside	gate B	gate C	gate D - outside
