= 1954 Individual Speedway World Championship =

9th edition of the World motorcycle speedway championship

Seasons
- ← 1953 1955 →

In the 1954 Individual Speedway World Championship was the ninth edition of the official World Championship to determine the world champion rider.

Ronnie Moore a 21-year-old New Zealander won his first World Championship with a 15-point maximum in front of a 90,000 attendance. He defeated his main rival Olle Nygren in the final heat. Nygren then lost the silver medal ride off to Wembley's teenager Brian Crutcher. Moore's success was made all the more remarkable because he rode the meeting while still recovering from a broken leg. Moore's win made him New Zealand's first ever World Champion in all forms of motor racing.

== Qualification ==
Qualification started on 1 May.

=== Stage 1 ===
==== Norwegian round ====
- 27 September 1953
- (Norway) Lerkendal Stadion, Trondheim
- Top 2 (+2 seeded) to Nordic final 1954

Pos.	Rider	Points
1	Basse Hveem	15
2	Reidar Kristoffersen	14
3	Sverre Gjömesli	13
4	Odd Johansen	9
5	Erling Simonsen	9
6	Anders Röhme	8
7	Oddvar Gundersgaard	8
8	Rolf Solberg	7
9	Rolf Westerberg	7
10	Nils Kristian Paulsen	6
11	Arne Kristiansen	6
12	Gunnar Dyrseth	5
13	Aage Hansen	5
14	Tore Meiner	5
15	Gunnar Hamsaeter	2
16	Aage W. Jensen	1

==== Swedish round ====
- Top 16 to Swedish final

- 1 May 1954
- (Sweden) Dagsbergsfältet, Norrköping

Pos.	Rider	Points
1	Rune Sörmander	15
2	Ove Fundin	12
3	Bertil Carlsson II	10
4	Curt Fredlund	9
5	Georg Duneborn	9
6	Rune Stenström	9
7	Per Olof Söderman	8
8	Dan Forsberg	8
9	Lars Pettersson	7
10	Bert Lindarw	6
11	Olle Heyman	6
12	Bernt Nilsson	6
13	Gunnar Johansson	5
14	Gunnar Karlsson	4
15	Ove Bodin	3
16	Ulf Ericsson	2

- 1 May 1954
- (Sweden) Grevby Motorstadion, Mariestad

Pos.	Rider	Points
1	Olle Nygren	11
2	Olle Segerström	11
3	Allan Nilsson	11
4	Thorsten Carlsson	10
5	Sune Karlsson	10
6	Joel Jansson	10
7	Harry Lindgren	10
8	Evert Hägg	8+3
9	Göte Olsson	8+2
10	Sven Fahlén	7
11	Stig Pramberg	7
12	Birger Forsberg	5
13	Gunnar Hellqvist	4
14	Per-Tage Svensson	2
15	Göran Norlén	2
16	Jan Johnsson	2

=== Stage 2 ===
==== Swedish final ====
- 9 May 1954
- Örebro Motorstadion Adolfsberg, Örebro
- Top 8 to Nordic final, 3 to Continental qualification

Pos.	Rider	Points
1	Olle Nygren	14
2	Göte Olsson	12
3	Ove Fundin	12
4	Rune Sörmander	11
5	Dan Forsberg	10
6	Joel Jansson	10
7	Sune Karlsson	10
8	Georg Duneborn	8
9	Per Olof Söderman	8
10	Olle Segerström	7
11	Rune Stenström	6
12	Thorsten Carlsson	4
13	Allan Nilsson	2
14	Bertil Carlsson II	2
15	Evert Hägg	2
16	Harry Lindgren	1

==== Continental Qualification ====
- 23 May 1954
- Altes Stadion Abensberg, Abensberg
- 8 to Continental semifinal

Pos.	Rider	Points
1	(Sweden) Kjell Carlsson	14+3
2	(Austria) Josef Kamper	14+2
3	(West Germany) Josef Hofmeister	14+1
4	(Austria) Fritz Dirtl	11
5	(West Germany) Albin Siegl	11
6	(Netherlands) Thei Bisschops	9
7	(Austria) Karl Killmeyer	9
8	(Austria) Josef Seidl	7
9	(Sweden) Sven Skoglund	5
10	(Austria) Franz Aigner	5
11	(West Germany) Fred Aberl	4
12	(Socialist Federal Republic of Yugoslavia) Nicola Snjaric	4
13	(Austria) Leopold Killmeyer	3
14	(West Germany) Sebastian Wiesent	3
15	(West Germany) Karl Kiendl	3
16	(Socialist Federal Republic of Yugoslavia) Valentin Medved	0

=== Stage 3 ===
==== Nordic Final ====
- 3 June 1954
- (Norway) Dælenenga idrettspark, Oslo
- First 8 to Continental final

Pos.	Rider	Points
1	(Sweden) Olle Nygren	15
2	(Sweden) Rune Sörmander	14
3	(Sweden) Georg Duneborn	12
4	(Sweden) Sune Karlsson	10
5	(Sweden) Dan Forsberg	10
6	(Sweden) Ove Fundin	9
7	(Sweden) Göte Olsson	9
8	(Sweden) Joel Jansson	9
9	(Norway) Reidar Kristoffersen	7
10	(Denmark) Kiehn Berthelsen	6
11	(Denmark) Leif Bech	6
12	(Norway) Aage Hansen	5
13	(Norway) Werner Lorentzen	4
14	(Finland) Simo Ylänen	2
15	(Finland) Kaukko Jousanen	1
16	(Norway) Erling Simonsen	1

==== Continental semi-final ====
- 13 June 1954
- (West Germany) Niederrheinstadion, Oberhausen
- 8 to Continental final

Pos.	Rider	Points
1	(Sweden) Kjell Carlsson	14
2	(West Germany) Albin Siegl	12
3	(England) Bill Kitchen	11
4	(Sweden) Sven Skoglund	11
5	(West Germany) Josef Hofmeister	10
6	(Sweden) Olle Segerström	8
7	(England) Jack Parker	8
8	(Austria) Josef Seidl	8
9	(Austria) Karl Killmeyer	7
10	(Netherlands) Jan Kesselmans	7
11	(Sweden) Per Olof Söderman	5
12	(Netherlands) Hans van der Sluis	5
13	(Netherlands) Tonny Kroeze	4
14	(Netherlands) Thei Bisschops	4
15	(Netherlands) Gerrit Kops	2
16	(Netherlands) H. van Rijswijk	1

=== Stage 4 ===
==== British round ====
- Top 24 to Championship Round

Date	Venue	Winner
1 July	Foxhall Stadium	Tommy Miller
1 July	Oxford Stadium	Peter Robinson
5 July	County Ground Stadium	Goog Hoskin
5 July	Wimborne Road	Ken Middleditch
6 July	Banister Court Stadium	Charlie May
8 July	Pennycross Stadium	Brian McKeown
9 July	Knowle Stadium	Dick Bradley
9 July	Leicester Stadium	Ken McKinlay
9 July	The Stadium, Motherwell	Derek Close
10 July	Brandon Stadium	Ernie Brecknell
10 July	Old Meadowbank	Ken McKinlay
10 July	Rayleigh Weir Stadium	Peter Clark
10 July	Abbey Stadium	Bob Roger

==== Continental Final ====
- 20 June 1954
- (Sweden) Ryd Motorstadion, Linköping
- First 8 to Championship Round

Pos.	Rider	Points
1	(Sweden) Ove Fundin	14
2	(Sweden) Rune Sörmander	14
3	(Sweden) Sune Karlsson	12
4	(Sweden) Olle Nygren	10
5	(Sweden) Kjell Carlsson	9
6	(Austria) Fritz Dirtl	9
7	(Sweden) Joel Jansson	9
8	(Sweden) Olle Segerström	9
9	(England) Bill Kitchen	8
10	(Sweden) Dan Forsberg	7
11	(Sweden) Göte Olsson	6
12	(South Africa) Fred Lang	4
13	(Sweden) Georg Duneborn	3
14	(Sweden) Sven Skoglund	3
15	(Sweden) Thorsten Carlsson	2
16	(Austria) Josef Kamper	1
17	(Sweden) Per Olof Söderman	1

=== Stage 5 ===
==== Championship Round ====
- Top 16 qualify for World final, 17th & 18th reserves for World final

Date	Venue	Winner
14 August	Hyde Road Stadium	Peter Craven
14 August	Perry Barr Stadium	Jack Young
16 August	Wimbledon Stadium	Barry Briggs
18 August	Harringay Stadium	Split Waterman
21 August	The Firs Stadium	Aub Lawson
26 August	Wembley Stadium	Edie Rigg
31 August	West Ham Stadium	Jack Young
1 September	Odsal Stadium	Arthur Forrest

==== Scores ====
- Top 16 qualify for World final, 17th-18th reserves for World final

Pos.	Rider	Total pts
1	(Australia) Jack Young	29
2	(England) Peter Craven	28
3	(England) Eddie Rigg	28
4	(Sweden) Ove Fundin	26
5	(England) Brian Crutcher	26
6	(New Zealand) Ronnie Moore	26
7	(New Zealand) Geoff Mardon	26
8	(Australia) Aub Lawson	26
9	(England) Arthur Forrest	26
10	(Australia) Jack Biggs	24
11	(England) Fred Brand	24
12	(England) Split Waterman	23
13	(New Zealand) Barry Briggs	23
14	(England) Tommy Price	23
15	(Sweden) Olle Nygren	22
16	(New Zealand) Trevor Redmond	22
17	(England) Alan Hunt	22
18	(Wales) Freddie Williams	21
19	(England) Gerry Hussey	21
20	(Wales) Eric Williams	19
21	(New Zealand) Ron Johnston	18
22	(England) Arthur Wright	17
23	(Australia) Dick Campbell	17
24	(England) Dick Bradley	17
25	(Sweden) Rune Sörmander	16
26	(England) Cyril Roger	16
27	(England) Derick Close	16
28	(Sweden) Sune Karlsson	15
29	(England) Harry Edwards	15
30	(England) Bert Roger	15
31	(England) Tommy Miller	14
32	(England) Alan Smith	14

Pos.	Rider	Total pts
33	(England) Cyril Brine	14
34	(Guernsey) John Fitzpatrick	13
35	(Republic of Ireland) Don Perry	13
36	(England) Ken Sharples	13
37	(Scotland) Ken McKinlay	12
38	(Australia) Alan Quinn	12
39	(England) Fred Rogers	12
40	(Wales) Ian Williams	12
41	(England) Bob Roger	11
42	(England) Peter Robinson	11
43	(England) Ken Middleditch	11
44	(Australia) Jack Geran	10
45	(Sweden) Kjell Carlsson	9
46	(England) Ron Mountford	9
47	(England) Dent Oliver	9
48	(Sweden) Joel Jansson	8
49	(England) Eric Boothroyd	8
50	(England) Charlie May	8
51	(New Zealand) Brian McKeown	8
52	(England) Jim Lightfoot	9
53	(England) Pete Lansdale	8
54	(Sweden) Olle Segerström	7
55	(Austria) Fritz Dirtl	7
56	(England) Bob Oakley	7
57	(Australia) Junior Bainbridge	7
58	(England) Wally Green	6
59	(England) Phil Clarke	6
60	(England) Billy Bales	5
61	(England) Les McGillivray	4
62	(England) Jimmy Squibb	4
63	(Australia) Dick Seers	4
64	(Australia) Ernie Brecknell	2

== World final ==
- 16 September 1954
- (England) London, Wembley Stadium

Pos.	Rider	Heat Scores	Total
1	(New Zealand) Ronnie Moore	(3,3,3,3,3)	15
2	(England) Brian Crutcher	(3,2,2,3,3)	13+3
3	(Sweden) Olle Nygren	(2,3,3,3,2)	13+2
4	(Australia) Jack Young	(3,1,3,3,1)	11
5	(England) Split Waterman	(2,1,3,1,2)	9
6	(New Zealand) Barry Briggs	(1,2,2,2,2)	9
7	(England) Eddie Rigg	(0,3,2,2,0)	7
8	(England) Fred Brand	(3,1,0,2,1)	7
9	(Australia) Jack Biggs	(1,3,1,1,1)	7
10	(England) Arthur Forrest	(0,1,0,2,3)	5
11	(England) Tommy Price	(1,0,2,0,2)	5
12	(New Zealand) Geoff Mardon	(2,2,1,0,0)	5
13	(New Zealand) Trevor Redmond	(0,2,1,1,1)	5
14	(Australia) Aub Lawson	(2,0,0,2,0)	4
15	(England) Peter Craven	(F,0,0,0,3)	3
16	(Sweden) Ove Fundin	(1,0,1,0,F)	2
R1	(England) Alan Hunt	did not ride	–
R2	(Wales) Freddie Williams	did not ride	–

=== Classification ===
Placing	Rider	Total	1	2	3	4	5	6	7	8	9	10	11	12	13	14	15	16	17	18	19	20	Pts	Pos
1	(New Zealand) (14) Ronnie Moore	15				3		3					3		3							3	15	1
2	(England) (6) Brian Crutcher	13+3		3				2			2							3			3		13	2
3	(Sweden) (11) Olle Nygren	13+2			2				3		3					3						2	13	3
4	(Australia) (10) Jack Young	11			3			1						3			3		1				11	4
5	(England) (15) Split Waterman	9				2			1			3						1	2				9	5
6	(New Zealand) (7) Barry Briggs	9		1					2					2	2					2			9	6
7	(England) (5) Eddie Rigg	7		0			3					2					2					0	7	7
8	(England) (4) Fred Brand	7	3							1				0				2				1	7	8
9	(Australia) (16) Jack Biggs	7				1				3	1						1			1			7	9
10	(England) (1) Arthur Forrest	5	0				1				0				1				3				5	10
11	(England) (3) Tommy Price	5	1						0				2				0				2		5	11
12	(New Zealand) (8) Geoff Mardon	5		2						2			1			0			0				5	12
13	(New Zealand) (13) Trevor Redmond	5				0	2							1		1					1		5	13
14	(Australia) (2) Aub Lawson	4	2					0				0				2				0			4	14
15	(England) (9) Peter Craven	3			-		0						0					0		3			3	15
16	(Sweden) (12) Ove Fundin	2			1					0		1			0						-		2	16
	(England) (17) Alan Hunt	0																					0	
	(Wales) (18) Freddie Williams	0																					0	
Placing	Rider	Total	1	2	3	4	5	6	7	8	9	10	11	12	13	14	15	16	17	18	19	20	Pts	Pos

m - exclusion for exceeding two minute time allowance • t - exclusion for touching the tapes • x - other exclusion • e - retired or mechanical failure • f - fell • ns - non-starter • nc - non-classify

gate A - inside	gate B	gate C	gate D - outside
