= Austria national speedway team =

Austrian national motorcycle speedway team

Austria
- Association: Österreichischer Automobil-, Motorrad- und Touring Club
- FIM code: ÖAMTC
- Nation colour: Red, White and Red
- SWC Wins: 0

The Austria national speedway team are one of the teams that compete in international team motorcycle speedway.

== History ==
The Austrian speedway team competed in the inaugural Speedway World Team Cup in 1960, finishing third in the central European round.

With the exception of a three year spell from 1967 to 1969, Austria were ever present in the World Team Cup from 1960 to 2000. However, they were one of the weaker nations and struggled to qualify for the latter stages of the competition.

The team fared better in the World Pairs Championship, reaching finals in 1971 and 1975.

Since 2001, Austria have struggled further and have in the majority of cases failed to qualify for the World Cup or the Speedway of Nations (introduced in 2018). Their last significant appearance was in the final of the European Pairs Speedway Championship in 2016.

== Major world finals ==
=== World Pairs Championships ===
Year	Venue	Standings (Pts)	Riders	Pts
1971	(Poland); Rybnik; Rybnik Municipal Stadium	1. Poland (30); 2. New Zealand (25); 3. Sweden (22); 4. Czechoslovakia (17); 5. Scotland (16); 6. (Socialist Federal Republic of Yugoslavia) Yugoslavia (10); 7. Austria (6)	Josef Haider	4
1971	(Poland); Rybnik; Rybnik Municipal Stadium	1. Poland (30); 2. New Zealand (25); 3. Sweden (22); 4. Czechoslovakia (17); 5. Scotland (16); 6. (Socialist Federal Republic of Yugoslavia) Yugoslavia (10); 7. Austria (6)	Meinz Zimmerman	2
1975	(Poland); Wrocław; Stadion Olimpijski	1. Sweden (24); 2. Poland (23); 3. Denmark (20); 4. England (20); 5. Australia (19); 6. West Germany (10); 7. Austria (10)	Adi Funk	6
1975	(Poland); Wrocław; Stadion Olimpijski	1. Sweden (24); 2. Poland (23); 3. Denmark (20); 4. England (20); 5. Australia (19); 6. West Germany (10); 7. Austria (10)	Herbert Szerecs	4

== International caps (as of 2022) ==
Since the advent of the Speedway Grand Prix era, international caps earned by riders is largely restricted to international competitions, whereas previously test matches between two teams were a regular occurrence. This means that the number of caps earned by a rider has decreased in the modern era.

Rider	Caps
Bössner, Andreas	20
Bössner, Josef	
Dirtl, Fritz	
Fiala, Johannes	
Funk, Adi	25
Gappmaier, Dany	
Grubmuller, Walter	7
Haider, Josef	
Hauzinger, Manuel	2
Kamper, Josef	
Killmeyer, Leopold	3
Leitner, Franz	9
Novotny, Manuel	
Ozelt, Mario	
Pilotto, Toni	25
Schaaf, Alexander	
Szerecs, Herbert	
Simon, Lukas	
Sitzwohl, Alfred	2
Wallner, Fritz	
Zimmerman, Meinz	
Zorn, Franz	

== See also ==
- Speedway Grand Prix of Austria
- Austrian Individual Speedway Championship
