= 1956 Swedish speedway season =

Motorcycle racing competition

The 1956 Swedish speedway season was the 1956 season of motorcycle speedway in Sweden.

== Individual ==
=== Individual Championship ===
The 1956 Swedish Individual Speedway Championship final was held on 5 October in Gothenburg. Ove Fundin won the Swedish Championship.

| Pos. | Rider | Club | Total |
|---|---|---|---|
| 1 | Ove Fundin | Filbyterna | 14 |
| 2 | Lars Pettersson | Indianerna | 12 |
| 3 | Per-Olof Söderman | Filbyterna | 11+3 |
| 4 | Olle Nygren | Monarkerna | 11+2 |
| 5 | Stig Pramberg | Filbyterna | 10 |
| 6 | Per-Tage Svensson | Filbyterna | 10 |
| 7 | Rune Sörmander | Dackarna | 9 |
| 8 | Ulf Ericsson | Monarkerna | 9 |
| 9 | Birger Forsberg | Monarkerna | 8 |
| 10 | Olle Segerström | Kaparna | 8 |
| 11 | Olle Andersson II | Indianerna | 6 |
| 12 | Dan Forsberg | Filbyterna | 5 |
| 13 | Thorvald Karlsson | Dackarna | 3 |
| 14 | Thorsten Carlsson | Dackarna | 2 |
| 15 | Joel Jansson | Indianerna | 1 |
| 16 | Arne Carlsson (res) | Kaparna | 1 |
| 17 | Rune Claesson | Kaparna | 0 |
| 18 | Anders Olof Andersson (res) | Monarkerna | 0 |

== Team ==
=== Team Championship ===
Monarkerna won division 1 for the second consecutive season and were declared the winners of the Swedish Speedway Team Championship. The Monakerna team contained riders such as Olle Nygren and Ulf Ericsson.

As per the 1955 season there were just six teams that lined up for the 1956 season.

1956
| Pos | Team | Pts |
|---|---|---|
| 1 | Monarkerna | 16 |
| 2 | Dackarna | 15 |
| 3 | Filbyterna | 15 |
| 4 | Kaparna | 8 |
| 5 | Indianerna | 6 |
| 6 | Getingarna | 0 |

== See also ==
- Speedway in Sweden
