= 1952 Individual Speedway World Championship =

7th edition of the World motorcycle speedway championship

Seasons
- ← 1951 1953 →

The 1952 Individual Speedway World Championship was the seventh edition of the official World Championship to determine the world champion rider.

Australian rider Jack Young became the first rider to win a second title (and the first to win two in a row) when he won his second straight World Championship after scoring 14 points. Second was Welshman Freddie Williams on 13 points, with England's Bob Oakley third on 12 points.

== Qualification ==
Qualification started on 26 May.

=== Stage 1 ===
==== Swedish round ====
- 1952
- (Sweden) Ryd Motorstadion, Linköping
- First 8 to Nordic Final

| Pos. | Rider | Points |
|---|---|---|
| 1 | Rune Sörmander | 14+3 |
| 2 | Sune Karlsson | 14+2 |
| 3 | Bert Lindarw | 10 |
| 4 | Helge Brinkeback | 9 |
| 5 | Göte Olsson | 9 |
| 6 | Stig Pramberg | 9 |
| 7 | Evert Fransson | 8 |
| 8 | Olle Nygren | 8 |
| 9 | Bo Andersson | 8 |
| 10 | Einar Lindqvist | 7 |
| 11 | Linus Eriksson | 6 |
| 12 | Lars-Erik Österberg | 5 |
| 13 | Lars Thaung | 4 |
| 14 | Eskil Carlsson | 3 |
| 15 | Lennart Carlström | 2 |
| 16 | Kjell Carlsson | 2 |
| 17 | Joel Jansson | 1 |

=== Stage 2 ===
==== Continental qualifier ====
- 15 June 1952
- (West Germany) BBM Stadium, Munich
- First 4 to Continental round

| Pos. | Rider | Points |
|---|---|---|
| 1 | (Austria) Fritz Dirtl | 15 |
| 2 | (Austria) Josef Kamper | 14 |
| 3 | (Sweden) Sven Skoglund | 11 |
| 4 | (Netherlands) Tinus Metzelaar | 11 |
| 5 | (Austria) Leopold Killemeyer | 11 |
| 6 | (West Germany) Albin Siegl | 9 |
| 7 | (Sweden) Åke Lindqvist | 8 |
| 8 | (Scotland) Bob Mark | 7 |
| 9 | (Netherlands) Thei Bischops | 7 |
| 10 | (Austria) Karl Killmeyer | 6 |
| 11 | (West Germany) Josef Hofmeister | 6 |
| 12 | (Netherlands) Gerrit Jonker | 5 |
| 13 | (West Germany) Alfred Aberl | 5 |
| 14 | (West Germany) Franz Neubauer | 1 |
| 15 | (England) Reg Morgan | 0 |
| 16 | (Austria) Walter Dirtl | 0 |

==== Nordic Final ====
- 20 June 1952
- (Sweden) Växjö Motorstadion, Växjö
- First 8 to Continental Final

| Pos. | Rider | Points |
|---|---|---|
| 1 | (Norway) Basse Hveem | 14 |
| 2 | (Sweden) Bo Andersson | 13 |
| 3 | (Sweden) Rune Sörmander | 12 |
| 4 | (Sweden) Olle Nygren | 12 |
| 5 | (Sweden) Sune Karlsson | 10 |
| 6 | (Sweden) Stig Pramberg | 9 |
| 7 | (Sweden) Göte Olsson | 9 |
| 8 | (Denmark) Kiehn Berthelsen | 8 |
| 9 | (Norway) Werner Lorentzen | 7 |
| 10 | (Sweden) Evert Fransson | 6 |
| 11 | (Norway) Reidar Kristoffersen | 6 |
| 12 | (Sweden) Bert Lindarw | 5 |
| 13 | (Norway) Rolf Naess | 5 |
| 14 | (Finland) Leo Helminen | 2 |
| 15 | (Finland) Yrjö Heikkilä | 2 |
| 16 | (Denmark) Morian Hansen | 0 |
| 17 | (Sweden) Helge Brinkeback | dnr |

=== Stage 3 ===
==== Continental Final ====
- 22 June 1952
- (Sweden) Falköping Motorbanan, Falköping
- First 8 to International Round

| Pos. | Rider | Points |
|---|---|---|
| 1 | (Sweden) Rune Sörmander | 14 |
| 2 | (Sweden) Olle Nygren | 12 |
| 3 | (Sweden) Stig Pramberg | 11 |
| 4 | (England) Jim Gregory | 11 |
| 5 | (Norway) Basse Hveem | 11 |
| 6 | (Sweden) Bo Andersson | 11 |
| 7 | (Sweden) Sune Karlsson | 9 |
| 8 | (Austria) Fritz Dirtl | 7 |
| 9 | (Austria) Josef Kamper | 7 |
| 10 | (Australia) Ron Phillips | 6 |
| 11 | (Sweden) Göte Olsson | 6 |
| 12 | (Scotland) Ken McKinlay | 5 |
| 13 | (Sweden) Sven Skoglund | 5 |
| 14 | (Norway) Edvin Fredriksen | 2 |
| 15 | (England) Tony Lewis | 2 |
| 16 | (Denmark) Kiehn Berthelsen | 0 |
| 17 | (Netherlands) Tinus Metzelaar | dnr |

==== British national round ====
- Top riders qualify for the International round

| Date | Venue | Winner |
|---|---|---|
| 26 May | County Ground Stadium | Goog Hoskin |
| 29 May | Penarth Road Stadium | Gerald Pugh |
| 29 May | Foxhall Stadium | Noel Watson |
| 30 May | Monmore Green Stadium | Benny King |
| 31 May | Aldershot Stadium | Jock Grierson |
| 31 May | Abbey Stadium | Harry Bastable |

=== Stage 4 ===
==== International round ====
- The top 62 riders qualify for the Championship round.

| Date | Venue | Winner |
|---|---|---|
| 7 July | Wimborne Road | Ken Middleditch |
| 8 July | Yarmouth Stadium | Cyril Roger |
| 9 July | White City Stadium, Glasgow | Tommy Miller |
| 10 July | Oxford Stadium | Harry Saunders |
| 11 July | The Stadium, Motherwell | Tommy Miller |
| 14 July | Stanley Stadium | Peter Robinson |
| 19 July | Ashfield Stadium | Ron Johnston |
| 19 July | Brandon Stadium | Vic Emms |
| 19 July | Old Meadowbank | Ron Mountford |
| 19 July | Sun Street Stadium | Ken Adams |
| 25 July | Dudley Wood Stadium | Les Tolley |
| 25 July | Leicester Stadium | Arthur Payne |

=== Stage 5 ===
==== Championship Round ====
- Top 16 qualify for World final, 17th & 18th reserves for World final

| Date | Venue | Winner |
|---|---|---|
| 11 August | Wimbledon Stadium | Ronnie Moore |
| 12 August | West Ham Stadium | Jack Young |
| 14 August | Wembley Stadium | Jeff Lloyd |
| 16 August | Hyde Road Stadium | Ron How |
| 16 August | Odsal Stadium | Arthur Forrest |
| 23 August | Perry Barr Stadium | Arthur Payne |
| 23 August | The Firs Stadium | Bob Oakley |
| 27 August | New Cross Stadium | Split Waterman |
| 29 August | Knowle Stadium | Dick Bradley |
| 29 August | Harringay Stadium | Jack Biggs |

==== Scores ====
- Top 16 qualify for World final, 17th & 18th reserves for World final

| Pos. | Rider | Total pts |
|---|---|---|
| 1 | (England) Bob Oakley | 28 |
| 2 | (Australia) Jack Young | 27 |
| 3 | (England) Split Waterman | 27 |
| 4 | (New Zealand) Ronnie Moore | 27 |
| 5 | (Wales) Freddie Williams | 27 |
| 6 | (England) Ron How | 26 |
| 7 | (England) Dick Bradley | 25 |
| 8 | (England) Cyril Roger | 25 |
| 9 | (England) Arthur Forrest | 24 |
| 10 | (England) Jeff Lloyd | 24 |
| 11 | (England) Brian Crutcher | 24 |
| 12 | (Australia) Arthur Payne | 24 |
| 13 | (South Africa) Henry Long | 23 |
| 14 | (England) Derick Close | 23 |
| 15 | (England) Bert Roger | 23 |
| 16 | (Australia) Graham Warren | 22 |
| 17 | (Sweden) Dan Forsberg | 22 |
| 18 | (Norway) Basse Hveem | 22 |
| 19 | (New Zealand) Trevor Redmond | 22 |
| 20 | (England) Alan Hunt | 22 |
| 21 | (Sweden) Olle Nygren | 21 |
| 22 | (England) Cyril Brine | 21 |
| 23 | (England) Ken Sharples | 21 |
| 24 | (England) Tommy Price | 21 |
| 25 | (New Zealand) Geoff Mardon | 21 |
| 26 | (England) Eddie Rigg | 20 |
| 27 | (England) Peter Robinson | 18 |
| 28 | (England) Don Cuppleditch | 18 |
| 29 | (England) Harry Bastable | 18 |
| 30 | (England) Chris Boss | 17 |
| 31 | (England) Harry Edwards | 16 |
| 32 | (Australia) Jack Biggs | 16 |
| 33 | (Sweden) Sune Karlsson | 16 |
| 34 | (England) Eric French | 16 |
| 35 | (Scotland) Willie Wilson | 15 |
| 36 | (Wales) Eric Williams | 15 |
| 37 | (England) Wally Green | 14 |
| 38 | (England) Pat Clarke | 14 |
| 39 | (England) George Wilks | 14 |
| 40 | (Scotland) Gordon McGregor | 13 |

| Pos. | Rider | Total pts |
|---|---|---|
| 41 | (New Zealand) Dick Campbell | 13 |
| 42 | (England) Vic Emms | 13 |
| 43 | (England) Les Tolley | 13 |
| 44 | (England) Ken Adams | 13 |
| 45 | (England) Ron Mountford | 13 |
| 46 | (England) Ken Middleditch | 13 |
| 47 | (England) Geoff Pymar | 13 |
| 48 | (Sweden) Rune Sörmander | 12 |
| 49 | (England) Sid Clark | 12 |
| 50 | (England) Len Williams | 11 |
| 51 | (England) Jack Parker | 10 |
| 52 | (New Zealand) Les Hewitt | 10 |
| 53 | (England) Nobby Stock | 10 |
| 54 | (England) Ivor Powell | 10 |
| 55 | (England) Billy Hole | 10 |
| 56 | (Scotland) Tommy Miller | 10 |
| 57 | (England) Terry Small | 10 |
| 58 | (New Zealand) Charlie New | 9 |
| 59 | (New Zealand) Harold Fairhurst | 9 |
| 60 | (England) Phil Malpass | 9 |
| 61 | (Scotland) Jock Grierson | 9 |
| 62 | (Australia) Lionel Benson | 8 |
| 63 | (England) Gerald Jackson | 8 |
| 64 | (Sweden) Stig Pramberg | 8 |
| 65 | (Wales) Tom Oakley | 7 |
| 66 | (England) Fred Brand | 7 |
| 67 | (Scotland) Larry Lazarus | 7 |
| 68 | (England) Louis Lawson | 7 |
| 69 | (England) Reg Duval | 6 |
| 70 | (England) Jim Gregory | 6 |
| 71 | (England) Fred Pawson | 6 |
| 72 | (England) Bruce Semmens | 5 |
| 73 | (England) Bill Gilbert | 5 |
| 74 | (England) Roy Craighead | 5 |
| 75 | (England) Harry Saunders | 4 |
| 76 | (England) George Wall | 4 |
| 77 | (England) Bob Baker | 3 |
| 78 | (Austria) Fritz Dirtl | 2 |
| 79 | (England) Harry Welch | 1 |

== World final ==
Nr. 3 Bob Oakley winning a race in the Netherlands in 1949

- 18 September 1952
- (England) Wembley Stadium, London

| Pos. | Rider | Points | Heats |
|---|---|---|---|
| 1 | (Australia) Jack Young | 14 | (3,3,3,3,2) |
| 2 | (Wales) Freddie Williams | 13 | (3,2,3,2,3) |
| 3 | (England) Bob Oakley | 12 | (3,3,2,1,3) |
| 4 | (New Zealand) Ronnie Moore | 10 | (2,2,3,F,3) |
| 5 | (Australia) Arthur Payne | 9 | (0,1,2,3,3) |
| 6 | (Sweden) Dan Forsberg | 9 | (2,3,1,3,F) |
| 7 | (England) Dick Bradley | 9 | (3,2,3,1,0) |
| 8 | (England) Jeff Lloyd | 7 | (2,2,0,2,1) |
| 9 | (England) Arthur Forrest | 7 | (1,1,0,3,2) |
| 10 | (South Africa) Henry Long | 7 | (1,0,2,2,2) |
| 11 | (England) Brian Crutcher | 6 | (1,3,1,0,1) |
| 12 | (England) Split Waterman | 6 | (2,1,0,1,2) |
| 13 | (Australia) Graham Warren | 5 | (0,1,1,2,1) |
| 14 | (England) Derick Close | 4 | (1,0,2,0,1) |
| 15 | (England) Cyril Roger | 2 | (0,Ex,1,1,0) |
| 16 | (England) Ron How | 0 | (0,d,0,0,0) |
| | (Norway) Basse Hveem (res) | – | – |
| | (New Zealand) Trevor Redmond (res) | – | – |

=== Classification ===
| Placing | Rider | Total | 1 | 2 | 3 | 4 | 5 | 6 | 7 | 8 | 9 | 10 | 11 | 12 | 13 | 14 | 15 | 16 | 17 | 18 | 19 | 20 | Pts | Pos |
|---|---|---|---|---|---|---|---|---|---|---|---|---|---|---|---|---|---|---|---|---|---|---|---|---|
| 1 | (Australia) (10) Jack Young | 14 | | | 3 | | | 3 | | | | | | 3 | | | 3 | | 2 | | | | 14 | 1 |
| 2 | (Wales) (2) Freddie Williams | 13 | 3 | | | | | 2 | | | | 3 | | | | 2 | | | | 3 | | | 13 | 2 |
| 3 | (England) (8) Bob Oakley | 12 | | 3 | | | | | | 3 | | | 2 | | | 1 | | | 3 | | | | 12 | 3 |
| 4 | (New Zealand) (3) Ronnie Moore | 10 | 2 | | | | | | 2 | | | | 3 | | | | - | | | | 3 | | 4 | 4 |
| 5 | (Australia) (4) Arthur Payne | 9 | 0 | | | | | | | 1 | | | | 2 | | | | 3 | | | | 3 | 9 | 5 |
| 6 | (Sweden) (11) Dan Forsberg | 9 | | | 2 | | | | 3 | | 1 | | | | | 3 | | | | | | - | 9 | 6 |
| 7 | (England) (16) Dick Bradley | 9 | | | | 3 | | | | 2 | 3 | | | | | | 1 | | | 0 | | | 9 | 7 |
| 8 | (England) (5) Jeff Lloyd | 7 | | 2 | | | 2 | | | | | 0 | | | | | 2 | | | | | 1 | 7 | 8 |
| 9 | (England) (7) Arthur Forrest | 7 | | 1 | | | | | 1 | | | | | 0 | 3 | | | | | 2 | | | 7 | 9 |
| 10 | (South Africa) (12) Henry Long | 7 | | | 1 | | | | | 0 | | 2 | | | 2 | | | | | | 2 | | 7 | 10 |
| 11 | (England) (13) Brian Crutcher | 6 | | | | 1 | 3 | | | | | | | 1 | | 0 | | | | | 1 | | 6 | 11 |
| 12 | (England) (14) Split Waterman | 6 | | | | 2 | | 1 | | | | | 0 | | 1 | | | | | | | 2 | 6 | 12 |
| 13 | (Australia) (9) Graham Warren | 5 | | | 0 | | 1 | | | | | | 1 | | | | | 2 | | 1 | | | 5 | 13 |
| 14 | (England) (1) Derek Close | 4 | 1 | | | | 0 | | | | 2 | | | | 0 | | | | 1 | | | | 4 | 14 |
| 15 | (England) (15) Cyril Roger | 2 | | | | 0 | | | - | | | 1 | | | | | | 1 | 0 | | | | 0 | 15 |
| 16 | (England) (6) Ron How | 0 | | 0 | | | | - | | | 0 | | | | | | | 0 | | | 0 | | 0 | 16 |
| | (Norway) (17) Basse Hveem (res) | 0 | | | | | | | | | | | | | | | | | | | | | 0 | |
| | (New Zealand) (18) Trevor Redmond (res) | 0 | | | | | | | | | | | | | | | | | | | | | 0 | |
| Placing | Rider | Total | 1 | 2 | 3 | 4 | 5 | 6 | 7 | 8 | 9 | 10 | 11 | 12 | 13 | 14 | 15 | 16 | 17 | 18 | 19 | 20 | Pts | Pos |

m - exclusion for exceeding two minute time allowance • t - exclusion for touching the tapes • x - other exclusion • e - retired or mechanical failure • f - fell • ns - non-starter • nc - non-classify

| gate A - inside | gate B | gate C | gate D - outside |

=== Podium ===
1. (gold) Jack Young (Australia)
2. (silver) Freddie Williams (Wales)
3. (bronze) Bob Oakley (England)
