= 1956 Individual Speedway World Championship =

11th edition of the World motorcycle speedway championship

Seasons
- ← 1955 1957 →

The 1956 Individual Speedway World Championship was the 11th edition of the official World Championship to determine the world champion rider.

The World final was sponsored by the Sunday Dispatch and was televised live. Despite being televised a crowd of 65,000 saw the first Scandinavian winner in 23 year old Ove Fundin from Sweden.

== Qualification ==
Qualification started in 1955.

=== Stage 1 ===
==== Norwegian qualification ====
The October 1955 Norwegian final was cancelled due to bad weather, resulting in riders being seeded to Nordic round

==== Finnish round ====
- 23 October 1955
- (Finland) Helsinki Velodrome, Helsinki
- First 7 (+seeded riders) to 1956 Nordic round

Pos.	Rider	Points
1	Kauko Jousanen	15
2	Antti Pajari	14
3	Simo Ylänen	11
4	Janne Rihkajrvi	11
5	Aulis Tuominen	10
6	Pertti Mikkola	9
7	Erkki Ala Sippola	9
8	Paavo Mikkola	7
9	Pekka Tenko	7
10	Raimo Kivinen	6
11	Toimi Koskela	4
12	Nils Staaf	4
13	Reino Niemi	4
14	Pentti Paajanen	3
15	Kalevi Lahtinen	3
16	Antti Mattila	2

==== Swedish round ====
- 27 April 1956
- (Sweden) Hammarby IP, Stockholm
- Top 6 to Nordic round

Pos.	Rider	Points
1	Dan Forsberg	14
2	Ulf Ericsson	13
3	Bernt Nilsson	13
4	Birger Forsberg	11
5	Lars Pettersson	11
6	Per-Tage Svensson	9
7	Sune Karlsson	8
8	Sven Fahlén	8
9	Bert Lindarw	7
10	Olle Segerström	6
11	Rune Claesson	6
12	Bengt Eriksson	6
13	Göte Nordin	5
14	Alf Jonsson	2
15	Thorsten Carlsson	2
16	Thorvald Karlsson	0

- 29 April 1956
- (Sweden) Målilla Motorbana, Målilla
- Top 6 to Nordic round

Pos.	Rider	Points
1	Rune Sörmander	15
2	Olle Andersson II	13
3	Göran Norlén	11
4	Stig Pramberg	11
5	Allan Nilsson	10
6	Per-Olof Söderman	10
7	Olle Heyman	9
8	Bertil Carlsson II	8
9	Kaj Forsberg	7
10	Joel Jansson	6
11	Roger Forsberg	6
12	Evert Andersson	5
13	Olle Andersson I	5
14	Bengt Gustafsson	2
15	Per Sjöholm	1
16	Åke Andersson	1
17	Bo Sandin	0

=== Stage 2 ===
==== Nordic round ====
- 25 May 1956
- (Norway) Dælenenga idrettspark, Oslo
- Top 8 to Nordic final

Pos.	Rider	Points
1	Henry Andersen	14
2	Göran Norlén	11
3	Rune Sörmander	11
4	Reidar Kristoffersen	11
5	Olle Andersson II	11
6	Per-Olof Söderman	10
7	Stig Pramberg	10
8	Aage Hansen	9
9	Antti Pajari	9
10	Jörgen Stabirk	5
11	Werner Lorentzen	5
12	Roger Steen	4
13	Torbjörn Ludvigsen	4
14	Erling Cae	2
15	Odd Johansen	2
16	Erhard Fisker	2

- 27 May 1956
- (Finland) Helsinki Velodrome, Helsinki
- Top 8 to Nordic final

Pos.	Rider	Points
1	Bernt Nilsson	13
2	Ulf Ericsson	13
3	Birger Forsberg	12
4	Lars Pettersson	11
5	Rolf Westerberg	11
6	Dan Forsberg	10
7	Kaukko Jousanen	9
8	Simo Ylänen	9
9	Per-Tage Svensson	8
10	Aulis Tuominen	8
11	Erkki Ala-Sippola	4
12	Juha Rihkajärvi	4
13	Esko Koponen	3
14	Tore Mellby	2
15	Kalevi Lathinen	2
16	Pertti Mikkola	0

==== Continental round ====
- 29 April 1956
- (Poland) Army Stadium, Warsaw
- Top 8 to Continental final

Pos.	Rider	Points
1	Florian Kapala	13
2	Edward Kupczynski	12
3	Janusz Suchecki	11
4	Edmund Nazimek	11
5	Marian Kaiser	11
6	Hugo Rosak	10
7	Tadeusz Teodorowicz	10
8	Mieczyslaw Polukard	10
9	Wlodzimierz Szwendrowski	10
10	Josef Kysilka	5
11	Richard Janicek	4
12	Rudolf Havelka	4
13	Miloslav Špinka	4
14	Karel Polak	4
15	Jaroslav Machac	1
16	Alois Jarolim	0

- 1 May 1956
- (West Germany) Altes Stadion Abensberg, Abensberg
- Top 8 to Continental final

Pos.	Rider	Points
1	Josef Hofmeister	15
2	Josef Siedl	14
3	Andrzej Krzesiński	13
4	Albin Siegl	
5	Paul Cardang	
6	Sebastian Wiesent	
7	Alfred Aberl	
8	Fritz Dirtl	
9	Josef Kamper	

=== Stage 3 ===
==== British & Commonwealth round ====
- Top 21 qualify for Championship round.

Date	Venue	Winner
10 July	Banister Court Stadium	Ian Williams
12 July	Foxhall Stadium	Ken McKinlay
12 July	Oxford Stadium	Howdy Byford
13 July	Leicester Stadium	Dick Bradley
14 July	Rayleigh Weir Stadium	Gerald Jackson
25 July	Brandon Stadium	Bert Edwards
25 July	Abbey Stadium	Bob Roger

==== Nordic Final ====
- 8 June 1956
- (Sweden) Ryd Motorstadion, Linköping
- First 7 to European final

Pos.	Rider	Points
1	(Sweden) Dan Forsberg	15
2	(Sweden) Ulf Ericsson	14
3	(Sweden) Rune Sörmander	13
4	(Sweden) Bernt Nilsson	12
5	(Sweden) Göran Norlén	11
6	(Sweden) Per Olof Söderman	9
7	(Sweden) Birger Forsberg	9
8	(Sweden) Ole Andersson	7
9	(Sweden) Per Tage Svensson	6
10	(Norway) Aage Hansen	5
11	(Norway) Rolf Westerberg	5
12	(Sweden) Stig Pramberg	3
13	(Sweden) Lars Pettersson	1
14	(Finland) Antti Pajari	1
15	(Finland) Simo Ylänen	0
16	(Norway) Reidar Kristoffersen	dnr
17	(Finland) Kaukko Jousanen	dnr

==== Continental Final ====
Fritz Dirtl was tragically killed competing in the Continental final. He was involved in a crash with fellow Austrian rider Josef Kamper and the fell into the path of Mieczysław Połukard.

- 10 June 1956
- (West Germany) Niederrheinstadion, Oberhausen
- First 7 to European Final

Pos.	Rider	Points
1	(Sweden) Kjell Carlsson	14
2	(West Germany) Josef Seidl	14
3	(Poland) Andrzej Krzesiński	11
4	(Poland) Włodzimierz Szwendrowski	10
5	(Poland) Tadeusz Teodorowicz	10
6	(Poland) Edward Kupczyński	9
7	(Poland) Florian Kapała	9
8	(Poland) Mieczysław Połukard	9
9	(West Germany) Albin Siegl	7
10	(Czechoslovakia) Hugo Rosák	7
11	(West Germany) Josef Hofmeister	5
12	(Netherlands) Paul Cardang	5
13	(West Germany) Sebastian Wiesent	5
14	(West Germany) Alfred Aberl	2
15	(Austria) Fritz Dirtl	0
16	(Austria) Josef Kamper	0
17	(Poland) Janusz Suchecki	dnr
18	(Poland) Edmund Nazimek	dnr
19	(Poland) Marian Kaiser	dnr

=== Stage 4 ===
==== Championship Round ====
- Top 11 qualify, 1 reserve for World final

Date	Venue	Winner
20 August	Wimbledon Stadium	Ronnie Moore
22 August	Wimborne Road	Jack Biggs
23 August	Wembley Stadium	Brian Crutcher
25 August	Hyde Road Stadium	Brian Crutcher
29 August	Odsal Stadium	Barry Briggs
31 August	Perry Barr Stadium	Alan Hunt / Doug Davies
1 September	The Firs Stadium	Gerry Hussey

- (Peter Craven seeded to World final)

Scores
First 11 to World final + 1 reserve

Pos.	Rider	Total pts
1	(England) Brian Crutcher	29
2	(New Zealand) Ronnie Moore	27
3	(England) Gerry Hussey	26
4	(England) Alan Hunt	26
5	(Scotland) Ken McKinlay	26
6	(South Africa) Doug Davies	25
7	(New Zealand) Barry Briggs	25
8	(England) Arthur Forrest	25
9	(England) Dick Fisher	24
10	(England) Eric Boothroyd	24
11	(England) Peter Moore	23
12	(Australia) Jack Biggs	23
13	(England) Nigel Boocock	23
14	(Australia) Aub Lawson	22
15	(England) Split Waterman	22
16	(England) Ron How	20
17	(New Zealand) Ron Johnston	18
18	(England) Les McGillivray	17
19	(England) Bob Roger	17
20	(England) Billy Bales	17
21	(New Zealand) Bob Duckworth	17
22	(England) Guy Allott	17
23	(England) Gerald Jackson	16
24	(England) Eric French	14
25	(England) Peter Williams	14
26	(England) Ron Clarke	14
27	(England) Bert Edwards	13
28	(England) Ken Middleditch	13
29	(England) Harry Bastable	13

Pos.	Rider	Total pts
30	(England) Cyril Roger	12
31	(England) Bert Roger	12
32	(Australia) Ray Cresp	12
33	(England) Ken Sharples	12
34	(England) Phil Clarke	11
35	(England) Cyril Maidment	10
36	(England) Jim Tolley	10
37	(England) Dick Bradley	9
38	(England) Alby Golden	9
39	(England) Arthur Wright	9
40	(England) George White	8
41	(England) Howdy Byford	8
42	(England) Ronnie Genz	8
43	(Australia) Bob Sharp	8
44	(New Zealand) Trevor Redmond	7
45	(England) Reg Trott	6
46	(England) Pete Lansdale	6
47	(Australia) Jack Geran	5
48	(Australia) Junior Bainbridge	5
49	(England) Bill Holden	4
50	(England) Ron Mountford	4
51	(England) Allan Kidd	4
52	(England) Cyril Brine	4
53	(England) Barry East	3
54	(England) Neil Mortimer	2
55	(Scotland) Gordon McGregor	2
56	(England) Alf Hagon	2
57	(England) Derek Tailby	2
58	(New Zealand) Bill Andrew	1

==== European Final ====
- 8 July 1956
- (Norway) Bislett Stadium, Oslo
- First 4 to World final plus 1 reserve

Pos.	Rider	Total
1	(Sweden) Ove Fundin	15
2	(Sweden) Per Olof Söderman	13
3	(Sweden) Ole Andersson	12
4	(Sweden) Ulf Ericsson	11
5	(Sweden) Rune Sörmander	10
6	(Norway) Henry Andersen	8
7	(Poland) Florian Kapała	8
8	(Poland) Edward Kupczyński	7
9	(Sweden) Göran Norlén	7
10	(Sweden) Dan Forsberg	6
11	(Sweden) Birger Forsberg	5
12	(Sweden) Bernt Nilsson	4
13	(Poland) Włodzimierz Szwendrowski	2
14	(Poland) Mieczysław Połukard	2
15	(Poland) Marian Kaiser	2
16	(Poland) Tadeusz Teodorowicz	2

== World final ==
- 22 September 1956
- (England) Wembley Stadium, London

Pos.	Rider	Heat Scores	Total
1	(Sweden) Ove Fundin	(1,3,3,3,3)	13
2	(New Zealand) Ronnie Moore	(2,2,2,3,3)	12
3	(England) Arthur Forrest	(3,1,3,2,2)	11+3
4	(England) Peter Craven	(3,1,2,2,3)	11+2
5	(Scotland) Ken McKinlay	(2,2,3,3,0)	10
6	(Sweden) Per Olof Söderman	(0,3,2,2,3)	10
7	(New Zealand) Barry Briggs	(3,2,1,3,1)	10
8	(England) Brian Crutcher	(1,3,3,0,2)	9
9	(Australia) Peter Moore	(2,1,1,2,2)	8
10	(England) Eric Boothroyd	(2,3,1,1,0)	7
11	(England) Alan Hunt	(3,0,1,1,1)	6
12	(England) Dick Fisher	(0,0,2,1,2)	5
13	(South Africa) Doug Davies	(1,2,0,0,1)	4
14	(Sweden) Ole Andersson	(1,1,0,0,0)	2
15	(Sweden) Ulf Ericsson	(0,0,0,1,1)	2
16	(England) Gerry Hussey	(0,0,0,0,0)	0
R1	(Sweden) Rune Sörmander	absent	-
R2	(Australia) Jack Biggs	did not ride	-
R3	(England) Nigel Boocock	did not ride	-

=== Classification ===
Placing	Rider	Total	1	2	3	4	5	6	7	8	9	10	11	12	13	14	15	16	17	18	19	20	Pts	Pos
1	(Sweden) (4) Ove Fundin	13	1							3				3				3				3	13	1
2	(New Zealand) (3) Ronnie Moore	12	2						2				2				3				3		12	2
3	(England) (5) Arthur Forrest	11+3		3			1					3					2					2	11	3
4	(England) (2) Peter Craven	11+2	3					1				2				2				3			11	4
5	(Scotland) (8) Ken McKinlay	10		2						2			3			3			0				10	5
6	(Sweden) (1) Per Olof Söderman	10	0				3				2				2				3				10	6
7	(New Zealand) (14) Barry Briggs	10				3		2					1		3							1	10	7
8	(England) (6) Brian Crutcher	9		1				3			3							0			2		9	8
9	(Australia) (15) Peter Moore	8				2			1			1						2	2				8	9
10	(England) (11) Eric Boothroyd	7			2				3		1					1						0	7	10
11	(England) (10) Alan Hunt	6			3			0						1			1		1				6	11
12	(England) (7) Dick Fisher	5		0					0					2	1					2			5	12
13	(South Africa) (13) Doug Davies	4				1	2							0		0					1		4	13
14	(Sweden) (12) Ole Andersson	2			1					1		0			0						0		2	14
15	(Sweden) (9) Ulf Ericsson	2			0		0						0					1		1			2	15
16	(England) (16) Gerry Hussey	0				0				0	0						0			0			0	16
	(Australia) (17) Jack Biggs	0																					0	
	(England) (18) Nigel Boocock	0																					0	
Placing	Rider	Total	1	2	3	4	5	6	7	8	9	10	11	12	13	14	15	16	17	18	19	20	Pts	Pos

m - exclusion for exceeding two minute time allowance • t - exclusion for touching the tapes • x - other exclusion • e - retired or mechanical failure • f - fell • ns - non-starter • nc - non-classify

gate A - inside	gate B	gate C	gate D - outside
