= 2017 Speedway Grand Prix Qualification =

The 2017 Individual Speedway World Championship Grand Prix Qualification was a series of motorcycle speedway meetings that were used to determine the three riders that qualified for the 2017 Speedway Grand Prix. The series consisted of four qualifying rounds at Terenzano, Slangerup, King's Lynn and Abensberg, two semi-finals at Goričan and Lonigo and then the Grand Prix Challenge at Vetlanda. The three riders that qualified were Patryk Dudek, Martin Vaculík and Fredrik Lindgren.

== Qualifying rounds ==
=== Round One ===
- 7 May 2016
- (Denmark) Slangerup

Pos.	Rider	Points	Details
1	(Poland) Bartosz Zmarzlik	12	(3,1,3,2,3)
2	(Denmark) Mikkel Bech Jensen	11+3	(2,3,1,3,2)
3	(Finland) Timo Lahti	11+2	(1,3,1,3,3)
4	(Ukraine) Andrey Karpov	11+1	(3,3,3,0,2)
5	(Slovakia) Martin Vaculík	10	(3,R,2,2,3)
6	(Sweden) Thomas H. Jonasson	10	(2,3,2,2,1)
7	(Latvia) Andžejs Ļebedevs	9	(2,2,2,1,2)
8	(Denmark) Anders Thomsen	8+3	(0,2,X,3,3)
9	(Sweden) Linus Sundström	8+2	(3,1,1,1,2)
10	(Russia) Vadim Tarasenko	8+1	(1,0,3,3,1)
11	(United Kingdom) Chris Harris	7	(2,2,2,0,1)
12	(Australia) Nick Morris	5	(0,2,0,2,1)
13	(Czech Republic) Eduard Krčmář	4	(0,1,3,R,0)
14	(Norway) Glenn Moi	3	(1,1,R,1,0)
15	(Australia) Rohan Tungate	2	(1,0,1,0,0)
16	(Latvia) Oļegs Mihailovs	1	(0,R,0,1,0)
	(Denmark) Leon Madsen	DNS	
	(Denmark) Mikkel Michelsen	DNS	

=== Round Three ===
- 7 May 2016
- (United Kingdom) King's Lynn

Pos.	Rider	Points	Details
1	(Sweden) Fredrik Lindgren	13	(3,3,3,2,2)
2	(Poland) Krzysztof Kasprzak	12+3	(3,F,3,3,3)
3	(Denmark) Kenneth Bjerre	12+2	(1,3,3,2,3)
4	(Denmark) Hans N. Andersen	11	(2,3,2,3,1)
5	(Finland) Joonas Kylmäkorpi	10	(3,2,2,3,T)
6	(Australia) Sam Masters	10	(2,1,3,3,1)
7	(Australia) Brady Kurtz	9	(1,2,1,2,3)
8	(United Kingdom) Craig Cook	8+3	(3,3,0,F,2)
9	(United Kingdom) Robert Lambert	8+2	(2,2,0,1,3)
10	(United States) Ricky Wells	7	(1,2,2,1,1)
11	(Czech Republic) Matěj Kůs	5	(2,1,1,2,F)
12	(United Kingdom) Jason Garrity	5	(1,0,2,0,2)
13	(New Zealand) Bradley Wilson-Dean	3	(F,1,1,1,0)
14	(United Kingdom) Lewis Kerr	2	(-,-,-,-,2)
15	(Norway) Lasse Fredriksen	2	(F,0,1,1,0)
16	(France) Alexandre Dubrana	2	(0,1,0,0,1)
17	(France) Gabriel Dubernard	0	(0,F,0,0,0)
	(United Kingdom) Lewis Bridger	DNS	

=== Round Two ===
- 7 May 2016
- (Italy) Terenzano

Pos.	Rider	Points	Details
1	(Poland) Piotr Pawlicki Jr.	14	(3,3,3,3,2)
2	(Sweden) Kim Nilsson	13	(3,1,3,3,3)
3	(Denmark) Michael Jepsen Jensen	12	(2,2,3,2,3)
4	(Sweden) Peter Ljung	10	(3,2,1,3,1)
5	(Poland) Krzysztof Buczkowski	10	(3,3,1,1,2)
6	(Italy) Nicolás Covatti	10	(2,1,2,3,2)
7	(Germany) Kai Huckenbeck	9+3	(1,3,2,F,3)
8	(Croatia) Jurica Pavlic	9+2	(0,3,1,2,3)
9	(Italy) Michele Paco Castagna	7	(2,2,0,2,1)
10	(Ukraine) Stanislaw Mielniczuk	6	(2,0,3,0,1)
11	(Germany) René Deddens	5	(1,F,0,2,2)
12	(Hungary) Norbert Magosi	5	(1,1,2,1,0)
13	(Slovenia) Nick Škorja	5	(0,1,2,1,1)
14	(Slovenia) Matic Ivačič	4	(1,2,1,0,0)
15	(Argentina) Jonathan Iturre	1	(F,0,R,1,R)
16	(Italy) Alessandro Milanese	0	(0,0,0,0,0)
	(Italy) Giorgio Trentin	DNS	

=== Round Four ===
- 16 May 2016
- (Germany) Abensberg

Pos.	Rider	Points	Details
1	(Australia) Max Fricke	9	(3,3,3)
2	(Germany) Martin Smolinski	9	(3,3,3)
3	(Poland) Tomasz Jędrzejak	8	(3,3,2)
4	(Poland) Patryk Dudek	7	(3,2,2)
5	(Austria) Dany Gappmaier	6	(1,2,3)
6	(Russia) Sergey Logachev	5	(2,3,U)
7	(Hungary) József Tabaka	5	(2,1,2)
8	(United Kingdom) Danny King	4	(T,1,3)
9	(Germany) Kevin Wölbert	4	(1,2,1)
10	(Czech Republic) Hynek Štichauer	3	(1,2,W)
11	(Czech Republic) Tomáš Suchánek	3	(2,W,1)
12	(Latvia) Artjoms Trofimovs	2	(W,0,2)
13	(Germany) Erik Riss	2	(2,W.-)
14	(Slovenia) Žiga Kovačič	2	(1,1,0)
15	(France) Xavier Muratet	2	(D,1,1)
16	(Germany) Michael Härtel	0	(D,0,W)
17	(Germany) Mark Riss	0	(D,-,W)

- The meeting was abandoned after 12 heats. Result stood.

== Semi-finals ==
=== Semi-final 1 ===
- 28 May 2016
- (Croatia) Goričan

Pos.	Rider	Points	Details
1	(Poland) Piotr Pawlicki Jr.	15	(3,3,3,3,3)
2	(Poland) Krzysztof Kasprzak	14	(2,3,3,3,3)
3	(Denmark) Kenneth Bjerre	11	(3,3,1,3,1)
4	(Australia) Sam Masters	11	(3,2,2,3,1)
5	(Poland) Krzysztof Buczkowski	9	(1,1,3,2,2)
6	(Sweden) Peter Ljung	9	(2,2,1,2,2)
7	(Denmark) Hans N. Andersen	8	(1,1,2,1,3)
8	(Slovakia) Martin Vaculík	7+3	(0,3,0,2,2)
9	(Czech Republic) Václav Milík	7+2	(1,2,2,2,D)
10	(Latvia) Andžejs Ļebedevs	7+1	(0,2,1,1,3)
11	(Ukraine) Andrey Karpov	7+0	(2,1,3,0,1)
12	(Finland) Timo Lahti	4	(3,0,1,0,0)
13	(Sweden) Kim Nilsson	4	(0,1,0,1,2)
14	(Croatia) Jurica Pavlic	4	(2,0,0,1,1)
15	(Germany) Kai Huckenbeck	2	(W,0,2,0,0)
16	(Hungary) József Tabaka	0	(W,0,0,0,0)
	(Denmark) Anders Thomsen	DNR	
	(United Kingdom) Danny King	DNR	

=== Semi-final 2 ===
- 2 July 2016
- (Italy) Lonigo

Pos.	Rider	Points	Details
1	(Poland) Patryk Dudek	9	(3,3,3)
2	(Poland) Tomasz Jędrzejak	8	(2,3,3)
3	(Australia) Max Fricke	7	(3,1,3)
4	(Italy) Nicolás Covatti	7	(3,2,2)
5	(United Kingdom) Robert Lambert	6	(3,3,0)
6	(Australia) Brady Kurtz	6	(1,3,2)
7	(Germany) Martin Smolinski	5	(0,2,3)
8	(Denmark) Mikkel Bech Jensen	5	(2,2,1)
9	(United Kingdom) Craig Cook	4	(2,0,2)
10	(Sweden) Tomas H. Jonasson	4	(1,1,2)
11	(Denmark) Michael Jepsen Jensen	4	(1,2,1)
12	(Sweden) Fredrik Lindgren	3	(2,0,1)
13	(Poland) Bartosz Zmarzlik	2	(1,1,W)
14	(Italy) Michele Paco Castagna	1	(0,0,1)
15	(Ukraine) Stanislaw Mielniczuk	1	(-,-,1)
16	(Russia) Sergey Logachev	0	(0,0,U)
17	(Austria) Dany Gappmaier	0	(0,T,0)

- The meeting was abandoned after 12 heats. Result stood.

== 2016 Speedway Grand Prix Challenge ==
=== Grand Prix Challenge ===
- 3 September 2016
- (Sweden) Vetlanda
- Lindgren and Vaculík were nominated as wildcards.

Pos.	Rider	Points	Details
1	(Poland) Patryk Dudek	15	(3,3,3,3,3)
2	(Slovakia) Martin Vaculík	14	(3,2,3,3,3)
3	(Sweden) Fredrik Lindgren	11+3	(2,3,2,2,2)
4	(Denmark) Kenneth Bjerre	11+2	(1,3,2,3,2)
5	(Germany) Martin Smolinski	10	(2,2,2,1,3)
6	(Sweden) Peter Ljung	9	(0,3,3,2,1)
7	(Poland) Krzysztof Kasprzak	7	(1,0,3,3,0)
8	(Italy) Nicolás Covatti	7	(0,2,R,2,3)
9	(Poland) Piotr Pawlicki Jr.	6	(3,2,1,0,-)
10	(Australia) Max Fricke	6	(2,1,1,0,2)
11	(Australia) Sam Masters	5	(3,1,0,1,0)
12	(Denmark) Mikkel Bech Jensen	5	(2,0,0,2,1)
13	(Australia) Brady Kurtz	5	(0,1,2,1,1)
14	(Poland) Krzysztof Buczkowski	5	(1,1,1,1,1)
15	(Poland) Tomasz Jędrzejak	3	(F,0,1,R,2)
16	(United Kingdom) Robert Lambert	1	(1,0,0,0,0)
17	(Czech Republic) Václav Milík	0	(-,-,-,-,R)

== See also ==
- 2016 Speedway Grand Prix
