= Austrian Individual Speedway Championship =

British motorcycle speedway rider

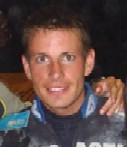
- Manuel Hauzinger
- Sport: Motorcycle speedway
- Founded: 1948
- Most titles: Manuel Hauzinger (8)

The Austrian Individual Speedway Championship is a Motorcycle speedway championship held each year to determine the Austrian national champion.

Records before World War II are incomplete, it is believed that Leopold Killmeyer was the first winner in 1930 and a 1934 article states he was champion of Austria at the time.

== Past winners ==
Year	Winner
1948	Fritz Dirtl
1951	Fritz Dirtl
1952	Leopold Killmeyer
1953	Josef Kamper
1955	Josef Kamper
1957	Josef Kamper
1958	Josef Kamper
1959	Josef Kamper
1960	Erich Luther
1961	Wilfried Vacano
1962	Josef Bössner
1963	Josef Bössner
1964	Alfred Sitzwohl
1965	Johann Kuhr
1970	Alfred Rinzner
1971	Josef Haider
1973	Josef Bössner
1974	Josef Haider
1975	Adi Funk
1976	Hubert Fischbacher
1977	Herbert Szerecs
1978	Herbert Szerecs
1979	Hubert Fischbacher
1980	Adi Funk
1981	Adi Funk
1982	Adi Funk
1983	Toni Pilotto
1984	Toni Pilotto
1985	Siegfried Eder
1986	Heinrich Schatzer
1987	Heinrich Schatzer
1988	Heinrich Schatzer
1989	Toni Pilotto
1990	Heinrich Schatzer
1991	Andreas Bössner
1992	Andreas Bössner
1993	Andreas Bössner
1994	Franz Leitner
1995	Franz Leitner
1996	Andreas Bössner
1997	Andreas Bössner
1998	Andreas Bössner
1999	Toni Pilotto
2000	Walter Nebel
2001	Walter Nebel
2002	Manuel Hauzinger
2003	Fritz Wallner
2004	Manuel Hauzinger
2005	Manuel Hauzinger
2006	Manuel Hauzinger
2007	Manuel Hauzinger
2008	Manuel Hauzinger
2009	Manuel Hauzinger
2010	Manuel Hauzinger
2011	Lukas Simon
2012	Johannes Fiala
2013	Dany Gappmaier
2014	Fritz Wallner
2015	Dany Gappmaier
2016	Dany Gappmaier
2017	Dany Gappmaier
2018	Dany Gappmaier
2019	Dany Gappmaier
2020	not held
2021	

== See also ==
- Sport in Austria
