= 2010 Bronze Helmet (Poland) =

Speedway event

The 2010 Bronze Helmet (Polish: Turniej o Brązowy Kask, BK) is the 2010 version of the Bronze Helmet speedway event organized by the Polish Motor Union (PZM). The Final take place on 5 August at Alfred Smoczyk Stadium in Leszno and was won by Patryk Dudek of Zielona Góra who beat Maciej Janowski of Wrocław and Przemysław Pawlicki of Gorzów Wielkopolski.

== Semi-final ==
=== Rzeszów ===
- (Poland) Rzeszów
- 8 July 2010
- Referee: Zdzisław Fyda (Kraków)
- Beat Time: 69.46 - Przemysław Pawlicki in Heat 11
- Attendance: 400
- Changes:

Draw 6. Kamil Pulczyński (TOR) → Reserve 17. Dawid Bąk
Draw 11. Patryk Kociemba (WRO) → Reserve 18. Łukasz Bojarski
Draw 12. Rafał Malczewski (CZE) → Mateusz Wieczorek
Draw 16. Kacper Rogowski (ZIE) → Reserve 19. Artur Czaja

Pos.	Rider	Points	Details
1	(8) Przemysław Pawlicki (GOR)	15	(3,3,3,3,3)
2	(5) Emil Pulczyński (TOR)	14	(2,3,3,3,3)
3	(3) Mateusz Łukaszewski (LES)	11	(3,3,2,0,3)
4	(9) Mateusz Domański (RYB)	11	(2,2,1,3,3)
5	(16) Artur Czaja (CZE)	10	(2,2,3,2,1)
6	(14) Adam Strzelec (ZIE)	9	(1,3,0,3,2)
7	(15) Tadeusz Kostro (LUB)	9	(3,2,2,X,2)
8	(10) Marcin Bubel (CZE)	9	(3,2,2,1,1)
9	(2) Jakub Jamróg (TAR)	7+3	(2,0,1,2,2)
10	(7) Paweł Parys (GOR)	7+2	(1,1,3,2,0)
11	(6) Dawid Bąk (OST)	6	(0,1,1,2,2)
12	(1) Łukasz Kret (RZE)	5	(1,1,2,1,R)
13	(12) Mateusz Wieczorek (KRO)	3	(1,1,T,X,1)
14	(4) Łukasz Lesiak (TAR)	3	(0,0,1,1,1)
15	(13) Adrian Wojewoda (ZIE)	1	(X,0,0,1,0)
16	(11) Łukasz Bojarski (CZE)	0	(R,-,-,-,-)

=== Gniezno ===
- (Poland) Gniezno
- 8 July 2010
- Referee: Krzysztof Meyze
- Beat Time: 64.71 - Maciej Janowski in Heat 10
- Attendance: 500
- Change:

Draw 14. Kamil Cieślar (CZE) → Reserve 17. Maciej Fajfer

Pos.	Rider	Points	Details
1	(5) Maciej Janowski (WRO)	15	(3,3,3,3,3)
2	(1) Bartosz Zmarzlik (GOR)	12	(3,0,3,3,3)
3	(3) Kacper Gomólski (GNI)	11	(1,3,3,2,2)
4	(13) Patryk Dudek (ZIE)	10	(3,2,3,2,-)
5	(2) Tobiasz Musielak (RAW)	10	(2,3,1,1,3)
6	(8) Łukasz Cyran (GOR)	9	(X,2,2,3,2)
7	(10) Szymon Woźniak (BYD)	9	(3,2,2,1,1)
8	(12) Damian Adamczak (BYD)	9	(1,3,2,2,1)
9	(11) Marcel Szymko (GDA)	7+3	(2,1,2,0,2)
10	(7) Patryk Malitowski (WRO)	7+2	(2,2,1,1,1)
11	(16) Adrian Osmólski (CZE)	6	(2,1,1,0,2)
12	(18) Wojciech Lisiecki (GNI)	5	(2,3)
13	(4) Marcin Wawrzyniak (GNI)	3	(R,0,0,3,0)
14	(9) Mikołaj Curyło (BYD)	2	(0,1,0,1,0)
15	(17) Maciej Fajfer (GNI)	2	(R,0,1,0,1)
16	(6) Kamil Adamczewski (LES)	2	(1,1,X,-,-)
17	(15) Łukasz Sówka (ZIE)	1	(1,0,0,0,0)
18	(19) Michał Rowiński (WRO)	0	(X)

Reserve 18 - in Heats 16 and 19
Reserve 19 - in Heat 19

unknown gate for reserve riders in heat 19

== The Final ==
- (Poland) Leszno, Alfred Smoczyk Stadium
- 5 August 2009
- Referee: Tomasz Proszowski
- Beat Time: 61.41 - Patryk Dudek in Heat 10
- Attendance: 800
- Change:

Draw 13. injured one day before the Final, at the League of Juniors Damian Adamczak (BYD) → Reserve

Placing	Rider	Total	1	2	3	4	5	6	7	8	9	10	11	12	13	14	15	16	17	18	19	20	Pts	Pos
1	(2) Patryk Dudek (ZIE)	15	3					3				3				3				3			15	1
2	(5) Maciej Janowski (WRO)	14		3			3					2					3					3	14	2
3	(14) Przemysław Pawlicki (GOR)	13				3		2					3		3							2	13	3
4	(8) Łukasz Cyran (GOR)	12		2						3			2			2			3				12	4
5	(11) Kacper Gomólski (GNI)	10			2				3		3					1						1	10	5
6	(9) Bartosz Zmarzlik (GOR)	8			0		2						1					3		2			8	6
7	(3) Mateusz Łukaszewski (LES)	8	2						2				0				2				2		8	7
8	(15) Szymon Woźniak (BYD)	8				2			1			1						2	2				8	8
9	(6) Tobiasz Musielak (RAW)	7		1				1			2							R			3		7	9
10	(13) Marcel Szymko (GDA)	6				1	1							3		0					1		6	10
11	(12) Emil Pulczyński (TOR)	5			3					2		0			Fx						-		5	11
12	(1) Mateusz Domański (RYB)	5	1				0				1				2				1				5	12
13	(7) Tadeusz Kostro (LUB)	4		0					R					2	1					1			4	13
14	(4) Artur Czaja (CZE)	3	0							1				1				1				0	3	14
15	(10) Adam Strzelec (ZIE)	2			1			0						X			1		0				2	15
16	(16) Marcin Bubel (CZE)	0				0				0	0						0			0			0	16
17	(17) Jakub Jamróg (TAR)	0																			0		0	17
Placing	Rider	Total	1	2	3	4	5	6	7	8	9	10	11	12	13	14	15	16	17	18	19	20	Pts	Pos

m - exclusion for exceeding two minute time allowance • t - exclusion for touching the tapes • x - other exclusion • e - retired or mechanical failure • f - fell • ns - non-starter • nc - non-classify

gate A - inside	gate B	gate C	gate D - outside

== See also ==
- 2010 Individual Speedway Junior Polish Championship
