= Cliff Parkinson =

English speedway rider

- Born: 1 February 1907; Middlesbrough, England
- Died: 4 May 1993 (aged 86)
- Nationality: British (English)

Career history
- 1930–1931, 1933, 1936–1939: Wembley Lions
- 1933: Clapton Saints
- 1934, 1947: Harringay Tigers
- 1935: Hackney Wick Wolves
- 1936: Cardiff White City
- 1936: Nottingham
- 1947: West Ham

Team honours
- 1931: Southern League
- 1931: National Trophy

George Clifford Parkinson (1 February 1907 – 4 May 1993) was a motorcycle speedway rider from England. He earned 17 international caps for the England national speedway team and 7 caps for the Great Britain team.

== Career ==
Parkinson began his speedway career during the early years of the sport in Britain in 1930. He was a window dresser by trade in a London drapery store but gave up his job to follow his brother Ronnie Parkinson into the sport. He began to practice at Middlesbrough speedway under Harry Whitfield's training, and in April 1930, he was signed by Wembley Lions for the 1930 Speedway Southern League. He went to Spain in the summer of 1930 to continue his tuition as a Wembley rider.

Parkinson was retained by Wembley for the 1931 Speedway Southern League and was part of their squad that won the league and National Trophy double.

The 1932 season saw the formation of the National League and Parkinson was transferred from Wembley to Plymouth Tigers but chose instead to go back to Spain to ride, where he became a popular exhibition rider.

Parkinson returned to Britain and signed on with the Clapton Saints for the 1933 Speedway National League. After the winter racing in Australia, he raced with Harringay Tigers during the 1934 Speedway National League.

Parkinson rode for England against Australia in the first official test match on 15 December 1934, in Sydney, although he had taken part in unofficial internationals against Australia before. He later rode for Hackney Wick Wolves (1935), Cardiff White City, and Nottingham (1936) before returning to Wembley.

Parkinson's career was interrupted by the outbreak of World War II, but after the war, he did ride for West Ham Hammers in 1947.

== Players cigarette cards ==
Parkinson is listed as number 36 of 50 in the 1930s Player's cigarette card collection.
