= 2016 Polish speedway season =

Motorcycle racing competition

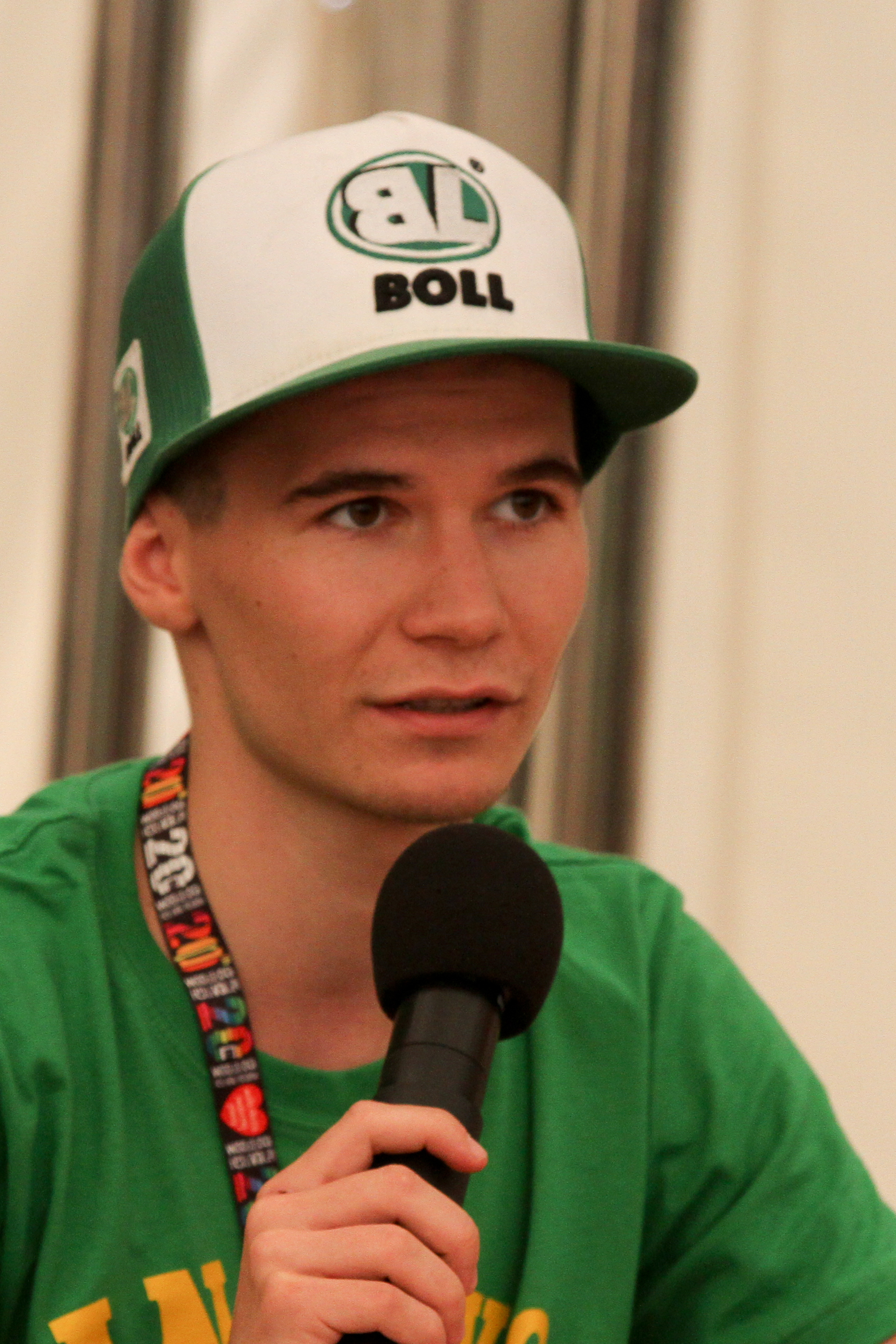
- Patryk Dudek, 2016 Polish champion and Golden Helmet winner

The 2016 Polish Speedway season was the 2016 season of motorcycle speedway in Poland.

== Individual ==
=== Polish Individual Speedway Championship ===
The 2016 Individual Speedway Polish Championship final was held on 1 July at Leszno. Patryk Dudek won the Polish Championship.

Pos.	Rider	Club	Total	Points
1	Patryk Dudek	Falubaz Zielona Góra	3,3,3,3,3	15+3
2	Piotr Pawlicki Jr.	FOGO Unia Leszno	3,3,2,1,2	11+3+2
3	Maciej Janowski	Betard Sparta Wrocław	3,0,2,2,1	8+2+1
4	Krystian Pieszczek	Falubaz Zielona Góra	2,3,3,2,2	12+0
5	Robert Miśkowiak	Orzeł Łódź	3,2,3,0,3	11+1
6	Bartosz Zmarzlik	Stal Gorzów Wlkp.	2,2,1,3,3	11+0
7	Tomasz Jędrzejak	Betard Sparta Wrocław	0,2,3,2,0	7
8	Grzegorz Zengota	FOGO Unia Leszno	2,1,0,3,1	7
9	Krzysztof Buczkowski	GKM Grudziądz	1,1,1,1,3	7
10	Norbert Kościuch	Polonia Piła	1,1,1,3,1	7
11	Przemysław Pawlicki	Stal Gorzów Wlkp.	2,w,1,1,2	6
12	Janusz Kołodziej	Unia Tarnów	0,3,0,2,0	5
13	Zbigniew Suchecki	Wanda Kraków	0,0,2,0,2	4
14	Kacper Gomólski	Get Well Toruń	1,2,0,0,1	4
15	Tobiasz Musielak	Unia Leszno	1,t,2,0,0	3
16	Marcin Nowak	GKM Grudziądz	0,1,0,1,0	2
17	Daniel Jeleniewski	Włókniarz Częstochowa	0	0
18	Damian Adamczak	Orzeł Łódź	ns	

=== Golden Helmet ===
The 2016 Golden Golden Helmet (Polish: Turniej o Złoty Kask, ZK) organised by the Polish Motor Union (PZM) was the 2016 event for the league's leading riders. The final was held at Tarnów on the 25 April. Patryk Dudek won the Golden Helmet.

Pos.	Rider	Club	Total	Points
1	Patryk Dudek	Zielona Góra	9	(3,3,3)
2	Bartosz Zmarzlik	Gorzów Wlkp.	8	(3,2,3)
3	Janusz Kołodziej	Tarnów	8	(3,3,2)
4	Krzysztof Kasprzak	Gorzów Wlkp.	7	(2,2,3)
5	Tomasz Jędrzejak	Wrocław	5	(2,3,0)
6	Piotr Pawlicki Jr.	Leszno	5	(3,0,2)
7	Krzysztof Buczkowski	Grudziądz	5	(1,1,3)
8	Maksym Drabik	Wrocław	4	(1,3,0)
9	Michał Szczepaniak	Piła	4	(0,2,2)
10	Maciej Janowski	Wrocław	4	(2,1,1)
11	Piotr Protasiewicz	Zielona Góra	4	(2,1,1)
12	Przemysław Pawlicki	Gorzów Wlkp.	4	(1,2,1)
13	Damian Baliński	Rybnik	2	(0,ef,2)
14	Mateusz Szczepaniak	Kraków	2	(1,1,0)
15	Norbert Kościuch	Piła	1	(0,0,1)
16	Krystian Pieszczek	Zielona Góra	0	(w,0,0)
17	Sebastian Ułamek	Częstochowa	ns	
18	Arkadiusz Madej	Tarnów	ns	

=== Junior Championship ===
- winner - Daniel Kaczmarek

=== Silver Helmet ===
- winner - Krystian Pieszczek

=== Bronze Helmet ===
- winner - Bartosz Smektała

== Pairs ==
=== Polish Pairs Speedway Championship ===
The 2016 Polish Pairs Speedway Championship was the 2016 edition of the Polish Pairs Speedway Championship. The final was held on 8 April at Rawicz.

Pos	Team	Pts	Riders
1	Wrocław	24	Szymon Woźniak 11, Tomasz Jędrzejak 13
2	Leszno	23+3	Piotr Pawlicki Jr. 17+3, Janusz Kołodziej 4, Grzegorz Zengota 2
3	Toruń	23+2	Adrian Miedziński 17, Paweł Przedpełski 6
4	Rybnik	21	Damian Baliński 16, Kacper Woryna 5
5	Tarnów	15	Jakub Jamrog 10, Artur Czaja 5
6	Gdańsk	13	Oskar Fajfer 10, Hubert Legowik 3
7	Rawicz	7	Arkadiusz Pawlak 7, Marek Lutowicz 0

== Team ==
=== Team Speedway Polish Championship ===
The 2016 Team Speedway Polish Championship was the 2016 edition of the Team Polish Championship. Stal Gorzów Wielkopolski won the gold medal. The team included Bartosz Zmarzlik and Krzysztof Kasprzak.

==== Ekstraliga ====
Pos	Team	P	W	D	L	Pts	BP	Total	Diff
1	Stal Gorzów Wielkopolski	14	10	1	3	21	6	27	+111
2	Falubaz Zielona Góra	14	10	1	3	21	6	27	+101
3	KS Toruń	14	9	0	5	18	4	22	+78
4	WTS Sparta Wrocław	14	7	1	6	15	2	17	+26
5	GKM Grudziądz	14	7	0	7	14	2	16	-18
6	ROW Rybnik	14	4	1	9	9	3	12	-59
7	Unia Leszno	14	3	2	9	8	2	10	-72
8	Unia Tarnów	14	3	0	11	6	1	7	-167

Play offs

Team	Team	Team	Score
semi final	Wrocław	Gorzów	29:49 33:56
semi final	Toruń	Zielona Góra	50:40 43:47
final	Toruń	Gorzów	49:41, 39:51

==== 1.Liga ====
Pos	Team	P	W	D	L	Diff	Pts	BP	Total
1	Orzeł Łódź	18	16	0	2	32	8	40	+290
2	Lokomotiv Daugavpils (Latvia)	18	13	0	5	26	6	32	+154
3	Włókniarz Częstochowa	18	12	0	6	24	4	28	+125
4	Stal Rzeszów	18	11	0	7	22	2	24	-14
5	Polonia Piła	18	9	0	9	18	5	23	+70
6	Wybrzeże Gdańsk	18	9	0	9	18	3	21	+71
7	Wanda Kraków	18	8	0	10	16	4	20	-34
8	Polonia Bydgoszcz	18	5	0	13	10	1	11	-176
9	KSM Krosno	18	5	0	13	10	1	11	-144
10	Kolejarz Opole	11	3	0	8	6	0	6	-126
11	Kolejarz Rawicz	11	1	0	10	2	0	2	-216

Play offs

Team	Team	Team	Score
final	Daugavpils	Łódź	47:43, 44:46
