= Franz Leitner (speedway rider) =

Austrian speedway rider

- Born: 3 November 1968 (age 58); Vienna, Austria
- Nationality: Austrian

Career history
- 1994: Ipswich Witches
- 1994: Exeter Falcons

Individual honours
- 1994, 1995: Austrian Champion

Franz Leitner (born 3 November 1968) is a former motorcycle speedway rider from Austria. He earned nine caps for the Austria national speedway team.

== Career ==
Leitner rode in the British leagues during 1994 for both Ipswich Witches and Exeter Falcons, the latter on loan.

Leitner rode in the 1995 Speedway Grand Prix of Austria. He was the first Austrian to ride in the Speedway Grand Prix series.

Leitner was a two-time champion of Austria, winning the Austrian Individual Speedway Championship in 1994 and 1995.

== Results ==
=== World Championships ===
- Individual World Championship (Speedway Grand Prix)
  - 1995 - 23rd place (6 points in one event)
- Team World Championships (Speedway World Team Cup and Speedway World Cup)
  - 1994 - 4th place in Group B

=== Grand Prix ===
1995 SGP
	Grand Prix	Pos.	Pts.	Heats	Draw
1 (1)	(Austria) Wiener Neustadt	14	6	(0,0,2,3,0) +2D	16

permanent speedway rider
wild card, track reserve or qualified reserve
rider not classified (track reserve who did not start)

== See also ==
- Austria national speedway team
- List of Speedway Grand Prix riders
