= Cardiff White City speedway =

Welsh motorcycle speedway team

Club information
- Track address: White City Stadium; Sloper Road; Cardiff
- Country: Wales
- Founded: 1928
- Closed: 1936
- League: Provincial League

The Cardiff White City speedway was a motorcycle speedway organisation and later a league team. The speedway operated from 1928 until its closure in 1936. The venue was the White City Stadium also known as Sloper Road, Cardiff.

== History ==
Speedway took place at Sloper Road during the inaugural British speedway season of 1928. A speedway track was constructed in November 1928 by the Provincial Dirt Tracks Cardiff Ltd, with the first meeting held on Boxing Day 1928.

After two more seasons of speedway meetings in 1929 and 1930, it is evident that speedway ended for a four year period. Bill Clibbett won the 1930 track championship.

Although speedway returned to Cardiff in 1935, there was no league affiliation until 1936, when Mr B. Southouse (the Cardiff speedway manager for the Greyhound Racing Association) proposed that a new league be formed and organised a syndicate, including Nottingham and Liverpool speedway. The Cardiff White City team duly competed in the newly formed Provincial League. During the 1936 Provincial Speedway League season they were knocked out of the National trophy by the eventual winners Southampton Saints. This two legged fixture was incidentally the first two matches ever held by the team, on 10 and 13 April respectively.

In early June, the GRA announced that due to poor attendances there would be no further meetings held at the track. The star riders, Ted Bravery, Cliff Parkinson, George Greenwood and Tommy Price all joined Nottingham. A few days later, the team without their star riders suffered an embarrassing 57–15 defeat at Plymouth on 9 June. This was their last fixture and the team pulled out of the Provincial Trophy and Provincial League, having their season record expunged.
