= Manuel Hauzinger =

Austrian speedway rider

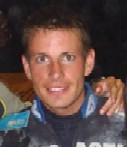
- Born: 3 December 1982 (age 43); Vienna, Austria
- Nationality: Austrian

Career history

Sweden
- 2005: Getingarna

Great Britain
- 2005: Isle of Wight
- 2006: Newcastle
- 2007, 2009: Birmingham
- 2008: Swindon

Poland
- 2002: Świętochłowice
- 2006: Rawicz
- 2007, 2009: Miskolc
- 2010: Lublin

Denmark
- 2007–2008: Fjelsted

Individual honours
- 2002, 2004-2010: Austrian champion
- 2007: Argentinian Champion

Team honours
- 2006: Swedish Allsvenskan Champion

Manuel Hauzinger (born 3 December 1982, in Vienna, Austria) is a former motorcycle speedway rider from Austria. He is an eight-time champion of Austria. and earned two caps for the Austria national speedway team.

== Career ==
Hauzinger rode in the United Kingdom for the Berwick Bandits in the Premier League. He also rode for the Swindon Robins in the Elite League, replacing Theo Pijper. He made a memorable debut for Swindon against the Eastbourne Eagles, where he scored eight points and beat Grand Prix star Scott Nicholls.

Hauzinger has won the Austrian National Championship eight times (2002, 2004, 2005, 2006, 2007, 2008, 2009 and 2010) and represented Austria in the 2004 Speedway World Cup. He also won the 2007 Argentine Championship.

== Honours ==
- Speedway World Cup (Team World Championship):
  - 2004 - 4th place in Qualifying Round 2 (6 points)
- Individual European Championship:
  - 2007 - 9th place (7 points)
  - 2008 - not rode in Semi-Final 1
- European Pairs Championship:
  - 2004 - 4th place in Semi-Final 1 (6 points)
  - 2007 - 6th place (12 points)
- European Club Champions' Cup:
  - 2004 - 5th place (1 point)
  - 2007 - 2nd place in Semi-Final 1 (18 points)
- Hungarian Championship
  - 2001 - 14th place (5 points)
  - 2003 - 14th place (16 points)
  - 2004 - 5th place (57 points)
  - 2005 - 18th place (6 points)
  - 2011 - 8th place (14 points)

== See also ==
- Austria national speedway team
