= 2008 Swedish speedway season =

Motorcycle racing competition

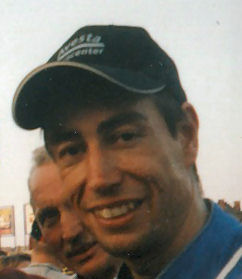
- Magnus Zetterström became the Swedish champion.

The 2008 Swedish speedway season was the 2008 season of motorcycle speedway in Sweden.

== Individual ==
=== Individual Championship ===
The 2008 Swedish Individual Speedway Championship final was held in Avesta on 8 August. Magnus Zetterström won the Swedish Championship. The final was abandoned due to rain and the scores were taken after heat 16.

Pos	Rider	Team	Pts	Total
1	Magnus Zetterström	Indianerna	(3,3,1,3,2)	10
2	Jonas Davidsson	Smederna	(1,3,2,3,3)	9
3	Thomas H. Jonasson	Vetlanda	(2,2,3,2,2)	9
4	Mikael Max	Piraterna	(2,3,3,0)	8
5	Peter Karlsson	Dackarna	(2,1,2,3)	8
6	Sebastian Aldén	Team Dalakraft	(1,2,2,3)	8
7	Billy Forsberg	Västervik	(3,1,3,0)	7
8	Andreas Jonsson	Dackarna	(3,3,1,-,-)	7
9	Freddie Lindgren	Dackarna	(1,2,3,1)	7
10	Peter Ljung	Vetlanda	(0,2,2,2)	6
11	Freddie Eriksson	Griparna	(2,1,0,2,0)	5
12	Antonio Lindbäck	Vargarna	(3,0,1,w,3)	4
13	Niklas Klingberg	Örnarna	(1,0,0,2,1)	3
14	Magnus Karlsson	Valsarna	(0,0,1,1)	2
15	Simon Gustafsson	Indianerna	(0,0,0,1)	1
16	David Ruud	Lejonen	(0,1,0,0,1)	1
17	Linus Eklöf (res)	Team Bikab	(1)	1
18	Daniel Davidsson (res)	Valsarna	(0)	0

Key

- points per race - 3 for a heat win, 2 for 2nd, 1 for third, 0 for last

=== U21 Championship ===
Ricky Kling won the U21 championship.

== Team ==
=== Team Championship ===
Lejonen won the Elitserien and were declared the winners of the Swedish Speedway Team Championship for the first time in their history.

Vargarna won the Allsvenskan after winning the play offs.

Elitserien
Pos	Team	Pts
1	Lejonen	35
2	Dackarna	31
3	Vetlanda	30
4	Piraterna	27
5	Rospiggarna	26
6	Indianerna	19
7	Västervik	17
8	Hammarby	16
9	Smederna	13
10	Masarna	11

Allsvenskan
Pos	Team	Pts
1	Griparna	14
2	Örnarna	14
3	Vargarna	14
4	Valsarna	13
5	Solkatterna	5

Play offs

Elitserien
Stage	Team	Team	Agg Score
QF	Lejonen	Indianerna	106:85
QF	Dackarna	Rospiggarna	115:77
QF	Vetlanda	Piraterna	104:88
SF	Lejonen	Piraterna	114:78
SF	Vetlanda	Dackarna	96:96
Final	Lejonen	Vetlanda	113:79

Allsvenskan
Stage	Team	Team	Agg Score
SF	Vargarna	Örnarna	114:78
SF	Valsarna	Griparna	100:92
Final	Vargarna	Valsarna	100:92

Division 1
Pos	Team	Pts
1	Team Dalakraft	36
2	Team Bikab	26
3	Njudungarna Vetlanda	26
4	Filbyterna	22
5	Stjarnorna Hallstavik	18
6	Pirates Motala	14
7	Vikingarna	14
8	Gnistora	12
9	Team Mariestad	7
10	Eldarna	5
