= Adi Funk =

Austrian speedway rider

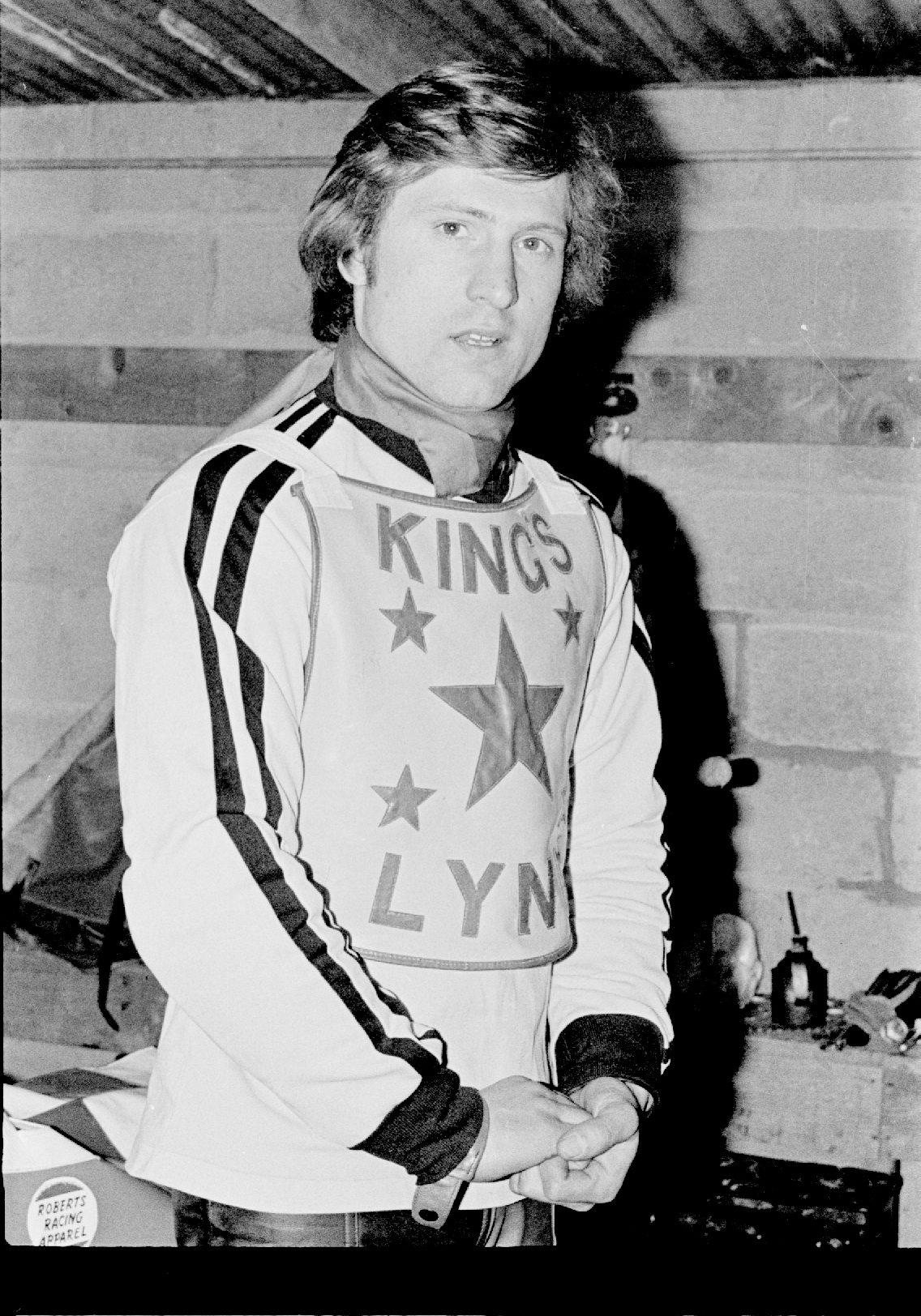
- Born: 1 July 1951; Klosterneuburg, Austria
- Died: 27 January 2010 (aged 58); Felixdorf, Austria
- Nationality: Austrian

Career history

Austria
- 1975: Blau Gelbe Stars

Great Britain
- 1976: King's Lynn Stars
- 1977: Leicester Lions

Individual honours
- 1975, 1980, 1981, 1982: Austrian Champion

Adolf "Adi" Funk (1 July 1951 – 27 January 2010) was an Austrian motorcycle speedway rider who won the Austrian Championship four times. He earned 25 caps for the Austria national speedway team.

== Biography ==
Born in Klosterneuburg, Funk rose to prominence in the early 1970s, and by 1974 had the highest average in Austrian speedway. He finished in fourth place in the Austrian Championship in 1974 and won it for the first time the following year, also winning the Austrian Pairs Championship (with Alex Taudtmann).

In 1976, Funk rode in Britain for King's Lynn Stars but struggled to score well, averaging only 2.8 over the season and was released. The following year he rode for Leicester Lions, and while his average improved, it was still below three points per match. He went on to win the Austrian Championship for three successive seasons between 1980 and 1982.

Funk also represented Austria several times.

Funk died in January 2010. A memorial meeting in his honour was held in Mureck the following year.

== World final appearances ==
=== World Pairs Championship ===
- 1975 - (Poland) Wrocław, Olympic Stadium (with Herbert Szerecz) - 7th - 10pts (6)
