= Richard Janíček =

Czech speedway rider

- Died: 21 March 2007; Divišov, Czech Republic
- Nationality: Czech

Career history

Czechoslovakia
- 1958–1968: Rudá Hvězda Praha

Individual honours
- 1958: Czechoslovakia champion

Richard Janíček (died 21 March 2007) was a Czech motorcycle speedway. He represented the Czechoslovak national speedway team.

== Speedway career ==
In 1946, Janíček started racing on road circuits.

Janíček was champion of Czechoslovakia after winning the Czechoslovakia Championship in 1958.

Janíček also won the Czechoslovak Team Speedway Championship with Rudá Hvězda Praha.

Janíček died in 2007.
