= Leopold Killmeyer =

Austrian speedway rider

- Born: 6 April 1909; Vienna, Austria
- Died: 2001 (aged 91–92)
- Nationality: Austrian

Career history

Great Britain
- 1934: Plymouth Tigers

Individual honours
- 1930, 1933?, 1952: Austrian Champion

Leopold Killmeyer (6 April 1909 – 2001) was an international motorcycle speedway rider from Austria. He was known as Poldl in speedway racing and earned three international caps for the Austria national speedway team.

== Career ==
Killmeyer born in Vienna, Austria bought his first racing bike aged 15 and was one of the early pioneers of speedway on the European continent.

Killmeyer finished runner-up in the Dirt Track Championnat du Monde (An early version of the Speedway World Championship and rival of the Star Riders' Championship) in 1933, 1934 and 1935. Records for Austrian Individual Speedway Championship before World War II are incomplete, it is believed that Killmeyer was the first winner in 1930 and a 1934 article states he was champion of Austria at the time.

Killmeyer first rode in Britain in 1933, at a meeting at West Ham Stadium. The following season in 1934, he signed for the Plymouth Tigers for the 1934 Speedway National League season. He averaged 4.75 in a season which happened to be his only one in Britain.

Killmeyer won another Austrian Individual Speedway Championship in 1952.

== Family ==
Killmeyer's younger brother Karl was also an international speedway rider.
