= Tommy Price (speedway rider, born 1911) =

British speedway rider (1911–1997)

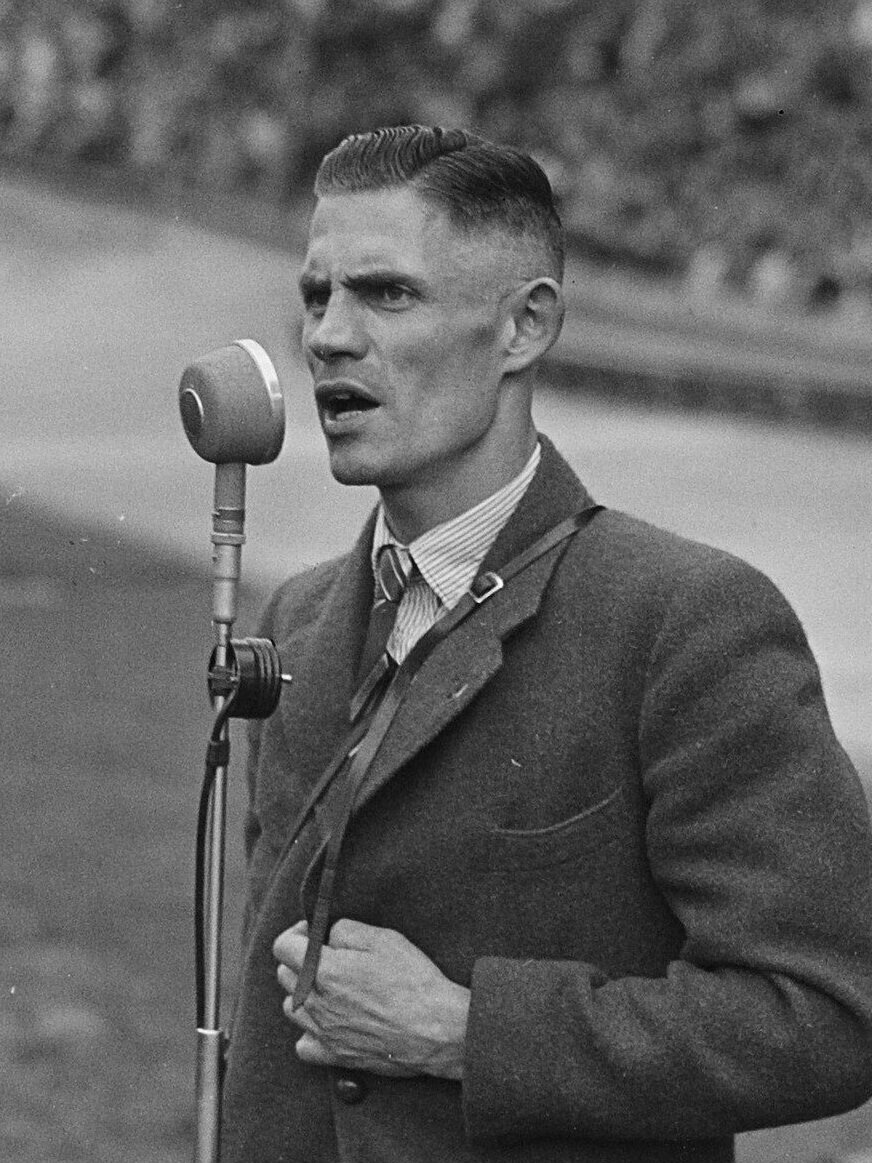
- Price at the Olympic Stadium, Amsterdam in 1950
- Born: 2 December 1911; Cambridge, England
- Died: 26 December 1997 (aged 86); Perth, Australia
- Nationality: British (English)

Career history
- 1934: Harringay Tigers
- 1935-1939, 1946-1956: Wembley Lions
- 1936: Cardiff White City
- 1936: Nottingham Wasps

Individual honours
- 1949: World Champion
- 1946: British Riders' Champion

Team honours
- 1946, 1947, 1949, 1950, 1951, 1952, 1953: National League Champion
- 1948, 1954: National Trophy winner
- 1947: British Speedway Cup winner
- 1946, 1948, 1949, 1950, 1951, 1954: London Cup winner

Thomas Price (2 December 1911 – 26 December 1997) was a motorcycle speedway rider from England. In 1949 he won the first Speedway World Championship to be held after the Second World War. He earned 23 international caps for the England national speedway team.

== Career ==
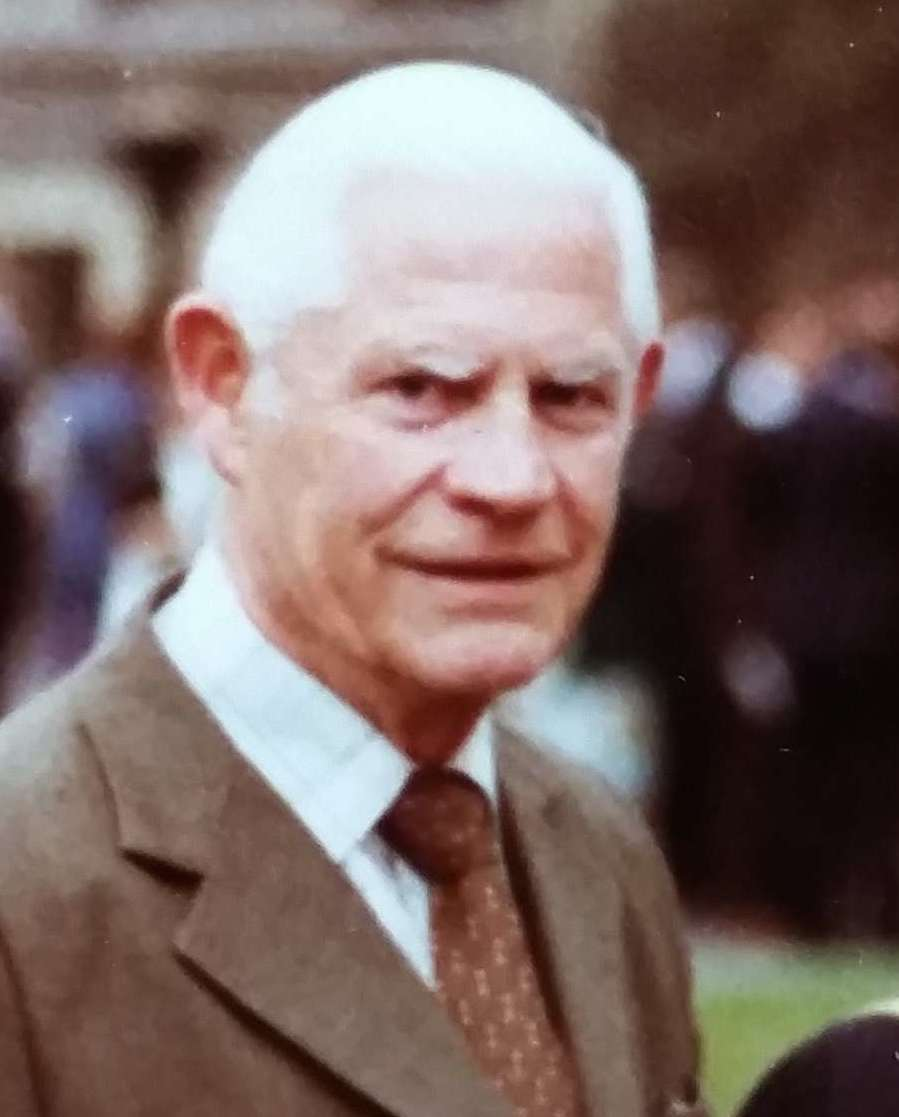
Tommy Price later in life

Born in Cambridge, England in 1911, Price's early education was at Perse School and later, at the Cambridge and County High School.

Price started his career with the Wembley Lions during the in 1935 after only a handful of appearances for Harringay Reserves in the previous season. In 1936, he was loaned out to Cardiff White City and Nottingham. Within three years he had qualified for his first World Final.

After the war, Price rejoined the Lions and spent a further eleven seasons at the club until he retired in 1956. During that he was a member of the teams that won the National League Championship seven times, and the National Trophy twice. He won the British Riders' Championship final held at Empire Stadium on 12 September 1946, in front of 85,000 spectators.

Price was selected to ride for England in the Ashes series against Australia, but never toured overseas during the winter.

Following his retirement, Price opened a small engineering workshop in Wembley, North London where he was able to produce small quantities of specialist items for riders. Often these would have been economically non-viable for larger companies and Price was seen as a saviour by many a 'Rocker' of the day. Speedway faced a crisis at the end of the 1963 season when Southampton closed, due to the stadium being sold for redevelopment. Realising that the then senior National League could not continue to operate with just six teams, Lord Shawcross was appointed to lead an enquiry into the running of the sport. It was decided amongst senior promoters that a seventh team was vital to the continuance of the sport at a senior level, and it was decided that West Ham was ripe for a re-opening. After lengthy discussions and a large cash injection funded by the promoters of other National League teams, West Ham reopened after nine years with Price at the helm as both promoter and team manager. Price continued in the role until the end of the 1965 season when he led West Ham to a unique treble, winning the British League, the KO Cup and the London Cup.

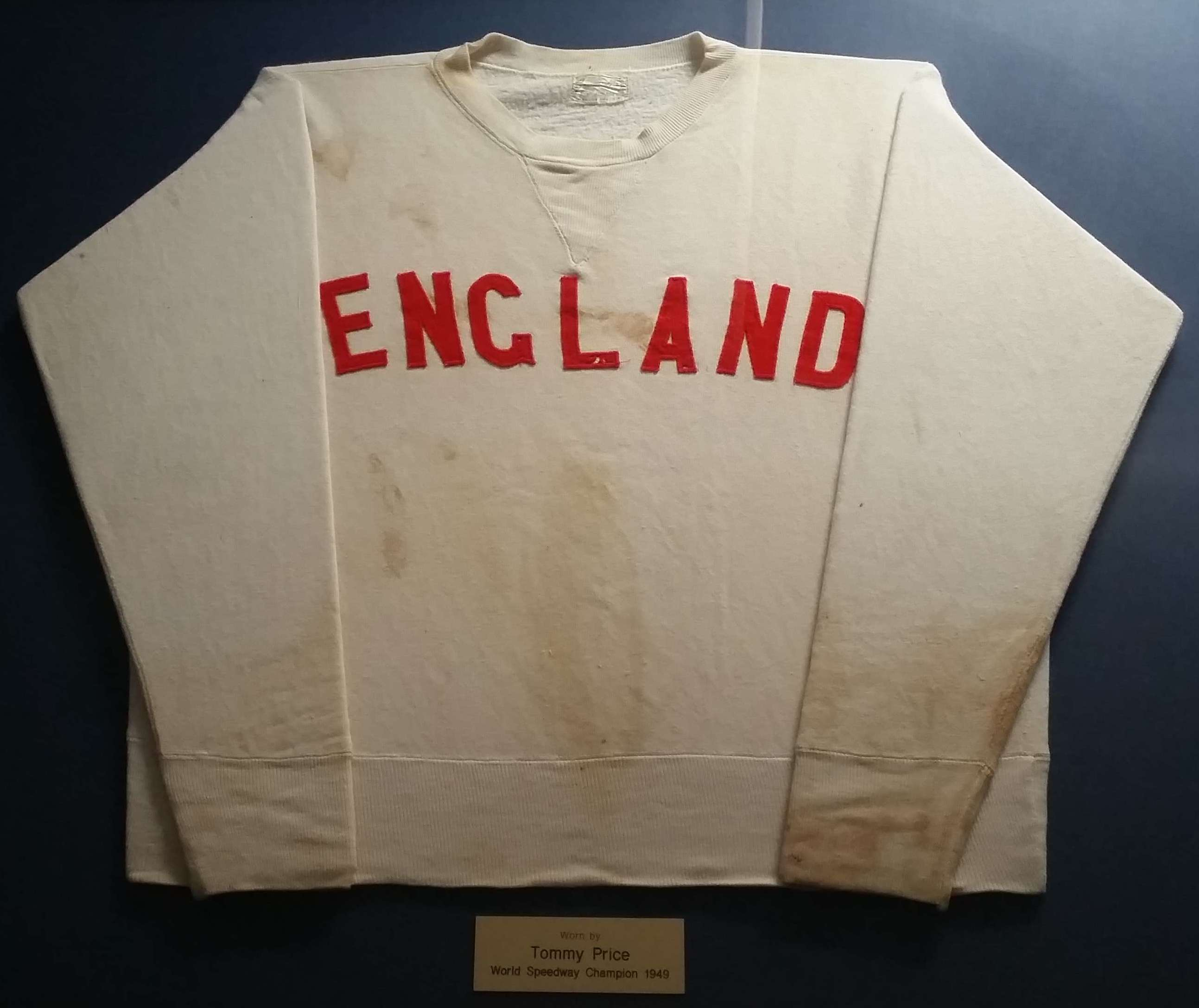
Worn by Price 1949

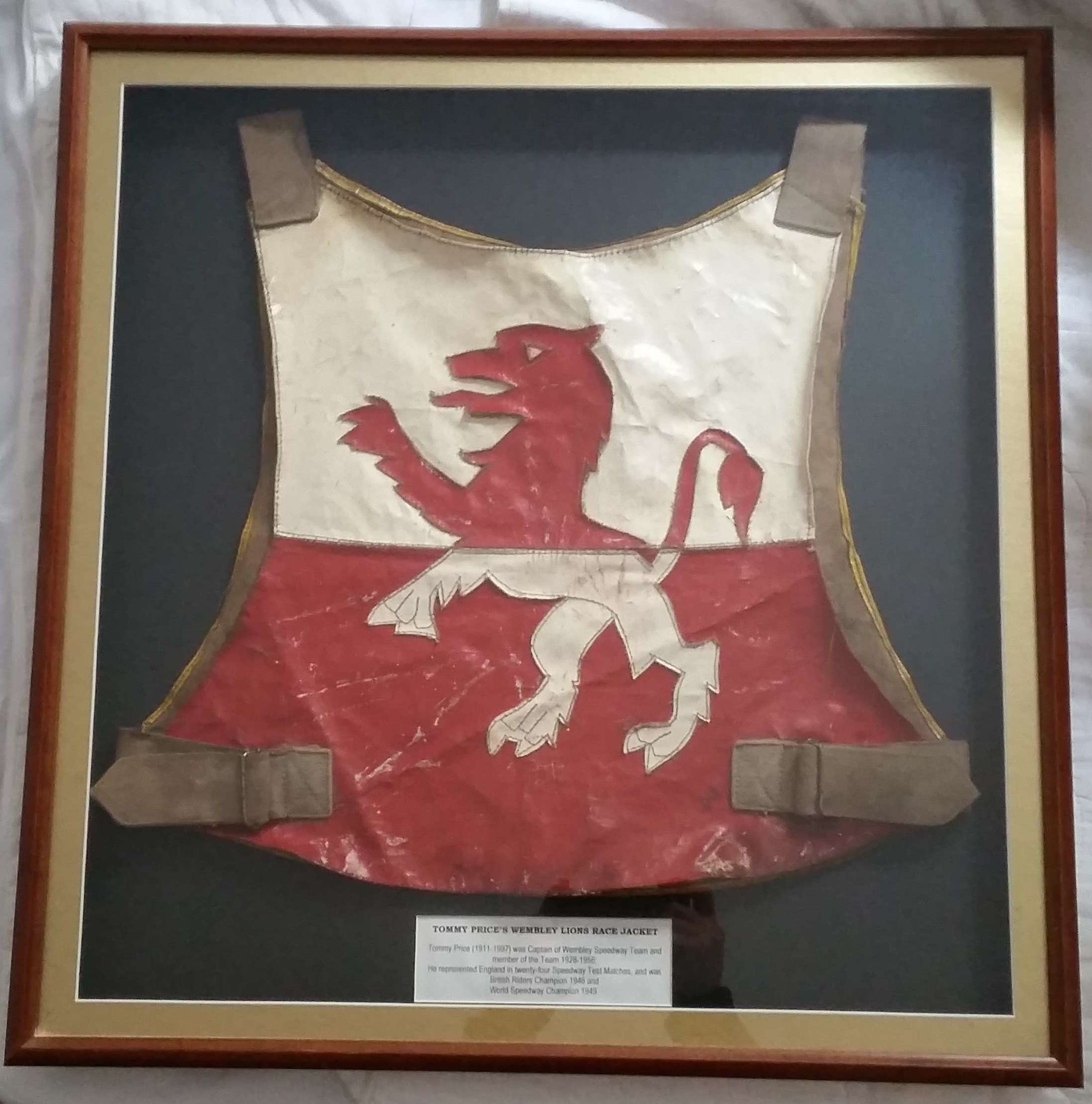
Tommy Price's Wembley Lions Race Jacket

== Retirement ==
After retiring, Price moved to Perth, Australia with his wife Margaret. He died on 26 December 1997 in Perth.

== World final appearances ==
- 1938 – (England) London, Wembley Stadium – 13th – 8pts
- 1949 – (England) London, Wembley Stadium – Winner – 15pts
- 1950 – (England) London, Wembley Stadium – 5th – 8pts
- 1954 – (England) London, Wembley Stadium – 11th – 5pts
