= Konstanty Pociejkewicz =

Polish speedway rider

Konstanty Pociejkowicz
- Born: 12 January 1932; Miranka, Poland
- Died: 18 June 2003 (aged 71)
- Nationality: Polish

Career history
- 1955–1972: Sparta (Ślęza) Wrocław

Individual honours
- 1960: Polish Champion

Konstanty Pociejkowicz (1932–2003) was an international speedway rider from Poland.

== Speedway career ==
Pociejkewicz was the champion of Poland, winning the Polish Individual Speedway Championship in 1960.

Pociejkewicz toured the United Kingdom with the Polish national team in 1966.

One of the trams known as Moderus Gamma No3317 is named after Pociejkewicz.

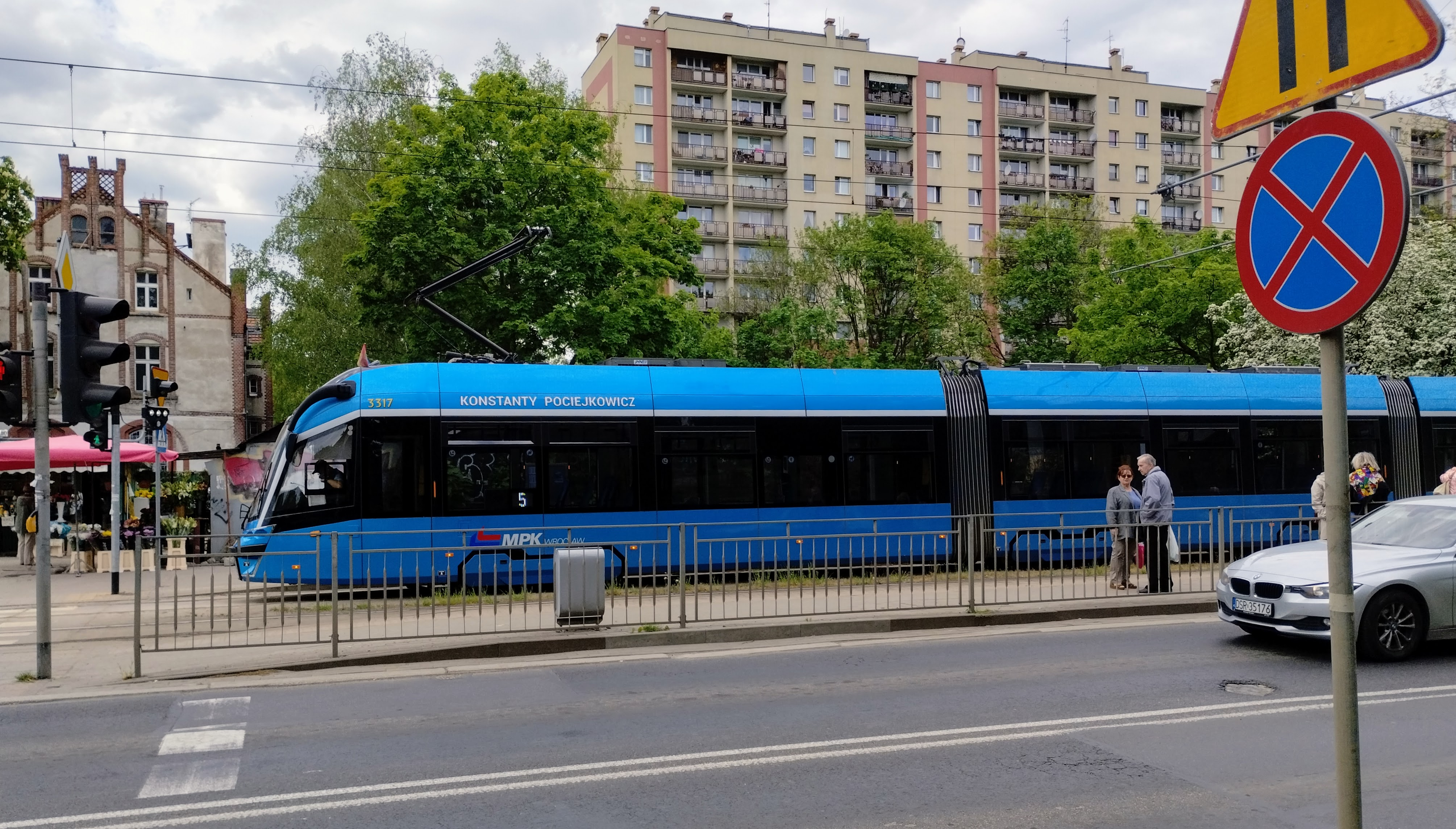
Moderus Gamma №3317
