= Bob Oakley =

British motorcycle speedway rider

- Born: 31 December 1921; Southampton, Hampshire
- Died: 1 November 1999 (aged 77); Winchester, Hampshire
- Nationality: British (English)

Career history
- 1947-1950: Southampton Saints
- 1950-1954: Wembley Lions
- 1954: Norwich Stars

Individual honours
- 1952: Speedway World Championship bronze medal

Team honours
- 1950, 1951, 1952: National League Champion
- 1948: National Trophy (tier 3)
- 1950, 1951: London Cup

Robert Lawford Oakley (1921–1999) was an English motorcycle speedway rider. He earned one international cap for the England national speedway team.

== Speedway career ==
Oakley was a leading speedway rider in the late 1950s. He reached the final of the Speedway World Championship in the 1952 Individual Speedway World Championship and went on to win the bronze medal.

Oakley rode in the top tier of British Speedway, riding for Wembley Lions who he joined from Southampton Saints for £1,500 in July 1950. With the Wembley team, he won three league championships for three consecutive years from 1950 to 1952.

== World Final appearances ==
- 1952 - (England) London, Wembley Stadium - 3rd - 12pts

== Family ==
His brother Tom Oakley was also a speedway rider.
