= Olle Andersson (speedway rider) =

Swedish speedway rider

- Born: 13 March 1932; Filipstad, Värmland, Sweden
- Died: 24 January 2017 (aged 84); Monterey, California
- Nationality: Swedish

Career history
- 1952–1953: Filbyterna
- 1954: Vikingarna
- 1955–1956: Monarkerna
- 1959–1961: Kaparna

Individual honours
- 1956: Speedway World Championship finalist

Team honours
- 1955, 1956: Allsvenskan Champion

Anders Olof Andersson also known as Olle Andersson (1932–2017) was an international speedway rider from Sweden.

== Speedway career ==
Andersson reached the final of the Speedway World Championship in the 1956 Individual Speedway World Championship.

After visiting the United States in 1957, Andersson emigrated to the United States the following year.

== World Final appearances ==
=== Individual World Championship ===
- 1956 - (England) London, Wembley Stadium - 14th - 2pts
