= Fritz Dirtl =

Austrian speedway rider

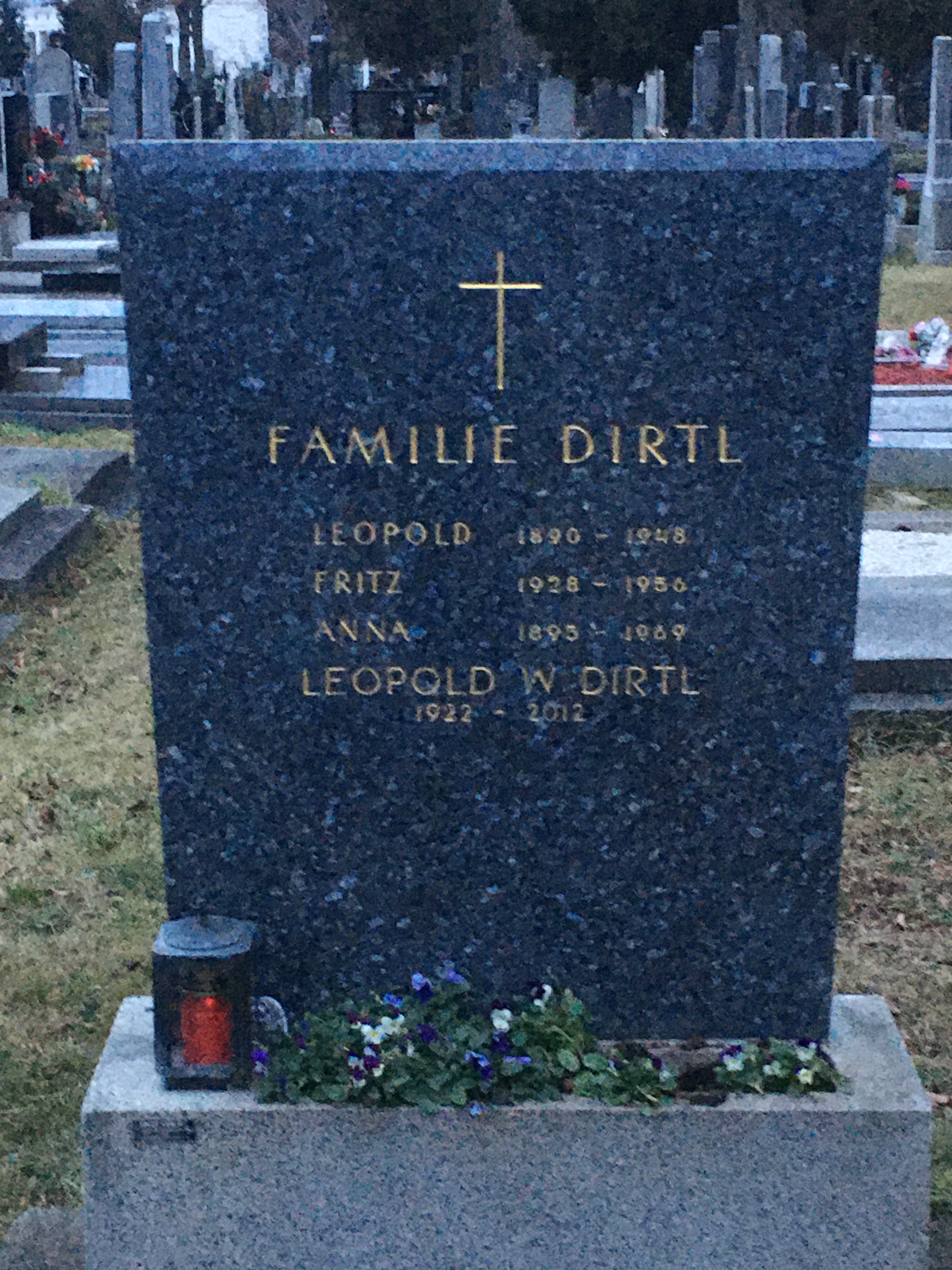
- Grave of Fritz Dirtl and his parents at the Vienna Central Cemetery
- Born: 9 January 1928; Vienna, Austria
- Died: 19 June 1956 (aged 28); Oberhausen, West Germany
- Nationality: Austrian

Individual honours
- 1948, 1951: Austrian Champion
- 1955: Continental Champion
- 1949, 1950 1951, 1952 1953, 1954: Austrian Longtrack Champion

Friedrich "Fritz" Dirtl (9 January 1928 – 19 June 1956) was an international motorcycle speedway rider from Austria.

== Career ==
Dirtl was a two-time champion of Austria after winning the Austrian Individual Speedway Championship in 1949 and 1951. He was also a six-time Longtrack champion of Austria.

Dirtl was signed by Birmingham Brummies in 1952 but was subsequently named in the Norwich Stars team before work licence issues resulted in him not racing in Britain.

== Death ==
Dirtl was killed competing in the 1956 Individual Speedway World Championship, at the Continental final stage. He was involved in a crash with fellow Austrian rider Josef Kamper and then fell into the path of Mieczysław Połukard.

== See also ==
- Rider deaths in motorcycle speedway
