= Josef Bössner =

Austrian speedway rider (c. 1934 – 2005)

- Born: c. 1934; Austria
- Died: 16 October 2005; Neusiedl am See, Austria
- Nationality: Austrian

Individual honours
- 1962, 1963, 1973: Austrian Champion

Josef Bössner (c. 1934–2005), also known as Bubi Bössner, was an international speedway rider from Austria.

== Speedway career ==
Bössner was a three-time champion of Austria after winning the Austrian Individual Speedway Championship in 1962, 1963 and 1973.

After his death in 2005, Bössner had a race named in his memory.
