= Ulf Ericsson =

Swedish speedway rider

- Born: c.1933
- Nationality: Swedish

Career history
- 1953-1954: Vargarna
- 1955-1959, 1961: Monarkerna

Individual honours
- 1955: Victorian State Champion
- 1956: Speedway World Championship finalist

Team honours
- 1953, 1954, 1955, 1956: Allsvenskan Champion

Ulf Ericsson (born c.1933) was an international speedway rider from Sweden.

== Speedway career ==
Ericsson reached the final of the Speedway World Championship in the 1956 Individual Speedway World Championship. He represented Sweden in the 1955 and 1956 Nordic Team championships.

In the Swedish Speedway Team Championship, Ericsson rode primarily for Monarkerna.

== World Final Appearances ==
=== Individual World Championship ===
- 1956 - (England) London, Wembley Stadium - 15th - 2pts
