= Dany Gappmaier =

Austrian speedway rider

- Born: 26 September 1991 (age 35); Salzburg, Austria
- Nationality: Austrian

Career history
- 2016-2019, 2021: Berwick Bandits
- 2017: Swindon Robins
- 2018: Belle Vue Aces

Individual honours
- 2013, 2015 2016, 2017 2018, 2019: Austrian champion

Daniel Gappmaier known as Dany Gappmaier (born 26 September 1991) is an Austrian speedway rider. He is a six-time champion of Austria.

== Career ==
Gappmaier signed for Berwick Bandits for the 2016 Premier League speedway season. The following season, he was retained by Berwick but also signed for Swindon Robins in the top tier of British Speedway riding for the SGB Premiership 2017.

In 2019, Gappmaier secured his sixth Austrian Individual Speedway Championship and continued to ride for the Berwick Bandits from and entered his fifth season with the club in the SGB Championship 2021.
