= Per Tage Svensson =

Swedish speedway rider (born 1931)

- Born: 16 October 1931; Falköping, Sweden
- Died: 26 May 2008 (aged 76); Mullsjö, Sweden
- Nationality: Swedish

Career history

Sweden
- 1950-1951: Falkarna
- 1952: Knallarna
- 1953-1958: Filbyterna
- 1959-1961: Vargarna
- 1962-1965: Dackarna
- 1966-1967: Örnarna

Great Britain
- 1962: Oxford Cheetahs

Individual honours
- 1963: Speedway World Championship finalist

Team honours
- 1960, 1961, 1962: Allsvenskan Champion

Per Tage Svensson (16 October 1931 – 26 May 2008), also spelt Per Thage Svensson, was an international motorcycle speedway rider from Sweden. He earned 14 caps for the Sweden national speedway team.

== Speedway career ==
Svensson reached the final of the Speedway World Championship in the 1963 Individual Speedway World Championship.

Svensson rode for Oxford Cheetahs during the 1962 Speedway National League.

== World final appearances ==
=== Individual World Championship ===
- 1963 – (England) London, Wembley Stadium – 15th – 1pt

=== World Team Cup ===
- 1961 - (Poland) Wrocław, Olympic Stadium (with Sören Sjösten / Rune Sörmander / Björn Knutson / Ove Fundin) - 2nd - 30pts (7)
