= Josef Kamper =

Austrian speedway rider

- Born: 3 April 1925; Prellenkirchen, Austria
- Died: 2 February 1984 (aged 58); Donnerskirchen, Austria
- Nationality: Austrian

Individual honours
- 1953, 1955, 1957, 1958, 1959: Austrian Champion

Josef Kamper (3 April 1925 – 2 February 1984) was an international motorcycle speedway rider from Austria. He was a member of the Austria national speedway team.

== Speedway career ==
Kamper rode for the first time during the Spring of 1940 but then became an aircraft manufacturer during World War II.

Kamper was a five times champion of Austria after winning the Austrian Individual Speedway Championship in 1953, 1955, 1957, 1958 and 1959.
