= Birger Forsberg =

Swedish motorcycle speedway rider

- Born: 25 September 1930; Skellefteå, Sweden
- Died: 31 August 2007 (aged 76); Skellefteå, Sweden
- Nationality: Swedish

Career history

Sweden
- 1951–1960: Monarkerna

Great Britain
- 1957: Rayleigh Rockets
- 1958–1959: Poole Pirates
- 1960: Ipswich Witches

Team honours
- 1955, 1956: Allsvenskan Champion
- 1952: Sweden Division Two Winner

Birger Forsberg (born 25 September 1930 – 31 August 2007) was a motorcycle speedway rider from Sweden. He earned 19 international caps for the Sweden national speedway team.

== Biography ==
Forsberg, born in Skellefteå, Sweden, raced from 1951 to 1960 for Monarkerna during his Swedish career. His first visits to Britain included a British Easter tour in 1955 and a 1956 April tour of Britain.

Forsberg began his British leagues career riding for Rayleigh Rockets during the 1957 Speedway National League season. He left Rayleigh for Poole Pirates in 1958 and stayed with the south coast team for two seasons recording averages of 7.11 and 6.85 respectively.

In 1960, Forsberg joined Ipswich Witches for his final season in British speedway.

Forsberg was a prominent rider during the qualification rounds of the Speedway World Championship throughout the 1950s and participated in the inaugural 1957 Individual Long Track European Championship final.
