= 1986 Swedish speedway season =

Motorcycle racing competition

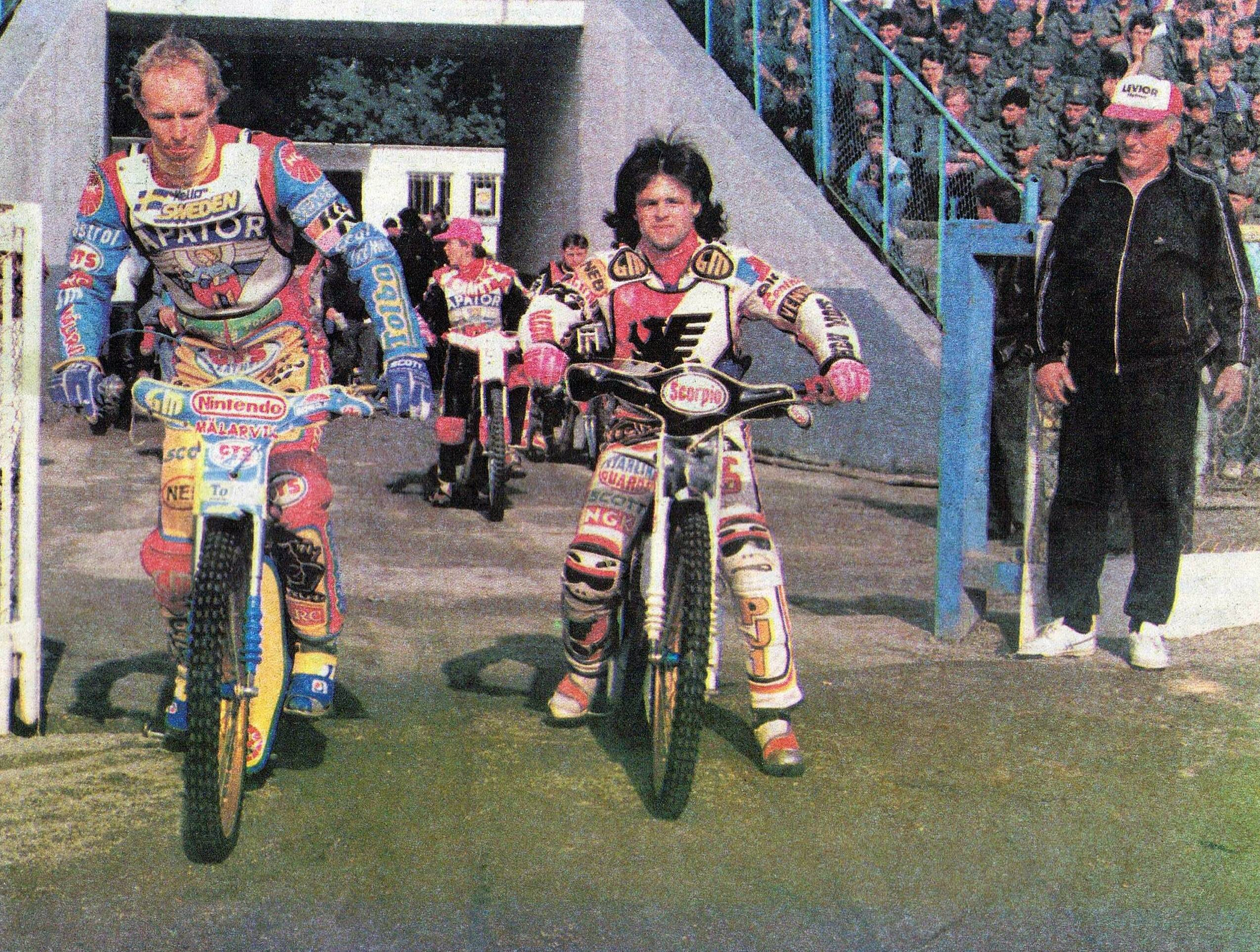
- Per Jonsson (left) won the first of his four titles in 1986

The 1986 Swedish speedway season was the 1986 season of motorcycle speedway in Sweden.

== Individual ==
=== Individual Championship ===
The 1986 Swedish Individual Speedway Championship final was held in Norrkoping on 6 September. Per Jonsson won the Swedish Championship for the first time.

| Pos | Rider | Team | Pts | Total |
|---|---|---|---|---|
| 1 | Per Jonsson | Getingarna | (3,3,3,2,3) | 14 |
| 2 | Jan Andersson | Vetlanda | (3,3,3,3,1) | 13 |
| 3 | Jimmy Nilsen | Getingarna | (3,u,3,2,3) | 11 |
| 4 | Peter Nahlin | Smederna | (2,3,2,1,2) | 10 |
| 5 | Christer Rohlen | Indianerna | (2,3,1,3,u) | 9 |
| 6 | Roland Dannö | Indianerna | (1,u,3,3,2) | 9 |
| 7 | Erik Stenlund | Getingarna | (3,2,2,0,2) | 9 |
| 8 | Conny Ivarsson | Vetlanda | (u,2,1,2,3) | 8 |
| 9 | Patrick Karlsson | Vargarna | (2,2,0,3,0) | 7 |
| 10 | Lars Anderson | Bysarna | (2,2,0,0,2) | 6 |
| 11 | Kenneth Nystrom | Vetlanda | (1,0,2,2,1) | 6 |
| 12 | Peter Karlsson | Örnarna | (0,1,2,1,1) | 5 |
| 13 | Michael Ritterwall (res) | Vetlanda | (1,0,3) | 4 |
| 14 | Jorgen Johansson | Dackarna | (0,1,0,1,1) | 3 |
| 15 | Borje Ring | Örnarna | (1,1,-,-,-) | 2 |
| 16 | Thomas Ek (res) | Vetlanda | (u,1,1,0) | 2 |
| 17 | Mikael Blixt | Vargarna | (1) | 1 |
| 18 | Hans Danielsson | Lejonen | (0,1,0,0,0) | 1 |

=== U21 Championship ===
Winner - Henrik Gustafsson

== Team ==
=== Team Championship ===
Njudungarna changed their name to Vetlanda, they won the Elitserien and were declared the winners of the Swedish Speedway Team Championship for the fifth time. The Vetlanda team included Jan Andersson, Kenneth Nyström, Conny Ivarsson and Conny Samuelsson.

Dackarna won the first division, while Valsarna and Skepparna won the second division north and south respectively.

Elitserien
| Pos | Team | Pts |
|---|---|---|
| 1 | Vetlanda | 22 |
| 2 | Getingarna | 22 |
| 3 | Indianerna | 14 |
| 4 | Bysarna | 8 |
| 5 | Vargarna | 8 |
| 6 | Örnarna | 6 |
| 7 | Solkatterna | 4 |

Div 1
| Pos | Team | Pts |
|---|---|---|
| 1 | Dackarna | 26 |
| 2 | Smederna | 26 |
| 3 | Rospiggarna | 17 |
| 4 | Lejonen | 15 |
| 5 | Gamarna | 14 |
| 6 | Piraterna | 10 |
| 7 | Tuna Rebels | 2 |
| 8 | Filbyterna | 2 |

Div 2 north
| Pos | Team | Pts |
|---|---|---|
| 1 | Valsarna | 23 |
| 2 | Masarna | 20 |
| 3 | Griparna | 14 |
| 4 | Vikingarna | 10 |
| 5 | Gävle | 8 |
| 6 | Eldarna | 8 |
| 7 | Pilarna | 1 |

Div 2 south
| Pos | Team | Pts |
|---|---|---|
| 1 | Skepparna | 24 |
| 2 | Brassarna | 12 |
| 3 | Korparna | 10 |
| 4 | Gnistorna | 7 |
| 5 | Kaparna | 7 |

== See also ==
- Speedway in Sweden
