= 1995 Swedish speedway season =

Motorcycle racing competition

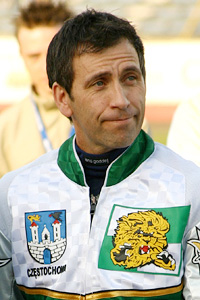
- Greg Hancock, the American helped Rospiggarna win their first Elitserien title.

The 1995 Swedish speedway season was the 1995 season of motorcycle speedway in Sweden.

== Individual ==
=== Individual Championship ===
The 1995 Swedish Individual Speedway Championship final was held at the Kumla Motorstadion in Kumla on 2 September. Henrik Gustafsson won the Swedish Championship.

Pos	Rider	Team	Pts	Total
1	Henrik Gustafsson	Indianerna	(3,3,3,3,2)	14
2	Peter Karlsson	Örnarna	(2,3,3,2,3)	13+2
3	Kenneth Lindby	Bysarna	(3,3,2,3,2)	13+1
4	Tony Rickardsson	Valsarna	(3,3,1,3,2)	12
5	Stefan Dannö	Valsarna	(3,2,2,w,3)	10
6	Daniel Andersson	Indianerna	(2,1,0,3,3)	9
7	Mikael Karlsson	Örnarna	(1,0,3,2,3)	9
8	Niklas Karlsson	Örnarna	(2,2,1,2,1)	8
9	Jimmy Nilsen	Getingarna	(1,2,0,2,1)	6
10	Magnus Zetterström	Smederna	(2,1,2,1,w)	6
11	Niklas Klingberg	Örnarna	(1,2,1,1,1)	6
12	Jorgen Johansson	Västervik	(0,0,2,1,2)	5
13	Jorgen Hultgren	Västervik	(0,1,3,0,0)	4
14	Einar Kyllingstad	Rospiggarna	(0,0,1,1,0)	2
15	Anders Kling	Dackarna	(1,1,0,0,0)	2
16	Robert Eriksson (res)	Valsarna	(1)	1
17	Stefan Andersson	Indianerna	(d,d,d,-,-)	0
18	Claes Ivarsson (res)	Vetlanda	(0) 0	

=== U21 Championship ===
Robert Eriksson won the U21 championship.

== Team ==
=== Team Championship ===
Rospiggarna won the Elitserien and were declared the winners of the Swedish Speedway Team Championship for the first time in their history. The Rospiggarna team included Greg Hancock, Erik Stenlund and Jason Crump.

Dackarna won the first division, while Karlstad and Njudungarna won the second division A and B respectively. Three more teams introduced reserve teams called Wisby (Bysarna), Buddys (Team Viking) and Göteborg (Kaparna).

Elitserien
Pos	Team	Pts
1	Rospiggarna	18
2	Indianerna	17
3	Örnarna	16
4	Bysarna	13
5	Västervik	12
6	Valsarna	12
7	Vetlanda	12
8	Smederna	12

Div 1
Pos	Team	Pts
1	Dackarna	31
2	Getingarna	30
3	Kaparna	25
4	Masarna	20
5	Vargarna	14
6	Filbyterna	14
7	Team Viking	14
8	Eskilstuna	10
9	Korparna	9
10	Nässjö	8

Div 2 A
Pos	Team	Pts
1	Karlstad	10
2	Piraterna	10
3	Gamarna	8
4	Wisby	8
5	Buddys	0

Div 2B
Pos	Team	Pts
1	Njudungarna	20
2	Husarerna	15
3	Mariestad	11
4	Stjärnorna	11
5	Gesällerna	4
6	Göteborg	2

== See also ==
- Speedway in Sweden
