= 1993 Swedish speedway season =

Motorcycle racing competition

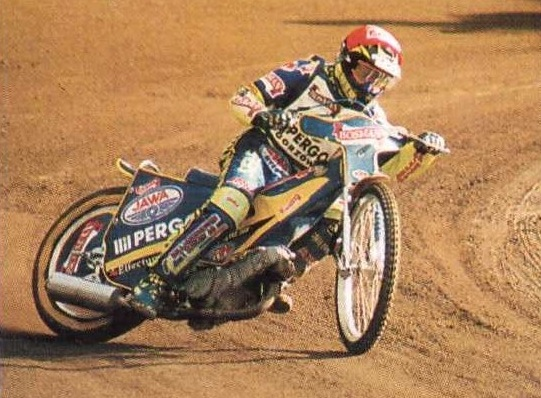
- Tony Rickardsson topped the league averages despite his team Rospiggarna finishing last in the Elitserien.

The 1993 Swedish speedway season was the 1993 season of motorcycle speedway in Sweden.

== Individual ==
=== Individual Championship ===
The 1993 Swedish Individual Speedway Championship final was held in Linkoping on 5 September. Per Jonsson won the Swedish Championship for the fourth time.

| Pos | Rider | Team | Pts | Total |
|---|---|---|---|---|
| 1 | Per Jonsson | Getingarna | (2,3,3,2,3) | 13 |
| 2 | Tony Rickardsson | Rospiggarna | (3,3,d,3,3) | 12+ |
| 3 | Henrik Gustafsson | Indianerna | (3,2,2,3,2) | 12+ |
| 4 | Erik Stenlund | Rospiggarna | (1,3,3,0,3) | 10 |
| 5 | John Cook | Indianerna | (3,1,0,3,2) | 9 |
| 6 | Mikael Karlsson | Örnarna | (1,3,2,1,2) | 9 |
| 7 | Tony Olsson | Smederna | (0,1,3,3,1) | 8 |
| 8 | Peter Nahlin | Smederna | (2,0,3,2,1) | 8 |
| 9 | Niklas Karlsson | Örnarna | (3,1,2,2,0) | 8 |
| 10 | Peter Karlsson | Örnarna | (1,2,1,2,2) | 8 |
| 11 | Raymond Smedh | Smederna | (2,2,2,1,0) | 7 |
| 12 | Stefan Dannö | Indianerna | (0,2,1,1,0) | 4 |
| 13 | Niklas Klingberg | Örnarna | (2,1,1,d,0) | 4 |
| 14 | Conny Ivarsson | Vetlanda | (0,0,0,0,3) | 3 |
| 15 | Claes Ivarsson | Vetlanda | (u,0,1,1,1) | 3 |
| 16 | Michael Ritterwall | Vetlanda | (1,0,0,d,1) | 2 |

=== U21 Championship ===
Niklas Klingberg won the U21 championship.

== Team ==
=== Team Championship ===
Örnarna won the Elitserien and were declared the winners of the Swedish Speedway Team Championship for the second successive year. The Örnarna team included Kelvin Tatum, Peter Karlsson, Christer Rohlén, Mikael Karlsson and Niklas Klingberg.

Skepparna changed their name to Västervik. Valsarna won the first division, while Korparna and Husarerna won the second division A and B respectively.

Elitserien
| Pos | Team | Pts |
|---|---|---|
| 1 | Örnarna | 25 |
| 2 | Smederna | 14 |
| 3 | Västervik | 14 |
| 4 | Bysarna | 14 |
| 5 | Indianerna | 13 |
| 6 | Getingarna | 12 |
| 7 | Vetlanda | 12 |
| 8 | Rospiggarna | 8 |

Div 1
| Pos | Team | Pts |
|---|---|---|
| 1 | Valsarna | 26 |
| 2 | Dackarna | 26 |
| 3 | Kaparna | 20 |
| 4 | Griparna | 12 |
| 5 | Filbyterna | 10 |
| 6 | Vargarna | 10 |
| 7 | Masarna | 4 |
| 8 | Piraterna | 4 |

Div 2A
| Pos | Team | Pts |
|---|---|---|
| 1 | Korparna | 16 |
| 2 | Nässjö | 12 |
| 3 | Buddys | 5 |
| 4 | Eskilstuna | 5 |
| 5 | Karlstad | 2 |

Div 2B
| Pos | Team | Pts |
|---|---|---|
| 1 | Husarerna | 23 |
| 2 | Njudungarna | 20 |
| 3 | Zaags | 15 |
| 4 | Gesällerna | 15 |
| 5 | Mariestad | 14 |
| 6 | Stjärnorna | 14 |

== See also ==
- Speedway in Sweden
