= 1991 Swedish speedway season =

Motorcycle racing competition

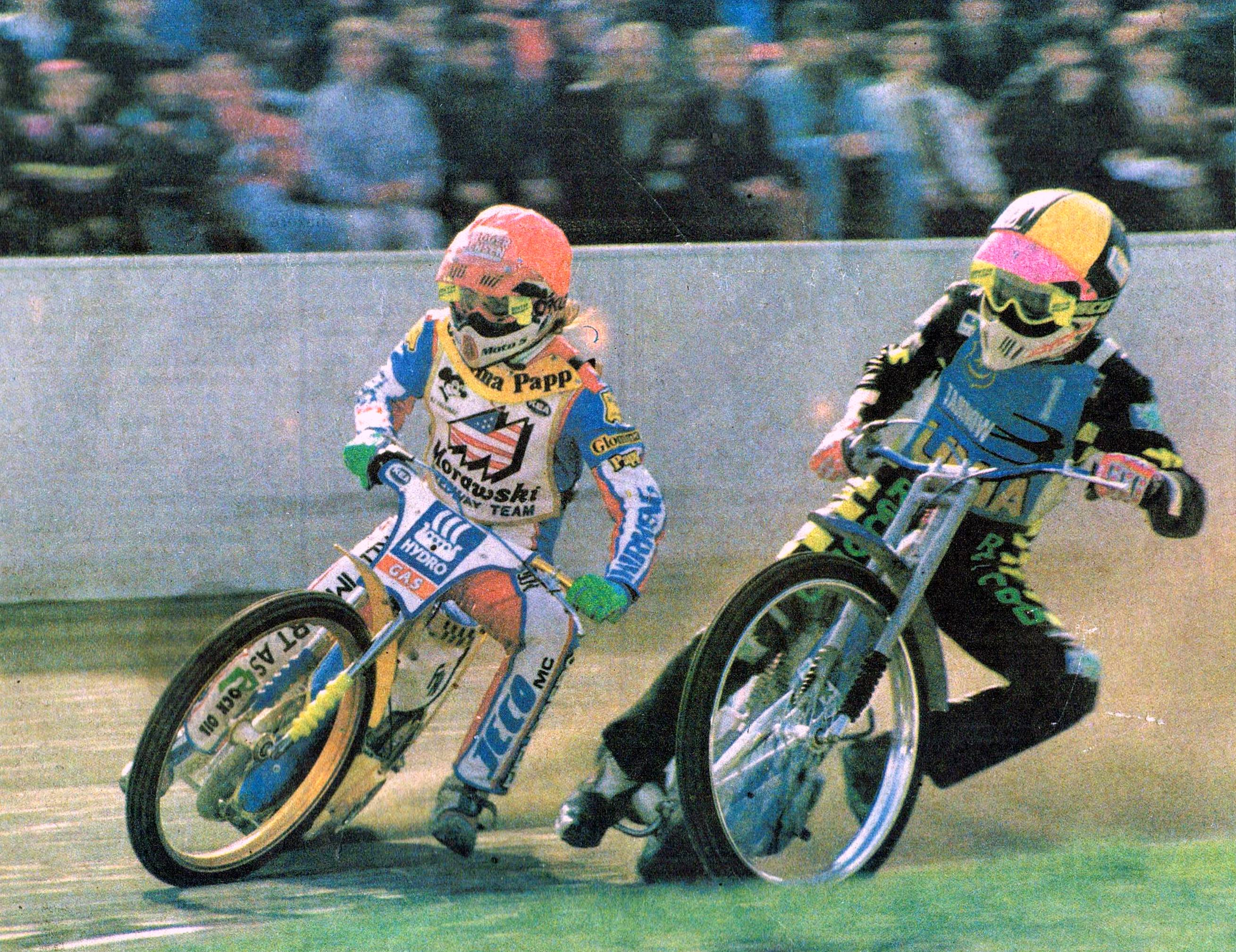
- Lars Gunnestad (left) helped Indianerna win the team title again

The 1991 Swedish speedway season was the 1991 season of motorcycle speedway in Sweden.

== Individual ==
=== Individual Championship ===
The 1991 Swedish Individual Speedway Championship final was held in Vetlanda on 21 September. Peter Karlsson won the Swedish Championship for the second time.

Pos	Rider	Team	Pts	Total
1	Peter Karlsson	Örnarna	(2,2,3,3,3)	13+3
2	Peter Nahlin	Smederna	(3,2,2,3,3)	13+2
3	Per Jonsson	Getingarna	(3,2,1,3,3)	12+3
4	Claes Ivarsson	Vetlanda	(1,3,3,3,2)	12+2
5	Tony Rickardsson	Getingarna	(2,3,3,1,1)	10
6	Joakim Karlsson	Skepparna	(3,1,2,2,2)	10
7	Tony Olsson	Bysarna	(2,3,1,2,2)	10
8	Henrik Gustafsson	Indianerna	(3,d,3,1,1)	8
9	Jimmy Nilsen	Getingarna	(1,2,2,2,0)	7
10	Erik Stenlund	Rospiggarna	(2,1,2,0,1)	6
11	Jorgen Johansson	Skepparna	(1,0,d,2,2)	5
12	Dennis Löfqvist	Bysarna	(0.3.0.1.0)	4
13	Mikael Teurnberg (res)	Rospiggarna	(3)	3
14	Patrick Karlsson	Rospiggarna	(u,0,1,0,1)	2
15	Bo Arrhen	Getingarna	(1,0,0,1,0)	2
16	Niklas Karlsson	Örnarna	(d,1,1,-,-)	2
17	Stefan Dannö	Indianerna	(0.1,d,0.0)	1
18	Christer Rohlen (res)	Indianerna	(0)	0

=== U21 Championship ===
Jorgen Hultgren won the U21 championship.

== Team ==
=== Team Championship ===
Indianerna won the Elitserien and were declared the winners of the Swedish Speedway Team Championship for the second successive season. The Indianerna team included Henrik Gustafsson, Christer Rohlén, Mikael Blixt, Lars Gunnestad and Stefan Dannö.

Brassarna changed their name to Nässjö and Örebro changed their name to Buddys. Dackarna won the first division and Kaparna won the second division.

Elitserien
Pos	Team	Pts
1	Indianerna	11
2	Getingarna	20
3	Örnarna	18
4	Bysarna	16
5	Vetlanda	16
6	Rospiggarna	14
7	Skepparna	9
8	Smederna	8

Div 1
Pos	Team	Pts
1	Dackarna	20
2	Valsarna	20
3	Vargarna	16
4	Masarna	12
5	Griparna	12
6	Karlstad	4
7	Korparna	4

Div 2
Pos	Team	Pts
1	Kaparna	18
2	Filbyterna	16
3	Nässjö	8
4	Piraterna	7
5	Gävle	7
6	Buddys	4

== See also ==
- Speedway in Sweden
