= 1999 Swedish speedway season =

Motorcycle racing competition

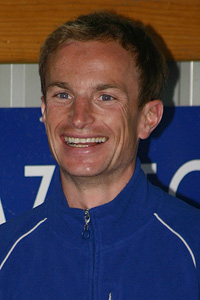
- The Norwegian Rune Holta helped Valsarna retain their Elitserien title.

The 1999 Swedish speedway season was the 1999 season of motorcycle speedway in Sweden.

== Individual ==
=== Individual Championship ===
The 1999 Swedish Individual Speedway Championship final was held in Norrkoping on 4 September. Tony Rickardsson won the Swedish Championship for the fifth time and third year in a row.

Pos	Rider	Team	Pts	Total
1	Tony Rickardsson	Masarna	(3,2,3,3,3)	14
2	Peter Karlsson	Kaparna	(3,3,2,1,3)	12+3
3	Mikael Karlsson	Valsarna	(2,2,2,3,3)	12+2
4	Niklas Klingberg	Örnarna	(3,1,3,3,1)	11
5	Andreas Jonsson	Rospiggarna	(3,3,1,2,2)	11
6	Jimmy Nilsen	Vargarna	(2,t,3,2,3)	10
7	Stefan Dannö	Valsarna	(1,3,3,0,1)	8
8	Stefan Ekberg	Vargarna	(u,2,2,2,2)	8
9	Peter Nahlin	Vargarna	(2,2,1,1,2)	8
10	Conny Ivarsson	Vetlanda	(1,3,1,1,1)	7
11	Niklas Karlsson	Vargarna	(1,1,0,3,0)	5
12	Henrik Gustafsson	Indianerna	(2,u,0,2,1)	5
13	Magnus Zetterström	Smederna	(0,0,2,ef,2)	4
14	Thomas Olsson	Örnarna	(0,1,0,1,0)	2
15	Mikael Teurnberg	Rospiggarna	(1,1,0,0,0)	2
16	Joonas Kylmäkorpi	Kaparna	(0,0,1,0,0)	1
17	Marcus Andersson (res)	Bysarna	(0)	0

Key

- points per race - 3 for a heat win, 2 for 2nd, 1 for third, 0 for last
- +3 won race off, +2 2nd in race off, +1, 3rd in race off, +0 last in race off
- ef - engine failure
- t - tape touching excluded
- u - fell
- w - excluded

=== U21 Championship ===
Joonas Kylmäkorpi won the U21 championship.

== Team ==
=== Team Championship ===
Valsarna won the Elitserien and were declared the winners of the Swedish Speedway Team Championship for the second successive year. The Valsarna team included Rune Holta, Sam Ermolenko, Stefan Dannö and Mikael Karlsson.

A change in the league structure saw the introduction of the Allsvenskan, which would form the division below the Elitserien the following season. In 1999 however, it was an additional league competition for teams finishing in the top four of division 1.

Elitserien
Pos	Team	Pts
1	Valsarna	33
2	Masarna	31
3	Rospiggarna	29
4	Smederna	26
5	Kaparna	20
6	Vargarna	20
7	Örnarna	15
8	Indianerna	14
9	Västervik	13
10	Vetlanda	10
11	Bysarna	9

Allsvenskan
Pos	Team	Pts
1	Team Svelux	12
2	Filbyterna	6
3	Karlstad	4
4	Getingarna	2

Div 1
Pos	Team	Pts
1	Filbyterna	12
2	Team Svelux	12
3	Karlstad	8
4	Getingarna	6
5	Team Viking	2

Div 2
Pos	Team	Pts
1	Piraterna	14
2	Nässjö	12
3	Lejonen	8
4	Gnistorna	6
5	Korparna	0

== See also ==
- Speedway in Sweden
