= 1994 Swedish speedway season =

Motorcycle racing competition

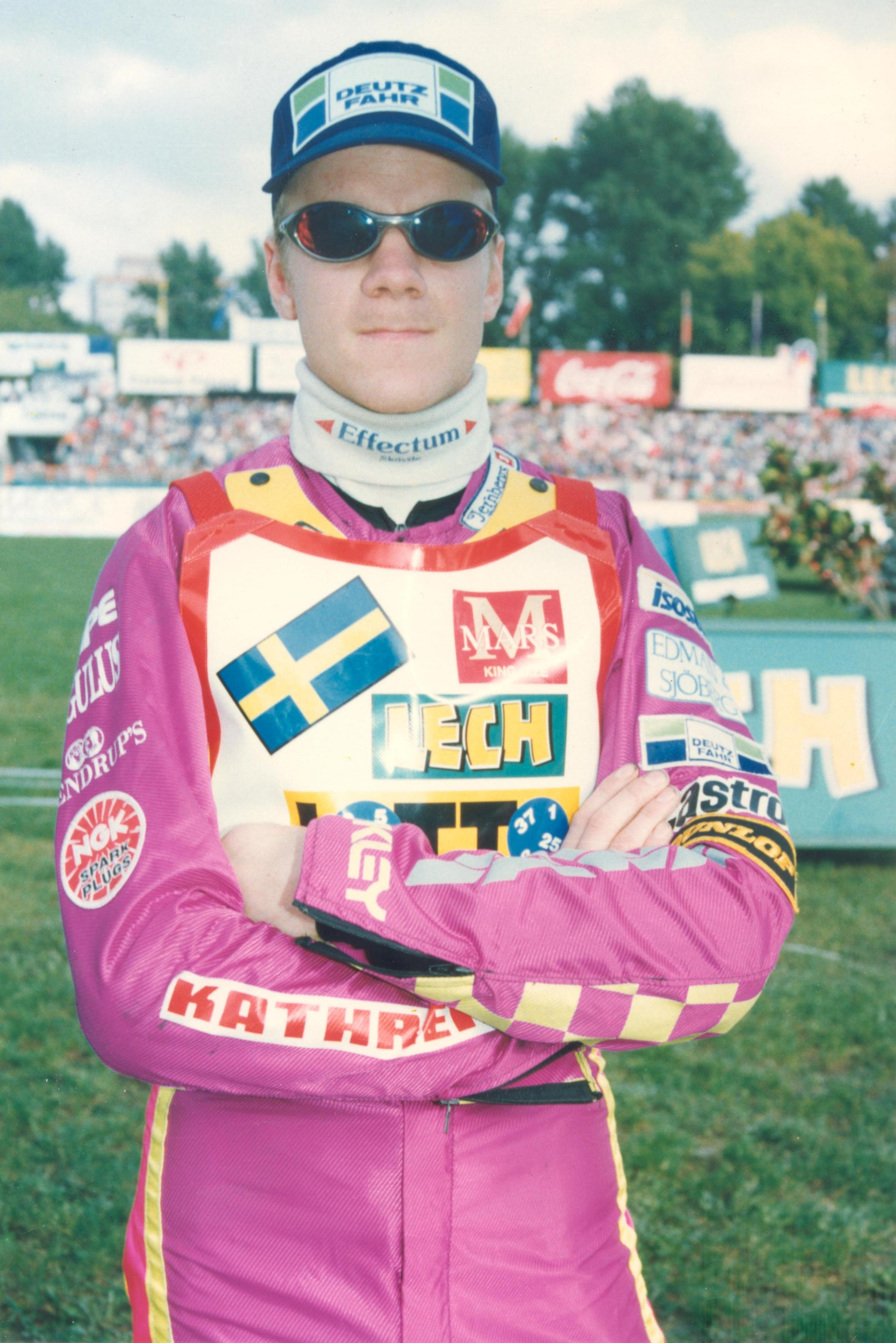
- Tony Rickardsson became the champion of Sweden for the second time.

The 1994 Swedish speedway season was the 1994 season of motorcycle speedway in Sweden.

== Individual ==
=== Individual Championship ===
The 1994 Swedish Individual Speedway Championship final was held in Västervik on 3 September. Tony Rickardsson won the Swedish Championship for the second time.

Pos	Rider	Team	Pts	Total
1	Tony Rickardsson	Valsarna	(3,3,3,3,3)	15
2	Henrik Gustafsson	Indianerna	(3,3,2,3,1)	12
3	Jimmy Nilsen	Getingarna	(2,3,1,2,2)	10+3
4	Anders Kling	Dackarna	(3,1,1,2,3)	10+2
5	Jorgen Hultgren	Västervik	(3,0,3,0,3)	9
6	Conny Ivarsson	Vetlanda	(0,3,2,3,1)	9
7	Daniel Andersson	Getingarna	(0,2,3,2,2)	9
8	Tony Olsson	Smederna	(1,2,2,1,2)	8
9	Jorgen Johansson	Västervik	(2,1,0,0,3)	6
10	Claes Ivarsson	Vetlanda	(1,2,1,d,2)	6
11	Stefan Andersson	Indianerna	(0,1,3,1,u)	5
12	Niklas Karlsson	Örnarna	(2,0,2,0,1)	5
13	Mikael Karlsson	Örnarna	(1,2,0,1,1)	5
14	Peter Nahlin	Smederna	(1,0,0,3,0)	4
15	Peter Karlsson	Örnarna	(2,1,0,1,u)	4
16	Magnus Zetterström	Smederna	(0,0,1,2,0)	3

=== U21 Championship ===
Daniel Andersson won the U21 championship.

== Team ==
=== Team Championship ===
Örnarna won the Elitserien and were declared the winners of the Swedish Speedway Team Championship for the third successive year. The Örnarna team included Kelvin Tatum, Peter Karlsson, Christer Rohlén, Mikael Karlsson and Niklas Klingberg.

Buddys changed their name to Team Viking.

Rospiggarna won the first division, while Team Viking and Njudungarna won the second division A and B respectively.

Elitserien
Pos	Team	Pts
1	Örnarna	24
2	Valsarna	14
3	Vetlanda	14
4	Indianerna	14
5	Västervik	12
6	Smederna	12
7	Bysarna	12
8	Getingarna	10

Div 1
Pos	Team	Pts
1	Rospiggarna	26
2	Kaparna	23
3	Dackarna	19
4	Korparna	16
5	Filbyterna	12
6	Vargarna	10
7	Masarna	4
8	Griparna	2

Div 2 A
Pos	Team	Pts
1	Team Viking	16
2	Eskilstuna	14
3	Nässjö	12
4	Karlstad	10
5	Gamarna	8
6	Piraterna	0

Div 2B
Pos	Team	Pts
1	Njudungarna	26
2	Husarerna	23
3	Mariestad	19
4	Gesällerna	15
5	Peking Riders	14
6	Stockholm	9

== See also ==
- Speedway in Sweden
