= 1990 Swedish speedway season =

Motorcycle racing competition

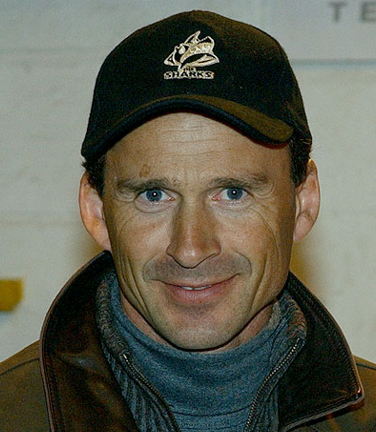
- Hans Nielsen topped the league averages for Vetlanda

The 1990 Swedish speedway season was the 1990 season of motorcycle speedway in Sweden.

== Individual ==
=== Individual Championship ===
The 1990 Swedish Individual Speedway Championship final was held in Stockholm on 22 September. Tony Rickardsson won the Swedish Championship for the first time.

Pos	Rider	Team	Pts	Total
1	Tony Rickardsson	Stockholm U	(3,3,3,3,3)	15
2	Erik Stenlund	Rospiggarna	(3,2,3,3,3)	14
3	Per Jonsson	Stockholm U	(2,3,3,2,3)	13
4	Jimmy Nilsen	Stockholm U	(1,3,3,3,d)	10
5	Peter Nahlin	Smederna	(2,2,2,2,2)	10
6	Peter Karlsson	Örnarna	(2,1,2,2,2)	9
7	Jan Andersson	Vetlanda	(2,1,2,3,in)	8
8	Dennis Löfqvist	Bysarna	(3,2,2,1,u)	8
9	Mikael Teurnberg	Rospiggarna	(1,0,1,2,3)	7
10	Conny Ivarsson	Vetlanda	(0,3,0,1,2)	6
11	Christer Rohlén	Indianerna	(3,0,1,1,1)	6
12	Jorgen Johansson	Skepparna	(0,1,1,1,2)	5
13	Niklas Karlsson	Örnarna	(1,2,0,0,0)	3
14	Anders Kling	Dackarna	(0.1,d,0.1)	2
15	Stefan Dannö	Indianerna	(1,0,1,0,0)	2
16	Bo Arrhen (res)	Stockholm U	(1)	1
17	Henrik Gustafsson	Indianerna	(u,u,w,d)	0

=== U21 Championship ===
Joakim Karlsson won the U21 championship.

== Team ==
=== Team Championship ===
Indianerna won the Elitserien and were declared the winners of the Swedish Speedway Team Championship for the first time. The Indianerna team included Henrik Gustafsson, Christer Rohlén, Lars Gunnestad, Simon Wigg and Stefan Dannö.

Eskilstuna and Karlstad merged for the 1990 season. Skepparna won the first division, while Masarna and Korparna won the second division north and south respectively.

Elitserien
Pos	Team	Pts
1	Indianerna	24
2	Örnarna	23
3	Vetlanda	17
4	Bysarna	14
5	Stockholm United	13
6	Rospiggarna	11
7	Smederna	6
8	Dackarna	4

Div 1
Pos	Team	Pts
1	Skepparna	20
2	Griparna	14
3	Vargarna	12
4	Valsarna	7
5	Eskilstuna/Karlstad	7
6	Kaparna	0

Div 2 north
Pos	Team	Pts
1	Masarna	23
2	Filbyterna	19
3	Gävle	8 12
4	Örebro	3
5	Eldarna	3

Div 2 south
Pos	Team	Pts
1	Korparna	23
2	Piraterna	17
3	Pilarna	5
4	Gnistorna	3

== See also ==
- Speedway in Sweden
