= 1998 Swedish speedway season =

Motorcycle racing competition

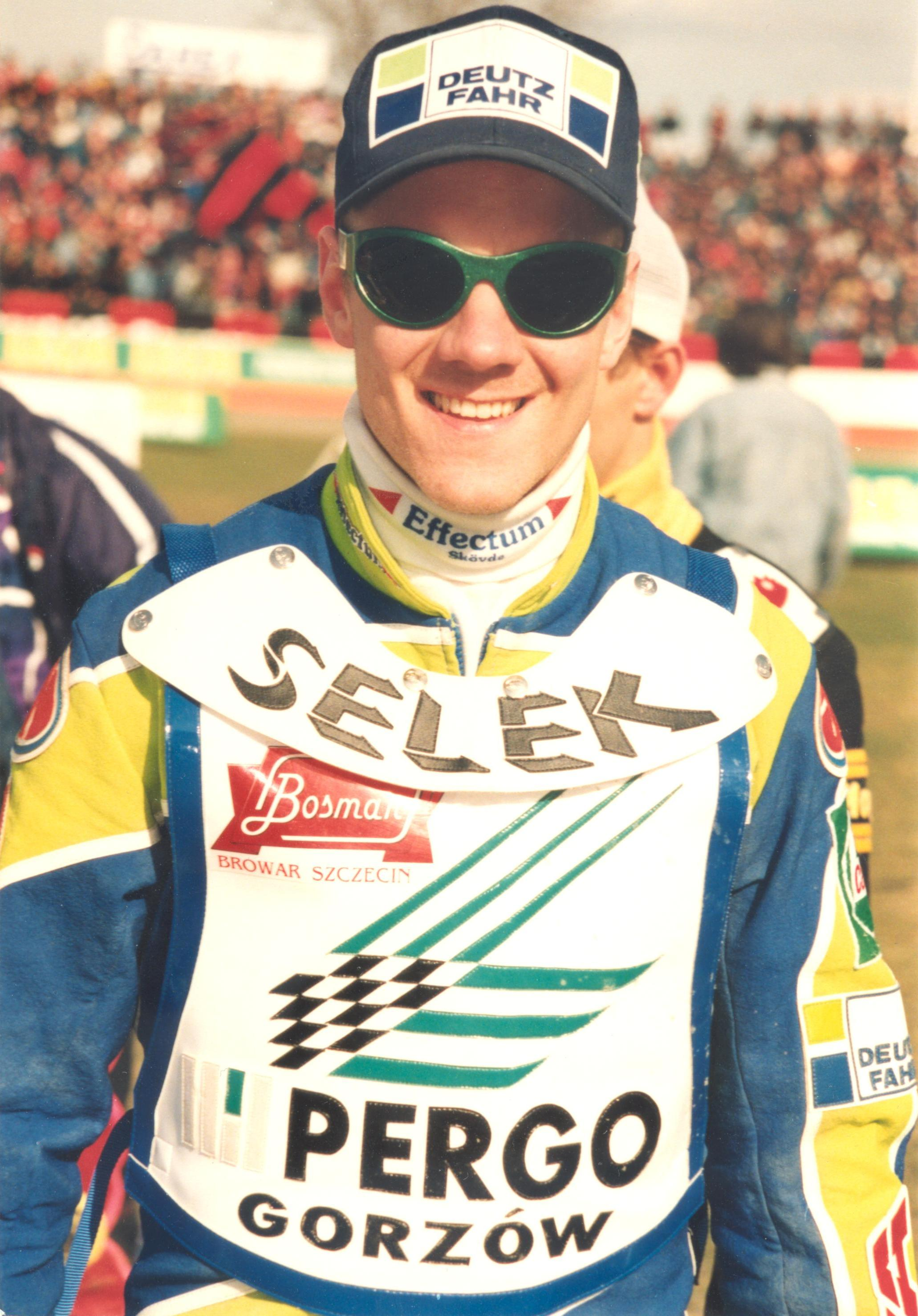
- Tony Rickardsson helped Valsarna win their first Elitserien title and became Swedish champion for the fourth time.

The 1998 Swedish speedway season was the 1998 season of motorcycle speedway in Sweden.

== Individual ==
=== Individual Championship ===
The 1998 Swedish Individual Speedway Championship final was held in Hagforson 16 August. Tony Rickardsson won the Swedish Championship for the fourth time.

Pos	Rider	Team	Pts	Total
1	Tony Rickardsson	Valsarna	(3,2,3,3,3)	14
2	Mikael Karlsson	Örnarna	(2,3,3,1,3)	12+3
3	Peter Karlsson	Kaparna	(3,1,3,3,2)	12+2
4	Andreas Jonsson	Rospiggarna	(2,3,2,2,2)	11
5	Henrik Gustafsson	Indianerna	(3,2,2,2,2)	11
6	Jimmy Nilsen	Rospiggarna	(1,3,3,0,3)	10
7	Stefan Dannö	Valsarna	(3,2,2,0,1)	8
8	Niklas Klingberg	Örnarna	(2,1,2,3,0)	8
9	Conny Ivarsson	Vetlanda	(u,3,0,3,1)	7
10	Niklas Karlsson	Vargarna	(1,0,1,2,3)	7
11	Patrick Dybeck	Indianerna	(0,2,1,1,2)	6
12	Claes Ivarsson	Vetlanda	(2,0,1,0,1)	4
13	Peter Ingvar Karlsson	Masarna	(1,1,0,2,0)	4
14	Einar Kyllingstad	Rospiggarna	(1,0,0,1,1)	3
15	Robert Eriksson (res)	Indianerna	(0,1,1,0)	2
16	Patrick Olsson	Västervik	(0,1,0,0,0)	1
17	Peter Nahlin	Vargarna	(-,-,-,-,-)	0

Key

- points per race - 3 for a heat win, 2 for 2nd, 1 for third, 0 for last
- +3 won race off, +2 2nd in race off, +1, 3rd in race off, +0 last in race off
- t - tape touching excluded
- u - fell
- w - excluded

=== U21 Championship ===
Andreas Jonsson won the U21 championship.

== Team ==
=== Team Championship ===
Valsarna won the Elitserien and were declared the winners of the Swedish Speedway Team Championship for the first time in their history. The Valsarna team included Tony Rickardsson, Stefan Dannö and Rune Holta.

Masarna won the first division and Team Viking won the second division.

Elitserien
Pos	Team	Pts
1	Valsarna	29
2	Rospiggarna	28
3	Indianerna	25
4	Vetlanda	23
5	Örnarna	18
6	Västervik	17
7	Vargarna	17
8	Smederna	8
9	Kaparna	8
10	Bysarna	7

Div 1
Pos	Team	Pts
1	Masarna	22
2	Team Svelux	21
3	Filbyterna	16
4	Karlstad	13
5	Getingarna	6
6	Korparna	4
7	Nässjö	2

Div 2
Pos	Team	Pts
1	Team Viking	22
2	Piraterna	18
3	Lejonen	14

== See also ==
- Speedway in Sweden
