= 2002 Swedish speedway season =

Motorcycle racing competition

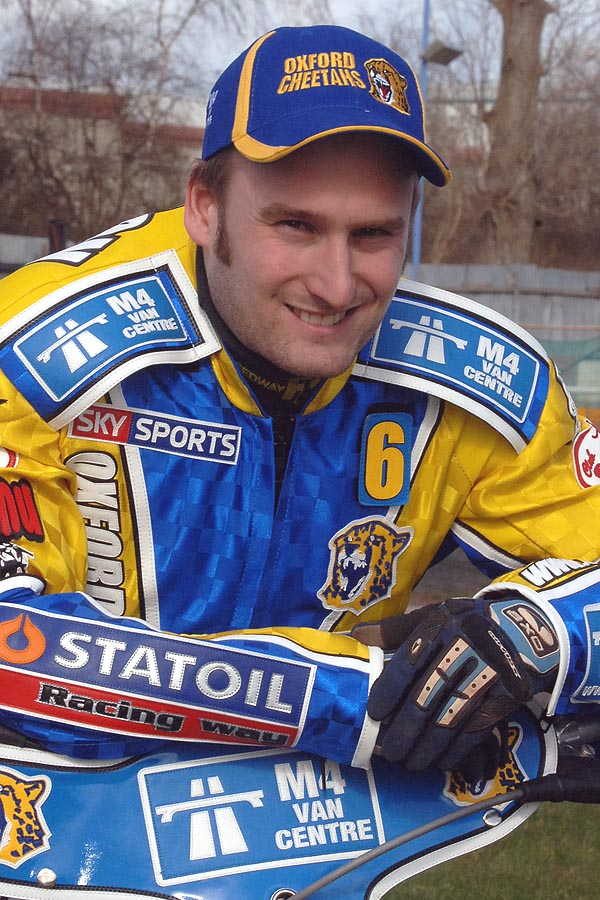
- Freddie Eriksson was the 2002 junior champion

The 2002 Swedish speedway season was the 2002 season of motorcycle speedway in Sweden.

== Individual ==
=== Individual Championship ===
The 2002 Swedish Individual Speedway Championship final was held at the Smedstadion in Eskilstuna on 17 August. Niklas Klingberg won the Swedish Championship.

Pos	Rider	team	Pts	Total
1	Niklas Klingberg	Masarna	(3,3,1,3,3)	13
2	Mikael Karlsson	Valsarna	(2,1,3,3,3)	12
3	Peter Karlsson	Kaparna	(3,2,1,3,2)	11
4	Freddie Eriksson	Rosppigarna	(3,3,0,1,3)	10
5	Tony Rickardsson	Masarna	(3,1,3,2,1)	10
6	Niklas Karlsson	Piraterna	(1,3,0,2,3)	9
7	Magnus Zetterström	Örnarna	(0,3,2,1,2)	8
8	Henrik Gustafsson	Indianerna	(1,2,2,2,0)	7
9	Peter Nahlin	Smederna	(2,0,3,0,1)	6
10	Antonio Lindbäck	Masarna	(1,2,0,3,0)	6
11	Peter I. Karlsson	Valsarna	(d,0,2,2,2)	6
12	Freddie Lindgren	Indianerna	(0,1,3,1,0)	5
13	Patrick Dybeck	Gasarna	(2,1,1,0,1)	5
14	Stefan Ekberg	Piraterna	(2,0,1,u,2)	5
15	Stefan Andersson	Luxo Stars	(0,2,2,0,-)	4
16	Kim Jansson (res)	Kaparna	(1)	1
17	Daniel Andersson	Smederna	(u,0,0,0,0)	0

Key

- points per race - 3 for a heat win, 2 for 2nd, 1 for third, 0 for last
- +3 won race off, +2 2nd in race off, +1, 3rd in race off, +0 last in race off
- ef - engine failure
- t - tape touching excluded
- u - fell
- w - excluded

=== U21 Championship ===
Freddie Eriksson won the U21 championship.

== Team ==
=== Team Championship ===
Rospiggarna won the Elitserien and were declared the winners of the Swedish Speedway Team Championship for the fourth time and for the second successive season. The Rospiggarna team included Greg Hancock, Ryan Sullivan and Andreas Jonsson.

Vetlanda won the Allsvenskan. Team Svelux became Luxo Stars and Team Viking became Vikingarna.

Elitserien
Pos	Team	Pts
1	Rospiggarna	37
2	Kaparna	31
3	Masarna	29
4	Västervik	27
5	Valsarna	24
6	Indianerna	21
7	Luxo Stars	20
8	Vargarna	20
9	Smederna	12
10	Örnarna	4

Allsvenskan
Pos	Team	Pts
1	Vetlanda	22
2	Piraterna	22
3	Lejonen	20
4	Gasarna	10
5	Bysarna	6

Play offs

Elitserien
Stage	Team	Team	Agg Score
SF	Kaparna	Masarna	105:87
Final	Rospiggarna	Kaparna	118:74

Division 1 east
Pos	Team	Pts
1	Vikingarna	14
2	Torshälla	12
3	Eldarna	10
4	Nässjö	2
5	Griparna	2

Division 1 west
Pos	Team	Pts
1	Kavaljererna	14
2	Gastarna	11
3	Norspeed	10
4	Karlstad	5
5	Korpana	0

Play offs

Division 1
Pos	Team	Pts
1	Vikingarna	7
2	Torshälla	7
3	Kavaljererna	7
4	Gastarna	4

== See also ==
- Speedway in Sweden
