= 2011 Swedish speedway season =

Motorcycle racing competition

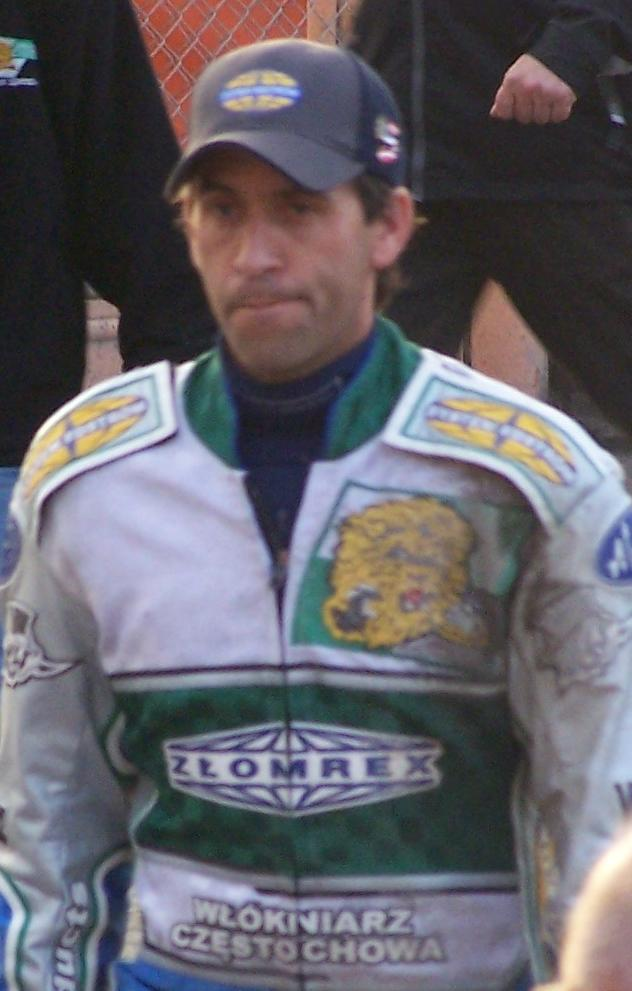
- Greg Hancock helped Piraterna win their first Elitserien

The 2011 Swedish speedway season was the 2011 season of motorcycle speedway in Sweden.

== Individual ==
=== Individual Championship ===
The 2011 Swedish Individual Speedway Championship final was held at the G&B Stadium in Målilla on 17 September. Andreas Jonsson won the Swedish Championship for the fifth time.

Pos	Rider	team	Pts	Total	SF	Final
1	Andreas Jonsson	Dackarna	(3,3,3,1,3)	13		3
2	Freddie Lindgren	Dackarna	(3,3,f,2,3)	11		2
3	Antonio Lindbäck	Indianerna	(t,3,3,2,2)	10	3	1
4	Jonas Davidsson	Piraterna	(3,3,2,3,1)	12		0
5	Thomas H. Jonasson	Vetlanda	(2,2,2,1,2)	9	2	
6	Peter Karlsson	Ornarna	(3,1,3,3,0)	10	1	
7	Linus Sundström	Piraterna	(2,1,3,0,3)	9	0	
8	Sebastian Aldén	Masarna	(1,2,1,3,f)	7		
9	Kim Nilsson	Rospiggarna	(2,0,1,3,0)	6		
10	Daniel Nermark	Valsarna	(2,2,2,r,0)	6		
11	Eric Andersson	Masarna	(0,1,2,2,1)	6		
12	Daniel Davidsson	Piraterna	(1,2,1,1,f)	5		
13	Mikael Max	Gnistorna	(1,2min,1,2,1)	5		
14	Anton Rosén	Masarna	(1,0,1,2,)	4		
15	Peter Ljung	Vastervik	(0.0,f,0.3)	3		
16	Ludvig Lindgren	Rospiggarna	(1,0,0,ef,2)	3		
17	Pontus Aspgren	Masarna	(f,-,-,-,-)	0		
18	David Ruud	Lejonen	(r)	0		

Key

- points per race - 3 for a heat win, 2 for 2nd, 1 for third, 0 for last
- ef - engine failure
- t - tape touching excluded
- f - fell
- r - retired
- 2min - warning excluded

=== U21 Championship ===
Simon Gustafsson won the U21 championship.

== Team ==
=== Team Championship ===
Piraterna won the Elitserien and were declared the winners of the Swedish Speedway Team Championship for the first time in their history.

Rospiggarna won the Allsvenskan.

Elitserien
Pos	Team	Pts
1	Indianerna	35
2	Piraterna	26
3	Hammarby	22
4	Vetlanda	21
5	Valsarna	20
6	Vargarna	15
7	Västervik	15
8	Dackarna	13
9	Lejonen	13

Allsvenskan
Pos	Team	Pts
1	Örnarna	16
2	Masarna	16
3	Rospiggarna	15
4	Smederna	12
5	Griparna	9
6	Gnistorna	9
7	Avantia	7

Play offs

Elitserien
Stage	Team	Team	Agg Score
SF	Indianerna	Hammarby	97:83
SF	Piraterna	Vetlanda	103:77
Final	Piraterna	Indianerna	93:87

Allsvenskan
Stage	Team	Team	Agg Score
SF	Masarna	Smederna	95:84
SF	Rospiggarna	Ornarna	97:82
Final	Rospiggarna	Smederna	98:82

Division 1
Pos	Team	Pts
1	Solkatterna	28
2	Malilla	19
3	Indianerna Juniors	16
4	Smederna Eskilstuna	13
5	Nassjo	12
6	Tigrarna	12
7	Pirates Motala	9
8	Rosgasarna Hallstavik	3
