= 1989 Swedish speedway season =

Motorcycle racing competition

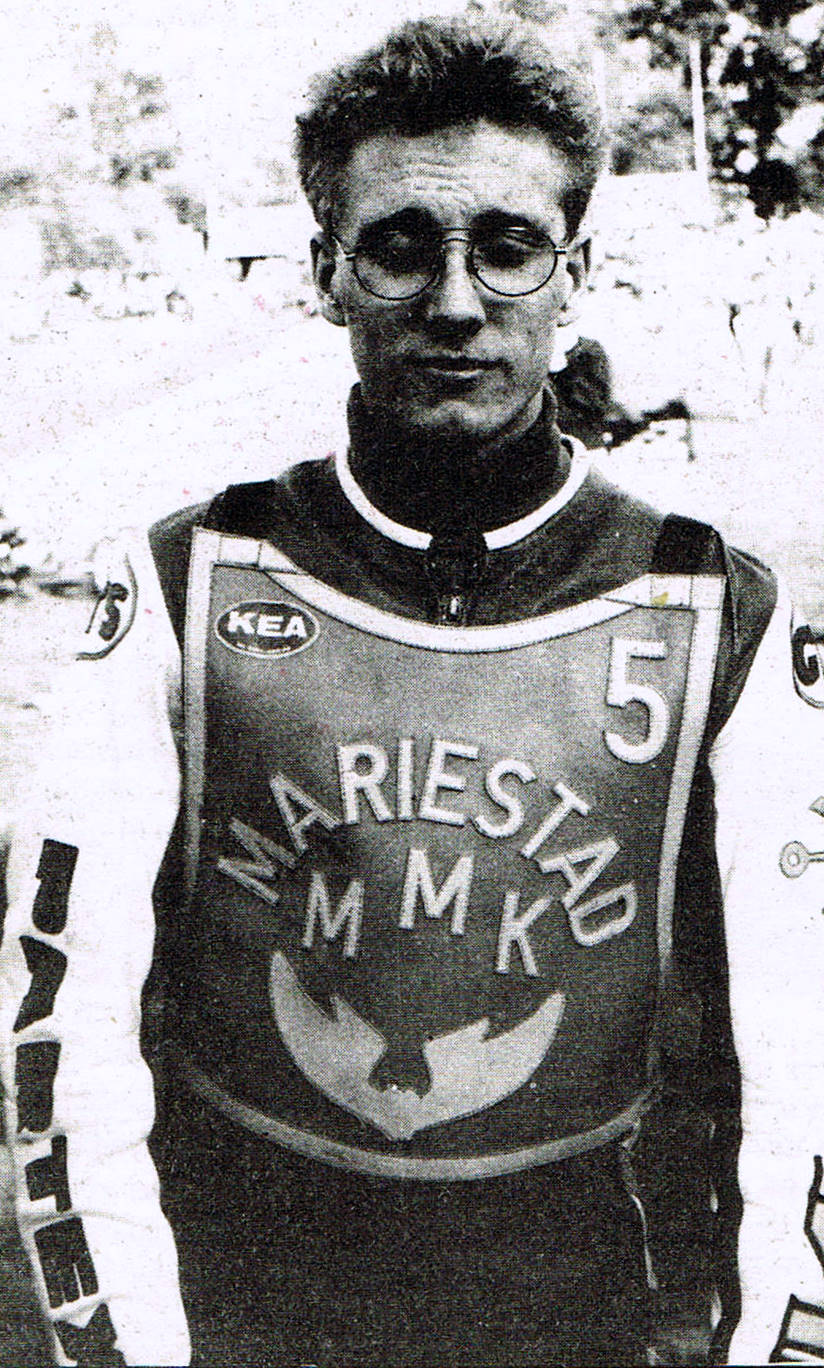
- Peter Karlsson became Swedish champion during 1989

The 1989 Swedish speedway season was the 1989 season of motorcycle speedway in Sweden.

== Individual ==
=== Individual Championship ===
The 1989 Swedish Individual Speedway Championship final was held at the Smedstadion in Eskilstuna on 23 September. Peter Karlsson won the Swedish Championship.

Pos	Rider	Team	Pts	Total
1	Peter Karlsson	Örnarna	(3,3,3,1,3)	13+3
2	Mikael Blixt	Indianerna	(3,3,2,3,2)	13+2
3	Per Jonsson	Stockholm U	(2,2,3,2,3)	12
4	Erik Stenlund	Stockholm U	(3,1,3,1,3)	11
5	Peter Nahlin	Smederna	(2,3,0,3,1)	9
6	Tony Rickardsson	Stockholm U	(1,0,1,3,3)	8
7	Claes Ivarsson	Vetlanda	(1,3,0,2,2)	8
8	Christer Rohlen	Indianerna	(2,1,2,3,0)	8
9	Jan Andersson	Vetlanda	(3,0,3,1,0)	7
10	Joakim Karlsson	Skepparna	(1,2,1,1,1)	6
11	Thomas Karlsson	Vargarna	(1,0,0,2,2)	5
12	Bo Arrhen	Stockholm U	(2,2,1,0,0)	5
13	Conny Ivarsson	Vetlanda	(0,2,2,0,1)	5
14	Dennis Löfqvist	Bysarna	(0,1,0,2,1)	4
15	Christer Johnson	Dackarna	(u,0,1,0,2)	3
16	Mikael Teurnberg	Rospiggarna	(0,1,2,0,0)	3

=== U21 Championship ===
Henrik Gustafsson won the U21 championship for the fourth consecutive year.

== Team ==
=== Team Championship ===
Stockholm United, (the merged Getingarna and Gamarna club) won the Elitserien and were declared the winners of the Swedish Speedway Team Championship. The Stockholm United team included Per Jonsson, Jimmy Nilsen, Erik Stenlund and Tony Rickardsson.

Smederna won the first division, while Valsarna and Kaparna won the second division north and south respectively.

Elitserien
Pos	Team	Pts
1	Stockholm United	23
2	Örnarna	19
3	Indianerna	18
4	Vetlanda	18
5	Bysarna	13
6	Dackarna	10
7	Rospiggarna	6
8	Vargarna	5

Div 1
Pos	Team	Pts
1	Smederna	28
2	Eskilstuna	20
3	Skepparna	18
4	Karlstad	16
5	Griparna	11
6	Lejonen	8
7	Filbyterna	8
8	Brassarna	3

Div 2 north
Pos	Team	Pts
1	Valsarna	24
2	Gävle	16
3	Örebro	8
4	Masarna	6
5	Eldarna	6

Div 2 south
Pos	Team	Pts
1	Kaparna	23
2	Korparna	19
3	Piraterna	11
4	Gnistorna	6
5	Pilarna	1

== See also ==
- Speedway in Sweden
