= List of speedway teams in Sweden =

This is a list of speedway teams in Sweden.

== Leagues ==
- Elitserien
- Allsvenskan
- Division 1

== Alphabetically ==
=== B ===
- Bajen Speedway
- Bysarna

=== D ===
- Dackarna

=== E ===
- Eldarna

=== F ===
- Filbyterna

=== G ===
- Gamarna
- Getingarna
- Gnistorna
- Griparna
- SMK Gävle

=== I ===
- Hammarby Speedway

=== I ===
- Indianerna

=== J ===
- Jämtarna

=== K ===
- Kaparna

=== L ===
- Lejonen
- Lindarna

=== M ===
- Masarna

=== N ===
- Nässjö SK

=== Ö ===
- Örnarna

=== P ===
- Piraterna

=== R ===
- Rospiggarna

=== S ===
- Smålänningarna
- Smederna
- Solkatterna
- Speedway 054

=== T ===
- Team Bikab
- Team Canvac
- Team Dalakraft
- Team Dalej
- Team Kumla Pro

=== V ===
- Valsarna
- Vargarna
- Vetlanda Speedway
- Vikingarna Speedway
- Västervik Speedway
