= 1970 Swedish speedway season =

Motorcycle racing competition

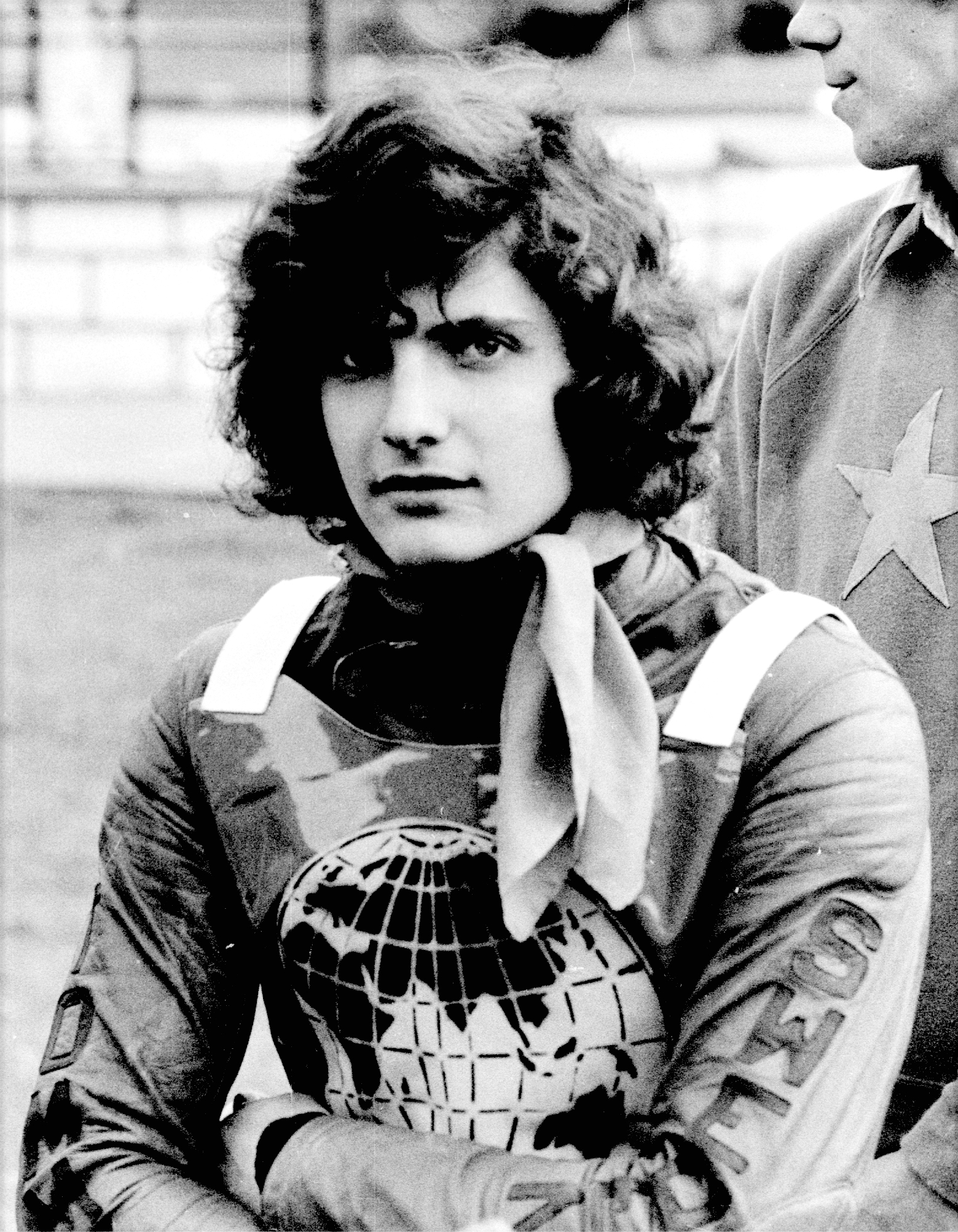
- Tommy Jansson was the Junior champion

The 1970 Swedish speedway season was the 1970 season of motorcycle speedway in Sweden.

== Individual ==
=== Individual Championship ===
The 1970 Swedish Individual Speedway Championship final was held on 26 September in Stockholm. Ove Fundin won the Swedish Championship for the ninth time.

Pos.	Rider	Club	Total
1	Ove Fundin	Kaparna	14+3
2	Bernt Persson	Indianerna	14+2
3	Anders Michanek	Getingarna	13
4	Leif Enecrona	Getingarna	12
5	Göte Nordin	Kaparna	11
6	Hans Holmqvist	Masarna	10
7	Christer Löfqvist	Bysarna	8
8	Tommy Johansson	Dackarna	8
9	Per-Olof Söderman	Vargarna	6
10	Jan Simensen	Lejonen	6
11	Therje Henriksson	Lejonen	6
12	Per-Åke Gerhardsson	Vargarna	5
13	Ragnar Holm	Filbyterna	3
14	Bengt Larsson	Örnarna	3
15	Åke Andersson	Lejonen	1
16	Bengt Brannefors	Kaparna	0
17	Torbjörn Karlsson (res)	Bysarna	0
18	Claes Löfstrand (res)	Kaparna	0

=== Junior Championship ===
Winner - Tommy Jansson

== Team ==
=== Team Championship ===
Kaparna won division 1 and were declared the winners of the Swedish Speedway Team Championship for the second time. The team included Ove Fundin, Göte Nordin and Bengt Jansson

Bysarna won the second division, while Filbyterna and Vikingarna won the third division east and west respectively.

Div 1
Pos	Team	Pts
1	Kaparna	21
2	Getingarna	16
3	Njudungarna	13
4	Vargarna	12
5	Lejonen	12
6	Örnarna	6
7	Indianerna	4

Div 2
Pos	Team	Pts
1	Bysarna	17
2	Masarna	16
3	Dackarna	16
4	Smederna	10
5	Taxarna	1

Div 3 east
Pos	Team	Pts
1	Filbyterna	20
2	Skepparna	10.5
3	Gamarna	10.5
4	Eldarna	7

Div 3 west
Pos	Team	Pts
1	Vikingarna	23
2	Lindarna	16
3	Valsarna	12.5
4	Solkatterna	7.5
5	Jämtarna	0

== See also ==
- Speedway in Sweden
