= Robert Eriksson (speedway rider) =

Swedish speedway rider (born 1974)

- Born: 23 February 1974 (age 52); Örebro, Sweden
- Nationality: Swedish

Career history

Sweden
- 1991, 2002: Vikingarna
- 1992–1996, 2006–2009: Valsarna
- 1997–2001: Indianerna
- 2003, 2005: Bysarna
- 2004: Solkatterna

Great Britain
- 1995–1997, 2000–2001: Edinburgh Monarchs
- 1998: Belle Vue Aces
- 1999: Newcastle Diamonds

Individual honours
- 1995: Swedish U21 Champion

Team honours
- 2002: Division One (East) Winner

Robert Karl Eriksson (born 23 February 1974) is a former motorcycle speedway rider from Sweden.

== Career ==
Eriksson started his career riding for Buddys during the 1991 Swedish speedway season but switched to Valsarna the following year and would spend five seasons with them.

During the 1995 Swedish speedway season, Eriksson became the Swedish U21 Champion.

Eriksson's first British league experience came during the 1995 Premier League speedway season, when he rode for Edinburgh Monarchs. He spent three seasons with the Scottish club (one of them when the team was renamed the Scottish Monarchs).

Eriksson rode for Indianerna from 1997 to 2001 and had a season riding for Belle Vue Aces and Newcastle Diamonds in Britain before returning to Edinburgh.

Eriksson rejoined Valsarna in 2006 and rode for them until his retirement at the end of the 2009 season.
