= 1967 Swedish speedway season =

Motorcycle racing competition

The 1967 Swedish speedway season was the 1967 season of motorcycle speedway in Sweden.

== Individual ==
=== Individual Championship ===
The final of the 1967 Swedish Individual Speedway Championship took place on 10 October in Gothenburg. Ove Fundin emerged victorious, claiming the Swedish Championship for the seventh time.

Pos.	Rider	Club	Total
1	Ove Fundin	Kaparna	14
2	Bo Josefsson	Njudungarna	13
3	Torbjörn Harrysson	Vargarna	12+3
4	Bengt Brannefors	Kaparna	12+2
5	Leif Enecrona	Getingarna	11
6	Bengt Jansson	Getingarna	10
7	Hans Holmqvist	Taxarna	9
8	Bengt Larsson	Örnarna	7
9	Bernt Persson	Smederna	6
10	Anders Michanek	Getingarna	6
11	Therje Henriksson	Lejonen	5
12	Per-Olof Söderman	Vargarna	5
13	Olle Nygren	Vargarna	3
14	Tommy Bergqvist	Taxarna	3
15	Conny Samuelsson	Njudungarna	2
16	Willy Friberg	Lejonen	1

=== Junior Championship ===
Winner - Christer Löfqvist

== Team ==
=== Team Championship ===
In the team events, Getingarna continued their dominance by winning Division 1 for the fifth consecutive season, thus being declared the winners of the Swedish Speedway Team Championship. Despite Arne Carlsson retiring and losing Leif Larsson for the season the Getingarna team recruited well by gaining Anders Michanek and Leif Enecrona to support Göte Nordin and Bengt Jansson.

The 1967 season saw the return of four divisions, with Dackarna rejoining after missing the 1966 season, along with three other clubs: Bysarna, Vikingarna and Solkatterna.

Indianerna won the second division, while Dackarna and Smederna won the third division east and west titles, respectively.

Div 1
Pos	Team	Pts
1	Getingarna	19
2	Njudungarna	14
3	Vargarna	11.5
4	Kaparna	8
5	Örnarna	7.5

Div 2
Pos	Team	Pts
1	Indianerna	19
2	Lejonen	15
3	Taxarna	14
4	Masarna	7

Div 3 E
Pos	Team	Pts
1	Dackarna	21
2	Bysarna	13
3	Filbyterna	12
4	Skepparna	2

Div 3 W
Pos	Team	Pts
1	Smederna	22
2	Stjärnorna	18
3	Vikingarna	8
4	Solkatterna	0

== See also ==
- Speedway in Sweden
