= Tallhult Motorstadion =

Stadium in Hagfors, Sweden

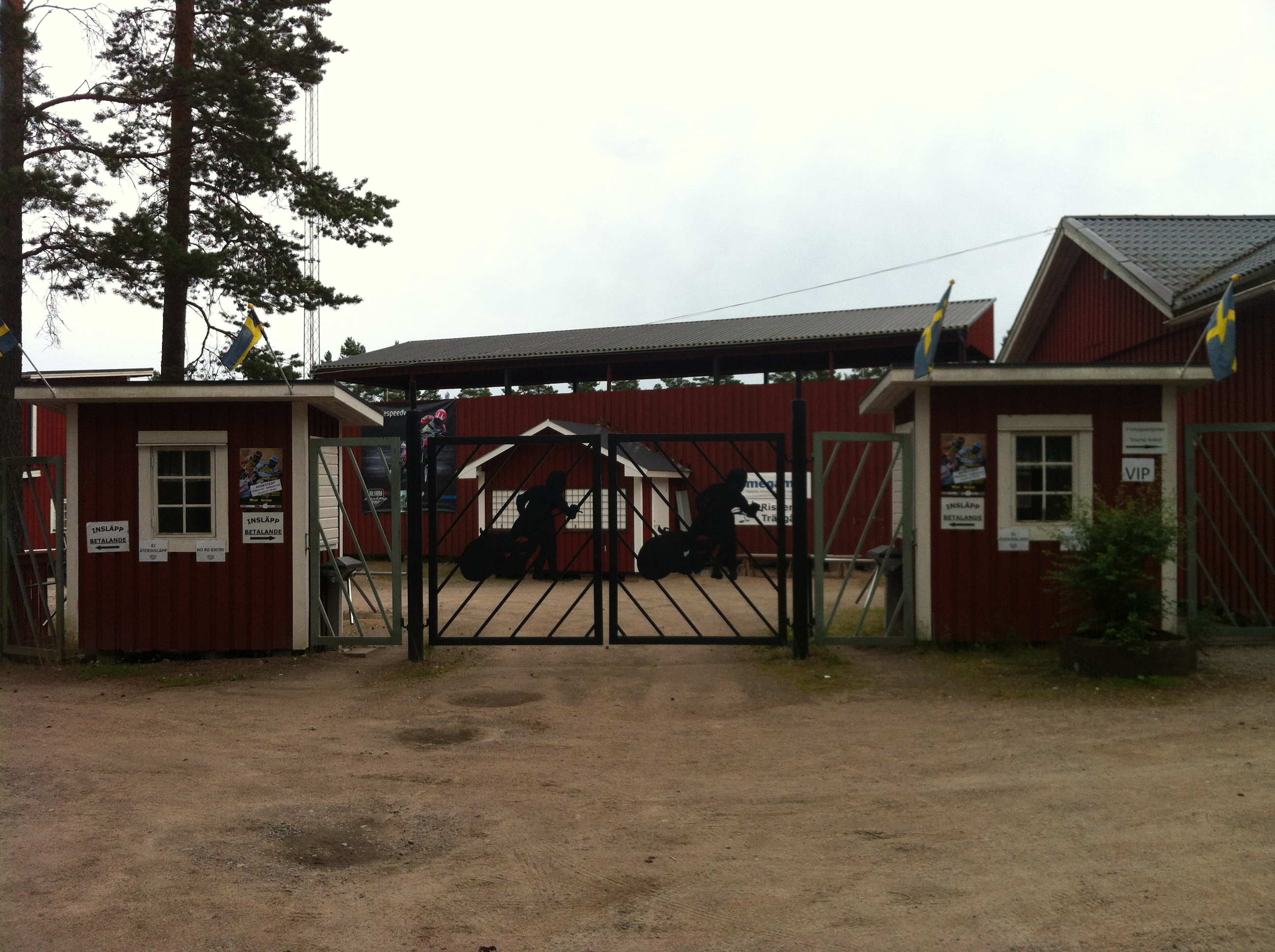
- Location: 683 91 Hagfors, Sweden
- Coordinates: 60°03′34″N 13°42′57″E
- Capacity: 6,000
- Operator: Valsarna motorcycle speedway
- Opened: 1969
- Length: 290 m (0.18 mi)

Tallhult Motorstadion is a 6,000 capacity motorcycle speedway track located about 3 kilometres north of Hagfors. The track is on road 245 to Geijersholm and is surrounded by forest.

The stadium hosts the speedway team Valsarna that compete in the Swedish Speedway Team Championship. The speedway team have been champions of Sweden two times.

== History ==
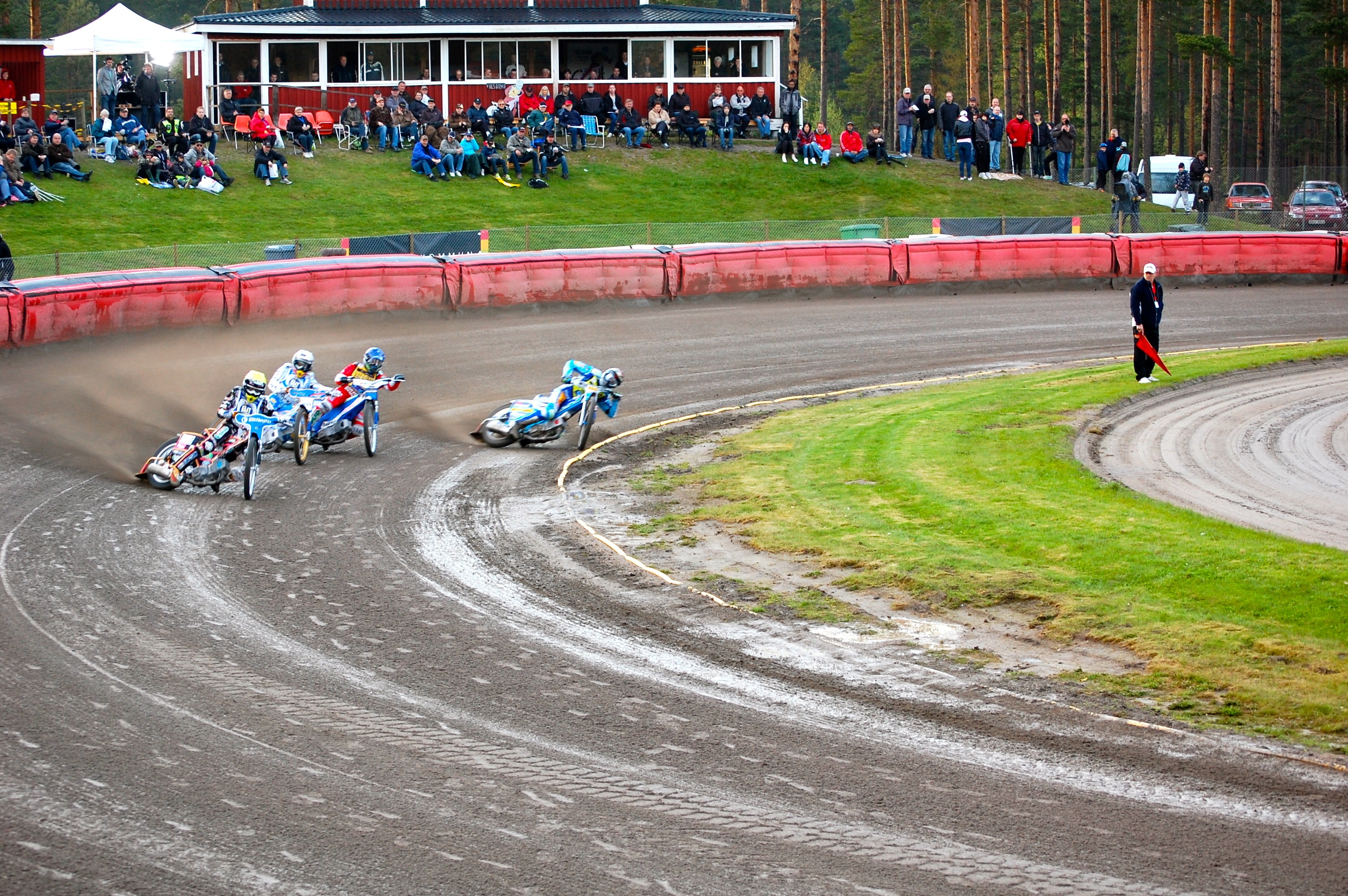
Elitserien match at the Tallhult Motorstadion, Valsarna vs Vetlanda, 15 May 2012

The stadium has hosted the final of the Swedish Individual Speedway Championship in 1998 and 2003.

In 2013, Hagfors entrepreneur Kjell Ottosson bought the stadium and adjacent motocross track, following the bankruptcy of the speedway club and rented them out to both the speedway and motocross clubs. He put the stadium up for sale in 2017 and again in 2020.

Valsarna have a lease that runs until 2024.

== Track records ==
- Mikael Karlsson, 53.8 seconds, 9 May 2000
