= 1952 Swedish speedway season =

Motorcycle racing competition

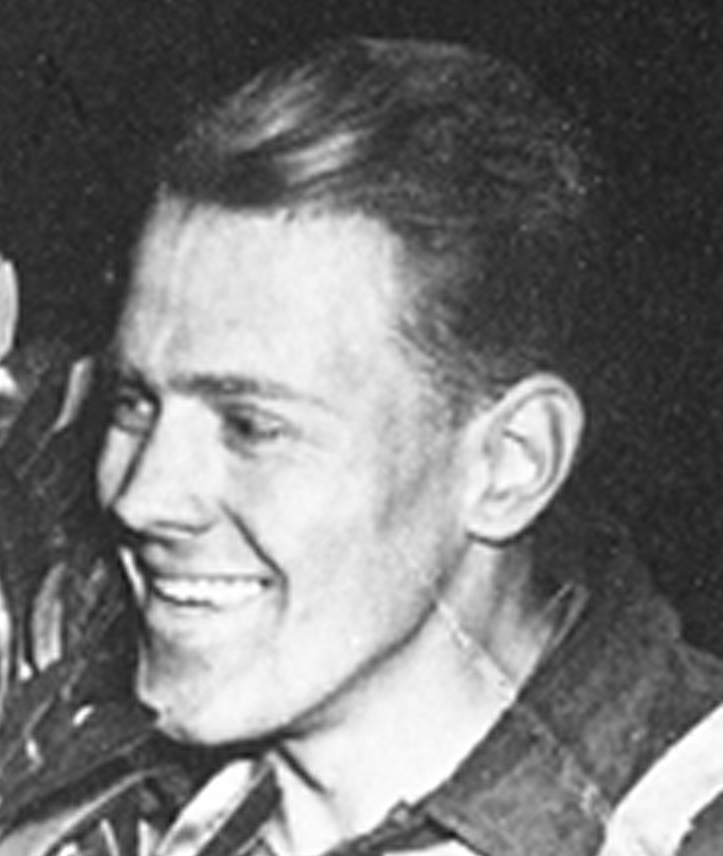
- Sune Karlsson; Swedish Championship runner-up and helped Getingarna win the league title

The 1952 Swedish speedway season was the 1952 season of motorcycle speedway in Sweden.

== Individual ==
=== Individual Championship ===
The 1952 Swedish Individual Speedway Championship final was held on 24 October in Stockholm. Göte Olsson won the Swedish Championship.

| Pos. | Rider | Club | Pts |
|---|---|---|---|
| 1 | Göte Olsson | Indianerna | 14+3 |
| 2 | Sune Karlsson | Getingarna | 14+2 |
| 3 | Bert Lindarw | Smederna | 13 |
| 4 | Olle Nygren | Vargarna | 12 |
| 5 | Stig Pramberg | Vargarna | 11 |
| 6 | Bengt Nilsson | Kaparna | 9 |
| 7 | Joel Jansson | Smederna | 8 |
| 8 | Rune Sörmander | Dackarna | 7 |
| 9 | Einar Lindqvist | Vargarna | 7 |
| 10 | Bo Andersson | Getingarna | 6 |
| 11 | Åke Lindqvist | Getingarna | 5 |
| 12 | Ove Fundin | Filbyterna | 4 |
| 13 | Kjell Carlsson | Kaparna | 4 |
| 14 | Bernt Nilsson | Monarkerna | 3 |
| 15 | Georg Duneborn | Getingarna | 2 |
| 16 | Gösta Zanderholm | Filbyterna | 0 |

== Team ==
=== Team Championship ===
Getingarna won division 1 and were declared the winners of the Swedish Speedway Team Championship.

Monarkerna won division 2.

There were three name changes for the 1952 season. The first was a merger between Saxarna from Borås and Falkarna from Falköping to form a new team called Knallarna. The other two changes saw Hyllingarna become Stenbockarna and Solkatterna became Kavaljererna.

Div 1
| Pos | Team | Pts |
|---|---|---|
| 1 | Getingarna | 23 |
| 2 | Smederna | 21 |
| 3 | Indianerna | 18 |
| 4 | Vargarna | 16 |
| 5 | Filbyterna | 14 |
| 6 | Kaparna | 10 |
| 7 | Dackarna | 10 |
| 8 | Vikingarna | 0 |

Div 2
| Pos | Team | Pts |
|---|---|---|
| 1 | Monarkerna | 20 |
| 2 | Knallarna | 12 |
| 3 | Kuggarna | 11 |
| 4 | Stenbockarna | 8 |
| 5 | Garvarna | 7 |
| 6 | Kavaljererna | 2 |

== See also ==
- Speedway in Sweden
