= 1988 Speedway Under-21 World Championship =

European motorcycle speedway event

World Under-21 Championship
- Venue: Slaný Speedway Stadium
- Location: Slaný, Czechoslovakia
- Start date: 10 July 1988

The 1988 Individual Speedway Junior World Championship was the 12th edition of the World motorcycle speedway Under-21 Championships. It was the first Championship open to all nations, which was why it was renamed the World Under-21 Championship from the European Under-21 Championship.

The event was won by Peter Nahlin of Sweden.

== World final ==
- 10 July 1988
- (Czechoslovakia) Slaný Speedway Stadium, Slaný

Placing	Rider	Total	1	2	3	4	5	6	7	8	9	10	11	12	13	14	15	16	17	18	19	20	Pts	Pos	21
1	(Sweden) (7) Peter Nahlin	14		3					3					2	3					3			14	1	
2	(Sweden) (16) Henrik Gustafsson	11				3				2	3						2			1			11	2	3
3	(Denmark) (11) Brian Karger	11			2				2		2					2						3	11	3	2
4	(Denmark) (10) Kenneth Arnfred	11			1			2						3			3		2				11	4	1
5	(Sweden) (1) Christer Rohlén	10	3				3				E				1				3				10	5	
6	(Sweden) (3) Niklas Karlsson	10	2						1				3				1				3		10	6	
7	(West Germany) (9) Tommy Dunker	9			3		E						1					3		2			9	7	
8	(Poland) (4) Piotr Świst	9	1							3				1				2				2	9	8	
9	(Australia) (2) Troy Butler	8	0					3				2				3				0			8	9	
10	(Poland) (12) Waldemar Cieślewicz	8			0					1		3			2						2		8	10	
11	(Soviet Union) (8) Ruslan Koval	6		2						0			2			1			1				6	11	
12	(Poland) (5) Zbigniew Błażejczak	4		1			2					1					0					0	4	12	
13	(Czechoslovakia) (13) Jan Schinagl	3				2	1							0		0					0		3	13	
14	(Poland) (14) Sławomir Dudek	3				1		1					0		0							1	3	x	
15	(Poland) (6) Jarosław Olszewski	3		0				0			1							1			1		3	15	
16	(Czechoslovakia) (15) Vladimir Kalina	0				0			0			0						F	0				0	16	
R1	(Hungary) (R1) Róbert Nagy	0																					0	R1	
Placing	Rider	Total	1	2	3	4	5	6	7	8	9	10	11	12	13	14	15	16	17	18	19	20	Pts	Pos	21

m - exclusion for exceeding two minute time allowance • t - exclusion for touching the tapes • x - other exclusion • e - retired or mechanical failure • f - fell • ns - non-starter • nc - non-classify

gate A - inside	gate B	gate C	gate D - outside
