= Roland Dannö =

Swedish speedway rider

- Born: 13 February 1966 (age 60); Östersund, Sweden
- Nationality: Swedish

Career history

Sweden
- 1984-1988: Indianerna

Great Britain
- 1987: Hackney Hawks
- 1988: Belle Vue Aces

Individual honours
- 1988: Swedish Championship silver

Roland Dannö (born 13 February 1966) is a former international speedway rider from Sweden. He earned ten caps for the Sweden national speedway team.

== Speedway career ==
Dannö won the silver medal at the 1988 Swedish Championship.

Dannö rode in the top tier of British Speedway from 1987 to 1988, riding for Hackney Hawks and Belle Vue Aces.

== Family ==
Dannö's brother Stefan was also a speedway rider.
