= Mikael Max =

Swedish speedway rider

Mikael Max Mikael Karlsson
- Born: 21 August 1973 (age 53); Gullspång, Sweden
- Nationality: Swedish
- Website: mikaelmax.com

Career history

Sweden
- 1989–1998: Örnarna
- 1999–2002: Valsarna
- 2003–2005, 2015–2016: Luxo Stars/Dackarna
- 2006–2008: Piraterna
- 2006–2015: Gnistorna
- 2010–2011: Lejonen
- 2013: Hammarby
- 2014: Indianerna

Great Britain
- 1993–1994, 1996–1999, 2001–2005: Wolverhampton Wolves
- 2006: Arena Essex Hammers

Poland
- 1995: Piła
- 2000–2002: Rybnik
- 2003: Warsaw
- 2005 2009–2010: Rzeszów
- 2006–2007: Ostrów
- 2008: Wrocław
- 2011: Gdańsk
- 2012: Daugavpils

Individual honours
- 1994: World Under-21 Champion
- 1992: Swedish U21 champion

Team honours
- 1994, 2000, 2003, 2004: Speedway World Cup
- 1996: Premier League
- 1996: Elite League KO Cup Winner
- 1997: Premiership Winner
- 2002: Elite League
- 2005: Polish Div Two Champion
- 1992, 1993, 1994, 1996, 1999: Swedish Elitserien Champion
- 1992, 1996, 2002, 2003: Swedish Pairs Champion

Karl Mikael Karlsson (born 21 August 1973), who later rode under the name Mikael Max, is a Swedish former international motorcycle speedway rider. He earned 21 caps for the Sweden national speedway team.

== Career ==
After first riding a speedway bike at the age of twelve, Max moved up to 500cc bikes in 1989. He represented Sweden at under-21 level in 1990, and made his full debut for Sweden in 1991.

Max won the Swedish U21 championship in 1992 and finished runner-up to Joe Screen in the World Under-21 Championship in 1993. He made amends the following season by winning the championship in 1994.

Max made his British speedway debut in 1993 for Wolverhampton Wolves, going on to ride for the club until 2005, only missing the 1995 and 2000 seasons. In 2006, he rode for the Arena Essex Hammers. Max is his mother's maiden name and he raced as Mikael Max from 2003.

Max won four World team championships in 1994, 2000, 2003 and 2004.

Max's two brothers, Peter Karlsson and Magnus Karlsson, are both speedway riders. All three brothers represented Sweden in the 2007 Speedway World Cup, with Magnus riding at reserve. He won the Swedish Pairs Championship four times, twice with brother Peter, in 1992 and 1996, with Stefan Dannö in 2002 and with Stefan Andersson in 2003.

== World Championship ==
=== Speedway Grand Prix results ===
Year	Position	Points	Best Finish	Notes
1995	16th	17	15th	
1996	23rd	0	-	Reserve in Swedish Grand Prix (did not ride)
1997	16th	14	8th	8th in Great Britain Grand Prix. Reserve in three others.
1999	14th	45	9th	
2000	13th	39	7th	
2001	7th	59	2nd	2nd in Sweden Grand Prix. 3rd in Poland Grand Prix.
2002	5th	122	3rd	3rd in Norway Grand Prix. 3rd in Great Britain Grand Prix.
2003	13th	52	5th	
2004	16th	49	9th	
2005	28th	0	17th	Reserve at Sweden Grand Prix

== See also ==
- Sweden national speedway team
- List of Speedway Grand Prix riders
