= Stefan Dannö =

Swedish speedway rider

- Born: 10 February 1969 (age 57); Östersund, Sweden
- Nationality: Swedish

Career history

Sweden
- 1988–1993, 2004: Indianerna
- 1994–2003: Valsarna
- 2001: Karlstad
- 2006: Hammarby

Great Britain
- 1992–1998, 2000: Eastbourne Eagles

Team honours
- 1995: Premier League winners
- 1990, 1991, 1998, 1999: Elitserien champion

Stefan Kjell Dannö (born 10 February 1969) is a Swedish former international speedway rider who rode in the Speedway World Championship. He earned five caps for the Sweden national speedway team.

== Career ==
Dannö rode for the Eastbourne Eagles in the British Speedway League and Indianerna in the Swedish Elite League when they were champions in 1990 and 1991. He was Swedish Champion in 2003.

== Family ==
Dannö's brother Roland was also a speedway rider.

== Speedway Grand Prix results ==
Year	Position	Points	Best Finish	Notes
1998	13th	49	6th	
1999	11th	52	3rd	
2000	12th	41	3rd	only 5 events

== World Longtrack Championship ==
=== One Day Finals ===
- 1991 (Czech Republic) Marianske Lazne (6th) 12pts
- 1992 (Germany) Pfarrkirchen (10th) 9pts
- 1993 (Germany) Muhldorf (10th) 9pts
- 1995 (Germany) Scheessel (16th) 3pts

== World Team Cup ==
=== World final ===
- 1996 - (Germany) Hofheim, Hesse (with Daniel Andersson / Niklas Klingberg) - 5th - 14pts

== See also ==
- Sweden national speedway team
- List of Speedway Grand Prix riders
- List of Speedway Long Track World Championship riders
