= Vikingarna (speedway) =

Swedish speedway team

Club information
- Track address: Örebro Motorstadion; Örebro, Örebro County
- Country: Sweden
- Founded: 1950

Club facts
- Track size: 289 metres

Major team honours
second tier winners	1951, 1953
third tier winners	1970, 1977, 1994, 1998

Vikingarna (lit. 'the Vikings') are a Swedish motorcycle speedway team based at the Örebro Motorstadion, 9 km west of Örebro, near Örebro Airport in Sweden.

== History ==
=== 1950 to 1954 ===
The beginning of competitive league speedway in Örebro can be traced back to the 1950 Swedish speedway season. A club called Vikingarna racing at the Örebro Motorstadion in Adolfsberg finished last out of four teams in the second division. However, the following season in 1951, was much improved to the degree that the team actually won the six team division.

The team competed in the highest tier for the first time during the 1952 Swedish speedway season (called division 1 at the time) but struggled in the division and were eventually relegated. A young Göte Nordin rode for the club from 1952 to 1954 and he helped them win division 2 again in 1953. They returned to division 1 again for the 1954 Swedish speedway season but once again finished last. Swedish league participation suffered during the following years and Vikingarna were just one of several teams that failed to enter a team.

=== 1961 to 1981 ===
The team returned for the 1961 Swedish speedway season but once again dropped out afterwards, missing the 1962 to 1966 seasons. They were one of several teams that returned in 1967 for the newly created four division league system, they were placed in division 3 west. At some stage during the latter part of the 1960s, the team moved from the Adolfsberg Motorstadion to a track at the Trängens IP.

During the 1970s, they twice won division 3 in 1970 and 1977. In between (in 1975), work started on a new Örebro Motorstadion, also known as the Täby Motorstadion (the current venue); the site would offer speedway, motocross and karting. The name Täby relates to the nearby village parish and not the city.

=== 1982 to 1986 ===
The club remained in the third tier, which became known as the Division 2 because of the introduction of the Elitserien in 1982. Two years later in 1984, they won division 2 but Örebro found itself without speedway once again from 1987 to 1988.

=== 1989 to 2001 ===
Racing returned to Örebro in the 1989, with the team taking the city's name Örebro. However, in 1991, they were renamed Buddys and this was followed by another name change in 1994, to Team Viking. In 1994, Team Viking won division 2, a feat they emulated in 1998, despite finishing last in 1996.

=== 2002 to present ===
During the 2002 Swedish speedway season, the team reverted to their traditional name Vikingarna and won division 1 east (which was now the third tier). Riding for them that season was Freddie Lindgren and Robert Eriksson.

As of 2023 the team continued to ride in the third tier (division 1).

== 2023 team ==
- Ludvig Lindgren
- Eric Persson
- Benny Johansson
- Sebastian Glimfjäll Johansson
- Adrian George
- Patrick Hamburg

== Notable riders ==
- (Sweden) Freddie Lindgren
- (Sweden) Göte Nordin
