= Valsarna =

Swedish motorcycle speedway team

Club information
- Track address: Tallhult Motorstadion; Tallhult, Hagfors, Sweden
- Country: Sweden
- Founded: 1967
- League: Allsvenskan
- Website: Official website

Club facts
- Nickname: The Waltzes / Rollers
- Track size: 290 metres
- Track record time: 52.4
- Track record date: 2008
- Track record holder: Victor Palovaara

Major team honours
Team champions	1998, 1999
Allsvenskan champions	1993, 2009, 2002
Third tier champions	1971, 1986, 1989

Valsarna is a motorcycle speedway club from Tallhult, Hagfors in Sweden, who compete in the Swedish Speedway Team Championship. Their home track is at the Tallhult Motorstadion which is located to the North of Hagfors on the road to Geijersholm. They are twice league champions of Sweden.

== History ==
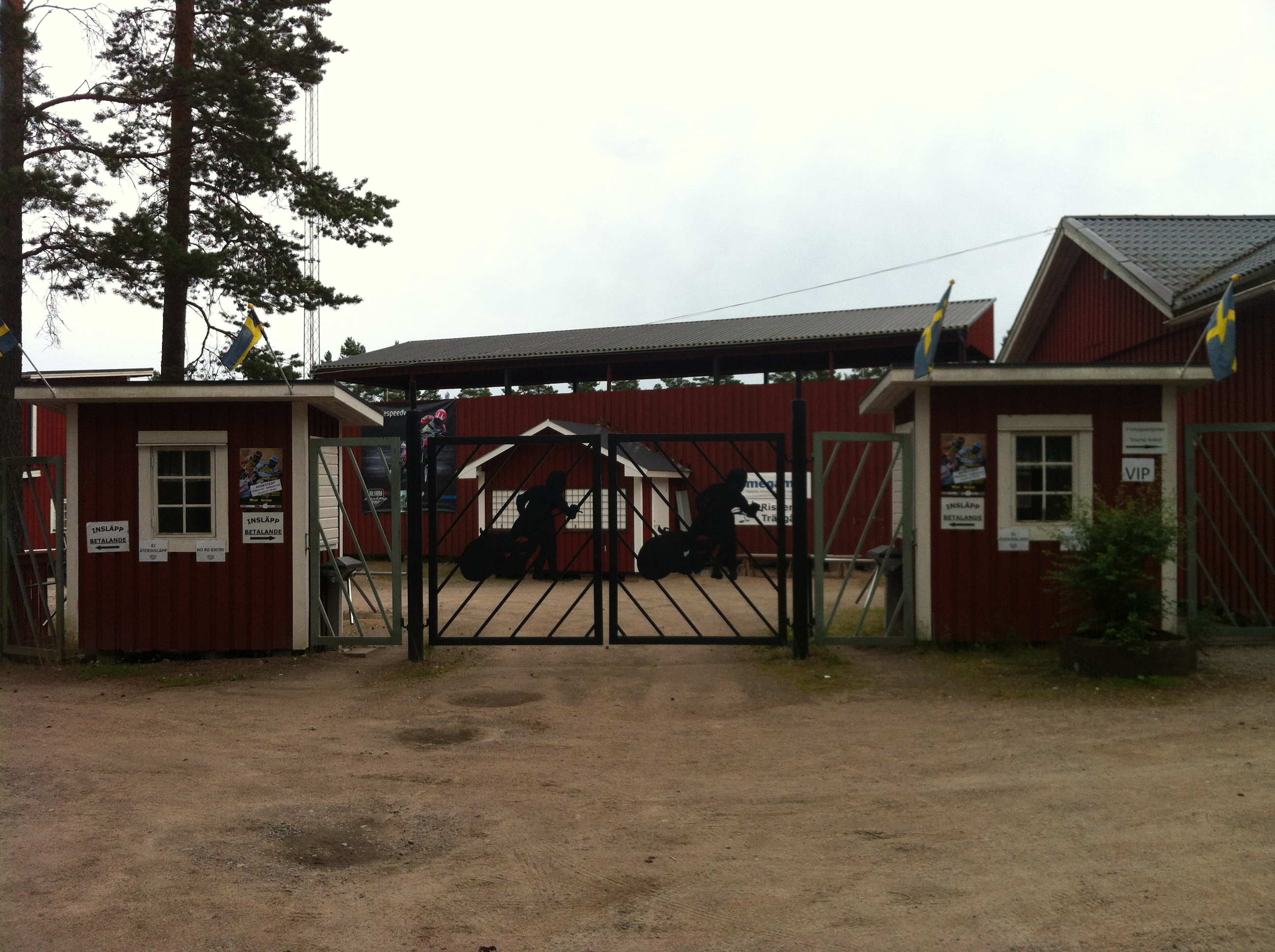
Tallhult Motorstadion in 2012

=== 1967–1976 ===
Valsarna Speedway Club was founded on 11 October 1967. They first participated in the Swedish leagues during the 1970 Swedish speedway season, competing in division 3 west, and they won their first honours the following season in 1971, after winning the same division. After four years in division 2, they dropped out for the league.

=== 1981–1993 ===
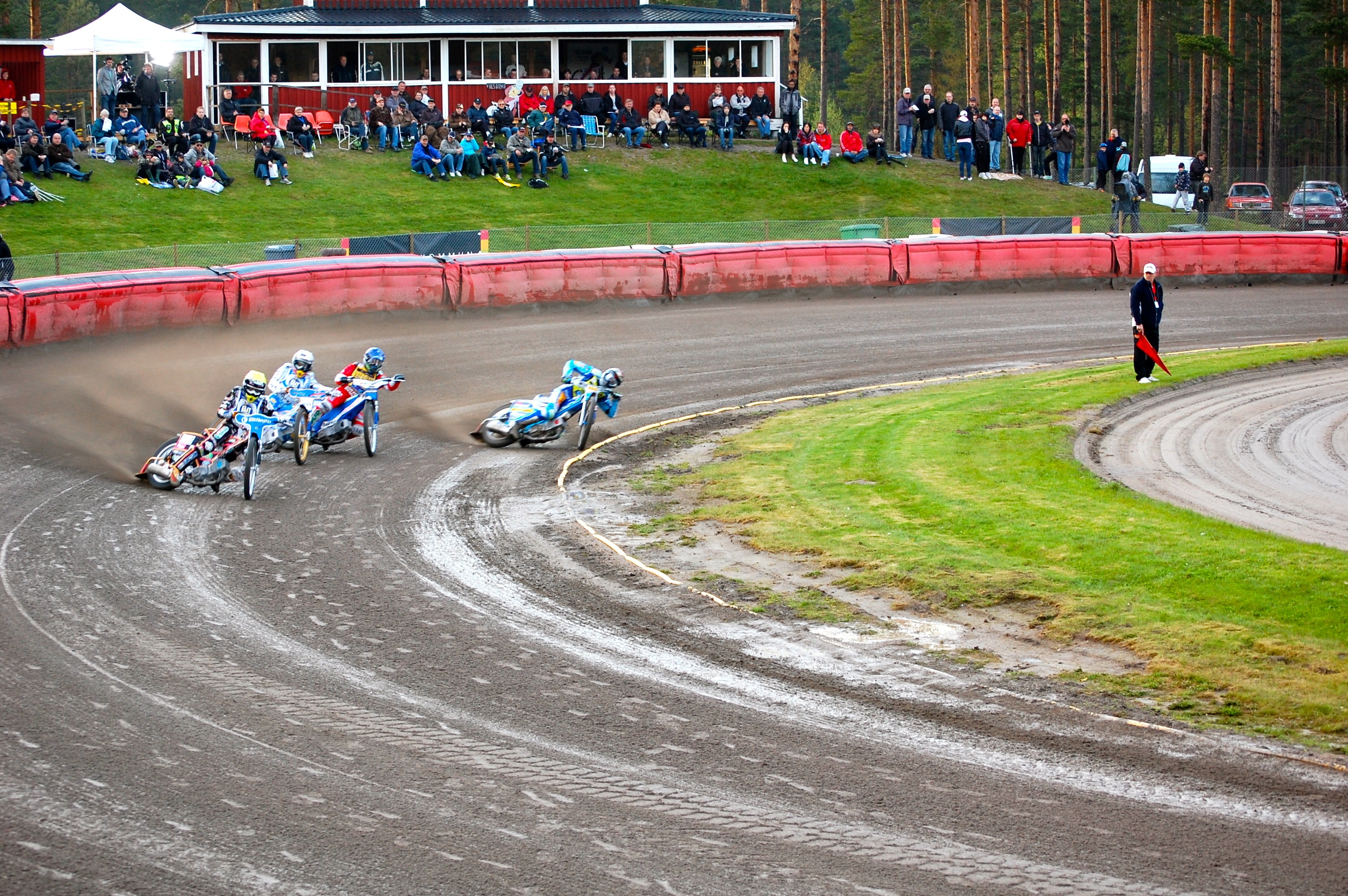
A 2012 match between Valsarna and Vetlanda

The club returned to league action in 1981 and spent the decade in the second tier before finally earning promotion during the 1993 Swedish speedway season.

=== 1994–1999 ===
For their first season in the Elitserien they signed one of the world's leading riders in Tony Rickardsson and along with Marvyn Cox and Stefan Dannö the club finished runner up to Örnarna. The team finished runner up again after recruiting Tomasz Gollob in 1997. Despite losing Gollob the following season, Rickardsson, Dannö and Rune Holta oversaw the club's first ever Championship win in 1998. The team saw Sam Ermolenko replace Rickardsson and with the addition of Mikael Karlsson the team successfully defended their crown in 1999.

=== 2000–present ===
From 2003 until 2009 the team competed in the second tier before returning to the Elitserien following their 2009 Allsvenskan win.

The club have since returned to the Allsvenskan, a competition that they won again during the 2022 Swedish Speedway season.

== Teams ==
=== 2023 team ===
- (Sweden) Antonio Lindbäck

=== 2022 team ===
- (Sweden) Antonio Lindbäck
- (Sweden) Victor Palovaara
- (Sweden) Philip Hellström Bängs
- (Finland) Jesse Mustonen
- (Norway) Lasse Fredriksen
- (Sweden) Rasmus Broberg
- (England) Leon Flint
- (Sweden) Jeremia Thelaus
- (Sweden) Tomas Jonassen
- (Sweden) Adrian Bergqvist

== Notable riders ==
- (England) Marvyn Cox
- (Sweden) Stefan Dannö
- (United States) Sam Ermolenko
- (Poland) Tomasz Gollob
- (Norway) Rune Holta
- (Sweden) Mikael Karlsson
- (Sweden) Daniel Nermark
- (Sweden) Tony Rickardsson
