= Peter Nahlin =

Swedish speedway rider

- Born: 1 May 1968 (age 58); Eskilstuna, Sweden
- Nationality: Swedish

Career history

Sweden
- 1984–1985: Getingarna
- 1986–1996, 2001–2004: Smederna
- 1997–2000: Vargarna
- 2001: Örnarna
- 2005: Bajen Speedway

Great Britain
- 1988–1991, 1995: Swindon Robins
- 1992–1993, 1998–1999: Eastbourne Eagles
- 1994: Cradley Heathens
- 2000: Belle Vue Aces

Poland
- 1991: Toruń
- 1992: Piła
- 1994: Zielona Góra
- 1997: Bydgoszcz

Denmark
- 1990: Fredericia

Individual honours
- 1988: World Under-21 Champion
- 1997: Nordic Champion

Team honours
- 1985: Swedish Elite League Champion
- 1989, 1992: Swedish National League Champion
- 1997: Polish League Champion
- 2001: Allsvenskan Winner

Jan Erik Peter Nahlin (born 1 May 1968 in Eskilstuna) is a Swedish former Motorcycle speedway rider who became the 1988 World Under-21 Champion. He earned 32 caps for the Sweden national speedway team.

== Career ==
=== Sweden ===
Nahlin first rode for Swedish team Getingarna in 1984 and 1985, winning the Swedish Elite League Championship in 1985. He then rode for Smederna from 1986 until 1996 before moving again to Vargarna in 1997. Nahlin would stay with Vargarna until 2000 but would move back to Smederna in 2001. He stayed at Smederna until 2004 when he moved once more to Bajen Speedway for what would be his final season before retiring in 2005.

=== United Kingdom ===
Nahlin rode in England for the Swindon Robins from 1988 until 1991 before signing with the Eastbourne Eagles in 1992, staying with the southern English team for two seasons before moving to the Cradley Heathens for 1994, his last year riding in the British Leagues.

=== Poland ===
Nahlin started riding for Apator Toruń in Poland in 1991, finishing in third in the Polish Team Championship that year. He then rode for Polonia Piła in 1992. He didn't ride in Poland in 1993 but returned in 1994 to ride one season for ZKŻ Zielona Góra. After not riding again in Poland in 1995 and 1996, he had one last season in Poland with Polonia Bydgoszcz in 1997, winning the Polish Team Championship.

=== International ===
Nahlin was a frequent member of the Swedish World Team Cup sides in the early 1990s as well as representing Sweden in Test Matches against various nations, including touring Australia in January 1991 to help Sweden win a five match series against Australia 3–2.

In 2005, Nahlin rode one heat as track reserve in the 2005 Swedish Grand Prix. Nahlin is currently one of the expert commentators on SVT's speedway broadcasts.

Nahlin finished second with his Swedish teammates at the 1991 World Team Cup Final in Vojens, Denmark, and backed that up by finishing second again in the 1992 Final at Kumla (both times riding alongside Tony Rickardsson, Henrik Gustafsson, Per Jonsson and Jimmy Nilsen). Sweden finished in third place in the 1993 Final in Coventry, England.

== Speedway Grand Prix results ==
Year	Position	Points	Best finish	Notes
2005	30th	0	-	Rode only in Swedish GP

== Career ==
Individual U-21 World Championship

- 1987 - Res - 8pts
- 1988 - Winner - 14pts

Speedway World Team Cup

- 1991 - 2nd - 30 (0)
- 1992 - 2nd - 33 (2)

Swedish Speedway Championship

- 1988 - 3rd
- 1991 - 2nd

Polish Team Championship

- 1991 - 3rd (with Apator Toruń)
- 1997 - Winner (with Jutrzenka-Polonia Bydgoszcz)

== See also ==
- List of Speedway Grand Prix riders
- Sweden national speedway team
