= Örnarna =

Swedish speedway club

Club information
- Track address: Grevby Motorstadion; Mariestad
- Country: Sweden
- Founded: 1949
- League: Allsvenskan

Club facts
- Colours: Blue and white

Major team honours
Team champions	1992, 1993, 1994, 1996
Second tier champions	1958, 1963, 1969, 1976, 2001, 2004, 2025

Örnarna (lit. 'the Eagles') is a motorcycle speedway team from Mariestad in Sweden, representing Mariestads MK, who compete in the Allsvenskan. Their home track is at the Grevby Motorstadion which is located to the north of Mariestad.

== History ==
=== 1949–1969 ===
Örnarna was founded in 1949. The club's debut season in the Swedish league was during the 1950 season, where they competed in division 2B. However, the club did not compete for the next seven years. When they returned for the 1958 Swedish speedway season they won their first honours after finishing top of division 2. The club remained in division 2 and repeated the success in 1963, which resulted to promotion to the highest division for the first time. The club signed Bengt Svensson and Per-Tage Svensson but struggled in division 1, before being relegated in 1967. In 1969, they once again won division 2.

=== 1970–1979 ===
The club spent the 1970s largely in division 1 (led by Karl-Erik Claesson and Börje Klingberg) but experienced limited success. In 1985, the club signed Peter Karlsson and in 1987, they finished second in division 1, their highest ever placing at the time. Peter Karlsson, together with Niklas Karlsson and Kelvin Tatum then helped the team finish runner up again in 1989.

=== 1990–1999 ===
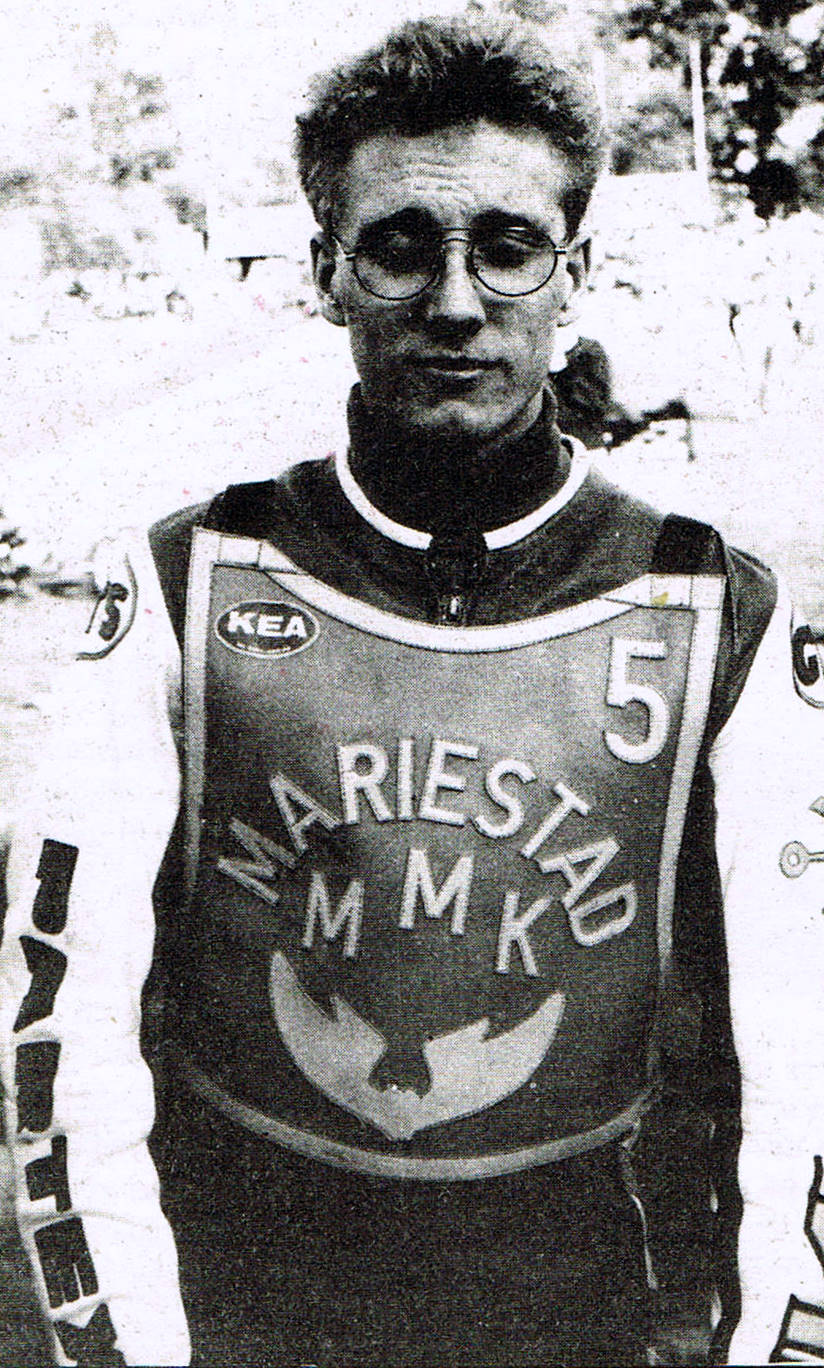
Peter Karlsson, club legend

The title still eluded the club in 1990 after another second place finish. Peter Karlsson's younger brother Mikael Karlsson and Niklas Klingberg began to improve their averages and after signing American Rick Miller and Christer Rohlén, they finally won the Elitserien for the first time during the 1992 Swedish speedway season. They then proceeded to win three more Swedish Speedway Team Championships in 1993, 1994 and 1996.

=== 2000–2019 ===
The millennium started badly and without the Karlsson brothers the club were relegated, scoring only 4 league points all season, although Niklas Klingberg managed to finish runner-up to Henrik Gustafsson in the Swedish individual Championship. The following season in 2001 the team won the second division but suffered immediate relegation in 2002. Another second division title came the club's way in 2004 but they remained in the second division.

It was not until 2010 that they competed for silverware again, losing to Hammarby Speedway in the play-off final. Rospiggarna then inflicted two play-off defeats on the Eagles in the 2011 semi-final and the 2013 final. Four tough seasons ensued in the Allsvenskan before the club dropped out of league in 2018.

=== 2020–present ===
The club returned to the Allsvenskan and finished 4th during the 2022 Swedish Speedway season. Two solid seasons in 2023 and 2024 provided a platform for the team to win the second division league title during the 2025 Swedish speedway season and sealing their first major honour for 21 years.

== Notable riders ==
- (Sweden) Oliver Berntzon
- (Sweden) Karl-Erik Claesson
- (Sweden) Niklas Karlsson
- (Sweden) Peter Karlsson
- (Sweden) Börje Klingberg
- (Sweden) Niklas Klingberg
- (Sweden) Bengt Larsson
- (United States) Rick Miller
- (Sweden) Christer Rohlén
- (Sweden) Mikael Max
- (Sweden) Per-Tage Svensson
- (England) Kelvin Tatum
- (Poland) Patryk Dudek
- (Ukraine) Andriy Karpov
