= Rospiggarna =

Swedish speedway team

Club information
- Track address: Hisstech AB Arena
- Country: Sweden
- Founded: 1930
- Team manager: Marcus Jansson
- League: Elitserien
- Website: Official website

Club facts
- Colours: Red, white and yellow
- Track size: 289 metres
- Track record time: 54.5 seconds
- Track record holder: Kai Huckenbeck

Major team honours
Team Championship Gold	1995, 1997, 2001, 2002 and 2016
Team Championship Silver	1996, 1998, 2000
Team Championship Bronze	1999
Second tier champions	1994

Rospiggarna is a motorcycle speedway team based in Hallstavik, Sweden. They ride in the Elitserien are five times champions of Sweden.

== History ==
=== 1930 to 1977 ===
The club was founded in 1930 and were named Orion, although it did not compete in the Swedish speedway leagues as Rospiggarna until 1963. In 1966 the team name was changed to Stjärnorna (English: The Stars). They competed in the lower leagues of the Swedish league system as Stjärnorna until 1978.

=== 1978 to 1993 ===
In 1978, the name was changed again to Rospiggarna which is the demonym for people from Roslagen, where Hallstavik is situated. The club were in the second tier, which became known as Division 1 because of the introduction of the Elitserien in 1982. Led by Bengt Jansson the team managed two second place finishes in division 1 in 1983 and 1984 before finally managing to gain promotion after winning the division in 1988. The team's leading riders were Jansson, Mikael Teurnberg and Ari Koponen. In 1992, the club signed one of the world's leading riders Tony Rickardsson. However in 1993, Rickardsson topped the league averages but the team finished last and were relegated.

=== 1994 to 2002 ===
In 1994, Per Jonsson replaced Rickardsson and solid performances by Erik Stenlund and Einar Kyllingstad earned promotion back to the Elitserien. Then in 1995, they brought in Greg Hancock to replace Jonsson and the team won their first ever Swedish Speedway Team Championship. A golden era ensued because they won the Championship again in 1997, 2001 and 2002. In addition they won the silver medal in 1996, 1998 and 2000 and the bronze in 1999. Riders such as Hancock, Jimmy Nilsen, Andreas Jonsson, Lee Richardson and Ryan Sullivan were all prominent during this period.

=== 2003 to present ===
The team continued to compete in the Elitserien until 2010, when it was announced that the club voluntarily made the decision to drop down a division to the Allsvenskan due to financial problems. In 2014, the club returned to the Elitserien

In 2016 they won their fifth Swedish team Championship, with a team that included Andreas Jonsson, Jason Doyle and Martin Vaculik.

In 2025 the club formed a junior team called Team Campus Roslagen.

=== 2022-2023 ===
Rospiggarna's squad building for the 2022 season included Andzejs Lebedevs, who returned after five seasons with Smederna as the club's first new signing for 2022. Lebedevs had previously ridden for Rospiggarna during the 2014 and 2015 seasons and made a substitute appearance in the quarterfinals in 2020. The next rider added to Rospiggarna's 2022 squad was Victor Palovaara, who left Vetlanda Speedway for the club.

== Previous teams ==
Extended content

2016 team

- (Australia) Jason Doyle
- (Finland) Timo Lahti
- (Sweden) Andreas Jonsson
- (Slovakia) Martin Vaculik
- (Poland) Krzysztof Buczkowski
- (Sweden) Jacob Thorssell
- (Australia) Max Fricke

2021 team

- (Germany) Norick Blödorn
- (Poland) Patryk Dudek
- (Sweden) Erik Gheorghe
- (Sweden) Daniel Henderson
- (Sweden) Oscar Holstensson
- (Germany) Kai Huckenbeck
- (Russia) Andrey Kudriashov
- (Finland) Timo Lahti
- (Poland) Adrian Miedziński
- (Latvia) Oļegs Mihailovs
- (Sweden) Kim Nilsson

Coach

- (Sweden) Peter Jansson

2022 team

- (Sweden) Victor Palovaara
- (Poland) Szymon Woźniak
- (Finland) Timo Lahti
- (Germany) Kai Huckenbeck
- (Sweden) Kim Nilsson
- (Poland) Adrian Miedziński
- (Sweden) Daniel Henderson
- (Latvia) Andžejs Ļebedevs
- (England) Adam Ellis
- (Poland) Tomasz Gapiński
- (Denmark) Kevin Juhl Pedersen

2023 team

- (United States) Luke Becker
- (France) Dimitri Bergé
- (Sweden) Eddie Bock
- (Germany) Kai Huckenbeck
- (Finland) Timo Lahti
- (Sweden) Antonio Lindbäck
- (Sweden) Kim Nilsson
- (Sweden) Victor Palovaara
- (Poland) Wiktor Przyjemski
- (Sweden) Christoffer Selvin
- (Sweden) Johannes Stark
- (Poland) Grzegorz Zengota

== Notable riders ==
- (Australia) Jason Doyle
- (United States) Greg Hancock
- (Sweden) Bengt Jansson
- (Sweden) Andreas Jonsson
- (Sweden) Per Jonsson
- (Finland) Ari Koponen
- (Norway) Einar Kyllingstad
- (Sweden) Jimmy Nilsen
- (England) Lee Richardson
- (Sweden) Tony Rickardsson
- (Sweden) Erik Stenlund
- (Australia) Ryan Sullivan
- (Sweden) Mikael Teurnberg
- (Slovakia) Martin Vaculik
