= Masarna =

Swedish speedway team

Masarna Avesta

Club information
- Track address: Avesta Motorstadion; Avesta, Sweden
- Country: Sweden
- Founded: 1937
- League: Allsvenskan (in 2024)
- Website: Official website

Club facts
- Colours: Blue and yellow
- Track size: 315 metres
- Track record time: 57.0 seconds
- Track record date: 8 August 2006
- Track record holder: Leigh Adams

Major team honours
| Team Championship | 2000, 2020 |
| Second tier | 1959, 1961, 1974, 1998, 2015 |
| Third tier | 1990, 2023 |

Masarna are a Swedish motorcycle speedway team based in Avesta, Sweden. They last rode in the Elitserien during the 2022 Swedish Speedway season but are currently not racing due to financial problems. They are two times champions of Sweden.

== History ==
=== 1937 to 1964 ===
The club was founded in 1937 as the Folkare Motorklubb but their first track at Nordanö (between Jularbo and Krylbo) was built in 1948. The club joined the Swedish second division in 1958 (which was known as the Allsvenskan from 1982). Led by Sören Sjösten, they gained success in 1959 by winning division 2 and the successfully defended the title in 1960.

=== 1965 to 1978 ===
Folkare changed their name to Masarna for the 1965 Swedish speedway season and for the remainder of the 1960s struggled in division 2. They won their first honours 'as Masarna' by winning division 2 again in 1974. The team left the Nordanö track circa.1969 and raced at the Avestavallen but because the stadium was near the centre of Avesta, it was not a permanent solution as a home.

=== 1979 to 1981 ===
In 1979, Masarna moved to the Avesta Motorstadion from the Avestavallen. They remained in division 2 until 1982.

=== 1982 to 1998 ===
The introduction of the Elitserien in 1982 saw the team pushed into the third tier of the league system. It was not until 1990 that the club experienced any success and that was winning division 2 (the third tier). Eight years later the club won division 1 and finally gained promotion to the Elitserien in 1999.

=== 1999 to 2019 ===
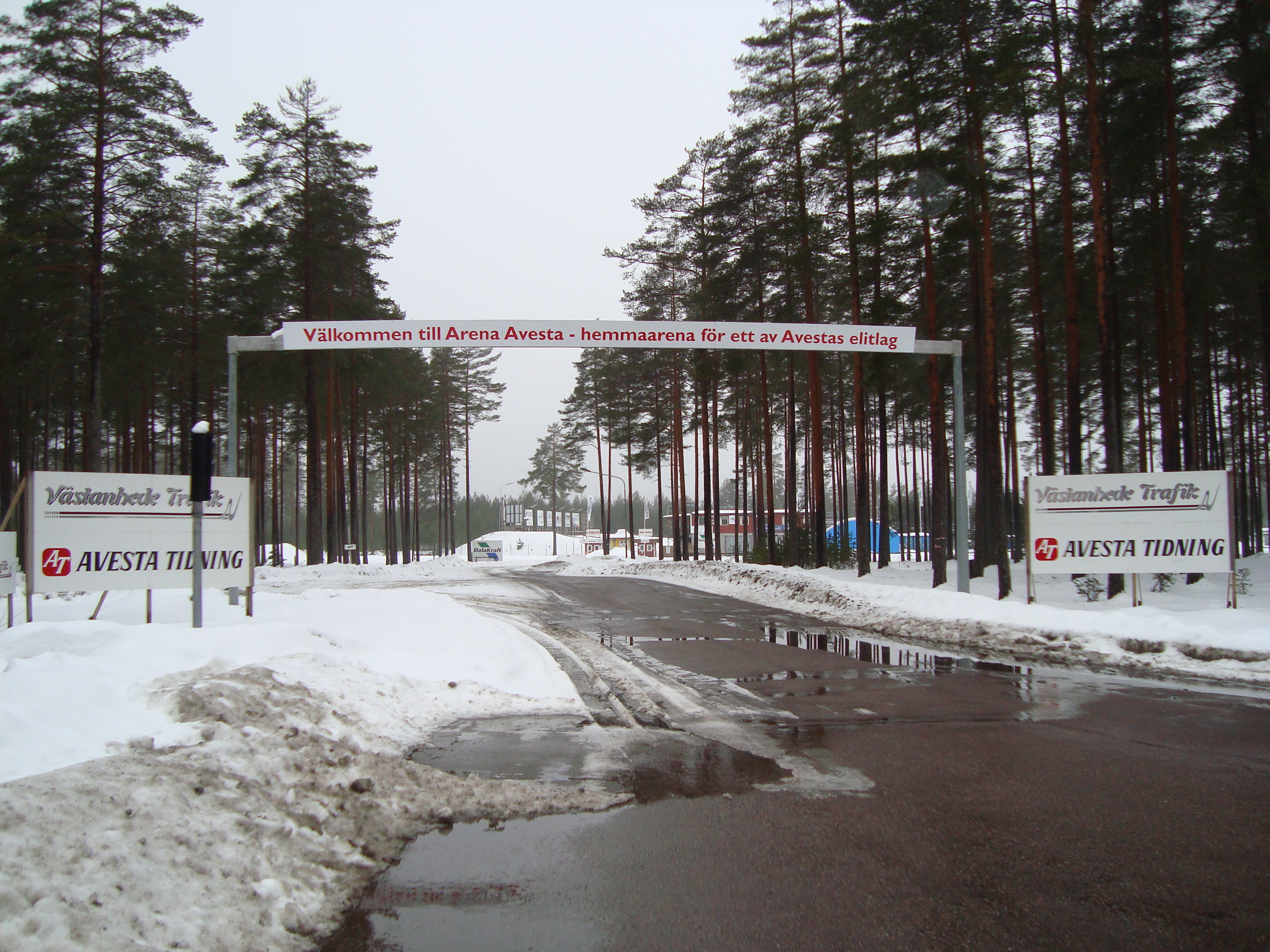
Entrance to the Avesta Stadium in 2009

The club intended to make a serious challenge for the Elitserien and signed world champion Tony Rickardsson and Antonín Kasper Jr. They finished runner up to Valsarna but then the following year they won their first Swedish Speedway Team Championship. The 2000 season had seen Leigh Adams and Gary Havelock added to the squad.

Masarna continued to compete in the highest division until they were relegated in 2008 to the Allsvenskan, after finishing bottom of the Elitserien table although they had already announced their intention to drop a division for the 2009 season. They later returned to the Elitserien after winning the 2015 Allsvenskan.

=== 2020 to present ===
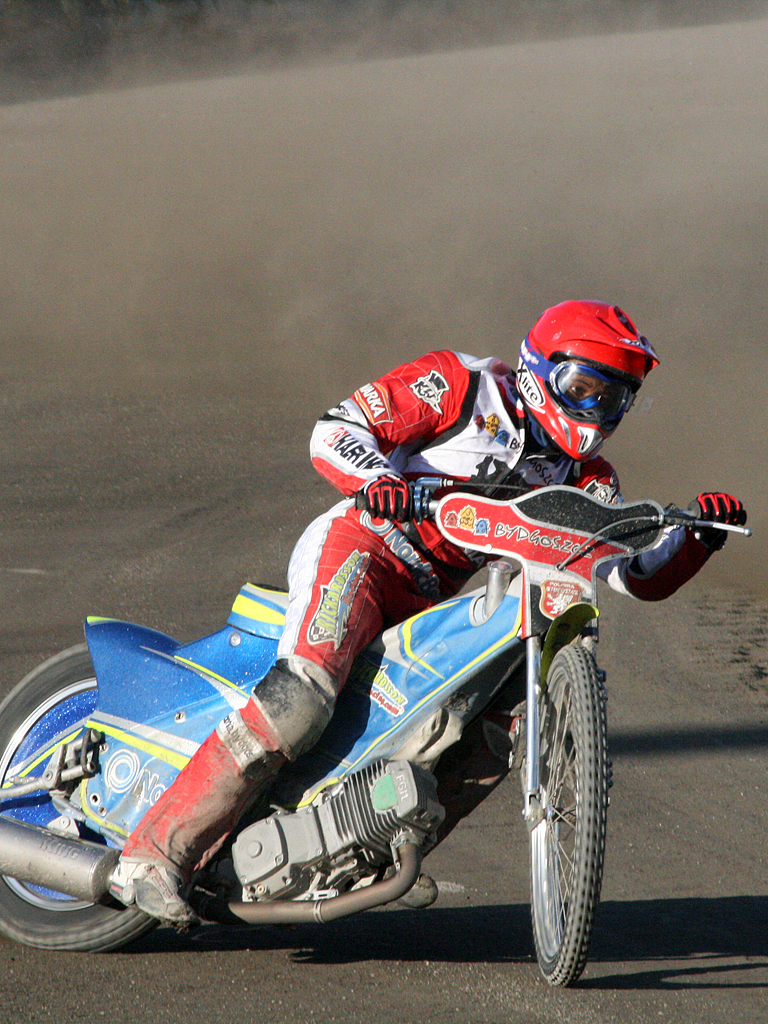
Antonio Lindbäck

The team won a second Swedish title in 2020, despite finishing fifth in the regular season table; the team peaked at the right time and went on to defeat Indianerna in the final. the successful team included Antonio Lindbäck, Nicki Pedersen and Kim Nilsson.

Despite the success experienced in 2020, the club withdrew from the league for the 2023 season due to financial problems. In 2023, they did however run a team in the third tier of Swedish speedway (known as Division 1) and won the competition that season. For the 2024 Swedish speedway season, the team would return to the Allsvenskan.

== Season summary ==
=== Previous teams ===
Extended content

2014 team

- (Sweden) Eric Andersson
- (Sweden) Dennis Andersson
- (Sweden) Thomas H. Jonasson
- (Latvia) Maksim Bogdanovs
- (Sweden) Fredrik Engman
- (Sweden) Anton Rosén
- (Finland) Ted Hagansbo

2020 team (champions)

- (Sweden) Antonio Lindbäck
- (Denmark) Nicki Pedersen
- (Poland) Przemysław Pawlicki
- (Sweden) Kim Nilsson
- (France) David Bellego
- (Sweden) Philip Hellström Bängs
- (Russia) Vadim Tarasenko
- (Australia) Rohan Tungate
- (Germany) Martin Smolinski
- (Poland) Oskar Fajfer
- (France) Dimitri Bergé

2021 team

- (Sweden) Antonio Lindbäck
- (Poland) Przemysław Pawlicki
- (Poland) Piotr Pawlicki Jr.
- (France) David Bellego
- (Sweden) Philip Hellström Bängs
- (Sweden) Emil Millberg
- (Germany) Martin Smolinski
- (Denmark) Patrick Hansen
- (France) Dimitri Bergé

2022 team

- Manager Sebastian Aldén & Anton Rosén
- (Latvia) Francis Gusts
- (Sweden) Antonio Lindbäck
- (Poland) Krzysztof Buczkowski
- (Czech Republic) Jan Kvěch
- (Australia) Rohan Tungate
- (Poland) Przemysław Pawlicki
- (Sweden) Philip Hellström Bängs
- (Poland) Kacper Gomólski
- (Poland) Adrian Gala
- (Denmark) Tim Sørensen
- (Sweden) Emil Millberg
- (Sweden) Eddie Bock
- (Sweden) Aleks Lundquist

== Notable riders ==
- (Australia) Leigh Adams
- (England) Gary Havelock
- (Sweden) Hasse Holmqvist
- (Czech Republic) Antonín Kasper Jr.
- (Sweden) Antonio Lindbäck
- (Sweden) Kim Nilsson
- (Denmark) Nicki Pedersen
- (Sweden) Tony Rickardsson
- (Sweden) Sören Sjösten
