= Indianerna =

Swedish motorcycle speedway team

Club information
- Track address: Glottra Skog Arena
- Country: Sweden
- Founded: 1936
- Team manager: Peter Johansson
- League: Elitserien
- Website: Official website

Club facts
- Colours: Red, white and black
- Nickname: Indians
- Track size: 375 metres
- Track record time: 61.5
- Track record date: 2025
- Track record holder: Patryk Dudek

Major team honours
Team Championship Gold	1990, 1991
Team Championship Silver	1953, 1976, 1988, 1992, 1995, 2011, 2015, 2020
Team Championship Bronze	1952, 1954, 1977, 1986, 1987, 1989, 1996, 1998
Second Division Champions	1967

Indianerna (the Indians) are a Swedish motorcycle speedway team based in Kumla, Sweden. The club's official name is Kumla MSK and it was founded in 1936 which makes the club one of the oldest motorsport clubs in Sweden. They are two times champions of Sweden. and compete in the Elitserien Their home stadium is the Glottra Skog Arena (Sannaheds Motorstadion) south of Kumla.

== History ==
=== 1948 to 1957 ===
Indianerna was one of the seven teams that competed in Sweden's first speedway league in 1948. From 1952 to 1954 they managed to finish in the top three teams. Göte Olsson was the team's leading rider during the period.

=== 1962 to 1985 ===
After missing four seasons the team returned in the second division of the 1962 Swedish speedway season. After a lean spell they won the second division in 1967 but were relegated in 1970. The performances of Bernt Persson and Hasse Holmqvist brought the club back to prominence, culminating in a silver medal during the 1976 Swedish speedway season. The team continued to compete in the top tier during the following nine years but without trophy success.

=== 1986 to 1992 ===
The golden period for the club started in 1986 with two third-place finishes in 1986 and 1987, this was followed by a second place the following year and another third place in 1989. In 1990, the team won the Elitserien and were declared the winners of the Swedish Speedway Team Championship for the first time. They retained the Championship for the second successive season in 1991 and took another silver in 1992. Riders over the period included Henrik Gustafsson, Roland Dannö, Simon Wigg, Christer Rohlén, Lars Gunnestad, Mikael Blixt, John Cook and Stefan Dannö.

=== 1993 to present ===
Henrik Gustafsson continued to lead the club during the remainder of the 1990s and into the mid-2000s. He became a club legend as the club continually retained their status in the Elitserien. Magnus Zetterström replaced Gustafsson as the club's leading rider before Antonio Lindbäck helped them top the table in 2011, only to lose to Piraterna in the play off final.

In recent years the club has won the silver medal twice in 2015 and 2020 and as of 2023 remain in the Elitserien.

== Previous teams ==
Extended content

2015 Team

- (Poland) Piotr Protasiewicz
- (Denmark) Niels-Kristian Iversen
- (Sweden) Antonio Lindbäck
- (Sweden) Fredrik Lindgren
- (Russia) Artem Laguta
- (Australia) Rory Schlein
- (England) Scott Nicholls
- (Sweden) Joel Andersson

Guest Riders

- (Sweden) Robin Törnqvist
- (Sweden) Anders Mellgren
- (Sweden) Freddy Godlund

2022 teams

First team

- (Denmark) Niels Kristian Iversen
- (Australia) Max Fricke
- (Poland) Norbert Krakowiak
- (Australia) Chris Holder
- (France) David Bellego
- (Poland) Norbert Kościuch
- (Sweden) Gustav Grahn
- (Sweden) Jonatan Grahn
- (Denmark) Andreas Lyager

2nd & 3rd teams

- (Denmark) Marius Nielsen
- (Australia) Fraser Bowes
- (Latvia) Ričards Ansviesulis
- (Finland) Tero Aarnio
- (Sweden) Hugo Lundahl
- (Sweden) Max Belsing
- (Sweden) Alexander Jacobsson Sundkvist
- (Sweden) Eddie Bock
- (Sweden) Theo Bergkvist
- (Sweden) Johannes Stark
- (Sweden) Erik Persson
- (Sweden) Christoffer Selvin
- (Sweden) Ludvig Selvin

2023 team

- (Finland) Tero Aarnio
- (Poland) Krzysztof Buczkowski
- (Australia) Jason Doyle
- (Australia) Max Fricke
- (Sweden) Gustav Grahn
- (Sweden) Jonatan Grahn
- (Poland) Bartłomiej Kowalski
- (Poland) Norbert Krakowiak
- (Sweden) Hugo Lundahl
- (Australia) Rohan Tungate
- (Poland) Szymon Wozniak

== Notable riders ==
- (Sweden) Mikael Blixt
- (United States) John Cook
- (Sweden) Roland Dannö
- (Sweden) Stefan Dannö
- (Sweden) Henrik Gustafsson
- (Norway) Lars Gunnestad
- (Sweden) Hasse Holmqvist
- (Sweden) Lillebror Johansson
- (Sweden) Sören Karlsson
- (Sweden) Antonio Lindbäck
- (Sweden) Freddie Lindgren
- (Sweden) Göte Olsson
- (Sweden) Bernt Persson
- (Sweden) Christer Rohlén
- (England) Simon Wigg
- (Sweden) Magnus Zetterström
