= Speedway in Sweden =

Motorcycle speedway in Sweden

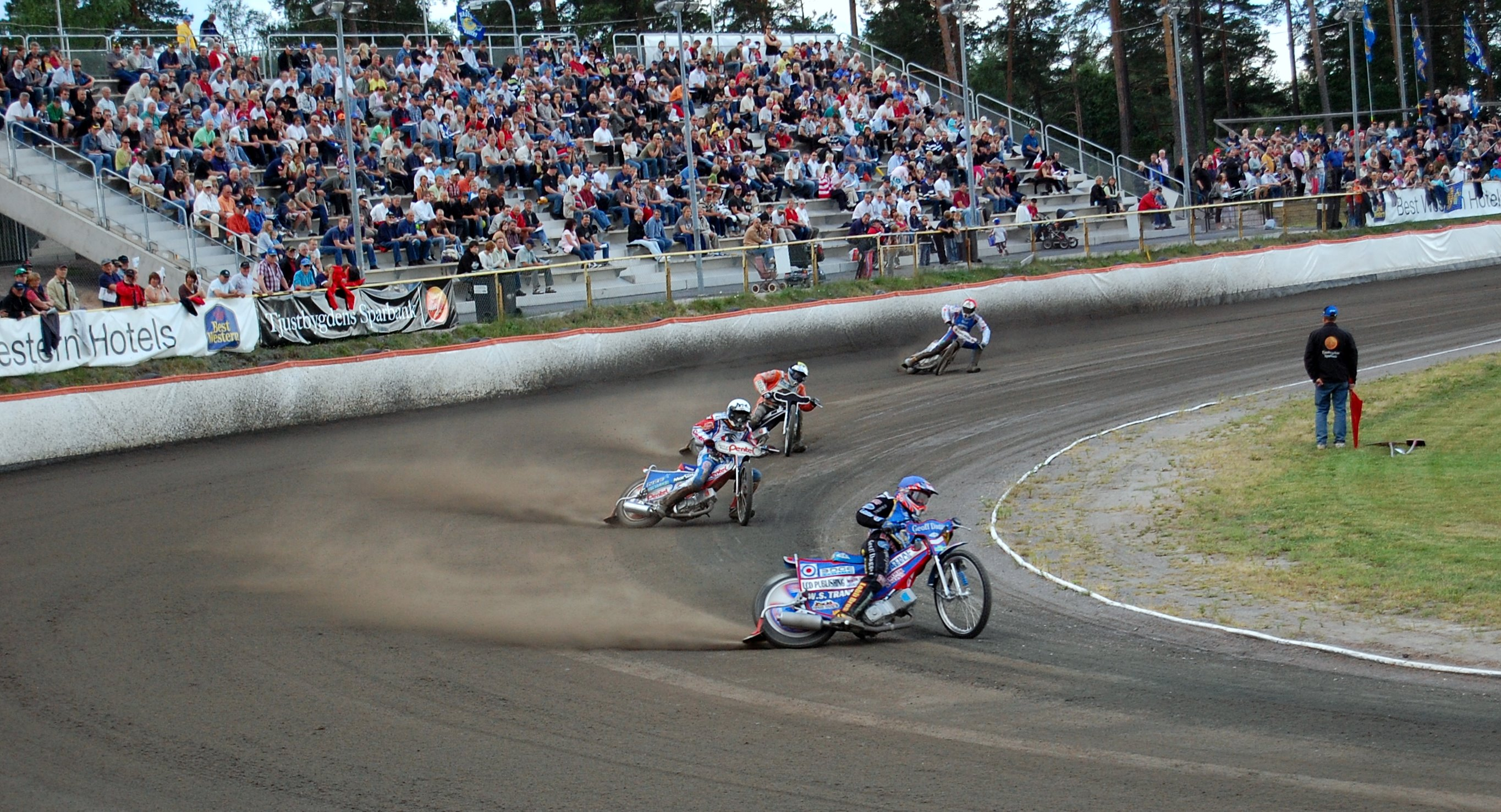
An Elitserien speedway meeting featuring teams from Västervik and Indianerna in June 2007

Speedway in Sweden is one of the recognised 'four big leagues' in world speedway (along with Great Britain, Poland and Denmark). The Swedish leagues consists of three domestic leagues, an individual World Championship round of the Speedway Grand Prix and an annual entry into the Speedway World Cup or equivalent. Sweden has produced five World Champions and the Sweden national speedway team have been World Cup winners on ten occasions. Speedway is one of the most popular motorsports in the country.

== History ==
The Swedish speedway league was founded in 1948 and was inspired by British speedway including adopting British teams nicknames in Swedish versions. As popularity of the sport grew many new clubs were founded all around Sweden and during the 1950s and over 30 different clubs have competed in at least one season in the league system.

== League competitions ==
There are three leagues in Sweden:

- Elite League (Elitserien) (first tier)
- Allsvenskan (second tier)
- Division One (third tier)

Speedway meetings in Sweden are normally held between May and September. Swedish teams are generally known by nicknames rather than club or city names. These nicknames usually have some sort of local connection.

The Elitserien was established in 1982. At the end of each season the leading teams form the regular season table compete in play-offs to determine the Elitserien champions. The second tier/division is called the Allsvenskan (which used to be the highest league before 1982) and takes place in a similar manner to the Elitserien.

== Other competitions ==
- Speedway Grand Prix of Sweden (world championship round)
- Speedway Grand Prix of Scandinavia (former world championship round)
- Swedish Individual Speedway Championship
- Swedish U21 Individual Championship

== See also ==
- Swedish Speedway Team Championship
- Elitserien (speedway)
- Allsvenskan (speedway)
- List of speedway teams in Sweden
