= Peter Karlsson (speedway rider) =

Swedish speedway rider

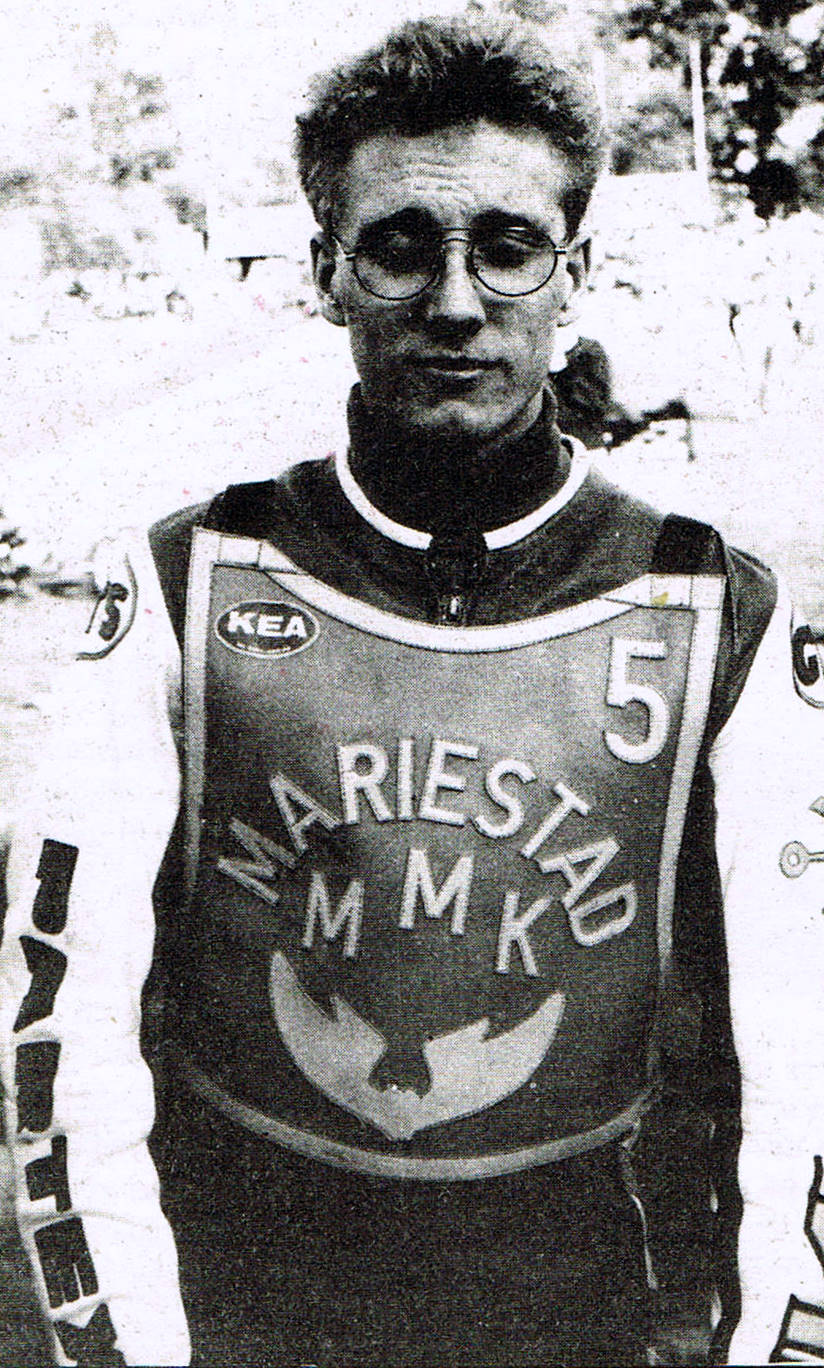
- Born: 18 December 1969 (age 56); Gullspång, Sweden
- Nickname: PK
- Nationality: Swedish

Career history

Sweden
- 1983–1997, 2011–2016: Örnarna
- 1998–2003: Kaparna
- 2004–2010: Dackarna
- 2011: Elit Vetlanda
- 2012: Vargarna
- 2013–2015: Smederna
- 2016: Lejonen
- 2017: Piraterna

Great Britain
- 1990, 1992–1997, 1999, 2002–2003, 2006–2007, 2009, 2011, 2014–2015, 2016: Wolverhampton Wolves
- 2000, 2005: Peterborough Panthers
- 2001: King's Lynn Stars
- 2001, 2010: Belle Vue Aces
- 2012–2014: Lakeside Hammers

Poland
- 1991: Bydgoszcz
- 1996–1997, 2001: Piła
- 1998, 2002: Rybnik
- 1999–2000: Toruń
- 2003: Tarnów
- 2004: TŻ Lublin
- 2005–2007, 2012–2014: Ostrów
- 2008–2009: Gorzów
- 2010–2011: Częstochowa

Individual honours
- 1989, 1991: Swedish Champion
- 2000: GP Challenge
- 1989: Nordic Under-21 Champion

Team honours
- 2000, 2003, 2004: Speedway World Cup
- 1996: Premier League
- 2002, 2009, 2016: Elite League
- 1996: Premier League KO Cup winner
- 1992, 1997: Premiership Winner
- 1992: Gold Cup Winner
- 1992, 1993, 1994, 1996, 2003, 2007: Swedish Elitserien Champion
- 1992, 1996: Swedish Pairs Champion

Peter Gunnar Karlsson (born 18 December 1969) is a Swedish former motorcycle speedway rider. He was twice Swedish champion and a three times World Cup winner. He earned 40 caps for the Sweden national speedway team.

== Career ==
Karlsson first rode for Wolverhampton Wolves in Britain during the 1990 season.

Karlsson won the Swedish Pairs Championship twice with brother Mikael Max, in 1992 and 1996 and was the Swedish Individual Champion in 1989 and 1991.

In October 2000, during the Speedway Grand Prix Qualification, Karlsson won the GP Challenge, which ensured that he claimed a permanent slot for the 2001 Grand Prix.

Karlsson is regarded as a legend at parent club Wolverhampton where he helped them win the 2009 Elite League title despite suffering with a broken collarbone two weeks prior to the play off final. Due to the average points limit, Karlsson had to move on in 2010 and joined Belle Vue Aces on loan. For the 2012 season, he signed for Lakeside Hammers, where he spent three seasons.

In 2016, Karlsson wasn't originally in Wolverhampton's plans but after Mikel Beck pulled out of the team leaving the door open for Karlsson to join back. He accepted and joined for the remainder of the season. He would later play a huge role as the 2016 team beat Belle Vue over 2 legs in the Elite League final. After the Belle Vue meeting, he announced his retirement from British Speedway.

== Family ==
Karlsson's two younger brothers, Mikael Max and Magnus Karlsson were both motorcycle speedway riders. All three brothers represented Sweden in the 2007 Speedway World Cup, with Magnus riding at reserve.

== Career Achievements ==
- World Under-21 Finalist (1989, 1990)
- Swedish Champion (1989, 1991)
- World Finalist (1993)
- Speedway Grand Prix Rider (1995, 1996, 1997, 1999, 2000, 2001)
- Swedish GP Wildcard (1998, 2002, 2003)
- Polish GP Wildcard (2003)
- Speedway World Team Cup Champion (2000)
- Speedway World Cup Champion (2003, 2004)
- Slovenian GP Wildcard (2003)
- Czech GP Wildcard (2003)
- European GP Wildcard (2003)
- Norwegian GP Wildcard (2003)
- Scandinavian GP Wildcard (2004, 2007)
- German GP Wildcard (2007)
- Swedish Finalist (2008)

== World Final Appearances ==
- 1993 - (Germany) Pocking, Rottalstadion - 8th - 8pts

== Speedway Grand Prix results ==
Year	Position	Points	Best Finish	Notes
1996	6th	62	2nd	2nd in German Grand Prix
1997	12th	37	6th	
1998	17th	27	3rd	3rd in Swedish Grand Prix
1999	13th	45	6th	
2000	15th	35	9th	
2001	15th	39	5th	Missed British Grand Prix through injury
2002	23rd	21	9th	Rode in four Grand Prix out of ten
2003	21st	28	13th	Missed Swedish Grand Prix through injury
2004	28th	7		One meeting as Swedish Grand Prix Wildcard

== See also ==
- Sweden national speedway team
- List of Speedway Grand Prix riders
