= 1988 Speedway World Team Cup =

29th edition of the annual motorcycle speedway World Cup competition

Seasons
- ← 1987 1989 →

The 1988 Speedway World Team Cup was the 29th edition of the FIM Speedway World Team Cup to determine the team world champions.

The three legged final format was scrapped and a one off final returned, which was held at the Veterans Memorial Stadium (Long Beach) in California, United States. It made no difference to Denmark who duly wrapped up a sixth consecutive title (and eighth in total) moving level with England's record. It was also Hans Nielsen's eighth gold medal having taken part in all of Denmark's title wins.

== First round ==
- 10 April 1988
- (Austria) Stadion Wiener Neustadt, Wiener Neustadt

1st	2nd	3rd	4th
Austria - 41; Heinrich Schatzer - 14; Siegfried Eder - 12; Walter Nebel - 7 Robert Funk - 7 Andreas Bössner - 1	New Zealand - 35; Mitch Shirra - 14; Gary Allan - 9 Alan Rivett - 8 Bruce Cribb - 4	Norway - 25; Ingvar Skogland - 10; Arnt Förland - 7 Tor Einar Hielm - 5 Einar Kyllingstad - 2 Arne Svendsen - 1	Netherlands - 19; Henny Kroeze - 8 Henk Steman - 7 Robert Jan Munnecom - 3 Rob Steman - 1 Rene Elzinga - 0

- Austria to second round

== Second round ==
Day	Venue	Winner
2nd round
26 June	(Hungary) Szeged	Hungary
3 July	(Italy) Lonigo	Hungary

Leg 1

- 26 June 1988
- (Hungary) Napos út, Szeged

1st	2nd	3rd	4th
Hungary - 52; Sándor Tihanyi - 15; Zoltán Adorján - 14; Antal Kocso - 12; Janosh Balogh - 7 József Petrikovics - 4	Italy - 41; Armando Dal Chiele - 13; Armando Castagna - 10; Paolo Salvatelli - 9 Valentino Furlanetto - 9 Gianni Famari - NS	Bulgaria - 15; Nikolai Manev - 5 Georgi Petranov - 3 Rudolf Valentinov - 3 Angel Eftimov - 3 Orlin Janakiev - 1	Austria - 12; Walter Nebel - 5 Robert Funk - 4 Toni Pilotto - 3 Siegfried Eder - 0 Heinrich Schatzer - 0

Leg 2

- 3 July 1988
- (Italy) Santa Marina Stadium, Lonigo

1st	2nd	3rd	4th
Hungary - 44; Zoltán Adorján - 12; József Petrikovics - 12; Antal Kocso - 11; Sándor Tihanyi - 5 Janosh Balogh - 4	Italy - 43; Armando Castagna - 14; Valentino Furlanetto - 12; Paolo Salvatelli - 9 Ottaviano Righetto - 8 Armando Dal Chiele - 0	Austria - 22; Walter Nebel - 6 Robert Funk - 5 Toni Pilotto - 5 Andreas Bössner - 5 Siegfried Eder - 1	Bulgaria - 10; Georgi Petranov - 3 Rudolf Valentinov - 3 Nikolai Manev - 2 Orlin Janakiev - 1 Aleksi Todorov - 1

- Hungary to third round

== Third round ==
- 12 August 1988
- (West Germany) Ellermühle Speedway Stadium, Landshut

1st	2nd	3rd	4th
West Germany - 40; Klaus Lausch - 11; Tommy Dunker - 10; Karl Maier - 10; Gerd Riss - 9 Hans Faltermaier - 0	Hungary - 38; Zoltán Adorján - 14; Antal Kocso - 13; Sándor Tihanyi - 8 Janosh Balogh - 3 József Petrikovics - 0	Australia - 32; Stephen Davies - 11; Mick Poole - 9 Craig Hodgson - 6 Troy Butler - 5 Steve Baker - 1	Finland - 10; Ari Koponen - 4 Aki Ala-Riihimäki - 2 Olli Tyrväinen - 2 Roy Malminheimo - 2 Kai Niemi - 0

West Germany to fourth round

== Fourth round ==
Day	Venue	Winner
4th round
21 August	(Czechoslovakia) Prague	Sweden
25 August	(Sweden) Linköping	Sweden

Leg 1

- 21 August 1988
- (Czechoslovakia) Markéta Stadium, Prague

Placing	Team / Rider name	Total	1	2	3	4	5	6	7	8	9	10	11	12	13	14	15	16	Pts	17	18	19	20
1	Sweden	49	3	6	9	11	14	17	19	21	23	26	29	32	33	35	38	39		42	44	47	49
1	(5) Per Jonsson	13	3					3					3					1	10			3
1	(6) Jimmy Nilsen	14		3			3							3			3		12				2
1	(7) Tony Olsson	11				2			2			3				2			9		2
1	(8) Conny Ivarsson	6			3					2	-				1				6	-
1	(18) Henrik Gustafsson	5									2								2	3
2	Czechoslovakia	28	1	2	3	6	6	7	7	10	11	11	11	13	16	16	18	20		22	25	27	28
2	(1) Roman Matoušek	11				3				3				2				2	10				1
2	(2) Antonín Kasper Jr.	6			1				0				E				2		3		3
2	(3) Lubomír Jedek	7		1				1				F			3				5			2
2	(4) Petr Vandírek	4	1				0				1					-			2	2
2	(17) Bohumil Brhel	0														0			0
3	West Germany	26	0	3	5	6	7	9	10	10	13	14	16	16	18	21	22	25		25	25	26	26
3	(13) Gerd Riss	10		3					1		3							3	10				0
3	(14) Klaus Lausch	1	0							0		-					1		1	0
3	(15) Karl Maier	8			2			2						0		3			7			1
3	(16) Tommy Dunker	6				1	1						2		2				6		0
3	(20) Hans Faltermaier	1										1							1
4	Poland	17	2	2	2	2	4	4	7	8	8	10	11	12	12	13	13	13		14	15	15	17
4	(9) Roman Jankowski	4			0		2					2						0	4			0
4	(10) Piotr Świst	0				0		0			-						E		0	-
4	(11) Andrzej Huszcza	4		0						1			1			1			3		1
4	(12) Zenon Kasprzak	8	2						3					1	0				6				2
4	(19) Eugeniusz Skupien	1									0								0	1
Placing	Team / Rider name	Total	1	2	3	4	5	6	7	8	9	10	11	12	13	14	15	16	Pts	17	18	19	20

M - exclusion for exceeding two-minute time allowance • T - exclusion for touching the tapes • X - other exclusion • E - retired or mechanical failure • F - fell

Helmet colours were permanent for each team (Red, Blue, White and Yellow/Black). Colours in diagrams indicate gate positions:
gate A – inside	gate B	gate C	gate D – outside

Leg 2

- 25 August 1988
- (Sweden) Linköping Motorstadion, Linköping

Placing	Team / Rider name	Total	1	2	3	4	5	6	7	8	9	10	11	12	13	14	15	16	Pts	17	18	19	20
1	Sweden	51	3	6	9	12	15	17	20	22	25	28	30	33	36	38	41	42		45	48	50	51
1	(9) Per Jonsson	10			3		3					3						-	9				1
1	(10) Jimmy Nilsen	11				3		2			-						3		8		3
1	(11) Tony Olsson	10		3						2			-			2			7	3
1	(12) Conny Ivarsson	11	3						3					3	-				9			2
1	(19) Henrik Gustafsson	9									3		2		3			1	9
2	West Germany	31	2	3	3	4	6	9	11	11	11	13	16	17	17	20	20	22		24	26	29	31
2	(5) Gerd Riss	12	2					3					3					2	10				2
2	(6) Klaus Lausch	6		1			2							1			0		4		2
2	(7) Karl Maier	11				1			2			2				3			8			3
2	(8) Tommy Dunker	0			0					0	-				0				0	-
2	(18) Hans Faltermaier	2									0								0	2
3	Czechoslovakia	22	1	1	2	2	3	3	3	6	7	8	9	11	13	13	15	18		18	18	19	22
3	(1) Roman Matoušek	11				0				3				2				3	8				3
3	(2) Antonín Kasper Jr.	5			1				0				1				2		4			1
3	(3) Lubomír Jedek	0		0				0				-			-				0	-
3	(4) Petr Vandírek	3	1				1				1					0			3		F
3	(17) Bohumil Brhel	3										1			2				3	F
4	Poland	14	0	2	4	6	6	7	8	9	11	11	11	11	12	13	14	14		14	14	14	14
4	(13) Andrzej Huszcza	5		2					1		2							0	5				0
4	(14) Piotr Świst	1	0							-		0					1		1	-
4	(15) Roman Jankowski	4			2			1						0		1			4			0
4	(16) Zenon Kasprzak	2				2	0						0		-				2		F
4	(20) Eugeniusz Skupien	2								1					1				2	E
Placing	Team / Rider name	Total	1	2	3	4	5	6	7	8	9	10	11	12	13	14	15	16	Pts	17	18	19	20

M - exclusion for exceeding two-minute time allowance • T - exclusion for touching the tapes • X - other exclusion • E - retired or mechanical failure • F - fell

Helmet colours were permanent for each team (Red, Blue, White and Yellow/Black). Colours in diagrams indicate gate positions:
gate A – inside	gate B	gate C	gate D – outside

- Sweden to World Final

== World Final ==
- 10 September 1988
- (United States) Long Beach, Veterans Memorial Stadium

Placing	Team / Rider name	Total	1	2	3	4	5	6	7	8	9	10	11	12	13	14	15	16	Pts	17	18	19	20
1	Denmark	44	2	3	6	9	10	13	16	19	20	23	26	29	30	33	36	39		40	42	44	44
1	(1) Hans Nielsen	14				3				3				3				3	12			2
1	(2) Jan O. Pedersen	12			3				3				3				3		12				-
1	(3) Erik Gundersen	8		1				3				3			1				8		-
1	(4) Tommy Knudsen	8	2				1				1					3			7	1
1	(17) John Jørgensen	2																	0		2		0
2	United States	32	1	4	4	5	7	9	11	13	16	16	16	18	20	21	21	23		26	26	29	32
2	(13) Sam Ermolenko	13		3					2		3							2	10				3
2	(14) Lance King	6	1							2		0					-		3	3
2	(15) Shawn Moran	8			F			2						2		1			5			3
2	(16) Kelly Moran	5				1	2						0		2				5		0
2	(20) Rick Miller	0															E		0
3	Sweden	22	3	3	5	5	8	9	10	11	11	12	13	14	14	14	16	17		17	20	20	22
3	(9) Per Jonsson	9			2		3					1						1	7				2
3	(10) Conny Ivarsson	0				0		-			F						-		0	-
3	(11) Tony Olsson	4		0						1			-			0			1		3
3	(12) Jimmy Nilsen	5	3						1					1	E				5			E
3	(19) Henrik Gustafsson	4						1					1				2		4	E
4	England	22	0	2	3	5	5	5	5	5	7	9	11	11	14	16	17	17		19	20	21	22
4	(5) Simon Wigg	0	0					0					-					0	0			-
4	(6) Simon Cross	3		2			0							0			-		2		1
4	(7) Kelvin Tatum	7				2			0			2				2			6				1
4	(8) Chris Morton	4			1					0	-				3				4	-
4	(18) Gary Havelock	8									2		2				1		5	2		1
Placing	Team / Rider name	Total	1	2	3	4	5	6	7	8	9	10	11	12	13	14	15	16	Pts	17	18	19	20

M - exclusion for exceeding two-minute time allowance • T - exclusion for touching the tapes • X - other exclusion • E - retired or mechanical failure • F - fell

Helmet colours were permanent for each team (Red, Blue, White and Yellow/Black). Colours in diagrams indicate gate positions:
gate A – inside	gate B	gate C	gate D – outside

== See also ==
- 1988 Individual Speedway World Championship
- 1988 Speedway World Pairs Championship
