= 1990 Individual Speedway World Championship =

World motorcycle speedway competition

Seasons
- ← 1989 1991 →

The 1990 Individual Speedway World Championship was the 45th edition of the official World Championship to determine the world champion rider.

The final was held at the Odsal Stadium in Bradford, England. It was the 28th and last time the world final would be held in England under the traditional single meeting format.

Sweden's Per Jonsson won his only World Individual Championship to become the first Swedish World Champion since Anders Michanek in 1974 and became the first rider to win both the Under-21 and Senior World Championships, having previously won the 1985 Under-21 World Championship. Jonsson defeated Shawn Moran from the United States in a run-off after both finished the meeting on 13 points. Moran was later disqualified by the FIM for failing a drug test taken at the Overseas Final. After Moran's disqualification, the FIM did not adjust the rankings, leaving the second-place position vacant in official records for the 1990 World Final. Australian youngster Todd Wiltshire, believed by many judges to be one who would be making up the numbers in his first World Final, finished third with 12 points after winning his first two rides.

After having won each World Final since 1984, including five 1-2 finishes and taking all podium places in 1988, the 1990 World Final saw no Danish riders finishing on the podium for the first time since 1983. Defending champion Hans Nielsen, the only Danish rider in the field after Jan O. Pedersen was sidelined due to injury, finished fourth with 11 points.

== First round ==
=== British qualifiers ===
- Top 32 to British-Semi finals

== Second round ==
=== New Zealand qualification ===
- First 16 to New Zealand final

Date	Championship	Venue	Winner	2nd	3rd
Jan	South Island Final	Ruapuna Speedway, Christchurch	Mark Thorpe+	Larry Ross	David Bargh
??	North Island Final	Meeanee Speedway, Napier	Craig Wilkie	Gary Allan	??

- +Thorpe awarded title after Ross refused to ride in the race-off

=== Australian qualification ===
- Top 16 to Australian final

Date	Championship	Venue	Winner	2nd	3rd
??	Northern Territory	Northline Speedway, Darwin	Glen Baxter	??	??
??	Victorian	Myrtleford Speedway, Myrtleford	Leigh Adams	Phil Crump	??
??	New South Wales	Newcastle Motordrome, Tomago	Todd Wiltshire	Craig Boyce	Stephen Davies
??	South Australian	North Arm Speedway, Gillman	Scott Norman	Shane Parker	??
??	Queensland	Townsville Speedway, Townsville	Troy Butler	??	??
??	Western Australian	Claremont Speedway, Perth	Glenn Doyle	Glyn Taylor	David Cheshire

=== British semi-finals ===
- Top 16 to British final

== Third round ==
=== Continental preliminary round ===
- Riders progress to Continental quarter-finals

Date	Venue	Winner	2nd	3rd
5 May	(Poland) Arena Częstochowa, Częstochowa	(Poland) Jacek Woźniak	(West Germany) Tommy Dunker	(Poland) Jacek Rempała
6 May	(West Germany) Anton Treffer Stadion, Neustadt	(West Germany) Alois Bachhuber	(Czechoslovakia) Lubomir Jedek	(Czechoslovakia) Jan Schinagl
6 May	(Soviet Union) Rivne Speedway Stadium, Rivne	(Soviet Union) Igor Marko	(Poland) Piotr Świst	(Hungary) Laszlo Bodi
6 May	(Socialist Federal Republic of Yugoslavia) Ilirija Sports Park, Ljubljana	(Italy) Valentino Furlanetto	(Czechoslovakia) Vladimir Kalina	(Poland) Maciej Jaworek

=== Swedish qualification ===
- Top 8 in each heat to Swedish final

(29 April, Målilla Motorstadion, Målilla)
Pos	Rider	Points
1	Per Jonsson	13
2	Henrik Gustafsson	13
3	Dennis Löfqvist	12
4	Claes Ivarsson	12
5	Erik Stenlund	9
6	Tony Rickardsson	9
7	Mikael Teurnberg	8
8	Stefan Dannö	8
9	Kenneth Nyström	9
10	Jörgen Johansson	7
11	Christer Jonsson	6
12	Mikael Löfqvist	5
13	Tomas Karlsson	4
14	John Jensen	3
15	Jan Bergqvist	3
16	Pierre Carlsson	1

(29 April, Gamla Galgberget, Visby)
Pos	Rider	Points
1	Jimmy Nilsen	14
2	Tony Olsson	13
3	Niklas Karlsson	11
4	Mikael Ritterwall	11
5	Conny Ivarsson	10
6	Peter Nahlin	10
7	Kenneth Lindby	10
8	Christer Rohlén	9
9	Patrik Karlsson	8
10	Jimmy Engman	7
11	Tommy Nilsson	4
12	Tony Samuelsson	4
13	Raymond Smedh	4
14	Kent Rickardsson	2
15	Kari Virta	2
16	Joakim Messing	0

=== British final ===
- Top 10 to Commonwealth final

=== New Zealand final ===
(New Zealand) Ruapuna Speedway, Christchurch

- 3 February, top 2 to Commonwealth final

Pos.	Rider	Pts
1	Larry Ross	14+3
2	Mark Thorpe	14+2
3	Craig Wilkie	14+1
4	James Martin	11
5	Justin Monk	10
6	Michael Long	9
7	Stephen Rose	8
8	Darrin Wilson	8
9	Mark Jamieson	8
10	Max Brown	5
11	Philip Barakat	4
12	Kenny Webley	3
13	Alan Mason	2
14	Rhys Hamburger	3
15	Greg Fisher	2
16	Gary Marsh	0
17	Trevor Chapman	0
18	John Tuffley	0

=== Australian final ===
(Australia) Brisbane Exhibition Ground

- 13 January, top 3 (+1 other seeded) to Commonwealth final

Pos.	Rider	Pts
1	Glenn Doyle	14+3
2	Leigh Adams	14+2
3	Stephen Davies	13
4	Phil Crump	12
5	Shane Bowes	10
6	Mick Poole	9
7	Jamie Fagg	8
8	Glen Baxter	7
9	Steve Regeling	6
10	Steve Langdon	5
11	Shane Parker	5
12	Sean Willmott	4
13	Scott Norman	4
14	Troy Butler	4
15	Chris Watson	2
16	Glyn Taylor	1
17	Darren Winkler (res)	1

== Fourth round ==
=== Continental quarter-finals ===
- Top 32 to Continental semi-finals

Date	Venue	Winner	2nd	3rd
3 June	(Poland) Municipal Stadium, Rzeszów	(Poland) Ryszard Dołomisiewicz	(Hungary) Jozsef Petrikovics	(Poland) Jan Krzystyniak
3 June	(Austria) Speedway Natschbach Loipersbach	(Hungary) Antal Kocso	(Czechoslovakia) Zdenek Tesar	(Austria) Heinrich Schatzer
3 June	(Hungary) Borsod Volán Stadion, Miskolc	(Hungary) Zoltan Hajdu	(Poland) Piotr Świst	(Soviet Union) Rif Saitgareev
4 June	(West Germany) Abensberger Stadion, Abensberg	(Hungary) Zoltan Adorjan	(Hungary) Sandor Tihanyi	(West Germany) Klaus Lausch

=== Danish Final ===
- Top 6 to the Nordic final

=== Norway Final ===
- (Norway) Frogner Speedway, Oslo
- 15 Sep 1989, top 1 (+1 seeded) to Nordic final 1990

Pos.	Rider	Points
1	Arnt Førland	12+3
2	Lars Gunnestad	12+2
3	Robert Langeland	12+1
4	Ingvar Skogland	12+0
5	Per Jörgensen	11
6	Arne Svensen	9
7	Jan Arid Slatta	9
8	Atle Knutsen	7
9	Einar Kyllingstad	6
10	Tor Einar Hielm	6
11	Odd Pettersen	5
12	Stag Bergersen	4
13	Jorn Arve Ardal	4
14	Jorn Vidar Aasen	4
15	Kjell Oyvind Sola	3
16	Gjermund Aas	2
17	Rolf Netland (res)	1

=== Finland Final ===
- (Finland) Kaanaa Speedway, Tampere
- 27 Aug 1989, top 2 to Nordic final 1990

Pos.	Rider	Total
1	Juha Moksunen	14
2	Olli Tyrvainen	13+3
3	Kai Niemi	13+2
4	Vesa Ylinen	11+3
5	Janne Moksunen	11+2
6	Ari Koponen	10
7	Jari Kortelainen	8
8	Seppo Keskinen	7
9	Tomi Havu	7
10	Aarre Soivuori	7
11	Roy Malminheimo	7
12	Petri Kokko	5
13	Pekka Eerikainen	2
14	Jarmo Makinen	2
15	Petri Nurmesniemi (res)	1
16	Mika Pellinen (res)	1
17	Janne Koivula (res)	1
18	Esa Reijo	0
19	Nicklas Finne	0

=== Swedish Final ===
- R1 (15 May, Vetlanda Motorstadion, Vetlanda)
- R2 (16 May, Norrköping Motorstadion, Norrköping)
- R3 (17 May, Avesta Motorstadion, Avesta)
- Top 6 to Nordic Final

Pos.	Rider	Scores	Total
1	Per Jonsson	12+13+13	38
2	Jimmy Nilsen	12+12+10	34
3	Dennis Löfqvist	9+12+13	34
4	Conny Ivarsson	3+9+11	33
5	Henka Gustafsson	9+11+13	33
6	Peter Nahlin	14+8+10	32
7	Niklas Karlsson	8+9+8	25
8	Tony Rickardsson	6+5+10	21
9	Peter Karlsson	8+6+6	20
10	Erik Stenlund	4+6+7	17
11	Claes Ivarsson	9+6+ns	15
12	Mikael Teurnberg	4+4+7	15
13	Mikael Ritterwall	6+6+2	14 14
14	Tony Olsson	5+5+ns	10
15	Kenneth Lindby	1+4+3	8
16	Stefan Dannö	0+2+4	6
17	Christer Rohlén (res)	ns+1+0	1

=== Commonwealth Final ===
- Top 12 plus 1 reserve to the Overseas final

=== North American Final ===
- 2 June 1990
- (United States) Veterans Memorial Stadium, Long Beach
- Top 4 to the Overseas final plus 1 reserve

Pos.	Rider	Total
1	Shawn Moran	18+3
2	Billy Hamill	18+2
3	Rick Miller	18+1
4	Greg Hancock	18+0
5	Ronnie Correy	16+3
6	Kelly Moran	16+2
7	Bobby Schwartz	14
8	Mike Faria	12
9	Robert Pfetzing	12
10	Lance King	11
11	Steve Lucero	8
12	Jim Sisemore	8
13	Josh Larsen	7
14	Brad Oxley	5
15	Tony Bienert	5
16	Charles Ermolenko	3
17	Eddie Castro	3
18	Shawn McConnell (res)	3
19	Sam Ermolenko	2
20	Don Odom (res)	2
21	John Kehoe	1
22	Fred Legault	0

== Fifth round ==
=== Continental semi-finals ===
- 23 June
- (Poland) Polonia Bydgoszcz Stadium, Bydgoszcz
- Top 8 to Continental final

Pos.	Rider	Points
1	(Czechoslovakia) Antonín Kasper Jr.	14
2	(Poland) Jan Krzystyniak	13
3	(Poland) Tomasz Gollob	12+3
4	(Czechoslovakia) Zdeněk Tesař	12+2
5	(Hungary) Antal Kocso	9
6	(Hungary) József Petrikovics	8
7	(Poland) Wojciech Zaluski	7+3
8	(Austria) Heinrich Schatzer	7+2
9	(Soviet Union) Igor Marko	7+1
10	(Czechoslovakia) Lubomir Jedek	6
11	(Hungary) Róbert Nagy	6
12	(Hungary) Laszlo Bodi	6
13	(Poland) Ryszard Dolomisiewicz	5
14	(Soviet Union) Vladimir Trofimov	5
15	(Austria) Walter Nebel	2
16	(Soviet Union) Viktor Gajdym	1

- 24 June
- (Czechoslovakia) Speedway Žarnovica, Žarnovica
- Top 8 to Continental final

Pos.	Rider	Points
1	(Hungary) Zoltán Adorján	15
2	(West Germany) Klaus Lausch	11+3
3	(Italy) Armando Castagna	11+2
4	(West Germany) Gerd Riss	11+1
5	(Hungary) Sandor Tihanyi	10
6	(Czechoslovakia) Roman Matoušek	9
7	(Czechoslovakia) Bohumil Brhel	9
8	(Czechoslovakia) Vladimir Kalina	9
9	(Czechoslovakia) Petr Vandírek	8
10	(West Germany) Andre Pollehn	7
11	(Soviet Union) Rif Saitgareev	7
12	(Hungary) Zoltan Hajdu	6
13	(Czechoslovakia) Pavel Karnas	3
14	(Hungary) Sandor Ujhelyi	2
15	(Austria) Robert Funk	1
16	(Hungary) Zsolt Böszermenyi	1

=== Overseas Final ===
- Top 9 to the Intercontinental final

=== Nordic Final ===
- 9 June 1990
- (Sweden) Motorstadium, Linköping
- Top 7 to the Intercontinental Final plus 1 reserve

Pos.	Rider	Total
1	(Denmark) Jan O. Pedersen	14
2	(Sweden) Per Jonsson	12
3	(Sweden) Henrik Gustafsson	11+3
4	(Sweden) Conny Ivarsson	11+2
5	(Sweden) Jimmy Nilsen	11+1
6	(Denmark) Hans Nielsen	11+0
7	(Sweden) Dennis Löfqvist	9+3
8	(Denmark) Brian Karger	9+2
9	(Finland) Kai Niemi	6
10	(Denmark) Bo Petersen	6
11	(Sweden) Peter Nahlin	5
12	(Norway) Einar Kyllingstad	5
13	(Denmark) Jens Henry Nielsen	3
14	(Finland) Olli Tyrväinen	2
15	(Norway) Arnt Førland	2
16	(Denmark) Jan Pedersen	2
17	(Finland) Vesa Ylinen (res)	1

== Sixth round ==
=== Intercontinental Final ===
- Top 11 plus 1 reserve to World final

=== Continental Final ===
- 12 August 1990
- (West Germany) Motodrom Halbemond, Norden
- Top 5 to the World final plus 1 reserve

Pos.	Rider	Heat Scores	Total
1	(West Germany) Gerd Riss	(3,2,2,3,3)	13
2	(Hungary) Zoltán Adorján	(2,3,1,3,3)	12+3
3	(Italy) Armando Castagna	(3,3,x,3,3)	12+2
4	(Czechoslovakia) Roman Matoušek	(3,1,3,2,2)	11
5	(Czechoslovakia) Zdeněk Tesař	(3,0,2,3,2)	10+3
6	(Czechoslovakia) Antonín Kasper Jr.	(1,3,3,2,1)	10+2
7	(Hungary) Sándor Tihanyi	(0,3,2,2,2)	9
8	(Poland) Wojciech Załuski	(2,1,F,1,3)	7
9	(Hungary) Antal Kocso	(2,2,2,0,1)	7
10	(West Germany) Klaus Lausch	(2,1,3,R,ns)	6
11	(Czechoslovakia) Bohumil Brhel	(1,2,EF,2,0)	5
12	(Czechoslovakia) Vladimir Kalina	(1,1,1,0,2)	5
13	(Hungary) József Petrikovics	(0,2,1,1,1)	5
14	(Poland) Tomasz Gollob	(0,0,3,1,0)	4
15	(Austria) Heinrich Schatzer	(1,0,0,1,1)	3
16	(Poland) Jan Krzystyniak	(0,0,1,0,0)	1

== World final ==
- 1 September 1990
- (England) Odsal Stadium, Bradford

=== Classification ===
Placing	Rider	Total	1	2	3	4	5	6	7	8	9	10	11	12	13	14	15	16	17	18	19	20	Pts	Pos
1	(Sweden) (9) Per Jonsson	13+3			3		3						2					2		3			13	1
2	(United States) (15) Shawn Moran	13+2				1			3			3						3	3				13	2
3	(Australia) (6) Todd Wiltshire	12		3				3			2							1			3		12	3
4	(Denmark) (1) Hans Nielsen	11	3				1				3				2				2				11	4
5	(Sweden) (12) Jimmy Nilsen	10			2					1		2			3						2		10	5
6	(Sweden) (13) Henrik Gustafsson	9				3	2							3		0					1		9	6
7	(England) (16) Kelvin Tatum	9				2				3	0						3			1			9	7
8	(Italy) (2) Armando Castagna	8	0					2				1				3				2			8	8
9	(United States) (8) Rick Miller	8		2						2			3			1			-				8	9
10	(England) (11) Richard Knight	7			1				2		1					2						1	7	10
11	(England) (4) Martin Dugard	6	2							0				1				0				3	6	11
12	(Czechoslovakia) (5) Roman Matoušek	5		1			-					0					2					2	5	12
13	(Czechoslovakia) (10) Zdeněk Tesař	2			0			0						2			0		0				2	13
14	(United States) (7) Ronnie Correy	2		0					1					0	1					0			2	14
15	(Czechoslovakia) (14) Antonín Kasper Jr.	2				0		1					1		0							0	2	15
16	(Hungary) (3) Zoltán Adorján	2	1						-				0				1				0		2	16
	(Hungary) (17) Sándor Tihanyi	0																					0	
	(Sweden) (18) Dennis Löfqvist	0																					0	
Placing	Rider	Total	1	2	3	4	5	6	7	8	9	10	11	12	13	14	15	16	17	18	19	20	Pts	Pos

m - exclusion for exceeding two minute time allowance • t - exclusion for touching the tapes • x - other exclusion • e - retired or mechanical failure • f - fell • ns - non-starter • nc - non-classify

gate A - inside	gate B	gate C	gate D - outside

Pos.	Rider	Heat Scores	Total
1	(Sweden) Per Jonsson	(3,3,2,2,3)	13+3
2	(United States) Shawn Moran^{a}	(1,3,3,3,3)	13+2
3	(Australia) Todd Wiltshire	(3,3,2,1,3)	12
4	(Denmark) Hans Nielsen	(3,1,3,2,2)	11
5	(Sweden) Jimmy Nilsen	(2,1,2,3,2)	10
6	(Sweden) Henrik Gustafsson*	(3,2,3,0,1)	9
7	(England) Kelvin Tatum	(2,3,0,3,1)	9
8	(Italy) Armando Castagna	(F,2,1,3,2)	8
9	(United States) Rick Miller	(2,2,3,1,x)	8
10	(England) Richard Knight	(1,2,1,2,1)	7
11	(England) Martin Dugard	(2,0,1,0,3)	6
12	(Czechoslovakia) Roman Matoušek	(1,R,0,2,2)	5
13	(Czechoslovakia) Zdeněk Tesař	(0,0,2,0,R)	2
14	(United States) Ronnie Correy	(1,0,x,1,0)	2
15	(Hungary) Zoltán Adorján	(1,R,0,1,0)	2
16	(Czechoslovakia) Antonín Kasper Jr.*	(0,1,1,0,0)	2
Res	(Hungary) Sándor Tihanyi	did not ride	-
Res	(Sweden) Dennis Löfqvist	did not ride	-

* Henrik Gustafsson and Antonín Kasper Jr. replaced injured qualifiers Jan O. Pedersen and Gerd Riss

Notes:

a. Shawn Moran scored 13 points and lost the run-off to Per Jonsson. However, Moran had failed a random drug and alcohol test taken three months earlier at the Overseas Final, and was subsequently disqualified from second place. The FIM did not upgrade the standings and the official records show no second place rider.
