= 1987 Speedway World Team Cup =

28th edition of the annual motorcycle speedway World Cup competition

Seasons
- ← 1986 1988 →

The 1987 Speedway World Team Cup was the 28th edition of the FIM Speedway World Team Cup to determine the team world champions.

Denmark won two legs and therefore won their fifth consecutive title (and seventh in total) moving to just one title win if England's record 8. It was also Hans Nielsen's seventh gold medal having taken part in all of Denmark's title wins.

== Group 4 ==
Day	Venue	Winner
Teams ranked 13–16
19 June	(Netherlands) Amsterdam	Bulgaria
13 September	(Norway) Skien	Bulgaria
27 September	(Socialist Federal Republic of Yugoslavia) Ljubljana	Bulgaria
3 October	(Bulgaria) Shumen	Bulgaria

- Winner promoted to Group C in 1988

Round 1

- 19 June 1987
- (Netherlands) Olympic Stadium, Amsterdam

First	Second	Third	Fourth
Bulgaria - 38+3	Netherlands - 38+2	Norway - 34	Yugoslavia - 4

Round 2

- 13 September 1987
- (Norway) Geiteryggen Speedwaybane, Skien

First	Second	Third	Fourth
Bulgaria - 42	Norway - 40	Netherlands - 28	Yugoslavia - 10

Round 3

- 27 September 1987
- (Socialist Federal Republic of Yugoslavia) Ilirija Sports Park, Ljubljana

First	Second	Third	Fourth
Bulgaria - 43	Norway - 31	Netherlands - 24	Yugoslavia - 20

Round 4

- 3 October 1987
- (Bulgaria) Shumen Motopista, Shumen

First	Second	Third	Fourth
Bulgaria - 42	Norway - 40	Netherlands - 27	Yugoslavia - 11

== Group 3 ==
Day	Venue	Winner
Teams ranked 9–12
3 May	(Italy) Lonigo	Hungary
21 June	(Austria) Wiener Neustadt	Hungary
11 July	(West Germany) Landshut	Italy
13 September	(Hungary) Miskolc	West Germany

- Winner promoted to Group B in 1988; 4th relegated to Group D in 1988

Round 1

- 3 May 1987
- (Italy) Santa Marina Stadium, Lonigo

First	Second	Third	Fourth
Hungary - 41; Janosh Balogh - 13; József Petrikovics - 11; Zoltán Adorján - 10; Sándor Tihanyi - 5 Antal Kocso - 2	Italy - 32; Armando Castagna - 9 Valentino Furlanetto - 9 Paolo Salvatelli - 8 Armando Dal Chiele - 5 Ottoviano Righetto - 1	West Germany - 32; Karl Maier - 11; Hans Faltermeier - 9 Gerd Riss - 8 Michael Datzmann - 4	Austria - 15; Walter Nebel - 7 Siegfried Eder - 4 Heinrich Schatzer - 2 Adi Funk - 2 Toni Pilotto - 0

Round 2

- 21 June 1987
- (Austria) Stadion Wiener Neustadt, Wiener Neustadt

First	Second	Third	Fourth
Hungary - 40; Zoltán Adorján - 14; József Petrikovics - 12; Antal Kocso - 10; Janosh Balogh - 4 Sándor Tihanyi - 0	Italy - 36; Armando Dal Chiele - 11; Valentino Furlanetto - 10; Paolo Salvatelli - 8 Armando Castagna - 7 Gianni Famari - 0	West Germany - 34; Karl Maier - 10; Gerd Riss - 8 Michael Datzmann - 8 Klaus Lausch - 7 Hans Faltermeier - 1	Austria - 9 Toni Pilotto - 5 Walter Nebel - 2 Adi Funk - 2 Heinrich Schatzer - 0 Siegfried Eder - 0

Round 3

- 11 July 1987
- (West Germany) Ellermühle Speedway Stadium, Landshut

First	Second	Third	Fourth
Italy - 43+3; Armando Castagna - 13+3; Paolo Salvatelli - 12; Giorgio Zaramella - 12; Gianni Famari - 6	West Germany - 43+2; Klaus Lausch - 14+2; Karl Maier - 12; Gerd Riss - 9 Michael Datzmann - 5 Hans Faltermeier - 3	Austria - 18; Heinrich Schatzer - 6 Toni Pilotto - 5 Walter Nebel - 4 Adi Funk - 2 Andreas Bössner - 1	Hungary - 16; Zoltán Adorján - 7 Antal Kocso - 5 József Petrikovics - 3 Sándor Tihanyi - 1 Janosh Balogh - 0

Round 4

- 13 September 1987
- (Hungary) Borsod Volán Stadion, Miskolc

First	Second	Third	Fourth
West Germany - 40; Gerd Riss - 12; Hans Faltermeier - 10; Tommy Dunker - 10; Karl Maier - 8	Hungary - 37; Zoltán Adorján - 12; Sándor Tihanyi - 11; Antal Kocso - 7 Janos Szeres - 4 Laszlo Bodi - 3	Italy - 25; Armando Castagna - 8 Giorgio Zaramella - 6 Gianni Famari - 5 Paolo Salvatelli - 3 Fabrizio Vesprini - 3	Austria - 14; Heinrich Schatzer - 5 Walter Nebel - 3 Toni Pilotto - 2 Adi Funk - 2 Andreas Bössner - 2

Group 2

Day	Venue	Winner
Teams ranked 5–8
19 July	(Poland) Gdańsk	Sweden
21 August	(Sweden) Linköping	Sweden
13 September	(Poland) Rybnik	Poland

- Winner promoted to Group A in 1988; 4th relegated to Group C in 1988

Round 1

- 19 July 1987
- (Poland) Gdańsk Speedway Stadium, Gdańsk

First	Second	Third	Fourth
Sweden - 41; Per Jonsson (3,3,3,3,3) - 15; Jimmy Nilsen (3,3,3,1,3) - 13; Roland Dannö (3,1,0,1,2) - 7 Conny Ivarsson (2,-,-,-,-) - 2 Tommy Nilsson (-,0,3,1,0) - 4	Poland - 39; Andrzej Huszcza (2,3,2,3,3) - 13; Roman Jankowski (3,3,2,2,2) - 12; Zenon Kasprzak (2,E,1,2,3) - 8 Wojciech Żabiałowicz (2,1,3,0,-) - 6 Grzegorz Dzikowski (-,-,-,-,0) - 0	Australia - 27; Steve Regeling (2,2,3,1,1) - 9 Steve Baker (1,2,2,3,1) - 9 Stephen Davies (1,1,2,2,1) - 7 Glenn Doyle (2,0,-,-,-) - 2 Alan Rivett (-,-,0,0,0) - 0	Finland - 13; Ari Koponen (2,2,1,0,0) - 5 Olli Tyrväinen (1,1,1,0,2) - 5 Kai Niemi (1,E,0,-,-) - 1 Aki Ala-Riihimaki (0,1,-,-,-) - 1 Vesa Ylinen (-,-,0,0/0,1/0) - 1

Round 2

- 21 August 1987
- (Sweden) Linköping Motorstadion, Linköping

First	Second	Third	Fourth
Sweden - 50; Per Jonsson - 15; Tony Olsson - 13; Conny Ivarsson - 13; Jimmy Nilsen - 6 Mikael Blixt - 3	Finland - 32; Kai Niemi - 11; Ari Koponen - 8 Roy Malminheimo - 7 Juha Moksunen - 6 Janne Moksunen - 0	Australia - 27; Steve Regeling - 8 Stephen Davies - 8 Steve Baker - 6 Mick Poole - 5	Poland - 10; Roman Jankowski - 5 Zenon Kasprzak - 2 Ryszard Dołomisiewicz - 2 Andrzej Huszcza - 1 Janusz Stachyra - 0

Round 3

- 13 September 1987
- (Poland) Rybnik Municipal Stadium, Rybnik

First	Second	Third	Fourth
Poland - 36; Ryszard Dołomisiewicz - 10; Roman Jankowski - 9 Piotr Świst - 8 Zenon Kasprzak - 6 Andrzej Huszcza - 3	Sweden - 33; Per Jonsson - 11; Jimmy Nilsen - 11; Tony Olsson - 8 Conny Ivarsson - 3 Erik Stenlund - 0	Australia - 28; Steve Regeling - 8 Steve Baker - 8 Stephen Davies - 7 Troy Butler - 5 Glenn Doyle - 0	Finland - 23; Kai Niemi - 11; Ari Koponen - 9 Janne Moksunen - 2 Roy Malminheimo - 1 Juha Moksunen - 0

== World final group ==
Day	Venue	Winner
Teams ranked 1–4
16 August	(Denmark) Fredericia	Denmark
25 August	(England) Coventry	(United States) USA
13 September	(Czechoslovakia) Prague	Denmark

- 4th relegated to Group B in 1988

=== Round 1 ===
- 16 August 1987
- (Denmark) Fredericia Speedway Center, Fredericia
- Att: 5,000
- Ref: Christer Bergstrom (Sw)

Placing	Team / Rider name	Total	1	2	3	4	5	6	7	8	9	10	11	12	13	14	15	16	Pts	17	18	19	20
1	Denmark	47	2	4	7	10	12	15	18	21	24	27	30	33	34	36	37	40		41	44	44	47
1	(1) Hans Nielsen	15				3				3				3				3	12				3
1	(2) Erik Gundersen	10			3				3				3				1		10			0
1	(3) Jan O. Pedersen	12		2				3				3			1				9		3
1	(4) Tommy Knudsen	10	2				2				3					2			9	1
1	(17) John Jørgensen	0																	0
2	England	37	1	4	5	6	9	9	10	12	13	15	17	19	22	25	28	30		32	34	35	37
2	(5) Kelvin Tatum	7	1					0					2					2	5	2
2	(6) Jeremy Doncaster	13		3			3							2			3		11				2
2	(7) Simon Cross	8				1			1			2				3			7			1
2	(8) Simon Wigg	9			1					2	1				3				7		2
2	(18) Marvyn Cox	0																	0
3	United States	24	3	3	3	3	4	6	8	9	11	11	12	12	14	15	17	17		20	20	23	24
3	(9) Shawn Moran	4			0		1					0						0	1	3
3	(10) Sam Ermolenko	9				0		2			2						2		6			3
3	(11) Lance King	3		0						1			1			1			3		0
3	(12) Rick Miller	8	3						2					0	2				7				1
3	(19) Ronnie Correy	0																	0
4	Czechoslovakia	12	0	1	3	5	5	6	6	6	6	7	7	8	8	8	8	9		9	10	12	12
4	(13) Roman Matoušek	3		1					F		0							1	2		1
4	(14) Petr Vandírek	1	0							-		1					0		1	-
4	(15) Lubomír Jedek	4			2			1						1		0			4				0
4	(16) Antonín Kasper Jr.	4				2	0						0		0				2			2
4	(20) Zdeněk Schneiderwind	0								0									0	0
Placing	Team / Rider name	Total	1	2	3	4	5	6	7	8	9	10	11	12	13	14	15	16	Pts	17	18	19	20

M - exclusion for exceeding two-minute time allowance • T - exclusion for touching the tapes • X - other exclusion • E - retired or mechanical failure • F - fell

Helmet colours were permanent for each team (Red, Blue, White and Yellow/Black). Colours in diagrams indicate gate positions:
gate A – inside	gate B	gate C	gate D – outside

=== Round 2 ===
- 25 August 25, 1987
- (England) Brandon Stadium, Coventry
- Ref: Graham Brodie (Eng)

Placing	Team / Rider name	Total	1	2	3	4	5	6	7	8	9	10	11	12	13	14	15	16	Pts	17	18	19	20
1	United States	43	1	4	7	8	11	13	16	19	22	23	25	28	29	29	32	35		36	38	41	43
1	(13) Shawn Moran	14		3					3		3							3	12				2
1	(14) Lance King	5	1							3		1					-		5	-
1	(15) Sam Ermolenko	11			3			2						3		F			8			3
1	(16) Rick Miller	9				1	3						2		1				7		2
1	(20) Kelly Moran	4															3		3	1
2	Denmark	37	3	5	7	9	9	12	14	15	16	19	22	24	27	30	32	34		37	37	37	37
2	(5) Hans Nielsen	11	3					3					3					2	11				X
2	(6) Erik Gundersen	9		2			0							2			2		6	3
2	(7) Jan O. Pedersen	10				2			2			3				3			10			0
2	(8) Tommy Knudsen	7			2					1	1				3				7		0
2	(18) John Jørgensen	0																	0
3	England	33	2	3	4	7	9	10	11	13	15	17	18	19	19	21	22	23		25	28	30	33
3	(1) Kelvin Tatum	9				3				2				1				1	7			2
3	(2) Jeremy Doncaster	6			1				1				-				1		3		3
3	(3) Marvyn Cox	2		1				1				-			0				2	-
3	(4) Simon Wigg	11	2				2				2					2			8				3
3	(17) Simon Cross	5										2	1						3	2
4	Czechoslovakia	7	0	0	0	0	1	1	1	1	1	1	1	1	3	4	4	4		4	5	6	7
4	(9) Roman Matoušek	2			0		1					F						0	1			1
4	(10) Petr Vandírek	1				0		0			-						0		0		1
4	(11) Lubomír Jedek	0		0						0			0			-			0	0
4	(12) Antonín Kasper Jr.	3	0						0					0	2				2				1
4	(19) Zdeněk Schneiderwind	1									0					1			1
Placing	Team / Rider name	Total	1	2	3	4	5	6	7	8	9	10	11	12	13	14	15	16	Pts	17	18	19	20

M - exclusion for exceeding two-minute time allowance • T - exclusion for touching the tapes • X - other exclusion • E - retired or mechanical failure • F - fell

Helmet colours were permanent for each team (Red, Blue, White and Yellow/Black). Colours in diagrams indicate gate positions:
gate A – inside	gate B	gate C	gate D – outside

=== Round 3 ===
- 13 September 1987
- (Czechoslovakia) Marketa Stadium, Prague
- Att: 12,000

Placing	Team / Rider name	Total	1	2	3	4	5	6	7	8	9	10	11	12	13	14	15	16	Pts	17	18	19	20
1	Denmark	46	3	6	8	11	12	15	15	18	21	24	27	28	30	31	34	37		40	41	44	46
1	(13) Hans Nielsen	12		3					E		3							3	9			3
1	(14) Erik Gundersen	14	3							3		3					3		12				2
1	(15) Jan O. Pedersen	10			2			3						1		1			7	3
1	(16) Tommy Knudsen	10				3	1						3		2				9		1
1	(20) John Jørgensen	0																	0
2	England	31	2	4	7	9	9	11	13	15	15	17	18	21	22	22	24	26		26	29	31	31
2	(9) Simon Wigg	9			3		0					2						2	7			2
2	(10) Kelvin Tatum	9				2		2			0						2		6		3
2	(11) Jeremy Doncaster	5		2						2			1			0			5	-
2	(12) Simon Cross	8	2						2					3	1				8				0
2	(19) Marvyn Cox	0																	0	0
3	United States	26	0	1	1	2	5	6	9	10	11	12	14	14	17	19	20	20		22	22	23	26
3	(5) Shawn Moran	5	0					1					2					0	3	2
3	(6) John Cook	6		1			3							0			1		5			1
3	(7) Kelly Moran	10				1			3			1				2			7				3
3	(8) Rick Miller	5			0					1	1				3				5		0
3	(18) -	0																	0
4	Czechoslovakia	17	1	1	2	2	4	4	5	5	7	7	7	9	9	12	12	13		14	16	16	17
4	(1) Antonín Kasper Jr.	3				0				0				-				1	1		2
4	(2) Petr Vandírek	2			1				1				0				0		2			0
4	(3) Lubomír Jedek	0		0				0				0			-				0	-
4	(4) Roman Matoušek	9	1				2				2					3			8				1
4	(17) Zdeněk Schneiderwind	3												2	0				2	1
Placing	Team / Rider name	Total	1	2	3	4	5	6	7	8	9	10	11	12	13	14	15	16	Pts	17	18	19	20

M - exclusion for exceeding two-minute time allowance • T - exclusion for touching the tapes • X - other exclusion • E - retired or mechanical failure • F - fell

Helmet colours were permanent for each team (Red, Blue, White and Yellow/Black). Colours in diagrams indicate gate positions:
gate A – inside	gate B	gate C	gate D – outside

=== Final standings ===
Pos	Team	1st	2nd	3rd	4th	Pts
1	Denmark	2	1	0	0	8
2	England	0	2	1	0	5
3	United States	1	0	2	0	5
4	Czechoslovakia	0	0	0	3	0

== See also ==
- 1987 Individual Speedway World Championship
- 1987 Speedway World Pairs Championship
