= 1992 Individual Speedway World Championship =

Motorcycle speedway world championship season

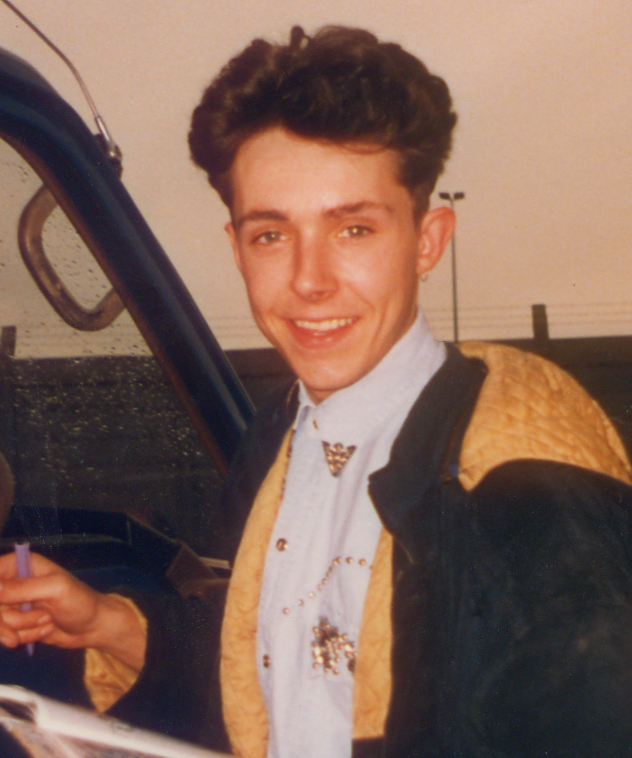
- Gary Havelock (champion)
- Venue: Olympic Stadium
- Location: Wrocław, Poland
- End date: 29 August 1992

The 1992 Individual Speedway World Championship was the 47th edition of the official World Championship to determine the world champion rider.

Gary Havelock scored 14 points to become England's first Speedway World Champion since Michael Lee in 1980. Sweden's Per Jonsson, the 1990 World Champion, finished second with 11 points with Denmark's Gert Handberg third on 10 points.

Triple World Champion Hans Nielsen failed to qualify for a World Final for the first time since 1979 after only finishing 12th in the Nordic Final.

== First round ==
=== British qualifiers ===
- Top 32 to British-Semi finals

== Second round ==
=== British semi-finals ===
- Top 16 to British final

=== Australian qualification ===
Date	Championship	Venue	Winner
?	Northern Territory	?	?
?	Queensland	Brisbane Exhibition Ground	Troy Butler
?	Victorian	Olympic Park, Mildura	Leigh Adams
?	New South Wales	Nepean Speedway, Sydney	Mick Poole
?	Western Australian	Collie Speedway, Collie	Glenn Doyle
?	South Australian	North Arm Speedway, Gillman	Craig Hodgson

=== New Zealand qualification ===
Date	Championship	Venue	Winner	2nd	3rd
14 Dec '91	South Island Final	Ruapuna Speedway, Christchurch	Mark Thorpe	Mark Jamieson	Justin Monk
??	North Island Final	Waikaraka Park, Auckland	??	??	??

== Third round ==
=== Continental preliminary round ===
- Riders progress to Continental quarter-finals

Date	Venue	Winner	2nd	3rd
26 Apr	(Socialist Federal Republic of Yugoslavia) Matija Gubec Stadium, Krško	(Austria) Andreas Bössner	(Russia) Igor Dubinin	(Italy) Armando Dal Chiele
26 Apr	(Germany) Speedwaystadion, Ludwigslust	(Poland) Mirosław Kowalik	(France) Philippe Bergé	(Czechoslovakia) Pavel Karnas
26 Apr	(Hungary) Volán Sporttelep, Nyiregyhaza	(Hungary) Sandor Tihanyi	(Hungary) Laszlo Bodi	(Poland) Jacek Woźniak
26 Apr	(Austria) Sportplatz St. Johann, St.Johann/Pg	(Estonia) Rene Aas	(Austria) Toni Pilotto	(Czechoslovakia) Borivoj Hadek

=== Swedish qualification ===
- Top 8 in each heat to Swedish final

(9 May, Kumla Motorstadion, Kumla)
Pos	Rider	Points
1	Kenneth Lindby	12
2	Henrik Gustafsson	12
3	Jimmy Nilsen	11
4	Christer Rohlén	10
5	Tony Olsson	10
6	Erik Stenlund	9
7	Patrik Olsson	8
8	Mikael Ritterwall	8
9	Joakim Karlsson	7
10	Claes Ivarsson	7
11	Lillebror Johansson	7
12	Peter Karlsson	7
13	Mikael Teurnberg	5
14	Magnus Oscarsson	4
15	Jimmy Engman	1
16	Stefan Lardner	1
17	Peter Johansson (res)	1
18	Kent Rickardsson (res)	0

(9 May, Vetlanda Motorstadion, Vetlanda)
Pos	Rider	Points
1	Per Jonsson	12
2	Conny Ivarsson	12
3	Tony Rickardsson	11
4	Jörgen Johansson	11
5	Niklas Karlsson	11
6	Stefan Dannö	10
7	Peter Nahlin	9
8	Dennis Löfqvist	8
9	Patrik Karlsson	6
10	Mikael Karlsson	6
11	Tommy Lindgren	5
12	Niklas Klingberg	5
13	Stefan Andersson	5
14	Jörgen Hultgren	5
15	Niklas Johansson	4
16	Göran Flood	1

=== Australian Final ===
- First 4 to Commonwealth final plus 1 reserve

=== British Final ===
- Top 10 to Commonwealth final plus 1 reserve

=== New Zealand Final ===
- (New Zealand) Meeanee Speedway, Napier
- 25 January, First (+Mitch Shirra seeded) to Commonwealth final

Pos.	Rider	Total
1	Gary Allan	15
2	Mark Thorpe	14
3	Paul Atkins	11
4	Chris Martin	10
5	John Roberts	9
6	Mark Jamieson	9
7	Trevor Chapman	9
8	Mike Wilson	9
9	Steve Mudgeway	6
10	Barry Free	6
11	Dean Sullivan	6
12	Glen Sole	5
13	Robbie Price	4
14	Rhys Hamburger	3
15	Ricky Meehan (res)	2
16	Dean Ornsby	0
17	Justin Monk	0

== Fourth round ==
=== Continental quarter-finals ===
- Top 32 to Continental semi-finals

Date	Venue	Winner	2nd	3rd
24 May	(Germany) Paul Greifzu Stadium, Stralsund	(Hungary) Sandor Tihanyi	(Czechoslovakia) Antonín Kasper Jr.	(Hungary) Laszlo Bodi
24 May	(Poland) Speedway Stadium, Zielona Góra	(Hungary) Zoltán Adorján	(Poland) Andrzej Huszcza	(Czechoslovakia) Roman Matousek
24 May	(Czechoslovakia) Speedway Žarnovica, Žarnovica	(Czechoslovakia) Bohumil Brhel	(Poland) Tomasz Gollob	(Hungary) Jozsef Petrikovics
24 May	(Germany) Anton Treffer Stadion, Neustadt	(Germany) Gerd Riss	(Hungary) Antal Kocso	(Russia) Oleg Kurguskin

=== Swedish Final ===
- (Sweden) 3 Rounds, first 4 to Nordic final plus 1 reserve
- Henrik Gustafsson seeded to Nordic final
- R1 (19 May, Målilla Motorstadion, Målilla)
- R2 (20 May, Tallhult Motorstadion, Hagfors)
- R3 (21 May, Örebro Motorstadion, Örebro)

Pos.	Rider	Scores	Total
1	Per Jonsson	14+14+10	38
2	Jimmy Nilsen	11+13+12	36
3	Tony Rickardsson	13+10+12	35
4	Peter Nahlin	10+12+13	35
5	Jörgen Johansson	9+9+9	27
6	Conny Ivarsson	9+5+11	25
7	Christer Rohlén	6+10+7	23
8	Niklas Karlsson	5+11+6	22
9	Dennis Löfqvist	5+7+9	21
10	Tony Olsson	8+3+9	20
11	Erik Stenlund	9+6+5	20
12	Kenneth Lindby	8+5+2	15
13	Mikael Ritterwall	6+1+5	12
14	Stefan Dannö	3+8+0	11
15	Joakim Karlsson	0+4+5	9
16	Patrik Olsson	4+2+2	8

=== Finland Final ===
- (Finland) Yyterin speedwaystadion, Pori
- 18 Aug '91, top 2 to Nordic final

Pos.	Rider	Total
1	Vesa Ylinen	14+3
2	Juha Moksunen	14+2
3	Mika Pellinen	13
4	Aki Ala Riihimäki	10
5	Petri Nurmesniemi	9
6	Tomi Havu	8
7	Janne Koivula	8
8	Arto Orjo	7
9	Janne Moksunen	7
10	Marko Hyyryläinen	7
11	Petri Vaatsio	6
12	Aarre Soivuori	5
13	Niklas Finne	4
14	Petri Kokko	3
15	Jari Kortelainen	3
16	Roy Malminheimo	1
17	Jounko Jarvi (res)	1

=== Norwegian qualifying ===
- (Norway) Einar Kyllingstad & Lars Gunnestad to Nordic final

=== Danish Final ===
- (Denmark) - 2 rounds, first 6 to Nordic final
- R1 (16 May, Uhre Speedway, Karup)
- R2 (17 May, Speedway Center, Holsted)
- Hans Nielsen seeded to Nordic Final

Pos.	Rider	Total
1	Gert Handberg	27
2	Brian Karger	23+3
3	John Jörgensen	23+2
4	Tommy Knudsen	21
5	Claus Jacobsen	19+3
6	Peter Ravn	19+2
7	Allan Johansen	18
8	Brian Andersen	18
9	Bo Eriksen	11
10	Jan Stæchmann	10
11	Jan Andersen	10
12	Tom P. Knudsen	9
13	Jan Pedersen	8
14	Lars-Henrik Jørgensen	7
15	Hans Clausen	7
16	René Madsen	4
17	Jacob Olsen (Res)	4
18	Jens-Peter Nielsen (Res)	2

=== Commonwealth Final ===
- First 11 to Overseas final

=== American Final ===
- First 5 to Overseas final plus 1 reserve

== Fifth round ==
=== Continental semi-finals ===
- 14 June
- (Hungary) Borsod Volán Stadion, Miskolc
- Top 7 to World semi-final

Pos.	Rider	Points
1	(Czechoslovakia) Zdeněk Tesař	11+3
2	(Poland) Slawomir Drabik	11+2
3	(Czechoslovakia) Roman Matoušek	11+1
4	(Czechoslovakia) Antonín Kasper Jr.	11+0
5	(Poland) Piotr Swist	10
6	(Poland) Piotr Paluch	10
7	(Czechoslovakia) Zdeněk Schneiderwind	10
8	(Russia) Mikhail Starostin	9
9	(Hungary) Zoltan Hajdu	8
10	(Czechoslovakia) Václav Milík Sr.	8
11	(Hungary) Zsolt Böszermenyi	7
12	(Hungary) Laszlo Bodi	3
13	(Poland) Andrzej Huszcza	3
14	(Czechoslovakia) Karel Průša	3
15	(Hungary) Zoltán Adorján	2
16	(Poland) Jacek Wozniak	1

- 14 June
- (Germany) Holsteinring Brokstedt, Brokstedt
- Top 7 to World semi-final

Pos.	Rider	Points
1	(Hungary) Antal Kocso	14
2	(Hungary) Róbert Nagy	12
3	(Czechoslovakia) Bohumil Brhel	9
4	(Germany) Gerd Riss	*+3
5	(Hungary) József Petrikovics	8+2
6	(Czechoslovakia) Petr Vandírek	8+1
7	(Poland) Mirosław Kowalik	8+0
8	(Poland) Robert Sawina	8+0
9	(Czechoslovakia) Vladimir Kalina	7
10	(Czechoslovakia) Borivoj Hadek	6
11	(Poland) Tomasz Gollob	6
12	(Italy) Armando Castagna	6
13	(Poland) Jacek Krzyzaniak	5
14	(Poland) Jaroslaw Olszewski	5
15	(Italy) Valentino Furlanetto	5
16	(Russia) Oleg Kurguskin	4

=== Nordic Final ===
- 14 June 1992
- (Norway) Elgane Speedway, Elgane
- First 9 to World Semi-final plus 1 reserve

Pos.	Rider	Total
1	(Sweden) Tony Rickardsson	12
2	(Sweden) Per Jonsson	10+3
3	(Denmark) Brian Karger	10+2
4	(Denmark) John Jörgensen	10+1
5	(Sweden) Jimmy Nilsen	10+0
6	(Denmark) Gert Handberg	9+
7	(Sweden) Henrik Gustafsson	9+
8	(Denmark) Tommy Knudsen	9+
9	(Norway) Einar Kyllingstad	9+
10	(Sweden) Peter Nahlin	9+
11	(Norway) Lars Gunnestad	8
12	(Denmark) Hans Nielsen	6
13	(Denmark) Claus Jacobsen	4
14	(Finland) Vesa Ylinen	3
15	(Sweden) Jörgen Johansson (Res)	1
16	(Denmark) Peter Ravn	0
17	(Finland) Juha Moksunen	0
18	(Norway) Arnt Førland (Res)	0

=== Overseas Final ===
- First 9 to World Semi-final plus 1 reserve

== Sixth round ==
=== World Semi-Finals ===
- 9 August 1992
- (England) Odsal Stadium, Bradford
- First 8 to World final plus 1 reserve

Pos.	Rider	Points
1	(Sweden) Per Jonsson	14+3
2	(England) Gary Havelock	14+2
3	(England) Kelvin Tatum	11
4	(Sweden) Jimmy Nilsen	9
5	(United States) Ronnie Correy	8+
6	(Czechoslovakia) Zdeněk Tesař	8+
7	(Denmark) John Jörgensen	8+
8	(Sweden) Henrik Gustafsson	8+
9	(Hungary) Antal Kocso	8+
10	(Czechoslovakia) Bohumil Brhel	8+
11	(England) Andy Smith	7
12	(Poland) Mirosław Kowalik	5
13	(Australia) Jason Lyons	5
14	(Czechoslovakia) Roman Matoušek	4
15	(Poland) Piotr Świst	2
16	(Poland) Piotr Paluch	1

- 15 August 1992
- (Austria) Stadion Wiener Neustadt, Wiener Neustadt
- First 7 to World final plus 1 reserve
- Sławomir Drabik seeded to World Final

Pos.	Rider	Points
1	(Denmark) Gert Handberg	15
2	(United States) Sam Ermolenko	14
3	(Denmark) Tommy Knudsen	11
4	(United States) Rick Miller	10
5	(Sweden) Tony Rickardsson	10
6	(Denmark) Brian Karger	9
7	(New Zealand) Mitch Shirra	9
8	(England) Martin Dugard	7+3
9	(Hungary) Róbert Nagy	7+2
10	(Germany) Gerd Riss	7+1
11	(Poland) Sławomir Drabik	7+0
12	(Czechoslovakia) Antonín Kasper Jr.	5
13	(Hungary) József Petrikovics	3
14	(Norway) Einar Kyllingstad	3
15	(Czechoslovakia) Petr Vandírek	2
16	(Czechoslovakia) Zdeněk Schneiderwind	1
17	(Sweden) Peter Nahlin (Res)	0

== World final ==
- 29 August 1992
- (Poland) Olympic Stadium, Wrocław

Placing	Rider	Total	1	2	3	4	5	6	7	8	9	10	11	12	13	14	15	16	17	18	19	20	Pts	Pos	21
1	(England) (8) Gary Havelock	14		3						2			3			3			3				14	1	
2	(Sweden) (6) Per Jonsson	11		0				3			2							3			3		11	2	
3	(Denmark) (13) Gert Handberg	10				3	2							3		2					0		10	3	
4	(Denmark) (3) Tommy Knudsen	9	3						3				0				1				2		9	4	
5	(Sweden) (5) Henrik Gustafsson	9		1			0					2					3					3	9	5	
6	(Denmark) (1) John Jørgensen	8	2				1				0				3				2				8	6	
7	(Sweden) (12) Jimmy Nilsen	7			3					X		3			0						1		7	7	
8	(United States) (9) Sam Ermolenko	7			1		3						1					X		2			7	8	
9	(Poland) (4) Sławomir Drabik	6	E							3				2				1				X	6	9	
10	(England) (11) Kelvin Tatum	6			0				0		3					1						2	6	10	
11	(United States) (14) Rick Miller	6				0		2					2		2							X	6	11	
12	(United States) (7) Ronnie Correy	6		2					2					0	1					1			6	12	
13	(New Zealand) (15) Mitch Shirra	6				2			1			1						2	0				6	13	
14	(Sweden) (10) Tony Rickardsson	5			2			1						1			0		1				5	14	
15	(Czechoslovakia) (16) Zdeněk Tesař	5				1				1	1						2			0			5	15	
16	(Denmark) (2) Brian Karger	4	1					0				0				0				3			4	16	
R1	(Hungary) (R1) Antal Kocso	0																					0	R1	
R2	(England) (R2) Martin Dugard	0																					0	R2	
Placing	Rider	Total	1	2	3	4	5	6	7	8	9	10	11	12	13	14	15	16	17	18	19	20	Pts	Pos	21

m - exclusion for exceeding two minute time allowance • t - exclusion for touching the tapes • x - other exclusion • e - retired or mechanical failure • f - fell • ns - non-starter • nc - non-classify

gate A - inside	gate B	gate C	gate D - outside
