= 1988 Individual Speedway World Championship =

Motorcycle speedway world championship season

Seasons
- ← 1987 1989 →

The 1988 Individual Speedway World Championship was the 43rd edition of the official World Championship to determine the world champion rider.

The final was held at the Vojens Speedway Center, owned by former World Champion Ole Olsen. Despite the country having won seven World Individual Championships between three riders since 1971 (Olsen, Erik Gundersen and Hans Nielsen), it was the first time Denmark hosted the World Final.

Gundersen renewed his fierce rivalry with Nielsen as both finished on 14 points to tie for the lead of the Championship. However it was Gundersen that won the toss to choose his starting gate for the run-off. He chose the outside and on a wet track he won his third title by defeating Nielsen in the run-off. Fellow Dane Jan O. Pedersen completed a clean sweep for Denmark by taking the bronze medal.

== First round ==
Qualification results.

=== British qualification ===
- Top 32 riders to British semi-finals

Date	Venue	Winner	2nd	3rd
8 April	Powderhall Stadium, Edinburgh	Mark Courtney	Rob Grant	Les Collins
10 April	Arlington Stadium, Eastbourne	Martin Dugard		
11 April	County Ground Stadium, Exeter	Andrew Silver	Steve Schofield	Andy Campbell
14 April	Cleveland Park Stadium, Middlesbrough	Darren Sumner	Steve Wilcock	Neville Tatum
16 April	Loomer Road Stadium, Chesterton	Graham Jones	Nigel Crabtree	Andy Galvin
Quarter-final
26 April	Wimborne Road, Poole	Les Collins	Neville Tatum	Steve Schofield

== Second round ==
=== West German Final ===
- 4 September '87
- (West Germany) Rottalstadion, Pocking
- Riders progress to Continental qualification

Pos.	Rider	Scores	Total
1	Tommy Dunker	3,3,3,3,3	15
2	Gerd Riss	3,3,3,2,3	14
3	Karl Maier	2,3,2,3,3	13
4	Carsten Pelzmann	3,2,1,3,1	10
5	Andreas Marynowski	2,2,1,3,2	10
6	Peter Schrock	2,1,3,2,2	10
7	Berndt Traunspurger	1,0,3,2,1	7
8	Tommy Broch	2,E,1,1,3	7
9	Klaus Freundorfer	1,2,2,F,2	7
10	Peter Hehlert	1,3,0,2,0	6
11	Alois Bachuber	0,1,2,1,1	5
12	Andre Pollehn	0,1,1,0,2	4
13	Hans Faltermeier	1,1,2,F,-	4
14	Heinz Huber	3,F,-,-,-	3
15	Hans Kressirer	0,2,0,1,E	3
16	Mario Trupkovic	0,0,0,0,1	1

=== Netherlands/Belgium Final ===
- Riders progress to Continental qualification
- (Netherlands) (Belgium)
- R1 (20 Apr '87, Stichting Baansport Blijham, Blijham)
- R2 (26 Apr '87, Olympic Stadium, Amsterdam)
- R3 (24 May '87, Veenoord Speedway, Veenoord)
- R4 (4 Jul '87, Stadionlaan, Heusden-Zolder)
- R5 (12 Jul '87, Veenoord Speedway, Veenoord)

Pos.	Rider	Scores	Total
1	Henk Steman	13+15+1+13,5+13	54,5
2	Rene Elzinga	3,5+8+15+15+15	53
3	Peter Seur	12+11,5+9+11,5+9,5	44,5
4	Geert Cools	ns+9+9+13,5+12	43,5
5	Wil Stoes	11+10+ns+7,5+14	42,5
6	Rob Steman	0,5+11,5+14+6+6,5	38,5
7	Robert Jam Munnecom	10+14+13+ns+ns	37
8	Rikus Gorter	8,5+3+11,5+9+5	34
9	Frans Cools	0,5+5,5+5,5+10+11	31
10	Ron Koppe	3,5+7+5,5+11,5+6,5	30,5
11	Frits Koppe	14+13+ns+ns+ns	27
12	Vital Cardeynaels	7+4+11,5+1+ns	23,5
13	Henny Kroeze	15+5,5+ns+ns+ns	20,5
14	Ron Van Dam	2+ns+7+7,5+3,5	20
15	Patrick Pino	5+ns+3,5+3,5+8	20
16	Aage Lucardie	ns+1+9+5+2	17
17	Fokke Van Der Walle	8,5+2+2+3,5+3,5	16,5
18	Hylke Dijkema	ns++ns+ns+ns+9,5	9,5
19	Willy Heremans	6+ns+3,5+ns+ns	9,5
20	Herman Heremans	ns+ns+ns+2+ns	2

=== Italian Final ===
- (Italy) Top 4 to Continental qualification
- Riders progress to Continental qualification
- R1 (29 Mar '87, Giavera del Montello, Treviso)
- R2 (5 Apr '87, Santa Marina Stadium, Lonigo)
- R3 (24 Apr '87, Pista Olimpia Terenzano, Terenzano)
- R4 (10 May '87, Stadio Ottorino Verzaro, Badia Polesine)
- R5 (4 Jul '87, Castiglione Olona, Varese)

Pos.	Rider	Scores	Total
1	Valentino Furlanetto	16+14+15+16	61
2	Armando Castagna	14+15+15+14	58
3	Paolo Salvatelli	12+11+13+9	45
4	Armando Dal Chiele	13+8+11+10	42
5	Ottaviano Righetto	11+12+10+9	42
6	Giuseppe Scalzolaro	9+10+9+5	33
7	Giorgio Zaramello	ns+10+8+12	30
8	Gianni Famari	ns+9+10+10	29
9	Giovanni Cragnolini	9+5+0+7	21
10	Fabrizio Vesperini	8+5+5+4	21
11	Gaetano Bressan	ns+7+8+5	20
12	Davide Guarise	4+6+ns+8	18
13	Amerigo Milanese	5+4+1+4	14
14	Mario Andriolo	6+3+3+0	12
15	Daniele Doro	6+0+4+1	11
16	Fabrizio Maggio	ns+2+5+3	10
17	Giuseppe Marzotto	ns+ns+4+ns	4
18	Domenico Solda	3+ns+ns+ns	3

=== Hungarian Final ===
- (Hungary) Riders progress to Continental qualification
- R1 (26 Apr '87, Christián László Municipal Sports Complex, Gyula)
- R2 (27 Jun '87, Borsod Volán Stadion, Miskolc)
- R3 (28 Jun '87, Hajdú Volán Stadion, Debrecen)

Pos.	Rider	Total
1	Zoltan Adorjan	30
2	József Petrikovics	28
3	Laszlo Bodi	24
4	Sandor Tihanyi	22
5	Antal Kocso	21
6	Zoltan Hajdu	21
7	Janoš Bologh	21
8	Janoš Sereš	19
9	Robert Nagy	16
10	Joszef Sziracky	14
11	Ferenc Juhaš	14
12	Ištvan Rušz	13
13	Andraš Kovacs	8
14	Robert Csilik	8
15	Sandor Ujhelyi	4
16	Janoš Oreško	3

=== Australian qualification ===
Date	Event	Venue	Winner	2nd	3rd
??	Northern Territory Championship	Arunga Park Speedway, Alice Springs	Glen Baxter	??	??
??	Victorian Championship	Olympic Park, Mildura	Phil Crump	Leigh Adams	??
??	New South Wales Championship	Newcastle Motordrome, Tomago	Stephen Davies	David Hamnett	Brian Dixon
??	South Australian Championship	Murray Bridge Speedway, Murray Bridge	Craig Hodgson	Mark Fiora	Darrell Branford
??	Queensland Championship	Rockhampton Showgrounds, Rockhampton	Steve Regeling	Troy Butler	??
??	Western Australian Championship	Claremont Speedway, Perth	Rob Woffinden*	Glenn Doyle	??

* Due to the rules, England's Rob Woffinden did not progress to the Australian Championship

=== New Zealand qualification ===
Date	Event	Venue	Winner	2nd	3rd
?	South Island Final	Nelson Speedway, Richmond	Larry Ross	Alan Mason	Mark Lyndon
??	North Island Final	Kihikihi Speedway, Kihikihi	Gary Allan	John Roberts	Chris Martin

=== British semi-finals ===
- 8 May
- (England) Oxford Stadium, Oxford
- Top 8 to British final

Pos.	Rider	Points
1	Simon Wigg	13
2	Jeremy Doncaster	12
3	John Davis	12
4	Andrew Silver	11
5	Marvyn Cox	11
6	Steve Schofield	9
7	Simon Cross	9
8	Andy Galvin	9
9	Alun Rossiter	8
10	Malcolm Holloway	7
11	Alan Grahame	
12	David Walsh	
13		
14		
15		
16		

- 8 May
- (England) Owlerton Stadium, Sheffield
- Top 8 to British final

Pos.	Rider	Points
1	Kelvin Tatum	14+3
2	Chris Morton	14+2
3	Neil Evitts	11
4	Neil Collins	10
5	Richard Knight	10
6	Sean Wilson	9
7	Gary Havelock	9
8	Andy Smith	9
9	Paul Thorp	8
10	Sean Willmott	8
11	Neville Tatum	4
12	Mark Loram	4
13	Les Collins	4
14	Michael Graves	3
15	Daz Sumner	3
16	Mark Courtney	0

=== Swedish qualification ===
- Top 8 in each heat to Swedish final

(7 May, Huddinge Motorstadion, Huddinge)
Pos	Rider	Points
1	Tony Olsson	15
2	Peter Karlsson	13
3	Conny Ivarsson	12+3
4	Mikael Ritterwall	12+2
5	Dennis Löfqvist	11
6	Christer Rohlén	10
7	Peter Nahlin	10
8	Tommy Nilsson	7
9	Erik Stenlund	6
10	Lars Andersson	6
11	Jörgen Johansson	5
12	Krister Gardell	5
13	Roger Söderberg	4
14	Sören Brolin	3
15	Kent Rickardsson	1
16	Mats Boström (res)	1
17	Tommy Lindgren	0
18	Teddie Jönsson	0

(7 May, Gislaved Motorbana, Gislaved)
Pos	Rider	Points
1	Claes Ivarsson	15
2	Jan Andersson	12
3	Bo Arrhén	11
4	Mikael Teurnberg	10
5	Niklas Karlsson	10
6	Kenneth Nyström	9+3
7	Roland Dannö	9+2
8	Patrik Karlsson	9+1
9	Mikael Blixt	9+0
10	Tony Gudbrand	6
11	Thomas Ek	6
12	Tony Zetterström	6
13	Patrik Palovaara	3
14	Christer Jonsson	3
15	Patrik Åhlund	2
16	Åke Fridell	0
17	Kristian Hultgren	0

== Third round ==
=== Continental preliminary round ===
Date	Venue	Winner	2nd	3rd
7 May	(Poland) Municipal Stadium, Ostrów	(Poland) Mirosław Korbel	(Poland) Ryszard Dołomisiewicz	(Soviet Union) Valery Gordeev
7 May	(Austria) Speedway Natschbach-Loipersbach	(Italy) Paolo Salvatelli	(Austria) Heinrich Sczatzer	(Hungary) Zoltan Hajdu
8 May	(Socialist Federal Republic of Yugoslavia) Ilirija Sports Park, Ljubljana	(Hungary) József Petrikovics	(Hungary) Janosh Bologh	(Bulgaria) Nikolai Manev
8 May	(Germany) Stadion Lindenau, Petershagen	(Soviet Union) Viktor Kuznetsov	(Netherlands) Henny Kroeze	(Czechoslovakia) Lubomir Jedek

=== British Final ===
- 22 May 1988
- (England) Brandon Stadium, Coventry
- First 9 to Commonwealth Final

Placing	Rider	Total	1	2	3	4	5	6	7	8	9	10	11	12	13	14	15	16	17	18	19	20	Pts	Pos	21	22
1	(England) (6) Simon Wigg	14		3				2			3							3			3		14	1		
2	(England) (14) Kelvin Tatum	13				3		3					2		2							3	13	2		
3	(England) (13) Chris Morton	11				2	2							3		3					1		11	3		3
4	(England) (3) Simon Cross	11	1						3				3				2				2		11	4		2
5	(England) (5) Neil Evitts	10		1			3					3					3					X	10	5		
6	(England) (12) Richard Knight	10			3					2		2			3						0		10	6		
7	(England) (16) John Davis	9				1				3	1						1			3			9	7		
8	(England) (2) Marvyn Cox	8	3					1				1				1				2			8	8		
9	(England) (1) Andy Smith	8	2				1				2				1				2				8	9		
10	(England) (8) Steve Schofield	6		0						E			1			2			3				6	10		
11	(England) (11) Andrew Silver	6			2				2		F					0						2	6	11		
12	(England) (7) Neil Collins	5		2					1					1	0					1			5	12		
13	(England) (4) Jeremy Doncaster	4	0							1				0				2				1	4	13		
14	(England) (10) Andy Galvin	3			1			F						2			0		0				3	14		
15	(England) (15) Sean Wilson	2				0			0			E						1	1				2	15		
16	(England) (9) Gary Havelock	0			F		-						-					-		-			0	16		
R1	(England) (R1) Andy Hackett	0					0											E					0	R1		
R2	(England) (R2) David Clarke	0											0							0			0	R2		
Placing	Rider	Total	1	2	3	4	5	6	7	8	9	10	11	12	13	14	15	16	17	18	19	20	Pts	Pos	21	22

m - exclusion for exceeding two minute time allowance • t - exclusion for touching the tapes • x - other exclusion • e - retired or mechanical failure • f - fell • ns - non-starter • nc - non-classify

gate A - inside	gate B	gate C	gate D - outside

=== Australian Final ===
- 23 January 1988
- (Australia) Murray Bridge Speedway, Murray Bridge
- Top 4 to Commonwealth Final

Pos.	Rider	Total
1	Phil Crump	15
2	Steve Regeling	11
3	Craig Hodgson	11
4	Mark Fiora	10
5	Troy Butler	10
6	David Jackson	9
7	Glen Baxter	8
8	Leigh Adams	8
9	Stephen Davies	7
10	Chris Watson	7
11	Steve Baker	6
12	Scott Fisher	6
13	Darrel Bradford	5
14	Glenn Doyle	4
15	Dave Hammett	1
16	Nigel Tramelling	1

=== New Zealand Final ===
- (New Zealand) Ruapuna Speedway, Christchurch
- Riders selected for Commonwealth Final

Pos.	Rider	Total
1	Larry Ross	15
2	David Bargh	14
3	Garry Allan	13
4	Mark Lyndon	11
5	Alan Mason	11
6	Mitch Shirra	9
7	Craig Wilkie	7
8	Nathan Murray	7
9	Justin Monk	7
10	John Roberts	7
11	Chris Martin	4
12	Mark Thorpe	4
13	Sam Morice	3
14	Mark Jamieyson	3
15	David Claydon	2
16	Spencer Timmo	2
17	Lens Chappell	0
18	Daren Hopewell	0

== Fourth round ==
=== Continental quarter-finals ===
- To 32 to Continental semi-finals

Date	Venue	Winner	2nd	3rd
22 May	(West Germany) Motodrom Halbemond, Norden	(Hungary) Antal Kocso	(Italy) Paolo Salvatelli	(West Germany) Gerd Riss
5 June	(Italy) Santa Marina Stadium, Lonigo	(Soviet Union) Viktor Kuznetsov	(Italy) Armando Dal Chiele	(Poland) Roman Jankowski
5 June	(Soviet Union) Rivne Speedway Stadium, Rivne	(Czechoslovakia) Antonín Kasper Jr.	(Hungary) Zoltán Adorján	(Czechoslovakia) Petr Vandirek
5 June	(Czechoslovakia) Speedway Žarnovica, Žarnovica	(Czechoslovakia) Roman Matoušek	(West Germany) Klaus Freundorfer	(Poland) Miroslaw Korbel

=== Danish Final ===
- 8 May
- (Denmark) Outrup Speedway Center, Outrup,
- First 7 to Nordic final plus 1 reserve

Pos.	Rider	Total
1	Hans Nielsen	15
2	Jan O. Pedersen	14
3	Erik Gundersen	13
4	Peter Ravn	10
5	Peter Glanz	9
6	Per Sorensen	9
7	John Jørgensen	8+3
8	Tommy Knudsen	8+2
9	Jan Stæchmann	7
10	Frank Andersen	6
11	John Eskildsen	6
12	Flemming Pedersen	6
13	Sam Nikolajsen	5
14	Aksel Jepsen	4
15	Jan Pedersen	0
16	Finn Rune Jensen	0

=== Norway Final ===
- (Norway) Elgane Speedway, Varhaug
- 30 August 1987, top 1 (+1 seeded) to Nordic final 1988

Pos.	Rider	Points
1	Tor Einar Hielm	14
2	Arnt Førland	12+3
3	Jan Arid Slatta	12+2
4	Robert Lengland	11
5	Ingvar Skogland	10

=== Finland Final ===
- (Finland) Pippo Speedway, Lahti
- 26 August 1987, top 1 (+1 seeded) riders to Nordic Final 1988

Pos.	Rider	Total
1	Ari Koponen	15
2	Vesa Ylinen	14
3	Roy Malminheimo	13
4	Aki Ala Riihimaki	11
5	Olli Turkia	11
6	Aarre Soivuori	7
7	Juha Moksunen	6
8	Jorma Frantila	6
9	Janne Moksunen	5
10	Markku Haapala	5
11	Mikael Back	5
12	Esa Einola	5
13	Marko Hyyrylainen (res)	5
14	Petri Kokko	3
15	Jari Kortelainen	3
16	Jari Moisio	3
17	Tapio Suutari (res)	1
18	Janne Koivula	0
19	Reijo Mattila (res)	0

=== Swedish Final ===
- (Sweden) First 3 to Nordic Final plus 1 reserve
- Per Jonsson and Jimmy Nilsen seeded to Nordic Final
- R1 (17 May, Malmö Motorstadion, Malmö)
- R2 (18 May, Norrköping Motorstadion, Norrköping)
- R3 (19 May, Orionparken, Hallstavik)

Pos.	Rider	R1	R2	R3	Total
1	Conny Ivarsson	12	13	14	39
2	Peter Nahlin	11	14	13	38
3	Mikael Blixt	12	13	13	38
4	Christer Rohlén	14	10	9	33
5	Tony Olsson	9	12	10	31
6	Mikael Ritterwall	8	3	12	23
7	Peter Karlsson	8	8	7	23
8	Kenneth Nyström	10	9	4	23
9	Mikael Teurnberg	4	8	8	20
10	Dennis Löfqvist	7	8	4	19
11	Claes Ivarsson	6	8	4	18
12	Bo Arréhn	4	6	7	17
13	Tommy Nilsson	3	5	2	10
14	Tony Gudbrand	-	-	8	8
15	Roland Dannö	4	2	-	6
16	Tony Zetterström (res)	3	-	3	6
17	Patrik Karlsson	5	0	-	5
18	Krister Gardell (res)	-	0	1	1

=== American Final ===
- 11 June
- (United States) Veterans Memorial Stadium, Long Beach
- First 5 to Overseas final plus 1 reserve

Pos.	Rider	Heat Scores	Total
1	Sam Ermolenko	4,4,4,4,4	20
2	Robert Pfetzing	4,2,4,3,4	17+3
3	Rick Miller	4,4,3,4,2	17+2
4	Mike Faria	3,3,2,3,4	15
5	Bobby Schwartz	1,4,4,2,3	14
6	Shawn Moran	3,4,3,F,3	13
7	Ronnie Correy	3,3,3,3,0	12
8	Kelly Moran	2,3,4,0,2	11
9	Randy Green	0,3,2,2,4	11
10	Steve Lucero	2,2,3,2,1	10
11	Ed Castro	2,2,2,1,3	10
12	Lance King	4,2,E,0,3	9
13	Brad Oxley	1,1,1,4,2	9
14	Shawn Venables	1,0,2,4,1	8
15	Dub Ferrell	3,0,E,2,2	7
16	Bart Bast	1,1,1,3,0	6
17	Billy Hamill	0,1,0,1,1	3
18	Gary Hicks	2,0,0,-,-	2
19	Scotty Brown (res)	0,1,-,-,-	1
20	Alan Christian	0,0,0,1,0	1
21	Len Dillon	1	

=== Commonwealth Final ===
- 12 June 12
- Norfolk Arena, King's Lynn
- First 11 to Overseas Final plus 1 reserve

Pos.	Rider	Heat Scores	Total
1	(England) Kelvin Tatum	3,2,3,3,3	14
2	(New Zealand) Mitch Shirra	2,3,3,2,3	13
3	(England) Simon Wigg	3,3,3,3,0	12
4	(England) John Davis	3,1,2,2,3	11
5	(England) Simon Cross	3,0,3,X,3	9
6	(England) Chris Morton	1,3,2,2,1	9
7	(England) Neil Evitts	2,1,0,3,2	8
8	(England) Andy Smith	1,3,1,1,2	8
9	(England) Richard Knight	F,X,2,3,2	7
10	(Australia) Craig Hodgson	2,2,1,1,1	7
11	(England) Marvyn Cox	2,1,1,1,2	7
12	(Australia) Mark Fiora	0,2,0,2,1	5
13	(New Zealand) David Bargh	0,2,1,0,0	3
14	(Australia) Steve Baker	0,0,2,1,0	3
15	(Australia) Steve Regeling	1,1,0,0,1	3
16	(New Zealand) Mark Lyndon	1,0,0,E,0	1

== Fifth round ==
=== Continental semi-finals ===
- 18 June
- (Poland) Stal Rzeszów Municipal Stadium, Rzeszów
- Top 8 to Continental final

Pos.	Rider	Points
1	(Czechoslovakia) Roman Matoušek	14+3
2	(Poland) Zenon Kasprzak	14+2
3	(Poland) Roman Jankowski	10
4	(Czechoslovakia) Lubomír Jedek	9
5	(Poland) Andrzej Huszcza	8
6	(Poland) Miroslaw Korbel	8
7	(Poland) Ryszard Franczyszyn	8
8	(Poland) Dariusz Stenka	8
9	(Italy) Armando Castagna	8
10	(Italy) Armando Dal Chiele	8
11	(Poland) Slawomir Drabik	7
12	(Soviet Union) Viktor Kuznetsov	6
13	(Italy) Valentino Furlanett	4
14	(Poland) Janusz Stachyra	3
15	(Czechoslovakia) Gaspar Forgac	2
16	(West Germany) Klaus Freundorfer	2

- 18 June
- (Hungary) Borsod Volán Stadion, Miskolc
- Top 8 to Continental final

Pos.	Rider	Points
1	(West Germany) Gerd Riss	15
2	(Hungary) Sandor Tihanyi	12
3	(Hungary) Antal Kocso	12
4	(Czechoslovakia) Antonín Kasper Jr.	10
5	(Italy) Paolo Salvatelli	10
6	(Hungary) Janos Balogh	10
7	(Czechoslovakia) Zdeněk Schneiderwind	9
8	(Hungary) Zoltán Adorján	9
9	(Hungary) Zoltan Hajdu	8
10	(Austria) Heinrich Schatzer	8
11	(Hungary) Sandor Ujhelyi	5
12	(Soviet Union) Fedor Sacharov	5
13	(Soviet Union) Igor Marko	5
14	(Czechoslovakia) Petr Vandírek	2
15	(West Germany) Hans Faltermeier	1
16	(Bulgaria) Nikolaj Manev	1
17	(West Germany) Mario Trupkovic (res)	0

=== Nordic Final ===
- 25 July
- (Norway) Sandnes Stadion, Sandnes
- First 7 to Intercontinental final plus 1 reserve

Placing	Rider	Total	1	2	3	4	5	6	7	8	9	10	11	12	13	14	15	16	17	18	19	20	Pts	Pos	21
1	(Denmark) (7) Hans Nielsen	15		3					3					3	3					3			15	1	
2	(Denmark) (13) Erik Gundersen	13				3	3							2		2					3		13	2	
3	(Denmark) (12) Jan O. Pedersen	12			3					3		3			1						2		12	3	
4	(Sweden) (1) Per Jonsson	11	3				E				3				2				3				11	4	
5	(Denmark) (5) Peter Ravn	11		2			2					2					2					3	11	5	
6	(Denmark) (10) John Jørgensen	10			2			2						1			3		2				10	6	
7	(Sweden) (2) Conny Ivarsson	8	2					3				0				1				2			8	7	3
8	(Norway) (8) Ingvar Skogland	8		1						2			1			3			1				8	8	2
9	(Sweden) (9) Jimmy Nilsen	7			1		1						3					2		E			7	9	
10	(Sweden) (11) Peter Nahlin	6			0				2		2					0						2	6	10	
11	(Denmark) (3) Peter Glanz	5	1						0				2				1				1		5	11	
12	(Finland) (4) Kai Niemi	4	0							1				0				3				E	4	12	
13	(Norway) (16) Tor Einar Hielm	3				1				0	1						0			1			3	13	
14	(Denmark) (15) Per Sorensen	3				0			1			1						1	0				3	14	
15	(Sweden) (14) Mikael Blixt	2				2		E					E		0							E	2	15	
16	(Finland) (6) Ari Koponen	1		0				1			0							-			-		1	16	
R1	(Sweden) (R1) Christer Rohlen	0																0					0	R1	
R2	(Norway) (R2) Arnt Forland	0																			0		0	R2	
Placing	Rider	Total	1	2	3	4	5	6	7	8	9	10	11	12	13	14	15	16	17	18	19	20	Pts	Pos	21

m - exclusion for exceeding two minute time allowance • t - exclusion for touching the tapes • x - other exclusion • e - retired or mechanical failure • f - fell • ns - non-starter • nc - non-classify

gate A - inside	gate B	gate C	gate D - outside

=== Overseas Final ===
- 12 July
- (England) Brandon Stadium, Coventry
- First 9 to Intercontinental Final plus 1 reserve

Placing	Rider	Total	1	2	3	4	5	6	7	8	9	10	11	12	13	14	15	16	17	18	19	20	Pts	Pos	21
1	(England) (6) Simon Cross	13		2				3			3							3			2		13	1	3
2	(England) (10) Kelvin Tatum	13			3			1						3			3		3				13	2	2
3	(England) (8) Simon Wigg	13		3						2			3			3			2				13	3	1
4	(England) (2) Chris Morton	12	2					2				3				2				3			12	4	
5	(England) (14) Marvyn Cox	10				3		0					1		3							3	10	5	
6	(New Zealand) (3) Mitch Shirra	10	3						1				2				1				3		10	6	
7	(England) (4) Richard Knight	8	0							3				2				2				1	8	7	
8	(United States) (5) Sam Ermolenko	7		0			3					2					2					F	7	8	
9	(England) (13) John Davis	7				2	2							1		1					1		7	9	
10	(England) (15) Andy Smith	6				1			3			1						0	1				6	10	3
11	(United States) (11) Mike Faria	6			1				2		1					0						2	6	11	2
12	(United States) (7) Robert Pfetzing	5		1					0					F	2					2			5	12	
13	(United States) (16) Rick Miller	4				0				1	2						0			1			4	13	
14	(United States) (9) Bobby Schwartz	3			2		0						0					1		0			3	14	
15	(England) (1) Neil Evitts	3	1				1				F				1				0				3	15	
16	(Australia) (12) Craig Hodgson	0			0					0		0			0						0		0	16	
Placing	Rider	Total	1	2	3	4	5	6	7	8	9	10	11	12	13	14	15	16	17	18	19	20	Pts	Pos	21

m - exclusion for exceeding two minute time allowance • t - exclusion for touching the tapes • x - other exclusion • e - retired or mechanical failure • f - fell • ns - non-starter • nc - non-classify

gate A - inside	gate B	gate C	gate D - outside

== Sixth round ==
=== Continental Final ===
- 16 August 1988
- (Poland) Alfred Smoczyk Stadium, Leszno
- First 5 to World Final plus 1 reserve

Placing	Rider	Total	1	2	3	4	5	6	7	8	9	10	11	12	13	14	15	16	17	18	19	20	Pts	Pos	21	22
1	(Poland) (15) Zenon Kasprzak	14				3			3			3						2	3				14	1		
2	(Hungary) (10) Antal Kocso	13			3			3						2			3		2				13	2		
3	(Poland) (3) Roman Jankowski	12	3						2				3				2				2		12	3		3
4	(Czechoslovakia) (2) Roman Matoušek	12	2					2				2				3				3			12	4		2
5	(Hungary) (9) Sándor Tihanyi	11			2		2						2					3		2			11	5	3	
6	(Poland) (13) Andrzej Huszcza	11				2	3							3		2					1		11	6	2	
7	(West Germany) (6) Gerd Riss	9		3				0			2							1			3		9	7		
8	(Czechoslovakia) (4) Antonín Kasper Jr.	8	1							3				1				0				3	8	8		
9	(Italy) (5) Paolo Salvatelli	6		2			F					1					1					2	6	9		
10	(Poland) (8) Dariusz Stenka	5		1						2			0			1			1				5	10		
11	(Czechoslovakia) (7) Lubomir Jedek	4		0					1					0	3					0			4	11		
12	(Hungary) (11) Zoltán Adorján	3			X				0		3					X						0	3	12		
13	(Poland) (14) Ryszard Franczyszyn	3				1		1					1		F							-	3	13		
14	(Hungary) (1) Janosh Bologh	3	0				1				1				1				0				3	14		
15	(Czechoslovakia) (12) Zdenek Schneiderwind	2			X					0		0			2						0		2	15		
16	(Poland) (16) Mirosław Korbel	2				0				1	F						0			1			2	16		
R1	(Italy) (R1) Armando Castagna	1																				1	1	R1		
Placing	Rider	Total	1	2	3	4	5	6	7	8	9	10	11	12	13	14	15	16	17	18	19	20	Pts	Pos	21	22

m - exclusion for exceeding two minute time allowance • t - exclusion for touching the tapes • x - other exclusion • e - retired or mechanical failure • f - fell • ns - non-starter • nc - non-classify

gate A - inside	gate B	gate C	gate D - outside

=== Intercontinental Final ===
- 6 August
- (Sweden) Vetlanda Motorstadion, Vetlanda
- First 11 to the World Final plus 1 reserve

Placing	Rider	Total	1	2	3	4	5	6	7	8	9	10	11	12	13	14	15	16	17	18	19	20	Pts	Pos	21
1	(Denmark) (6) Jan O. Pedersen	14		3				3			3							3			2		14	1	
2	(Denmark) (1) Hans Nielsen	12	3				3				2				1				3				12	2	3
3	(Denmark) (15) Erik Gundersen	12				3			3			3						2	1				12	3	2
4	(Sweden) (5) Per Jonsson	11		2			2					3					1					3	11	4	1
5	(England) (7) Kelvin Tatum	11		2					2					3	3					1			11	5	
6	(Sweden) (10) Conny Ivarsson	9			1			2						2			2		2				9	6	
7	(England) (3) Chris Morton	8	1						1				0				3				3		8	7	
8	(England) (8) John Davis	8		1						3			2			2			0				8	8	
9	(Denmark) (2) John Jørgensen	7	2					0				0				3				2			7	9	
10	(England) (11) Simon Wigg	7			2				0		1					1						3	7	10	
11	(United States) (12) Sam Ermolenko	7			0					2		2			2						1		7	11	
12	(England) (14) Simon Cross	5				2		1					1		0							1	5	12	
13	(Denmark) (9) Peter Ravn	3			0		0						1					E		2			3	13	
14	(New Zealand) (4) Mitch Shirra	2	0							1				1				0				0	2	14	
15	(England) (13) Marvyn Cox	2				1	1							0		0					0		2	15	
16	(England) (16) Richard Knight	1				E				0	0						1			0			1	16	
Placing	Rider	Total	1	2	3	4	5	6	7	8	9	10	11	12	13	14	15	16	17	18	19	20	Pts	Pos	21

m - exclusion for exceeding two minute time allowance • t - exclusion for touching the tapes • x - other exclusion • e - retired or mechanical failure • f - fell • ns - non-starter • nc - non-classify

gate A - inside	gate B	gate C	gate D - outside

== World Final ==
- 3 September 1988
- (Denmark) Speedway Center, Vojens

Placing	Rider	Total	1	2	3	4	5	6	7	8	9	10	11	12	13	14	15	16	17	18	19	20	Pts	Pos	21
1	(Denmark) (1) Erik Gundersen	14	3				3				3				3				2				14	1	3
2	(Denmark) (9) Hans Nielsen	14			3		2						3					3		3			14	2	2
3	(Denmark) (10) Jan O. Pedersen	13			2			2						3			3		3				13	3	
4	(United States) (14) Sam Ermolenko	12				3		3					2		1							3	12	4	
5	(Sweden) (12) Per Jonsson	9			X					3		1			2						3		9	5	
6	(England) (2) Simon Wigg	9	2					0				3				2				2			9	6	
7	(Czechoslovakia) (13) Roman Matoušek	8				1	1							2		3					1		8	7	
8	(England) (16) Kelvin Tatum	8				2				2	1						2			1			8	8	
9	(Sweden) (3) Conny Ivarsson	7	1						3				1				0				2		7	9	
10	(England) (5) Chris Morton	6		3			0					0					1					2	6	10	
11	(Hungary) (11) Antal Kocso	6			1				2		2					0						1	6	11	
12	(England) (7) John Davis	3		2					1					F	E					0			3	12	
13	(Denmark) (6) John Jørgensen	3		0				1			E							2			E		3	13	
14	(Poland) (15) Zenon Kasprzak	3				0			0			2						1	0				3	14	
15	(Hungary) (8) Sándor Tihanyi	3		1						0			0			1			1				3	15	
16	(Poland) (4) Roman Jankowski	2	0							1				1				0				E	2	16	
R1	(England) (R1) Simon Cross	0																					0	R1	
R2	(Poland) (R2) Andrzej Huszcza	0																					0	R2	
Placing	Rider	Total	1	2	3	4	5	6	7	8	9	10	11	12	13	14	15	16	17	18	19	20	Pts	Pos	21

m - exclusion for exceeding two minute time allowance • t - exclusion for touching the tapes • x - other exclusion • e - retired or mechanical failure • f - fell • ns - non-starter • nc - non-classify

gate A - inside	gate B	gate C	gate D - outside
