= 1988 Speedway World Pairs Championship =

19th edition of the World motorcycle speedway Pairs Championship

1988 World Pairs Championship

Seasons
- ← 1987 1989 →

The 1988 Speedway World Pairs Championship was the nineteenth FIM Speedway World Pairs Championship. The final took place in Bradford, England. The championship was won by Denmark (45 points) who beat host team England (41 points) and United States (39 points).

== Semi final 1 ==
- (West Germany) Altes Stadion, Abensberg
- 23 May

Pos.	Team	Rider	Points
1	Denmark (45 pts)	Hans Nielsen	23
1	Denmark (45 pts)	Erik Gundersen	22
2	New Zealand (41 pts)	Mitch Shirra	24
2	New Zealand (41 pts)	David Bargh	17
3	West Germany (40 pts)	Gerd Riss	25
3	West Germany (40 pts)	Karl Maier	15
4	Poland (34 pts)	Piotr Swist	19
4	Poland (34 pts)	Roman Jankowski	15
5	Czechoslovakia (31 pts)	Roman Matoušek	17
5	Czechoslovakia (31 pts)	Antonín Kasper Jr.	13
6	Finland (31 pts)	Kai Niemi	21
6	Finland (31 pts)	Olli Tyrväinen	10
7	Bulgaria (18 pts)	Nikolaj Manev	9
7	Bulgaria (18 pts)	Angel Eftimov	9
8	Norway (16 pts)	Ingvar Skogland	10
8	Norway (16 pts)	Tor Einar Hielm	6
9	Netherlands (15 pts)	Robert Jan Munnecom	8
9	Netherlands (15 pts)	Rene Elzinga	7

== Semi final 2 ==
- (Austria) Stadion Wiener Neustadt, Wiener Neustadt
- 30 May

Pos.	Team	Rider	Points
1	United States (50 pts)	Sam Ermolenko	25
1	United States (50 pts)	Shawn Moran	25
2	Sweden (43 pts)	Per Jonsson	25
2	Sweden (43 pts)	Jimmy Nilsen	18
3	Hungary (40 pts)	Zoltán Adorján	23
3	Hungary (40 pts)	Antal KocsoK	17
4	Italy (37 pts)	Paolo Salvatelli	22
4	Italy (37 pts)	Valentino Furlanetto	15
5	Austria (32 pts)	Heinrich Schatzer	20
5	Austria (32 pts)	Toni Pilotto	12
6	Australia (22 pts)	Steve Regeling	12
6	Australia (22 pts)	Steve Baker	10
7	France (14 pts)	Patrice Blondy	11
7	France (14 pts)	Alain Blondy	3
8	Belgium (10 pts)	Geert Cools	8
8	Belgium (10 pts)	Frans Cools	2
9	Yugoslavia (4 pts)	Lazar Csaba	3
9	Yugoslavia (4 pts)	Artur Horvat	1

== World final ==
- (England) Odsal Stadium, Bradford
- 31 July

Pos.	Team	Rider	Points
1st	Denmark (45 pts)	Hans Nielsen	27
1st	Denmark (45 pts)	Erik Gundersen	18
2nd	England (41 pts)	Kelvin Tatum	21
2nd	England (41 pts)	Simon Cross	20
3rd	United States (39 pts)	Shawn Moran	23
3rd	United States (39 pts)	Sam Ermolenko	16
4	New Zealand (32 pts)	Mitch Shirra	24
4	New Zealand (32 pts)	Alan Rivett*	8
5	Sweden (29 pts)	Jimmy Nilsen	17
5	Sweden (29 pts)	Per Jonsson	12
6	Hungary (25 pts)	Antal Kocso	15
6	Hungary (25 pts)	Zoltán Adorján	10
7	Italy (21 pts)	Armando Castagna	17
7	Italy (21 pts)	Valentino Furlanetto	4
8	West Germany (21 pts)	Gerd Riss	17
8	West Germany (21 pts)	Tommy Dunker	4
9	Poland (17 pts)	Piotr Świst	9
9	Poland (17 pts)	Roman Jankowski	8

* New Zealand born, Australian rider Alan Rivett replaced injured New Zealand rider David Bargh

== See also ==
- 1988 Individual Speedway World Championship
- 1988 Speedway World Team Cup
- motorcycle speedway
- 1988 in sports
