= Simon Cross =

British motorcycle speedway rider

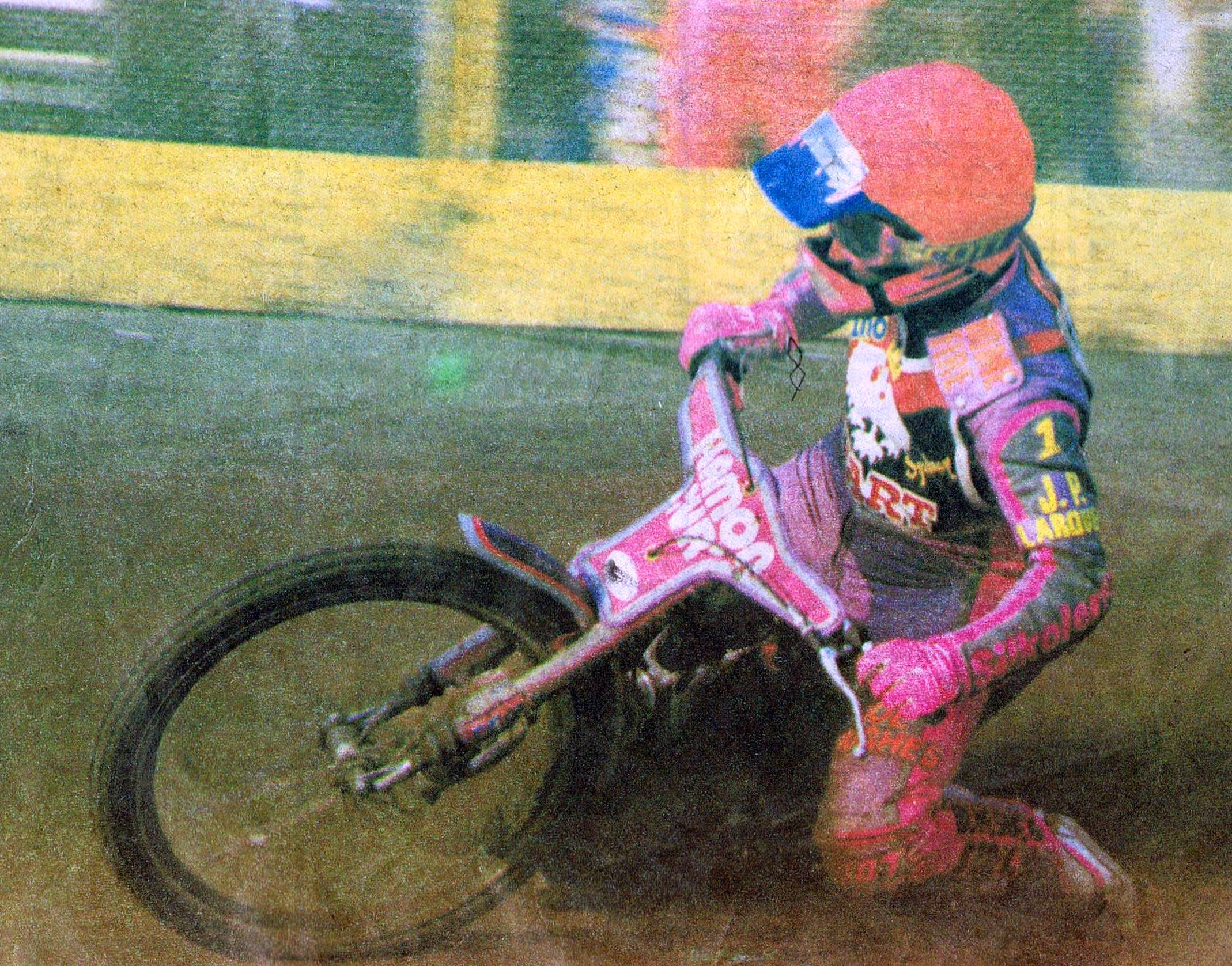
- Born: 31 May 1965 (age 61); Hereford, England
- Nationality: British (English)

Career history

Great Britain
- 1982: Oxford Cheetahs
- 1983: Weymouth Wildcats
- 1982-1995: Cradley Heathens
- 1991: Middlesbrough Bears
- 1996: Coventry Bees

Sweden
- 1995-1996: Smederna

Individual honours
- 1988: Overseas Champion
- 1986 1994: British Masters grasstrack Champion
- 1987: British 350 grasstrack Champion
- 1986: European Grasstrack Champion
- 1987: WA State Champion

Team honours
- 1989: World Team Cup
- 1983: British League Champion
- 1983, 1986 (shared), 1987, 1988, 1989: British League KO Cup winner
- 1983: National League Pairs Champion
- 1995: Premier League Four-Team Championship
- 1984, 1986 (shared): British League Cup
- 1983, 1984, 1987: Midland Cup champion

Simon James Cross (born 31 May 1965 in Hereford, England) is a former motorcycle speedway rider who spent most of his career with the Cradley Heathens.

== Career ==
Cross began his British leagues speedway career riding for the Oxford Cheetahs during the 1982 National League season. The following season, as a Weymouth Wildcats rider, he won the National League Pairs Championship with Martin Yeates.

In early 1987, Cross was part of a touring troupe to Australia, which included (among others) World Champion Hans Nielsen, Tommy Knudsen, Shawn Moran and Rick Miller. While in Australia, he won the 1986/87 Western Australian State Championship at the Claremont Speedway in Perth. Also in 1987, Cross qualified for his first and only World Final in the 1987 Individual Speedway World Championship, run over two days at the Olympic Stadium in Amsterdam. He finished in tenth place with ten points scored (seven on day one, three on day two).

In 1988, Cross continued to ride for the Cradley Heathens and later in the season, Cross and Kelvin Tatum finished runner-up in Speedway World Pairs Championship.

The following year, Cross represented England, when they won the 1989 Speedway World Team Cup final at the Odsal Stadium in Bradford. Cross was involved in the infamous terrible crash on turn 1 of the first heat of the meeting which not only took all four riders out of the meeting, but ended the career of his Cradley teammate and three time World Champion Erik Gundersen. The Dane led out of the gate, but as Gundersen broadsided into the first turn Jimmy Nilsen and Lance King were battling one another for position and Gundersen was clipped from behind by them causing him to highside and all four riders (Gundersen, Cross, Nilsen and King to crash). Nilsen and King were thrown towards the outside of the track and Cross, in attempting to negotiate through the melee hit Gundersen and was himself struck in the face by a wayward bike. Gundersen suffered head and spinal injuries. None of the riders took any further part in the meeting with King having a neck injury, Nilsen hip and thigh injuries and Cross a badly cut face. All four were taken to Hospital. Great Britain took the gold medal that day and were World Champions but the meeting had been overshadowed.

In 1990, Cross finished runner-up in the British Speedway Championship.

In 1995, Cross was part of the Cradley Heathens four that won the Premier League Four-Team Championship, which was held on 6 August 1995, at the East of England Arena.

At retirement, Cross had earned 33 international caps for the England national team.

== World Final Appearances ==
=== Individual World Championship ===
- 1987 - (Netherlands) Amsterdam, Olympic Stadium - 11th - 10pts
- 1988 - (Denmark) Vojens, Speedway Center - Reserve - Did Not Ride

=== World Pairs Championship ===
- 1988 - (England) Bradford, Odsal Stadium (with Kelvin Tatum) - 2nd - 41pts (20)
- 1990 - (West Germany) Landshut, Ellermühle Stadium (with Kelvin Tatum) - 8th - 20pts (0)

=== World Team Cup ===
- 1987 - (Denmark) Fredericia, Fredericia Speedway, (England) Coventry, Brandon Stadium and (Czechoslovakia) Prague, Marketa Stadium (with Kelvin Tatum / Simon Wigg / Jeremy Doncaster / Marvyn Cox) - 2nd - 101pts (21)
- 1988 - (United States) Long Beach, Veterans Memorial Stadium (with Simon Wigg / Kelvin Tatum / Chris Morton / Gary Havelock) - 4th - 22pts (3)
- 1989 - (England) Bradford, Odsal Stadium (with Jeremy Doncaster / Kelvin Tatum / Paul Thorp / Simon Wigg) - Winner - 48pts (0)

== World Longtrack Championship ==
Finalist

- 1987 (Germany) Mühldorf 2pts (19th as Reserve)
- 1988 (Germany) Scheeßel 3pts (16th)
- 1995 (Germany) Scheeßel 11pts (9th)

Grand-Prix Overall

- 1998 8th (45pts)

== European Grasstrack Championship ==
Finalist

- 1985 (France) La Reole 5pts (14th)
- 1986 (Netherlands) Eenrum 24pts (CHAMPION)
