= Per Jonsson =

Swedish speedway rider

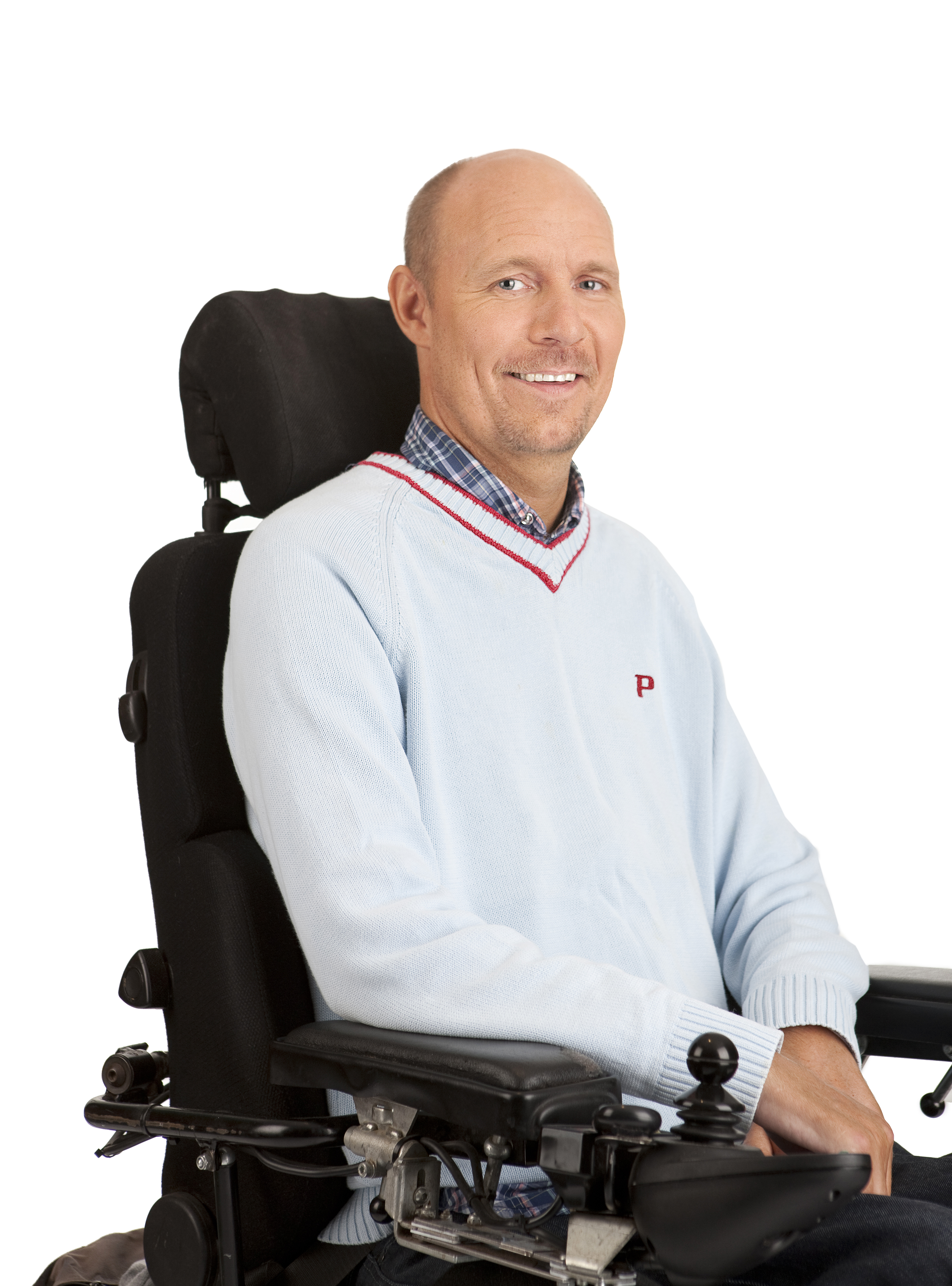
- Per Jonsson in February 2013
- Born: 21 March 1966 (age 60); Stockholm, Sweden
- Nationality: Swedish

Career history

Sweden
- 1982–1987, 1989–1993: Getingarna/Stockholm United
- 1988: Bysarna
- 1994: Rospiggarna

Great Britain
- 1984–1988, 1990, 1992–1994: Reading Racers

Poland
- 1991–1994: Toruń

Individual honours
- 1990: World Champion
- 1985: European Under 21 Champion
- 1986, 1987, 1988, 1993: Swedish Champion
- 1988: Golden Helmet of Pardubice
- 1993: British League Riders Champion
- 1988: Golden Gala (Italy)
- 1988: Golden Bar (Denmark)

Team honours
- 1993: World Pairs Champion
- 1982, 1983, 1985, 1986, 1988, 1989: Swedish League Champion
- 1990, 1992: British League Champion
- 1990: British League KO Cup Winner
- 1991, 1993: Premiership Winner
- 1992: BSPA Cup Winner
- 1993: British League Fours Champion
- 1994: Allsvenskan Winner

Per Christer Jonsson (born 21 March 1966 in Stockholm, Sweden) is a former speedway rider who won the Speedway World Championship in 1990, and finished runner-up in 1992. He earned 65 international caps for the Sweden national speedway team and also represented Sweden in the World Team Cup on seven occasions between 1985 and 1993.

== Career ==
Jonsson came to prominence after helping his first club Getingarna win the Swedish Speedway Team Championship in 1982. He signed for his first British club the Reading Racers in 1984 and began racing for them during the 1984 British League season.

Jonsson's career took off after he won the 1985 Individual Speedway Junior European Championship at Abensberg, West Germany. He would also represent Sweden in the Speedway World Pairs Championship and the Speedway World Team Cup for the first time, in addition to winning a second league title with Getingarna.

Jonsson became the Swedish Champion for the first time in 1986 and the following season won it again before making his first appearance in a World Final, in the 1987 Individual Speedway World Championship, held at Amsterdam's Olympic Stadium. The final was held over two days and the 22-year-old finished fifth on both days and was classed as 5th overall. He was now considered one of the leading riders in the world.

In 1988, Jonsson had a remarkable season, moving to Bysarna from Getingarna during the 1988 Swedish speedway season, where he won a third consecutive individual Swedish title and won the league with the club. Additionally, in Europe he won the Golden Helmet of Pardubice, the Golden Bar and Golden Gala events. He qualified for the 1988 World Final at Vojens, Denmark and equalled his 1987 result by finishing in fifth place and won a bronze medal at the 1988 Speedway World Team Cup.

Following the end of the 1988 season, Jonsson returned to Getingarna, now known as Stockholm United and won a fifth Swedish league championship. He missed the 1989 British League season, preferring instead to enjoy the joys of fatherhood. On the international front, he finished second with Jimmy Nilsen in 1989 Speedway World Pairs Championship in Leszno, Poland and won a second consecutive bronze medal at the 1989 Speedway World Team Cup.

Jonsson achieved the ultimate aim of all riders by winning the 1990 World Championship at the Odsal Stadium in Bradford, England, becoming Sweden's first Speedway World Champion since Anders Michanek. He made his third World Final by qualifying finishing second in both the Scandinavian and Intercontinental Finals. He also returned to Reading Racers, winning both the 1990 British League Championship and the British League Knockout Cup. Following this, Jonsson captained the Swedish team on a short tour of Australia in January 1991, the first time since 1971/72 that a Swedish speedway team had toured down under. Sweden, whose lineup was Jonsson, Henrik Gustafsson, Jimmy Nilsen, Tony Rickardsson, Conny Ivarsson, Erik Stenlund and Peter Nahlin defeated the Phil Crump captained Australia (who fielded 14 riders over the series) 3–2 in the five match series with Jonsson topping the averages for both teams with 16.4 per test. The Swede's proved a popular draw card in Australia.

In 1991, Jonsson was second again, with Nilsen and Henrik Gustafsson in the 1991 Speedway World Pairs Championship in Poznań, Poland and won the silver medal at the 1991 Speedway World Team Cup. Jonsson failed to place in the 1991 World Final at the Ullevi Stadium in Göteborg, finishing in 9th place.

The elusive World Cup victory continued in 1992, when Jonsson won silver again at the 1992 Speedway World Team Cup. His 1992 Individual Speedway World Championship got off to a bad start in Wrocław, Poland, when he failed to score in his first ride. He then came back to win three of his last four rides to finish in a clear 2nd place behind England's Gary Havelock. In the world pairs, he finished third with Gustafsson and Rickardsson in Lonigo, Italy.

Jonsson finally won the World Pairs Championship (which was the last to be run) with Rickardsson and Gustafsson in 1993 in Vojens and won another bronze medal at the 1993 Speedway World Team Cup. In Britain, he won the British League Riders' Championship.

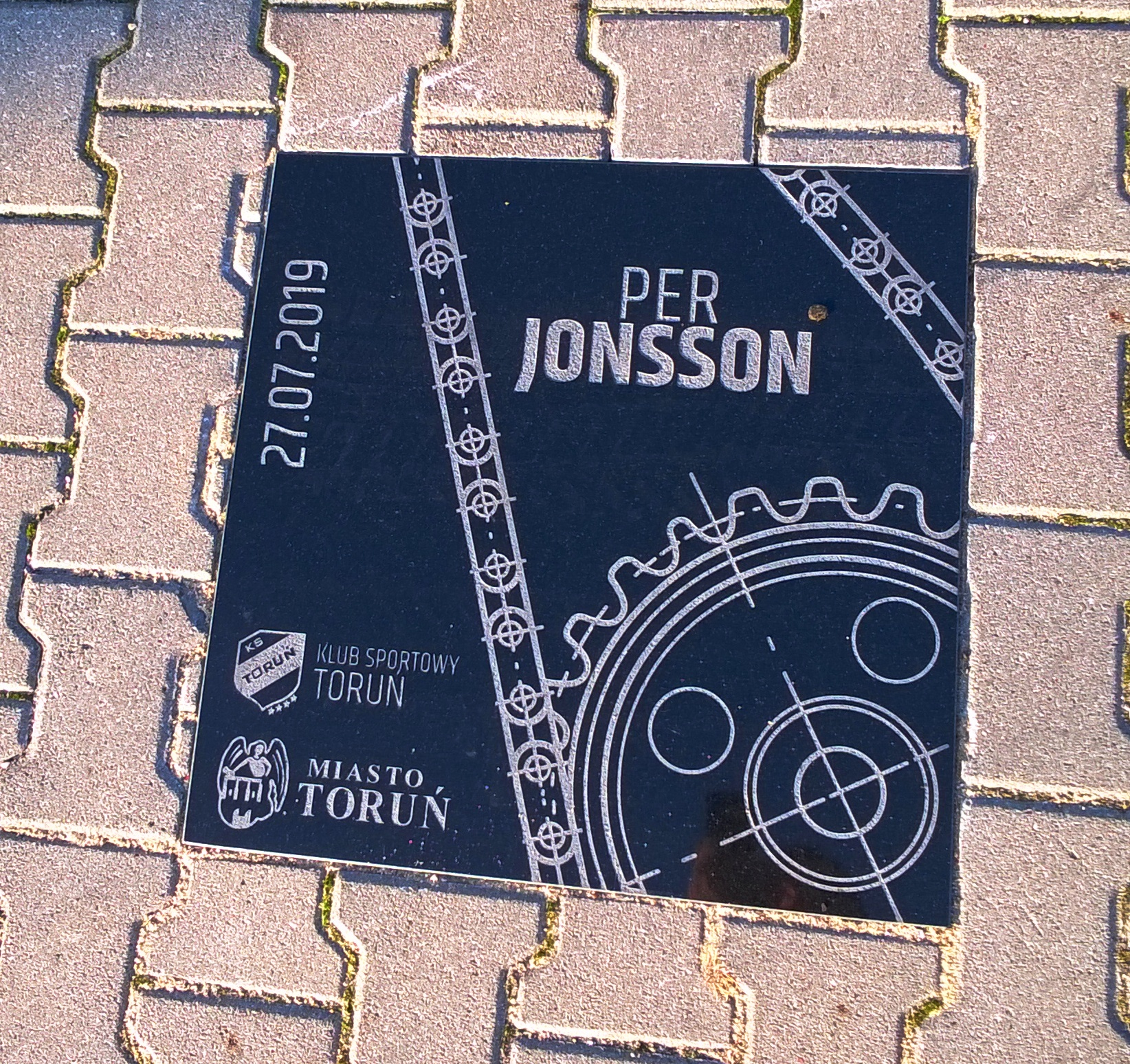
Street sign in Toruń

His career was cut short when a crash during a league meeting in Poland in 1994 left him using a wheelchair for the rest of his life. In recognition of his contribution to the city of Toruń, in April 2010 one of the streets was named after him.

== World final appearances ==
=== Individual World Championship ===
- 1987 – (Netherlands) Amsterdam, Olympic Stadium – 5th – 22pts
- 1988 – (Denmark) Vojens, Speedway Center – 5th – 9pts
- 1990 – (England) Bradford, Odsal Stadium – Winner – 13pts+3pts
- 1991 – (Sweden) Gothenburg, Ullevi – 9th – 7pts
- 1992 – (Poland) Wrocław, Olympic Stadium – 2nd – 11pts
- 1993 – (Germany) Pocking, Rottalstadion – 9th – 7pts

=== World Pairs Championship ===
- 1985 – (Poland) Rybnik, Rybnik Municipal Stadium (with Jan Andersson) – 5th – 14pts (4)
- 1988 – (England) Bradford, Odsal Stadium (with Jimmy Nilsen) – 5th – 29pts (12)
- 1989 – (Poland) Leszno, Alfred Smoczyk Stadium (with Jimmy Nilsen) – 2nd – 44pts (21)
- 1990 – (West Germany) Landshut, Ellermühle Stadium (with Jimmy Nilsen) – 4th – 33pts (16)
- 1991 – (Poland) Poznań, Olimpia Poznań Stadium (with Henrik Gustafsson / Jimmy Nilsen) – 2nd – 24pts (7)
- 1992 – (Italy) Lonigo, Santa Marina Stadium (with Henrik Gustafsson / Tony Rickardsson) – 3rd – 22pts (14)
- 1993 – (Denmark) Vojens, Speedway Center (with Tony Rickardsson / Henrik Gustafsson) – Winner – 26pts (5)

=== World Team Cup ===
- 1985 – USA Long Beach, Veterans Memorial Stadium (with Jan Andersson / Jimmy Nilsen / Tommy Nilsson / Pierre Brannefors) – 4th – 10pts (0)
- 1986 – (Sweden) Göteborg, Ullevi, (Denmark) Vojens, Speedway Center and (England) Bradford, Odsal Stadium (with Jan Andersson / Jimmy Nilsen / Tommy Nilsson / Erik Stenlund / Tony Olsson) – 4th – 73pts (21)
- 1988 – USA Long Beach, Veterans Memorial Stadium (with Conny Ivarsson / Tony Olsson / Jimmy Nilsen / Henrik Gustafsson) – 3rd – 22+3pts (9+3)
- 1989 – (England) Bradford, Odsal Stadium (with Mikael Blixt / Tony Olsson / Erik Stenlund / Jimmy Nilsen) – 3rd – 30pts (8)
- 1991 – (Denmark) Vojens, Speedway Center (with Tony Rickardsson / Henrik Gustafsson / Jimmy Nilsen / Peter Nahlin) – 2nd – 30pts (9)
- 1992 – (Sweden) Kumla, Kumla Speedway (with Tony Rickardsson / Henrik Gustafsson / Jimmy Nilsen / Peter Nahlin) – 2nd – 33pts (11)
- 1993 – (England) Coventry, Brandon Stadium (with Peter Karlsson / Henrik Gustafsson / Tony Rickardsson / Peter Nahlin) – 3rd – 28pts (7)

=== Individual Under-21 World Championship ===
- 1985 – (West Germany) Abensberg, Abensberg Motorstadion – Winner – 15pts

== Family ==
Jonsson's son Dennis rode for Lakeside Hammers in the 2016 Elite League but retired from speedway following a serious accident when riding for Marsana in Sweden.
