= Huddinge Motorstadion =

Stadium in Huddinge, Sweden

- Location: Holmträskvägen 27, 141 91 Huddinge, Sweden
- Coordinates: 59°10′11″N 17°58′56″E
- Operator: Eldarna motorcycle speedway

Huddinge Motorstadion is a motorcycle speedway track in Huddinge, Sweden. The facility is located approximately 8 kilometres south of Huddinge, in a remote area called Gladö on the Holmträskvägen. The facility hosts the speedway club Eldarna, who previously had a team that competed in the Swedish Speedway Team Championship.

== History ==
The stadium has hosted important events, including Swedish qualifying rounds of the Speedway World Championship in 1988.

The Eldarna speedway team won the third division on five occasions (1969, 1976, 1979, 1983 and 2003). The team last raced in the league during the 2010 Swedish speedway season but although no team has featured at the stadium since then, the facilities remain open for club activities.
