= Alan Rivett =

Speedway rider

- Born: 21 March 1956 (age 70); Whangārei, New Zealand
- Nationality: New Zealander /Australian

Career history
- 1984: Peterborough Panthers
- 1986-1989: Exeter Falcons
- 1986: King's Lynn Stars
- 1989: Long Eaton Invaders
- 1990: Berwick Bandits

Team honours
- 1988: Speedway World Pairs Championship finalist

Alan Rivett (born 21 March 1956) is a former international speedway rider from Australia. He earned 9 caps for the Australia national speedway team and one cap for the New Zealand national speedway team.

== Speedway career ==
Rivett reached the final of the Speedway World Pairs Championship in the 1988 Speedway World Pairs Championship. Despite riding for Australia, he was called up to replace injured New Zealand rider David Bargh in the final.

Rivett started his British leagues career for Peterborough Panthers in 1984 but was then subject to an argument between Peterborough and Mildenhall Fen Tigers for his signature for the 1985 season. In 1986, he joined the Exeter Falcons.

At the 1986 Australian Individual Speedway Championship, Rivett won the bronze medal.

== World Final appearances ==
=== World Pairs Championship ===
- 1988 - (England) Bradford, Odsal Stadium (with Mitch Shirra) - 4th - 32pts
