= Tony Olsson =

Swedish speedway rider

- Born: 13 March 1965 (age 61); Visby, Sweden
- Nationality: Swedish

Career history

Sweden
- 1982–1992, 1996–1998: Bysarna
- 1993–1995: Smederna

Great Britain
- 1986–1990, 1993, 1995–1996: Reading Racers
- 1991, 1994: Swindon Robins
- 1992: Belle Vue Aces
- 1992: Exeter Falcons
- 1992: Ipswich Witches

Individual honours
- 1994: Div 2 League Riders' runner-up

Team honours
- 1990, 1992: British League Champions
- 1990: British League KO Cup Winners
- 1993: Premiership Winners
- 1992: BSPA Cup Winners
- 1993: British League Fours Champions
- 1994: British League Div. 2 Pairs Champion
- 1988: Swedish Elitserien Champion
- 1988: Swedish Pairs Champion
- 1985: Allsvenskan Div 1 Champion

John Tony Olsson (born 13 March 1965 in Visby) is a Swedish former international motorcycle speedway rider. He was a member of the Swedish team that finished third in the 1988 and 1989 World Team Cup finals. He earned 26 caps for the Sweden national speedway team.

== Career ==
Born on the Norland Island Gotland, Olsson began his career with the club Bysarna. In 1982, he made his debut for the senior team and already 1983 he won Rider of the season. He twice finished runner-up in the Swedish Under-21 Championship in 1984 and 1985. One year later in 1986, Olsson finished runner-up in the World Under-21 Championship, despite suffering an engine failure in one heat. In 1988, he played a huge part in Bysarna becoming Swedish champions. The same year, he won the Swedish Pairs Championship with former World Champion Per Jonsson. In 1991, he won it again with Dennis Löfqvist. In 1989, Olsson became the only Swedish rider to qualify for the World Final in Munich. In the only World Final of his career, he finished in eighth place.

Olsson rode in the United Kingdom for the Reading Racers from 1986, where he became the team captain and then onto the Swindon Robins for a year in 1991 after he was forced out of Reading's line-up due to average restrictions after winning the British League Championship in 1990. After riding for Exeter Falcons in 1992 he returned in 1993, after a loan spell with Belle Vue Aces and was part of the Reading team that won the Fours championship.

In 1994, whilst on loan again to the Swindon Robins, Olsson won the British League Division Two Pairs Championship, partnering Tony Langdon.

Olsson returned to the Racers in 1995 and in his final season in 1996 he was voted 'Rider of the Year' by the Reading fans.

== Retirement ==
After his retirement, Olsson became the team manager of Sweden. As team manager, he won the Speedway World Championship in 2003 and 2004.

Olsson now works as Race Director in the Speedway Grand Prix.

== World Final Appearances ==
=== Individual World Championship ===
- 1989 - (Germany) Munich, Olympic Stadium - 8th - 8pts

=== World Team Cup ===
- 1986 - (England) Bradford, Odsal Stadium (with Per Jonsson / Erik Stenlund / Jimmy Nilsen / Jan Andersson) - 4th - 73pts (0)
- 1988 - USA Long Beach, Veterans Memorial Stadium (with Conny Ivarsson / Henrik Gustafsson / Jimmy Nilsen / Per Jonsson) - 3rd - 22pts (4)
- 1989 - (England) Bradford, Odsal Stadium (with Mikael Blixt / Per Jonsson / Jimmy Nilsen / Erik Stenlund) - 3rd - 30pts (7)
