= Lubomír Jedek =

Czech speedway rider

- Born: 21 June 1962 (age 64); Gottwaldov, Czechoslovakia
- Nationality: Czech

Career history

Czechoslovakia/Rep
- 1984–1989: Rudá Hvězda Praha
- 1990–1994: Olymp Praha
- 1991: Březolupy

Poland
- 1990–1991: Unia Tarnów
- 1992: Grudziądz

Individual honours
- 1986, 1991: Czechoslovak Championship bronze

Lubomír Jedek, also known as Luboš Jedek (born 21 June 1962), is a Czech former motorcycle speedway rider. He was capped by the Czechoslovak national speedway team.

== Career ==
Jedek came to prominence in 1981 after reaching the final of the 1981 Individual Speedway Junior European Championship. He competed in the individual championships of Czechoslovakia and the Czech Republic from 1981 until 1998, winning bronze medals in 1986 and 1991.

Jedek also raced longtrack and competed in the final of the 1987 Individual Long Track World Championship. That same year, he represented the Czechoslovak national team during the final of the 1987 Speedway World Team Cup.

Jedek raced in the Team Speedway Polish Championship from 1991 to 1992. Although he did not race in the British leagues, he toured the United Kingdom in 1986.

== World final appearances ==
=== World Team Cup ===
- 1987 - (Denmark) Fredericia, Fredericia Speedway, (England) Coventry, Brandon Stadium, (Czechoslovakia) Prague, Markéta Stadium (with Antonín Kasper Jr. / Roman Matoušek / Petr Vandírek / Zdeněk Schneiderwind) - 4th - 36pts (10)
