= Petr Vandírek =

Czech speedway rider

- Born: 7 April 1962 (age 64); Czechoslovakia
- Nationality: Czech

Career history
- 1979: AMK Čakovice
- 1984–1989: Rudá Hvězda Praha
- 1990–1991: Olymp Praha

Great Britain
- 1995–1996: Exeter Falcons

Individual honours
- 1986, 1987, 1988, 1989, 1990: World Longtrack finalist
- 1989: Czech Champion

Petr Vandírek (born 7 April 1962) is a Czech former speedway rider. He earned 32 international caps for the Czechoslovakia national speedway team and one cap for the Czech Republic national speedway team.

== Speedway career ==
Vandírek reached five Individual Speedway Long Track World Championship finals from 1986 until 1990, and won the 1989 Czech Republic Individual Speedway Championship.

On 21 May 1983, Vandírek set a new track record at the Letňa Avia, in Čakovice of 1:12.1 min.

Nine years before he rode in Britain, Vandírek toured the United Kingdom in 1986. He then rode in the top tier of British Speedway riding for Exeter Falcons from 1995 until 1996.

In 1987, Vandírek represented the Czechoslovak national team during the final of the 1987 Speedway World Team Cup.

== World final appearances ==
=== World Team Cup ===
- 1987 - (Denmark) Fredericia, Fredericia Speedway, (England) Coventry, Brandon Stadium, (Czechoslovakia) Prague, Markéta Stadium (with Antonín Kasper Jr. / Roman Matoušek / Lubomír Jedek / Zdeněk Schneiderwind) - 4th - 36pts (10)
