= Tommy Dunker =

German speedway rider (1969–2024)

- Born: 26 June 1969; Neumünster, West Germany
- Died: 4 July 2024 (aged 55)
- Nationality: German

Career history

West Germany
- 1985: MC Norden
- 1987–1991: Diedenbergen

Germany
- 1997: Landshut

Poland
- 1991: Opole

Individual honours
- 1997: Long Track World Champion

Tommy Dunker (26 June 1969 – 4 July 2024) was a German speedway rider.

== Biography ==
Dunker competed in speedway, longtrack and grasstrack racing. He competed in the first One World Longtrack world championship Grand-Prix series in 1997 and won the title.

Although Dunker was best known for longtrack, he finished fifth in the 1987 Individual Speedway Junior European Championship final after winning his qualifying round and reached the final of the 1988 Speedway World Pairs Championship.

Dunker died on 4 July 2024, at the age of 55.

== World Longtrack Championship ==
=== Grand-Prix Years ===
- 1997 5 app (Champion) 89pts

=== Best World Longtrack Grand-Prix result ===
- (Germany) Pfarrkirchen First 1997

=== Semi-finals ===
- 1991 (Germany) Scheeßel (9th) 10pts
- 1996 (Germany) Pfarrkirchen (14th) 3pts
- 1998 (Czech Republic) Mariánské Lázně (N/S)

=== Qualifying round ===
- 1988 (Germany) Herxheim (16th) 1pt
- 1988 (Germany) Harsewinkel (N/S)

== World final appearances ==
=== World Pairs Championship ===
- 1988 - (England) Bradford, Odsal Stadium (with Gerd Riss) - 8th - 21pts (4)
