= Paolo Salvatelli =

Italian motorcycle speedway rider

- Born: 14 October 1962 (age 64); Macerata, Italy
- Nationality: Italian

Career history

Great Britain
- 1988: Ipswich Witches

Individual honours
- 1987, 1992, 2003: Italian Championship bronze

Paolo Salvatelli is an Italian motorcycle speedway rider who was a member of Italy national speedway team at the 2004 Speedway World Cup and earned 20 international caps.

== Career ==
In 1988, Salvatelli made his debut in the British leagues, when appearing for Ipswich Witches during the 1998 season but his season was cut short after he injured his shoulder ligaments.

Salvatelli won the bronze medal on three separate occasions at the Italian Individual Speedway Championship in 1987, 1992 and 2003.
