= Antal Kocso =

Hungarian speedway rider

- Born: 22 December 1962 (age 63); Szeged, Hungary
- Nationality: Hungarian

Career history

Great Britain
- 1989, 1992, 1993: Bradford Dukes

Poland
- 1991-1993: Gorzów

Individual honours
- 1988: Speedway World Championship finalist

Antal Kocso (born 22 December 1962) is a former international speedway rider from Hungary. He earned 18 caps for the Hungary national speedway team.

== Speedway career ==
Kocso reached the final of the Speedway World Championship in the 1988 Individual Speedway World Championship.

Kocso rode in the top tier of British Speedway from 1989-1993, riding for Bradford Dukes. Bradford signed him following an impressive showing at the 1988 Speedway World Pairs Championship at Odsal, where he scored 15 points.

Kocso was a member of the Hungarian national team that toured the United Kingdom in 1991 and competed in the last Speedway World Pairs Championship] at the 1993 Speedway World Pairs Championship in Vojens, Denmark.

Kocso has been on the podium three times during the Hungarian National Championships.

== World final appearances ==
=== Individual World Championship ===
- 1988 - (Denmark) Vojens, Speedway Center - 11th - 6pts

=== World Pairs Championship ===
- 1988 - (England) Bradford, Odsal Stadium (with Zoltán Adorján) - 6th - 25pts
- 1989 - (Poland) Leszno, Alfred Smoczyk Stadium (with Zoltán Adorján) - 6th - 22pts
- 1993 - (Denmark) Vojens, Speedway Center (with József Petrikovics / Zoltán Adorján) - 7th - 10pts
