= Antonín Kasper Jr. =

Czech motorcycle speedway rider

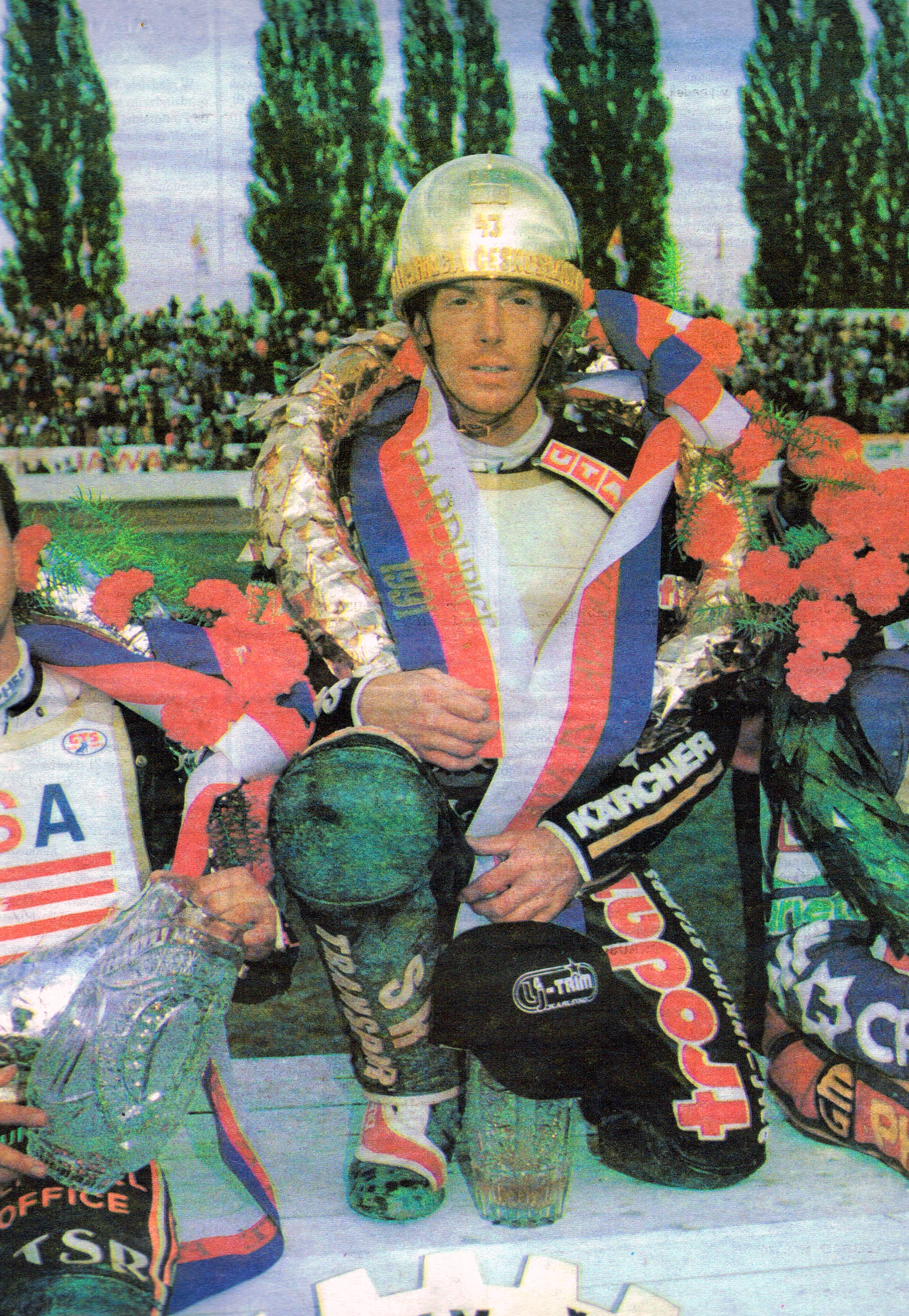
- Toni as the 1991 Golden Helmet of Pardubice winner
- Born: 5 December 1962; Prague, Czechoslovakia
- Died: 31 July 2006 (aged 43)
- Nationality: Czech

Career history

Czechoslovakia/Rep
- 1982–1989: Rudá Hvězda Praha
- 1990–1994: Olymp Praha

Great Britain
- 1982–1983: Hackney Hawks
- 1984: Eastbourne Eagles

Poland
- 1990–1991: Lublin
- 1992–1996, 2000–2002: Gniezno
- 1997–1999: Rzeszów

Sweden
- 1991–1992, 1996–1998: Karlstad
- 1999–2002: Masarna

Denmark
- 2001: Brovst

Individual honours
- 1998: Continental Champion
- 1982: European Junior Champion
- 1991: Golden Helmet of Pardubice (CZE)

Team honours
- 2000: Elitserien Champion

Antonín Kasper (5 December 1962 – 31 July 2006) also known as Toni Kasper during his racing career, was a Czech motorcycle speedway rider. He appeared in four Speedway World Championship finals and featured in four Speedway Grand Prix series. He earned 42 international caps for the Czechoslovakia national speedway team and 15 caps for the Czech Republic national speedway team.

== Career ==
Kasper won the 1982 European Under-21 Championship at the Rottalstadion in Pocking, West Germany. He won the title, after finishing on 14 points. He then joined Hackney Hawks in the British leagues and rode for them in 1982 and 1983.

In 1987, Kasper represented the Czechoslovak national team during the final of the 1987 Speedway World Team Cup.

On 25 July 1998, Kasper won the Continental Final, which formed part of the 1999 Speedway Grand Prix Qualification.

Kasper rode in the United Kingdom for the Hackney Hawks from 1982 until their closure the following season at the end of 1983. He rode for Karlstad in Sweden in 1991.

In 2005, Kasper was diagnosed with cancer, and he died in 2006.

As a child actor, Kasper appeared in two Czech films.

== Family ==
Kasper's father Antonín Sr. also appeared in Speedway World Championship finals.

== World Final appearances ==
=== Individual World Championship ===
- 1983 – (West Germany) Norden, Motodrom Halbemond – 14th – 3 points
- 1986 – (Poland) Chorzów, Silesian Stadium – 15th – 2 pts
- 1987 – (Netherlands) Amsterdam Olympic Stadium – 12th – 9 pts
- 1990 – (England) Bradford, Odsal Stadium – 15th – 2 pts

=== World Team Cup ===
- 1982 – (England) London, White City Stadium (with Jiří Štancl / Aleš Dryml / Václav Verner / Petr Ondrašík) – 4th – 17 pts (0)
- 1983 – (Denmark) Vojens, Speedway Center (with Jiří Štancl / Aleš Dryml / Václav Verner / Petr Ondrašík) – 4th – 3 pts (0)
- 1987 - (Denmark) Fredericia, Fredericia Speedway, (England) Coventry, Brandon Stadium, (Czechoslovakia) Prague, Markéta Stadium (with Roman Matoušek / Petr Vandírek / Lubomír Jedek / Zdeněk Schneiderwind) - 4th - 36pts (10)

=== World Pairs Championship ===
- 1986 - (West Germany) Pocking, Rottalstadion (with Roman Matoušek) – 3rd – 32pts (22)
- 1987 - (Czechoslovakia) Pardubice, Svítkov Stadion (with Roman Matoušek) – 5th – 30 pts

== Speedway Grand Prix results ==
Year	Position	Points	Best finish	Notes
1998	12th	50	5th	5th in Danish GP
1999	15th	39	5th	5th Polish GP
2000	17th	32	12th	
2001	23rd	11	17th	Rode in only 3 GPs
