= Roman Matoušek =

Czech speedway rider (1964–2020)

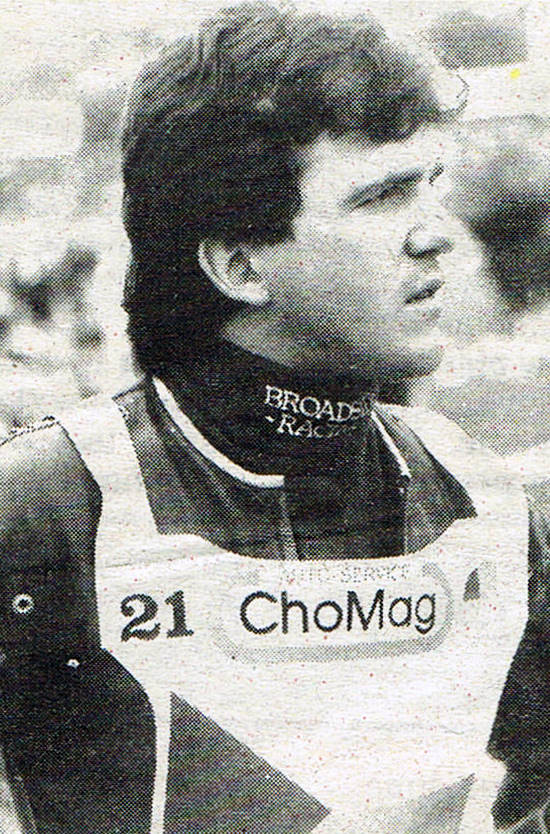
- Born: 23 May 1964; Slaný, Czechoslovakia
- Died: 8 January 2020 (aged 55)
- Nationality: Czech

Career history

Czechoslovakia
- 1984–1989: Rudá Hvězda Praha
- 1990–1991: Olymp Praha

Great Britain
- 1986: Ipswich Witches
- 1989–1991: Coventry Bees
- 1993–1996: Sheffield Tigers

Individual honours
- 1988: Czech Republic Championship

Team honours
- 1986: Speedway World Pairs Championship bronze medal

Roman Matoušek (23 May 1964 – 8 January 2020) was a Czech speedway rider. He earned 26 international caps for the Czechoslovakia national speedway team.

== Speedway career ==
Matoušek was the champion of the Czechoslovakia, winning the Czechoslovak Individual Speedway Championship in 1988.

Matoušek rode in the top tier of British Speedway from 1986, when he joined Ipswich Witches. He later rode for Coventry Bees despite a failed bid by Bradford Dukes. and Sheffield Tigers.

In 1987, Matoušek represented the Czechoslovak national team during the final of the 1987 Speedway World Team Cup.

== World Final appearances ==
=== Individual World Championship ===
- 1987 - (Netherlands) Amsterdam, Olympic Stadium - 15th - 5pts

=== World Pairs Championship ===
- 1986 – (West Germany) Pocking, Rottalstadion (with Antonín Kasper Jr.) – 3rd – 32pts (10)
- 1987 – (Czech Republic) Pardubice, Svítkov Stadion (with Antonín Kasper Jr.) – 5th – 30 pts
- 1991 – (Poland) Poznań, Olimpia Poznań Stadium (with Zdeněk Tesař and Bohumil Brhel) – 5th – 18pts (12)

=== World Team Cup ===
- 1987 - (Denmark) Fredericia, Fredericia Speedway, (England) Coventry, Brandon Stadium, (Czechoslovakia) Prague, Markéta Stadium (with Antonín Kasper Jr. / Petr Vandírek / Lubomír Jedek / Zdeněk Schneiderwind) - 4th - 36pts (10)

=== Ice World Championship ===
- 1986 – (Sweden) Stockholm – 18th – 2pts
