= Conny Ivarsson =

Swedish speedway rider

- Born: 15 April 1965 (age 61); Vetlanda, Sweden
- Nationality: Swedish

Career history

Sweden
- 1982-2002: Njudungarna/Vetlanda
- 2001: Bysarna

Great Britain
- 1987: Swindon Robins

Denmark
- 1990: SaeSK Saeby

Individual honours
- 1988: Speedway World Championship finalist

Team honours
- 1986, 1987: Elitserien Champion
- 2002: Allsvenskan Champion

Conny Ivarsson (born 15 April 1965) is a Swedish former speedway rider. He earned 40 caps for the Sweden national speedway team.

== Speedway career ==
Ivarsson was a leading speedway rider during the 1980s. He reached the final of the Speedway World Championship in the 1988 Individual Speedway World Championship.

Ivarsson rode in the top tier of British Speedway during the 1987 British League season, riding for Swindon Robins.

== Family ==
Ivarsson's brother Claes was also an international speedway rider.
