= 1993 Individual Speedway World Championship =

World motorcycle speedway competition

Seasons
- ← 1992 1994 →

The 1993 Individual Speedway World Championship was the 48th edition of the official World Championship to determine the world champion rider.

"Sudden" Sam Ermolenko of the United States won his only Speedway World Championship to become the first American winner since Bruce Penhall in 1982. Triple World Champion Hans Nielsen finished second with England's Chris Louis finishing third.

== First round ==
=== British qualifiers ===
- Top 32 to British-Semi finals

== Second round ==
=== British semi-finals ===
- Top 16 to British final

=== Australian qualification ===
Date	Championship	Venue	Winner	2nd	3rd
?	Victorian	Olympic Park, Mildura	Mark Lemon	Leigh Adams	Jason Lyons
?	Queensland	Townsville Speedway, Townsville	Troy Butler	Tony Langdon	Mark Carlson
?	Northern Territory	Tennant Creek Speedway	Wayne Bridgeford	Glen Baxter	Wayne Lorymer
?	South Australian	North Arm Speedway, Gillman	Scott Norman	Shane Bowes	Shane Parker
12 Jan	New South Wales	Newcastle Motordrome, Tomago	Craig Boyce	Mick Poole	Stephen Davies
?	West Australian	Claremont Speedway, Perth	Glenn Doyle	Craig Hodgson	David Cheshire

== Third round ==
=== Continental Preliminary round ===
Date	Venue	Winner	2nd	3rd
25 April	(Slovenia) Ilirija Sports Park, Ljubljana	(Slovenia) Gregor Pintar	(Italy) Paolo Salvatelli	(Russia) Anatoly Khlynov
25 April	(Poland) Tarnów Municipal Stadium, Tarnów	(Poland) Jacek Rempala	(Russia) Rif Saitgareev	(Poland) Dariusz Stenka
25 April	(France) Marmande Speedway, Marmande	(Germany) Marvyn Cox	(Poland) Marek Hucko	(Czech Republic) Tomáš Topinka
25 April	(Germany) Ludwigslust Speedway, Ludwigslust	(Hungary) Csaba Hell	(Italy) Armando Castagna	(Austria) Toni Pilotto

=== British Final ===
- Top 10 to Commonwealth final plus 1 reserve

=== Swedish qualification ===
- Top 8 in each heat to Swedish final

(2 May, Gubbängens IP, Stockholm)
Pos	Rider	Points
1	Tony Rickardsson	15
2	Per Jonsson	14
3	Mikael Karlsson	12
4	Dennis Löfqvist	11
5	Niklas Klingberg	11
6	Robert Johansson	9
7	Conny Ivarsson	8+3
8	Stefan Dannö	8+2
9	Christer Rohlén	8+1
10	Jimmy Engman	7
11	Mikael Teurnberg	5
12	Joakim Karlsson	4
13	Raymond Smedh	4
14	Robert Eriksson	2
15	Göran Flood	2
16	Jörgen Hultgren	0
17	Frank Richt (res)	0

(2 May, Ljungheden, Västervik)
Pos	Rider	Points
1	Claes Ivarsson	14
2	Henrik Gustafsson	13
3	Kenneth Nyström	11
4	Jimmy Nilsen	11
5	Peter Karlsson	10
6	Peter Nahlin	10
7	Stefan Andersson	8
8	Kenneth Lindby	8
9	Marcus Andersson	7
10	Tony Olsson	7
11	Niklas Karlsson	5
12	Stefan Ekberg	3
13	Anders Kling	3
14	Patrik Olsson	3
15	Jonathan Forsgren	3
16	Magnus Zetterström	2
17	Tony Zetterström (res)	2
18	Mikael Olsson (res)	0

=== Australian Final ===
- First 4 to Commonwealth Final plus 1 reserve

=== New Zealand Final ===
- 31 Mar 1993
- (New Zealand) Ruapuna Speedway, Christchurch
- First 2 to Commonwealth Final

Pos.	Rider	Total
1	Mark Thorpe	15
2	Mark Lyndon	14
3	Andy Waker	13
4	Craig Wilkie	11
5	Daniel Ornsby	10
6	Paul Atkins	9
7	Justin Monk	9
8	Mike Wilson	9
9	Jacqui Mauger	6
10	Rhys Hamburger	6
11	Daniel Burbery	5
12	Steve Mudgway	4
13	Scott Boyce	4
14	Graham Hartshome	0
15	Mark Jamiesson	0
16	Darrin Wilson	0

== Fourth round ==
=== Continental Quarter-finals ===
- Top 32 to Continental semi-finals

Date	Venue	Winner	2nd	3rd
22 May	(Germany) Ellermühle Speedway Stadium, Landshut	(Poland) Jacek Krzyzaniak	(Hungary) Antal Kocso	(Hungary) Robert Nagy
22 May	(Austria) Stadion Wiener Neustadt	(Italy) Armando Castagna	(Poland) Dariusz Stenka	(Hungary) Zoltán Adorján
23 May	(Poland) Speedway Stadium, Gorzów	(Poland) Tomasz Gollob	(Poland) Piotr Świst	(Czech Republic) Antonín Kasper, Jr.
23 May	(Hungary) Cserénfa Speedway, Cserénfa	(Hungary) Zoltán Hajdú	(Hungary) László Bódi	(Italy) Paolo Salvatelli

=== Commonwealth Final ===
- First 11 to Overseas Final plus 1 reserve

=== American Final ===
- (United States) top 5 to Overseas final plus 1 reserve

=== Danish Final ===
- (Denmark) 2 rounds, top 5 to Nordic Final plus 1 reserve
- R1 (29 May, Fladbro Speedway, Randers)
- R2 (31 May, Fjelsted Speedway Stadium, Harndrup)
- Gert Handberg seeded to Nordic Final

Pos.	Rider	Scores	Total
1	Hans Nielsen		28
2	Tommy Knudsen		27
3	John Jørgensen		22
4	Brian Karger		21
5	Jan Staechmann		21
6	Hans Clausen		17
7	Jacob Olsen		15
8	Kenneth Arnfred		14
9	Peter Ravn		13
10	Tom P. Knudsen		13
11	Ole Hansen		11
12	Ronni Pedersen		10
13	Morten Andersen		10
14	Kurt Hansen		8
15	Allan Johansen		4
16	Lars - Henrik Jorgensen		2

=== Norwegian Final ===
- (Norway) Elgane Speedway, Elgane
- 6 Sep '92, top 1 (+1 nomination) to Nordic final

Pos.	Rider	Total
1	Lars Gunnestad	14+3
2	Arnt Forland	14+2
3	Rune Holta	12+3
4	Odd Pettersen	12+2
5	Einar Kyllingstad	12+1
6	Robert Langeland	9
7	Atle Knutse	8
8	Ronny Erga	7
9	Ingvar Hvamstad	7
10	Ingvar Skoglund	6
11	John A. Pollestad	5
12	Eivind Reppen	5
13	Jorn Arve Ardal	3
14	Gjermund Aas	3
15	Björn Arild Tonnesen	2
16	Jan Arild Slatta	1

=== Finland Final ===
- (Finland) Vauhtipuisto, Hyvinkää
- 23 Aug '92, top 2 to Nordic final

Pos.	Rider	Total
1	Vesa Ylinen	15
2	Roy Malminheimo	13
3	Arto Orjo	12
4	Petri Nurmesniemi	11
5	Mika Pellinen	10
6	Kai Laukkanen	10
7	Petri Vaatsio	10
8	Tomi Havu	9
9	Janne Koivula	7
10	Aarre Soivuori	6
11	Petri Kokko	4
12	Jarno Kosonen	3
13	Petri Hyvönen	2
14	Kai Pohjasniemi	1
15	Marko Jumisko (res)	2
16	Marko Laine (res)	2
17	Tomi Kalliomäki (res)	2
18	Mika Laukkanen	1
19	Jyri Viemerö	1

=== Swedish Final ===
- R1 (11 May, Grevby Motorstadion, Mariestad)
- R2 (12 May, Norrköping Motorstadion, Norrköping)
- R3 (13 May, Orionparken, Hallstavik)
- (Sweden) - 3 rounds, top 5 to Nordic Final plus 1 reserve

Pos.	Rider	Scores	Total
1	Henrik Gustafsson	11+14+15	40
2	Per Jonsson	14+12+13	39
3	Tony Rickardsson	12+14+11	37
4	Jimmy Nilsen	13+9+13	35
5	Peter Karlsson	10+10+12	32
6	Stefan Andersson	7+10+10	27
7	Peter Nahlin	9+10+6	25
8	Claes Ivarsson	9+6+7	22
9	Dennis Löfqvist	5+8+9	22
10	Niklas Klingberg	5+5+6	16
11	Conny Ivarsson	3+6+6	15
12	Stefan Dannö	6+7+2	15
13	Kenneth Lindby	5+4+5	14
14	Mikael Karlsson	7+1+ns	8
15	Marcus Andersson (Res)	ns+1+4	5
16	Robert Johansson	2+1+1	4
17	Kenneth Nyström	2+0+ns	2
18	Christer Rohlén (Res)	ns+0+ns	0

== Fifth round ==
=== Overseas Final ===
- First 9 plus 1 reserve to World Semi-final

=== Nordic Final ===
- 13 June 1993
- (Finland) Seinäjoki Speedway, Seinäjoki
- First 9 plus 1 reserve to World Semi-final

Pos.	Rider	Total
1	(Denmark) Tommy Knudsen	14
2	(Sweden) Per Jonsson	13
3	(Sweden) Tony Rickardsson	12
4	(Denmark) Brian Karger	11
5	(Sweden) Peter Karlsson	10
6	(Denmark) Hans Nielsen	9
7	(Sweden) Henrik Gustafsson	9
8	(Denmark) John Jørgensen	9
9	(Denmark) Gert Handberg	7
10	(Sweden) Jimmy Nilsen	6
11	(Denmark) Hans Clausen	5
12	(Norway) Einar Kyllingstad	4
13	(Finland) Roy Malminheimo	2
14	(Denmark) Jan Staechmann	2
15	(Norway) Lars Gunnestad	2
16	(Finland) Vesa Ylinen	1
Res	(Sweden) Peter Nahlin	ns
Res	(Norway) Rune Holta	ns

=== Continental Semi-finals ===
- 12 June
- (Czech Republic) Markéta Stadium, Prague
- Top 7 to World semi-final

Pos.	Rider	Points
1	(Italy) Armando Castagna	13
2	(Hungary) Zoltán Adorján	12
3	(Hungary) Antal Kocso	11
4	(Czech Republic) Bohumil Brhel	10
5	(Poland) Jacek Krzyzaniak	10
6	(Poland) Slawomir Drabik	9
7	(Germany) Gerd Riss	9
8	(Hungary) Róbert Nagy	8+3
9	(Czech Republic) Petr Vandírek	8+2
10	(Poland) Dariusz Stenka	8+1
11	(Czech Republic) Roman Matoušek	6
12	(Hungary) József Petrikovics	5
13	(Poland) Jaroslaw Olszewski	4
14	(Latvia) Nikolaj Kokins	3
15	(Poland) Mirosław Kowalik	3
16	(Poland) Jacek Rempala	1

- 14 June
- (Poland) Zielona Góra Speedway Stadium, Zielona Góra
- Top 7 to World semi-final

Pos.	Rider	Points
1	(Poland) Tomasz Gollob	12+3
2	(Poland) Piotr Swist	12+2
3	(Germany) Marvyn Cox*	11
4	(Czech Republic) Václav Milík Sr.	10
5	(Czech Republic) Antonín Kasper Jr.	10
6	(Hungary) Zoltan Hajdu	9
7	(Poland) Piotr Paluch	9
8	(Hungary) Laszlo Bodi	8+3
9	(Russia) Mikhail Starostin	8+2
10	(Poland) Slawomir Dudek	8+1
11	(Poland) Krzysztof Kuczwalski	7
12	(Czech Republic) Tomáš Topinka	6
13	(Hungary) Zsolt Böszermenyi	5
14	(Russia) Flur Kalimulin	3
15	(Italy) Paolo Salvatelli	2
16	(Italy) Valentino Furlanetto	0
17	(Poland) Marek Hucko (res)	0

- Cox rode on a Polish licence

== Sixth round ==
=== World Semi-Finals ===
- 24 July 1993
- (Italy) Santa Marina Stadium, Lonigo
- First 8 to World final plus 1 reserve

Pos.	Rider	Points
1	(Denmark) Hans Nielsen	13+3
2	(United States) Billy Hamill	13+2
3	(United States) Greg Hancock	12
4	(Australia) Leigh Adams	11
5	(Italy) Armando Castagna	9
6	(England) Gary Havelock	9
7	(Germany) Gerd Riss	9
8	(England) Andy Smith	8+3
9	(Denmark) Brian Karger	8+2
10	(England) Martin Dugard	7
11	(Czech Republic) Antonín Kasper, Jr.	6
12	(Denmark) John Jørgensen	6
13	(Hungary) Zoltán Hajdú	6
14	(Poland) Sławomir Drabik	2
15	(Czech Republic) Václav Milík, Sr.	1
16	(Poland) Piotr Paluch	0
Res	(Hungary) Robert Nagy	0
Res	(Sweden) Jimmy Nilsen	0

- 6 August 1993
- (Sweden) Vetlanda Motorstadion, Vetlanda
- First 8 to World final plus 1 reserve

Pos.	Rider	Points
1	(England) Joe Screen	12
2	(Poland) Tomasz Gollob	11+3
3	(Sweden) Henrik Gustafsson	11+2
4	(Sweden) Tony Rickardsson	10
5	(United States) Sam Ermolenko	10
6	(Sweden) Per Jonsson	10
7	(England) Chris Louis	9+3
8	(Sweden) Peter Karlsson	9+2
9	(United States) Ronnie Correy	9+1
10	(Denmark) Tommy Knudsen	7
11	(Germany) Marvyn Cox	6
12	(Czech Republic) Bohumil Brhel	5
13	(Poland) Jacek Krzyzaniak	4
14	(Hungary) Zoltán Adorján	3
15	(Hungary) Antal Kocso	2
16	(Poland) Piotr Świst	1
Res	(Denmark) Hans Clausen	1
Res	(Hungary) László Bódi	0

== World Final ==
- 29 August 1993
- (Germany) Rottalstadion, Pocking

Placing	Rider	Total	1	2	3	4	5	6	7	8	9	10	11	12	13	14	15	16	17	18	19	20	Pts	Pos	21
1	(United States) (5) Sam Ermolenko	12		3			3					3					3					0	12	1	
2	(Denmark) (10) Hans Nielsen	11			3			3						2			0		3				11	2	3
3	(England) (13) Chris Louis	11				3	2							1		2					3		11	3	2
4	(Sweden) (4) Henrik Gustafsson	10	3							1				0				3				3	10	4	
5	(England) (16) Andy Smith	10				0				2	3						2			3			10	5	
6	(England) (14) Gary Havelock	10				2		2					3		1							2	10	6	
7	(Poland) (15) Tomasz Gollob	8				1			3			2						2	0				8	7	
8	(Sweden) (7) Peter Karlsson	8		2					0					3	2					1			8	8	
9	(Sweden) (8) Per Jonsson	7		0						3			2			1			1				7	9	
10	(United States) (3) Billy Hamill	7	2						1				1				1				2		7	10	
11	(Germany) (1) Gerd Riss	6	0				0				1				3				2				6	11	
12	(Italy) (2) Armando Castagna	5	1					0				1				3				0			5	12	
13	(England) (6) Joe Screen	5		1				1			2							0			1		5	13	
14	(Sweden) (11) Tony Rickardsson	4			1				2		0					0						1	4	14	
15	(Australia) (9) Leigh Adams	4			0		1						0					1		2			4	15	
16	(United States) (12) Greg Hancock	2			2					0		0			0						0		2	16	
R1	(United States) (R1) Ronnie Correy	0																					0	R1	
R2	(Denmark) (R2) Brian Karger	0																					0	R2	
Placing	Rider	Total	1	2	3	4	5	6	7	8	9	10	11	12	13	14	15	16	17	18	19	20	Pts	Pos	21

m - exclusion for exceeding two minute time allowance • t - exclusion for touching the tapes • x - other exclusion • e - retired or mechanical failure • f - fell • ns - non-starter • nc - non-classify

gate A - inside	gate B	gate C	gate D - outside
