= 1998 Speedway Grand Prix of Poland =

Information
- Date: 18 September 1998
- City: (Poland) Linköping
- Event: 6 of 6 (24)
- Referee: (Germany) Wolfgang Glas

Stadium details
- Stadium: Polonia Stadium
- Track: speedway track

SGP Results
- Best Time
- (gold) Winner: (Poland) Tomasz Gollob
- (silver) Runner-up: (Australia) Ryan Sullivan
- (bronze) 3rd place: (Sweden) Jimmy Nilsen

The 1998 Speedway Grand Prix of Poland was the sixth race of the 1998 Speedway Grand Prix season. It took place on 18 September in the Polonia Stadium in Bydgoszcz, Poland It was the fourth Polish SGP, but first in Bydgoszcz. Grand Prix was won by Pole Tomasz Gollob, who was riding for Polonia Bydgoszcz in Polish League. It was his third winning in GP history.

== Starting positions draw ==
The Speedway Grand Prix Commission nominated Antonín Kasper, Jr. (Czech Republic) and two Poles: Robert Dados (1998 Under-21 World Champion who qualify to the 1999 Speedway Grand Prix) and Jacek Gollob as Wild Card.

== Heat details ==
Placing	Draw	Rider	Total	Pre-Main Event										Main Event										Final Event
Placing	Draw	Rider	Total	Round 1						Round 2				Round 1						Round 2				1/2		CF	F
Placing	Draw	Rider	Total	1	2	3	4	5	6	7	8	9	10	11	12	13	14	15	16	17	18	19	20	21	22	23	24
1	5	(Poland) (3) Tomasz Gollob	25														2			1				1			1
2	7	(Australia) (9) Ryan Sullivan	20												1						2			2			2
3	4	(Sweden) (8) Jimmy Nilsen	18														1				3		1		2		3
4	9	(Denmark) (7) Hans Nielsen	16	1						1				2							1				1		4
5	6	(Australia) (15) Leigh Adams	15													2					4	1		3		1
6	8	(United Kingdom) (5) Mark Loram	14											3				2					2	4		2
7	13	(United Kingdom) (17) Andy Smith	12				2			3		2					3		2			2			4	3
8	1	(Sweden) (4) Tony Rickardsson	10											1						2					3	4
9	3	(United States) (1) Greg Hancock	8													1				3		3
10	11	(Australia) (10) Jason Crump	8			1				2					2					4			3
11	15	(Sweden) (14) Stefan Dannö	7		1						1				4			1				4
12	22	(Czech Republic) (22) Antonín Kasper, Jr.	7			3		1				1				4			1				4
13	2	(United Kingdom) (18) Chris Louis	6												3				3
14	19	(Sweden) (19) Henrik Gustafsson	6			2					3		2			3		3
15	12	(Italy) (11) Armando Castagna	5				1				2			4					4
16	16	(Australia) (16) Craig Boyce	5	3				2					1				4	4
Placing	Draw	Rider	Total	1	2	3	4	5	6	7	8	9	10	11	12	13	14	15	16	17	18	19	20	21	22	23	24
17	10	(Denmark) (6) Brian Andersen	4		3				1				3
18	24	(Poland) (24) Jacek Gollob	4	2							4	3
19	21	(Hungary) (12) Zoltan Adorjan	3				3		2			4R
20	18	(Poland) (13) Piotr Protasiewicz	3		2					4			4
21	20	(Denmark) (21) Jesper B. Jensen	2				4	3
22	17	(Poland) (20) Sebastian Ułamek	2	4					3
23	14	(United States) (2) Billy Hamill	1			4F			4N
24	23	(Poland) (23) Robert Dados	1		4			4

Heats 1-10: Pre-Main Event 1-4: First round 5-6: Last chance for second round 7-8: Second round 9-10: Last chance Main Event	Heats 11-20: Main Event 11-14: First round 15-16: Last chance for second round 17-18: Second round 19-20: Last chance for Semi-Finals	Heats 21-24: Final Event 21-22: Semi-Finals 23: Consolation Final 24: The Big Final

gate A – inside	gate B	gate C	gate D – outside

== The intermediate classification ==
Qualifies for next season's Grand Prix series
Full-time Grand Prix rider
Wild card, track reserve or qualified reserve

Pos.	Rider	Points	CZE (Czech Republic)	GER (Germany)	DEN (Denmark)	GBR (United Kingdom)	SWE (Sweden)	POL (Poland)
Gold	(Sweden) (4) Tony Rickardsson	111	25	25	18	8	25	10
Silver	(Sweden) (8) Jimmy Nilsen	99	18	20	8	20	15	18
Bronze	(Poland) (3) Tomasz Gollob	97	16	16	8	18	14	25
4	(Denmark) (7) Hans Nielsen	76	8	12	25	7	8	16
5	(United Kingdom) (18) Chris Louis	75	15	8	20	6	20	6
6	(United States) (1) Greg Hancock	69	6	10	14	15	16	8
7	(Australia) (9) Ryan Sullivan	68	12	7	3	16	10	20
8	(Australia) (10) Jason Crump	62 (+3)	3	3	16	25	7	8
9	(United States) (2) Billy Hamill	62 (+N)	20	18	6	12	5	1
10	(United Kingdom) (5) Mark Loram	52	6	7	10	7	8	14
11	(Australia) (15) Leigh Adams	51	10	6	4	4	12	15
12	(Czech Republic) (22) (23) (24) Antonín Kasper, Jr.	50	7	4	15	14	3	7
13	(Sweden) (14) Stefan Dannö	49	14	6	7	10	5	7
14	(United Kingdom) (17) Andy Smith	43	2	14	5	4	6	12
15	(Sweden) (19) Henrik Gustafsson	43	8	15	6	6	2	6
16	(Denmark) (6) Brian Andersen	31	5	–	7	8	7	4
17	(Sweden) (25) Peter Karlsson	27	1	8	–	–	18	–
18	(Italy) (11) Armando Castagna	23	1	5	3	3	6	5
19	(Hungary) (12) Zoltan Adorjan	21	7	5	2	3	1	3
20	(Australia) (16) Craig Boyce	18	3	4	1	1	4	5
21	(Poland) (13) Piotr Protasiewicz	16	2	1	5	2	3	3
22	(Denmark) (21) Jesper B. Jensen	14	4	–	1	5	2	2
23	(Denmark) (22) Brian Karger	12	–	–	12	–	–	–
24	(Poland) (20) Sebastian Ułamek	10	–	1	2	1	4	2
25	(Germany) (22) (24) Gerd Riss	6	4	2	–	–	–	–
26	(Czech Republic) (23) Bohumil Brhel	5	5	–	–	–	–	–
26	(United Kingdom) (23) Joe Screen	5	–	–	–	5	–	–
28	(Norway) (24) Lars Gunnestad	5	–	–	4	–	1	–
29	(Poland) (24) Jacek Gollob	4	–	–	–	–	–	4
30	(Poland) (27) Jacek Krzyżaniak	3	–	3	–	–	–	–
31	(Germany) (23) Robert Barth	2	–	2	–	–	–	–
32	(United Kingdom) (24) Martin Dugard	2	–	–	–	2	–	–
33	(Poland) (23) Robert Dados	1	–	–	–	–	–	1
Pos.	Rider	Points	CZE (Czech Republic)	GER (Germany)	DEN (Denmark)	GBR (United Kingdom)	SWE (Sweden)	POL (Poland)

== See also ==
- Speedway Grand Prix
- List of Speedway Grand Prix riders
