= 1998 Speedway Grand Prix of Great Britain =

(United Kingdom) 1998 Speedway Grand Prix of Great Britain

Information
- Date: 7 August 1998
- City: (United Kingdom) Coventry
- Event: 4 of 6 (22)
- Referee: (Germany) Wolfgang Glas

Stadium details
- Stadium: Brandon Stadium
- Capacity: 5,000
- Length: 320 m (350 yd)
- Track: speedway track

SGP Results
- Best Time
- (gold) Winner: (Australia) Jason Crump
- (silver) Runner-up: (Sweden) Jimmy Nilsen
- (bronze) 3rd place: (Poland) Tomasz Gollob

The 1998 Speedway Grand Prix of Great Britain was the fourth race of the 1998 Speedway Grand Prix season. It took place on 7 August in the Brandon Stadium in Coventry, England It was the fourth British SGP and first in Coventry. SGP was won by Australian rider Jason Crump. It was the second win of his career, after winning in 1996 London GP.

== Starting positions draw ==
The Speedway Grand Prix Commission nominated Antonín Kasper, Jr. (Czech Republic) and Joe Screen and Martin Dugard (both from Great Britain) as Wild Card.

== Heat details ==
| Placing | Draw | Rider | Total | Pre-Main Event | | | | | | | | | | Main Event | | | | | | | | | | Final Event |
| Placing | Draw | Rider | Total | Round 1 | | | | | | Round 2 | | | | Round 1 | | | | | | Round 2 | | | | 1/2 | | CF | F |
| Placing | Draw | Rider | Total | 1 | 2 | 3 | 4 | 5 | 6 | 7 | 8 | 9 | 10 | 11 | 12 | 13 | 14 | 15 | 16 | 17 | 18 | 19 | 20 | 21 | 22 | 23 | 24 |
|---|---|---|---|---|---|---|---|---|---|---|---|---|---|---|---|---|---|---|---|---|---|---|---|---|---|---|---|
| 1 | 4 | (Australia) (10) Jason Crump | 25 | | | | | | | | | | | | | | 4X | 2 | | | | | 2 | 1 | | | 1 |
| 2 | 8 | (Sweden) (8) Jimmy Nilsen | 20 | | | | | | | | | | | 3 | | | | 1 | | | | 2 | | | 2 | | 2 |
| 3 | 7 | (Poland) (3) Tomasz Gollob | 18 | | | | | | | | | | | | 2 | | | | | 1 | | | | 2 | | | 3 |
| 4 | 16 | (Australia) (9) Ryan Sullivan | 16 | 2 | | | | | | | 1 | | | | 1 | | | | | | 3 | | 1 | | 1 | | 4 |
| 5 | 5 | (United States) (1) Greg Hancock | 15 | | | | | | | | | | | | | | 1 | | | | 1 | | | | 3 | 1 |
| 6 | 22 | (Czech Republic) (22) Antonín Kasper, Jr. | 14 | | | 2 | | | | | 2 | | | 2 | | | | | | | 2 | | | 4 | | 2 |
| 7 | 11 | (United States) (2) Billy Hamill | 12 | | | 1 | | | | 1 | | | | 1 | | | | | | 2 | | | | | 4 | 3 |
| 8 | 10 | (Sweden) (14) Stefan Dannö | 10 | | 1 | | | | | | 4 | 2 | | | | | 2 | | | 3 | | 1 | | 3 | | 4 |
| 9 | 3 | (Sweden) (4) Tony Rickardsson | 8 | | | | | | | | | | | | | 1 | | | | 4 | | | 3 |
| 10 | 9 | (Denmark) (6) Brian Andersen | 8 | 1 | | | | | | 3 | | 1 | | | | 2 | | | | | 4 | 3 |
| 11 | 6 | (United Kingdom) (5) Mark Loram | 7 | | | | | | | | | | | | | 4 | | | 2 | | | 4 |
| 12 | 1 | (Denmark) (7) Hans Nielsen | 7 | | | | | | | | | | | 4 | | | | | 1 | | | | 4X |
| 13 | 2 | (United Kingdom) (18) Chris Louis | 6 | | | | | | | | | | | | 4 | | | 3 |
| 14 | 12 | (Sweden) (19) Henrik Gustafsson | 6 | | | | 1 | | | | 3 | | 1 | | | | 3 | | 3 |
| 15 | 21 | (Denmark) (21) Jesper B. Jensen | 5 | | | | 2 | | | 4 | | | 2 | | | 3 | | 4 |
| 16 | 23 | (United Kingdom) (23) Joe Screen | 5 | | 2 | | | | | 2 | | | | | 3 | | | | 4 |
| Placing | Draw | Rider | Total | 1 | 2 | 3 | 4 | 5 | 6 | 7 | 8 | 9 | 10 | 11 | 12 | 13 | 14 | 15 | 16 | 17 | 18 | 19 | 20 | 21 | 22 | 23 | 24 |
| 17 | 15 | (Australia) (15) Leigh Adams | 4 | | 4T | | | 1 | | | | 3 |
| 18 | 14 | (United Kingdom) (17) Andy Smith | 4 | | | 4 | | | 1 | | | | 3 |
| 19 | 17 | (Italy) (11) Armando Castagna | 3 | 3 | | | | 2 | | | | | 4 |
| 20 | 18 | (Hungary) (12) Zoltan Adorjan | 3 | | 3 | | | | 2 | | | 4 |
| 21 | 13 | (Poland) (13) Piotr Protasiewicz | 2 | | | | 4 | 3 |
| 22 | 24 | (United Kingdom) (24) Martin Dugard | 2 | 4 | | | | | 3R |
| 23 | 20 | (Australia) (16) Craig Boyce | 1 | | | | 3 | | 4X |
| 24 | 19 | (Poland) (20) Sebastian Ułamek | 1 | | | 3 | | 4 |

| Heats 1-10: Pre-Main Event 1-4: First round 5-6: Last chance for second round 7-8: Second round 9-10: Last chance Main Event | Heats 11-20: Main Event 11-14: First round 15-16: Last chance for second round 17-18: Second round 19-20: Last chance for Semi-Finals | Heats 21-24: Final Event 21-22: Semi-Finals 23: Consolation Final 24: The Big Final |

| gate A – inside | gate B | gate C | gate D – outside |

== The intermediate classification ==
Qualifies for next season's Grand Prix series
Full-time Grand Prix rider
Wild card, track reserve or qualified reserve

| Pos. | Rider | Points | CZE (Czech Republic) | GER (Germany) | DEN (Denmark) | GBR (United Kingdom) | SWE (Sweden) | POL (Poland) |
| 1 | (Sweden) (4) Tony Rickardsson | 76 | 25 | 25 | 18 | 8 | | |
| 2 | (Sweden) (8) Jimmy Nilsen | 66 | 18 | 20 | 8 | 20 | | |
| 3 | (Poland) (3) Tomasz Gollob | 58 | 16 | 16 | 8 | 18 | | |
| 4 | (United States) (2) Billy Hamill | 56 | 20 | 18 | 6 | 12 | | |
| 5 | (Denmark) (7) Hans Nielsen | 52 | 8 | 12 | 25 | 7 | | |
| 6 | (United Kingdom) (18) Chris Louis | 49 | 15 | 8 | 20 | 6 | | |
| 7 | (Australia) (10) Jason Crump | 47 | 3 | 3 | 16 | 25 | | |
| 8 | (United States) (1) Greg Hancock | 45 | 6 | 10 | 14 | 15 | | |
| 9 | (Czech Republic) (22) (23) (24) Antonín Kasper, Jr. | 40 | 7 | 4 | 15 | 14 | | |
| 10 | (Australia) (9) Ryan Sullivan | 38 | 12 | 7 | 3 | 16 | | |
| 11 | (Sweden) (14) Stefan Dannö | 37 | 14 | 6 | 7 | 10 | | |
| 12 | (Sweden) (19) Henrik Gustafsson | 35 | 8 | 15 | 6 | 6 | | |
| 13 | (United Kingdom) (5) Mark Loram | 30 | 6 | 7 | 10 | 7 | | |
| 14 | (United Kingdom) (17) Andy Smith | 25 | 2 | 14 | 5 | 4 | | |
| 15 | (Australia) (15) Leigh Adams | 24 | 10 | 6 | 4 | 4 | | |
| 16 | (Denmark) (6) Brian Andersen | 20 | 5 | ns | 7 | 8 | | |
| 17 | (Hungary) (12) Zoltan Adorjan | 17 | 7 | 5 | 2 | 3 | | |
| 18 | (Italy) (11) Armando Castagna | 12 | 1 | 5 | 3 | 3 | | |
| 19 | (Denmark) (22) Brian Karger | 12 | – | – | 12 | – | | |
| 20 | (Poland) (13) Piotr Protasiewicz | 10 | 2 | 1 | 5 | 2 | | |
| 21 | (Denmark) (21) Jesper B. Jensen | 10 | 4 | – | 1 | 5 | | |
| 22 | (Australia) (16) Craig Boyce | 9 | 3 | 4 | 1 | 1 | | |
| 23 | (Sweden) (25) Peter Karlsson | 9 | 1 | 8 | – | – | | |
| 24 | (Germany) (22) (24) Gerd Riss | 6 | 4 | 2 | – | – | | |
| 25 | (Czech Republic) (23) Bohumil Brhel | 5 | 5 | – | – | – | | |
| 26 | (United Kingdom) (23) Joe Screen | 5 | – | – | – | 5 | | |
| 27 | (Poland) (20) Sebastian Ułamek | 4 | – | 1 | 2 | 1 | | |
| 28 | (Norway) (24) Lars Gunnestad | 4 | – | – | 4 | – | | |
| 29 | (Poland) (27) Jacek Krzyżaniak | 3 | – | 3 | – | – | | |
| 30 | (Germany) (23) Robert Barth | 2 | – | 2 | – | – | | |
| 31 | (United Kingdom) (24) Martin Dugard | 2 | – | – | – | 2 | | |
| Pos. | Rider | Points | CZE (Czech Republic) | GER (Germany) | DEN (Denmark) | GBR (United Kingdom) | SWE (Sweden) | POL (Poland) |

== See also ==
- Speedway Grand Prix
- List of Speedway Grand Prix riders
