= 1998 Speedway Grand Prix of Germany =

Information
- Date: 6 June 1998
- City: (Germany) Pocking
- Event: 2 of 6 (20)
- Referee: Frank Ebdon

Stadium details
- Stadium: Rottalstadion
- Track: speedway track

SGP Results
- Best Time
- (gold) Winner: (Sweden) Tony Rickardsson
- (silver) Runner-up: (Sweden) Jimmy Nilsen
- (bronze) 3rd place: (United States) Billy Hamill

The 1998 Speedway Grand Prix of Germany was the second race of the 1998 Speedway Grand Prix season. It took place on June 6 in the Rottalstadion in Pocking, Germany The second Czech Republic SGP, it was won by Swedish rider Tony Rickardsson, his second career win.

== Starting positions draw ==
The Speedway Grand Prix Commission nominated Gerd Riss, Robert Barth (both from Germany) and Antonín Kasper, Jr. (from Czech Republic) as Wild Card.

Draw 14. (Denmark) (6) Brian Andersen → (Poland) (27) Jacek Krzyżaniak
Draw 21. (Denmark) (21) Jesper B. Jensen → (Sweden) (25) Peter Karlsson

== Heat details ==
Placing	Draw	Rider	Total	Pre-Main Event										Main Event										Final Event
Placing	Draw	Rider	Total	Round 1						Round 2				Round 1						Round 2				1/2		CF	F
Placing	Draw	Rider	Total	1	2	3	4	5	6	7	8	9	10	11	12	13	14	15	16	17	18	19	20	21	22	23	24
1	1	(Sweden) (4) Tony Rickardsson	25											1						1				1			1
2	3	(Sweden) (8) Jimmy Nilsen	20													1				4T			2	2			2
3	2	(United States) (2) Billy Hamill	18												2					2					1		3
4	4	(Poland) (3) Tomasz Gollob	16														2			3		2			2		4
5	10	(Sweden) (19) Henrik Gustafsson	15		1						1				1						1				3	1
6	19	(United Kingdom) (17) Andy Smith	14			3		2					2			2					2			3		2
7	9	(Denmark) (7) Hans Nielsen	12	3				1				1				3		1				1		4X		3
8	12	(United States) (1) Greg Hancock	10				2			2					4			2					1		4	4
9	5	(United Kingdom) (18) Chris Louis	8														1				4	3
10	15	(Sweden) (25) Peter Karlsson	8		2					1				2							3		3
11	13	(United Kingdom) (5) Mark Loram	7				3		2			2					3		2			4
12	7	(Australia) (9) Ryan Sullivan	7												3				1				4F
13	6	(Sweden) (14) Stefan Dannö	6													4			3
14	8	(Australia) (15) Leigh Adams	6											3				3
15	20	(Italy) (11) Armando Castagna	5				1				2			4					4X
16	11	(Hungary) (12) Zoltan Adorjan	5			1				4			1				4	4
Placing	Draw	Rider	Total	1	2	3	4	5	6	7	8	9	10	11	12	13	14	15	16	17	18	19	20	21	22	23	24
17	17	(Australia) (16) Craig Boyce	4	1						3		3
18	24	(Czech Republic) (24) Antonín Kasper, Jr.	4	2							3		3
19	16	(Australia) (10) Jason Crump	3	4X					1				4
20	14	(Poland) (27) Jacek Krzyżaniak	3			2					4	4
21	22	(Germany) (22) Gerd Riss	2			4			3
22	23	(Germany) (23) Robert Barth	2		4			3
23	18	(Poland) (13) Piotr Protasiewicz	1		3				4E
24	21	(Poland) (20) Sebastian Ułamek	1				4	4

Heats 1-10: Pre-Main Event 1-4: First round 5-6: Last chance for second round 7-8: Second round 9-10: Last chance Main Event	Heats 11-20: Main Event 11-14: First round 15-16: Last chance for second round 17-18: Second round 19-20: Last chance for Semi-Finals	Heats 21-24: Final Event 21-22: Semi-Finals 23: Consolation Final 24: The Big Final

gate A – inside	gate B	gate C	gate D – outside

== The intermediate classification ==
Qualifies for next season's Grand Prix series
Full-time Grand Prix rider
Wild card, track reserve or qualified reserve

Pos.	Rider	Points	CZE (Czech Republic)	GER (Germany)	DEN (Denmark)	GBR (United Kingdom)	SWE (Sweden)	POL (Poland)
1	(Sweden) (4) Tony Rickardsson	50	25	25				
2	(United States) (2) Billy Hamill	38	20	18				
3	(Sweden) (8) Jimmy Nilsen	38	18	20				
4	(Poland) (3) Tomasz Gollob	32	16	16				
5	(United Kingdom) (18) Chris Louis	23	15	8				
6	(Sweden) (19) Henrik Gustafsson	23	8	15				
7	(Denmark) (7) Hans Nielsen	20	8	12				
8	(Sweden) (14) Stefan Dannö	20	14	6				
9	(Australia) (9) Ryan Sullivan	19	12	7				
10	(United States) (1) Greg Hancock	16	6	10				
11	(Australia) (15) Leigh Adams	16	10	6				
12	(United Kingdom) (17) Andy Smith	16	2	14				
13	(United Kingdom) (5) Mark Loram	13	6	7				
14	(Hungary) (12) Zoltan Adorjan	12	7	5				
15	(Czech Republic) (22) (24) Antonín Kasper, Jr.	11	7	4				
16	(Sweden) (25) Peter Karlsson	9	1	8				
17	(Australia) (16) Craig Boyce	7	3	4				
18	(Australia) (10) Jason Crump	6	3	3				
19	(Italy) (11) Armando Castagna	6	1	5				
20	(Germany) (22) (24) Gerd Riss	6	4	2				
21	(Denmark) (6) Brian Andersen	5	5	–				
22	(Czech Republic) (23) Bohumil Brhel	5	5	–				
23	(Denmark) (21) Jesper B. Jensen	4	4	–				
24	(Poland) (13) Piotr Protasiewicz	3	2	1				
25	(Poland) (27) Jacek Krzyżaniak	3	–	3				
26	(Germany) (23) Robert Barth	2	–	2				
27	(Poland) (20) Sebastian Ułamek	1	–	1				
Pos.	Rider	Points	CZE (Czech Republic)	GER (Germany)	DEN (Denmark)	GBR (United Kingdom)	SWE (Sweden)	POL (Poland)

== See also ==
- Speedway Grand Prix
- List of Speedway Grand Prix riders
