= 1998 Speedway Grand Prix of Czech Republic =

Information
- Date: 15 May 1998
- City: (Czech Republic) Prague
- Event: 1 of 6 (19)
- Referee: (Germany) Wolfgang Glas

Stadium details
- Stadium: Markéta Stadium
- Track: speedway track

SGP Results
- Best Time
- (gold) Winner: (Sweden) Tony Rickardsson
- (silver) Runner-up: (United States) Billy Hamill
- (bronze) 3rd place: (Sweden) Jimmy Nilsen

The 1998 Speedway Grand Prix of Czech Republic was the first race of the 1998 Speedway Grand Prix season. It took place on 15 May in the Markéta Stadium in Prague, Czech Republic It was the second Czech Republic SGP and was won by Swedish rider Tony Rickardsson. It was the first win of his career.

== Starting positions draw ==
The Speedway Grand Prix Commission nominated Antonín Kasper, Jr., Bohumil Brhel (both from Czech Republic) and Gerd Riss (from Germany) as Wild Card.

Draw 20. (Poland) (20) Sebastian Ułamek → (Sweden) (25) Peter Karlsson

== Heat details ==
Placing	Draw	Rider	Total	Pre-Main Event										Main Event										Final Event
Placing	Draw	Rider	Total	Round 1						Round 2				Round 1						Round 2				1/2		CF	F
Placing	Draw	Rider	Total	1	2	3	4	5	6	7	8	9	10	11	12	13	14	15	16	17	18	19	20	21	22	23	24
1	4	(Sweden) (4) Tony Rickardsson	25														2			1				1			1
2	2	(United States) (2) Billy Hamill	20												2					3		1		2			2
3	8	(Sweden) (8) Jimmy Nilsen	18											1						2					1		3
4	3	(Poland) (3) Tomasz Gollob	16													3		1				2			2		4
5	18	(United Kingdom) (18) Chris Louis	15		3				1				1				1				3		1		3	1
6	14	(Sweden) (14) Stefan Dannö	14			1				4			2			2					1				4	2
7	9	(Australia) (9) Ryan Sullivan	12	1						1				2							2			4		3
8	15	(Australia) (15) Leigh Adams	10		1						2			4					1				2	3		4
9	7	(Denmark) (7) Hans Nielsen	8												1						4	3
10	19	(Sweden) (19) Henrik Gustafsson	8			4			2			1				1				4			3
11	12	(Hungary) (12) Zoltan Adorjan	7				2			2					4			2					4
12	22	(Czech Republic) (22) Antonín Kasper, Jr.	7			2					1				3				2			4
13	1	(United States) (1) Greg Hancock	6											3				3
14	5	(United Kingdom) (5) Mark Loram	6														3		3
15	6	(Denmark) (6) Brian Andersen	5													4			4
16	23	(Czech Republic) (23) Bohumil Brhel	5		2					3		2					4	4
Placing	Draw	Rider	Total	1	2	3	4	5	6	7	8	9	10	11	12	13	14	15	16	17	18	19	20	21	22	23	24
17	21	(Denmark) (21) Jesper B. Jensen	4				1				4	3
18	24	(Germany) (24) Gerd Riss	4	3				2					3
19	10	(Australia) (10) Jason Crump	3		4E			1				4
20	16	(Australia) (16) Craig Boyce	3	2							3		4
21	13	(Poland) (13) Piotr Protasiewicz	2				4	3
22	17	(United Kingdom) (17) Andy Smith	2	4E					3
23	11	(Italy) (11) Armando Castagna	1			3		4F
24	20	(Sweden) (25) Peter Karlsson	1				3		4

Heats 1-10: Pre-Main Event 1-4: First round 5-6: Last chance for second round 7-8: Second round 9-10: Last chance Main Event	Heats 11-20: Main Event 11-14: First round 15-16: Last chance for second round 17-18: Second round 19-20: Last chance for Semi-Finals	Heats 21-24: Final Event 21-22: Semi-Finals 23: Consolation Final 24: The Big Final

gate A – inside	gate B	gate C	gate D – outside

== The intermediate classification ==
Qualifies for next season's Grand Prix series
Full-time Grand Prix rider
Wild card, track reserve or qualified reserve

Pos.	Rider	Points	CZE (Czech Republic)	GER (Germany)	DEN (Denmark)	GBR (United Kingdom)	SWE (Sweden)	POL (Poland)
1	(Sweden) (4) Tony Rickardsson	25	25					
2	(United States) (2) Billy Hamill	20	20					
3	(Sweden) (8) Jimmy Nilsen	18	18					
4	(Poland) (3) Tomasz Gollob	16	16					
5	(United Kingdom) (18) Chris Louis	15	15					
6	(Sweden) (14) Stefan Dannö	14	14					
7	(Australia) (9) Ryan Sullivan	12	12					
8	(Australia) (15) Leigh Adams	10	10					
9	(Denmark) (7) Hans Nielsen	8	8					
10	(Sweden) (19) Henrik Gustafsson	8	8					
11	(Hungary) (12) Zoltan Adorjan	7	7					
12	(Czech Republic) (22) Antonín Kasper, Jr.	7	7					
13	(United States) (1) Greg Hancock	6	6					
14	(United Kingdom) (5) Mark Loram	6	6					
15	(Denmark) (6) Brian Andersen	5	5					
16	(Czech Republic) (23) Bohumil Brhel	5	5					
17	(Denmark) (21) Jesper B. Jensen	4	4					
18	(Germany) (24) Gerd Riss	4	4					
19	(Australia) (10) Jason Crump	3	3					
20	(Australia) (16) Craig Boyce	3	3					
21	(Poland) (13) Piotr Protasiewicz	2	2					
22	(United Kingdom) (17) Andy Smith	2	2					
23	(Italy) (11) Armando Castagna	1	1					
24	(Sweden) (25) Peter Karlsson	1	1					
Rider(s) not classified
	(Poland) (20) Sebastian Ułamek	—	–					
Pos.	Rider	Points	CZE (Czech Republic)	GER (Germany)	DEN (Denmark)	GBR (United Kingdom)	SWE (Sweden)	POL (Poland)

== See also ==
- Speedway Grand Prix
- List of Speedway Grand Prix riders
