= 1998 Speedway Grand Prix of Sweden =

Information
- Date: 28 August 1998
- City: (Sweden) Linköping
- Event: 5 of 6 (23)
- Referee: (Germany) Wolfgang Glas

Stadium details
- Stadium: Motorstadium
- Track: speedway track

SGP Results
- Best Time
- (gold) Winner: (Sweden) Tony Rickardsson
- (silver) Runner-up: (United Kingdom) Chris Louis
- (bronze) 3rd place: (Sweden) Peter Karlsson

The 1998 Speedway Grand Prix of Sweden was the fifth race of the 1998 Speedway Grand Prix season. It took place on 28 August in the Motorstadium in Linköping, Sweden It was fourth Swedish SGP and was won by World Champion Tony Rickardsson. It was third win of his career.

== Starting positions draw ==
The Speedway Grand Prix Commission nominated Antonín Kasper, Jr. (Czech Republic), Peter Karlsson (Sweden) and Lars Gunnestad (Norway) as Wild Card.

== Heat details ==
Placing	Draw	Rider	Total	Pre-Main Event										Main Event										Final Event
Placing	Draw	Rider	Total	Round 1						Round 2				Round 1						Round 2				1/2		CF	F
Placing	Draw	Rider	Total	1	2	3	4	5	6	7	8	9	10	11	12	13	14	15	16	17	18	19	20	21	22	23	24
1	8	(Sweden) (4) Tony Rickardsson	25											1						1				1			1
2	12	(United Kingdom) (18) Chris Louis	20				1				3		1				4T	2					2	2			2
3	23	(Sweden) (23) Peter Karlsson	18		3				2			2					2			2					2		3
4	5	(United States) (1) Greg Hancock	16														3		2			2			1		4
5	2	(Sweden) (8) Jimmy Nilsen	15												1						3		1		3	1
6	3	(Poland) (3) Tomasz Gollob	14													2					1				4R	2
7	15	(Australia) (15) Leigh Adams	12		1						2			2							4	1		3		3
8	4	(Australia) (9) Ryan Sullivan	10														1				2			4		4
9	10	(United Kingdom) (5) Mark Loram	8		2					1				3				1				3
10	11	(Denmark) (7) Hans Nielsen	8			2					1				2					4			3
11	9	(Denmark) (6) Brian Andersen	7	2							4	1				1				3		4
12	1	(Australia) (10) Jason Crump	7											4					1				4
13	17	(Italy) (11) Armando Castagna	6	1						2					3				3
14	16	(United Kingdom) (17) Andy Smith	6	3				2					2			3		3
15	6	(United States) (2) Billy Hamill	5													4			4
16	7	(Sweden) (14) Stefan Dannö	5												4			4
Placing	Draw	Rider	Total	1	2	3	4	5	6	7	8	9	10	11	12	13	14	15	16	17	18	19	20	21	22	23	24
17	20	(Australia) (16) Craig Boyce	4				4	1				3
18	21	(Poland) (20) Sebastian Ułamek	4				2			4			3
19	19	(Poland) (13) Piotr Protasiewicz	3			1				3		4
20	22	(Czech Republic) (22) Antonín Kasper, Jr.	3			4R			1				4
21	13	(Sweden) (19) Henrik Gustafsson	2				3		3
22	14	(Denmark) (21) Jesper B. Jensen	2			3		3
23	18	(Hungary) (12) Zoltan Adorjan	1		4			4
24	24	(Norway) (24) Lars Gunnestad	1	4					4T

Heats 1-10: Pre-Main Event 1-4: First round 5-6: Last chance for second round 7-8: Second round 9-10: Last chance Main Event	Heats 11-20: Main Event 11-14: First round 15-16: Last chance for second round 17-18: Second round 19-20: Last chance for Semi-Finals	Heats 21-24: Final Event 21-22: Semi-Finals 23: Consolation Final 24: The Big Final

gate A – inside	gate B	gate C	gate D – outside

== The intermediate classification ==
Qualifies for next season's Grand Prix series
Full-time Grand Prix rider
Wild card, track reserve or qualified reserve

Pos.	Rider	Points	CZE (Czech Republic)	GER (Germany)	DEN (Denmark)	GBR (United Kingdom)	SWE (Sweden)	POL (Poland)
1	(Sweden) (4) Tony Rickardsson	101	25	25	18	8	25	
2	(Sweden) (8) Jimmy Nilsen	81	18	20	8	20	15	
3	(Poland) (3) Tomasz Gollob	72	16	16	8	18	14	
4	(United Kingdom) (18) Chris Louis	69	15	8	20	6	20	
5	(United States) (1) Greg Hancock	61	6	10	14	15	16	
6	(United States) (2) Billy Hamill	61	20	18	6	12	5	
7	(Denmark) (7) Hans Nielsen	60	8	12	25	7	8	
8	(Australia) (10) Jason Crump	54	3	3	16	25	7	
9	(Australia) (9) Ryan Sullivan	48	12	7	3	16	10	
10	(Czech Republic) (22) (23) (24) Antonín Kasper, Jr.	43	7	4	15	14	3	
11	(Sweden) (14) Stefan Dannö	42	14	6	7	10	5	
12	(United Kingdom) (5) Mark Loram	38	6	7	10	7	8	
13	(Sweden) (19) Henrik Gustafsson	37	8	15	6	6	2	
14	(Australia) (15) Leigh Adams	36	10	6	4	4	12	
15	(United Kingdom) (17) Andy Smith	31	2	14	5	4	6	
16	(Denmark) (6) Brian Andersen	27	5	–	7	8	7	
17	(Sweden) (25) Peter Karlsson	27	1	8	–	–	18	
18	(Italy) (11) Armando Castagna	18	1	5	3	3	6	
19	(Hungary) (12) Zoltan Adorjan	18	7	5	2	3	1	
20	(Poland) (13) Piotr Protasiewicz	13	2	1	5	2	3	
21	(Australia) (16) Craig Boyce	13	3	4	1	1	4	
22	(Denmark) (21) Jesper B. Jensen	12	4	–	1	5	2	
23	(Denmark) (22) Brian Karger	12	–	–	12	–	–	
24	(Poland) (20) Sebastian Ułamek	8	–	1	2	1	4	
25	(Germany) (22) (24) Gerd Riss	6	4	2	–	–	–	
26	(Czech Republic) (23) Bohumil Brhel	5	5	–	–	–	–	
26	(United Kingdom) (23) Joe Screen	5	–	–	–	5	–	
28	(Norway) (24) Lars Gunnestad	5	–	–	4	–	1	
29	(Poland) (27) Jacek Krzyżaniak	3	–	3	–	–	–	
30	(Germany) (23) Robert Barth	2	–	2	–	–	–	
31	(United Kingdom) (24) Martin Dugard	2	–	–	–	2	–	
Pos.	Rider	Points	CZE (Czech Republic)	GER (Germany)	DEN (Denmark)	GBR (United Kingdom)	SWE (Sweden)	POL (Poland)

== See also ==
- Speedway Grand Prix
- List of Speedway Grand Prix riders
