= 1998 Speedway Grand Prix of Denmark =

Information
- Date: 17 July 1998
- City: (Denmark) Vojens
- Event: 3 of 6 (21)
- Referee: (Sweden) Christer Bergstrom

Stadium details
- Stadium: Speedway Center
- Track: speedway track

SGP Results
- Best Time
- (gold) Winner: (Denmark) Hans Nielsen
- (silver) Runner-up: (United Kingdom) Chris Louis
- (bronze) 3rd place: (Sweden) Tony Rickardsson

The 1998 Speedway Grand Prix of Denmark was the third race of the 1998 Speedway Grand Prix season. It took place on 17 July in the Speedway Center in Vojens, Denmark It was the fourth Danish SGP and was won by Danish rider Hans Nielsen. It was the fifth win of his career.

== Starting positions draw ==
The Speedway Grand Prix Commission nominated Brian Karger (from Denmark), Antonín Kasper, Jr. (Czech Republic) and Lars Gunnestad (Norway) as Wild Card.

== Heat details ==
Placing	Draw	Rider	Total	Pre-Main Event										Main Event										Final Event
Placing	Draw	Rider	Total	Round 1						Round 2				Round 1						Round 2				1/2		CF	F
Placing	Draw	Rider	Total	1	2	3	4	5	6	7	8	9	10	11	12	13	14	15	16	17	18	19	20	21	22	23	24
1	7	(Denmark) (7) Hans Nielsen	25												2					1				2			1
2	9	(United Kingdom) (18) Chris Louis	20	1						1				4					1				2	1			2
3	1	(Sweden) (4) Tony Rickardsson	18											2							1				1		3
4	17	(Australia) (10) Jason Crump	16	2							2			3				1				2			2		4
5	23	(Czech Republic) (23) Antonín Kasper, Jr.	15		2					4			2			1				3		1		3		1
6	8	(United States) (1) Greg Hancock	14											1						2					3	2
7	22	(Denmark) (22) Brian Karger	12			1				2					4			2
8	10	(United Kingdom) (5) Mark Loram	10		3				2			1				2
9	4	(Poland) (3) Tomasz Gollob	8														2			4			3
10	2	(Sweden) (8) Jimmy Nilsen	8												3				2			3
11	18	(Denmark) (6) Brian Andersen	7		1						3		1				1				4R	4
12	12	(Sweden) (14) Stefan Dannö	7				1				1				1						3		4
13	3	(United States) (2) Billy Hamill	6													3		3
14	5	(Sweden) (19) Henrik Gustafsson	6														3		3
15	20	(Poland) (13) Piotr Protasiewicz	5				4F	1				2					4X	4
16	6	(United Kingdom) (17) Andy Smith	5													4			4
Placing	Draw	Rider	Total	1	2	3	4	5	6	7	8	9	10	11	12	13	14	15	16	17	18	19	20	21	22	23	24
17	13	(Australia) (15) Leigh Adams	4				2			3		3
18	24	(Norway) (24) Lars Gunnestad	4	4					1				3
19	11	(Australia) (9) Ryan Sullivan	3			2					4	4
20	14	(Italy) (11) Armando Castagna	3			3		2					4
21	15	(Hungary) (12) Zoltan Adorjan	2		4			3
22	21	(Poland) (20) Sebastian Ułamek	2				3		3
23	16	(Australia) (16) Craig Boyce	1	3				4
24	19	(Denmark) (21) Jesper B. Jensen	1			4			4

Heats 1-10: Pre-Main Event 1-4: First round 5-6: Last chance for second round 7-8: Second round 9-10: Last chance Main Event	Heats 11-20: Main Event 11-14: First round 15-16: Last chance for second round 17-18: Second round 19-20: Last chance for Semi-Finals	Heats 21-24: Final Event 21-22: Semi-Finals 23: Consolation Final 24: The Big Final

gate A – inside	gate B	gate C	gate D – outside

== The intermediate classification ==
Qualifies for next season's Grand Prix series
Full-time Grand Prix rider
Wild card, track reserve or qualified reserve

Pos.	Rider	Points	CZE (Czech Republic)	GER (Germany)	DEN (Denmark)	GBR (United Kingdom)	SWE (Sweden)	POL (Poland)
1	(Sweden) (4) Tony Rickardsson	68	25	25	18			
2	(Sweden) (8) Jimmy Nilsen	46	18	20	8			
3	(Denmark) (7) Hans Nielsen	45	8	12	25			
4	(United States) (2) Billy Hamill	44	20	18	6			
5	(United Kingdom) (18) Chris Louis	43	15	8	20			
6	(Poland) (3) Tomasz Gollob	40	16	16	8			
7	(United States) (1) Greg Hancock	30	6	10	14			
8	(Sweden) (19) Henrik Gustafsson	29	8	15	6			
9	(Sweden) (14) Stefan Dannö	27	14	6	7			
10	(Czech Republic) (22) (23) (24) Antonín Kasper, Jr.	26	7	4	15			
11	(United Kingdom) (5) Mark Loram	23	6	7	10			
12	(Australia) (9) Ryan Sullivan	22	12	7	3			
13	(Australia) (10) Jason Crump	22	3	3	16			
14	(United Kingdom) (17) Andy Smith	21	2	14	5			
15	(Australia) (15) Leigh Adams	20	10	6	4			
16	(Hungary) (12) Zoltan Adorjan	14	7	5	2			
17	(Denmark) (6) Brian Andersen	12	5	–	7			
18	(Denmark) (22) Brian Karger	12	–	–	12			
19	(Italy) (11) Armando Castagna	9	1	5	3			
20	(Sweden) (25) Peter Karlsson	9	1	8	–			
21	(Poland) (13) Piotr Protasiewicz	8	2	1	5			
22	(Australia) (16) Craig Boyce	8	3	4	1			
23	(Germany) (22) (24) Gerd Riss	6	4	2	–			
24	(Denmark) (21) Jesper B. Jensen	5	4	–	1			
25	(Czech Republic) (23) Bohumil Brhel	5	5	–	–			
26	(Norway) (24) Lars Gunnestad	4	–	–	4			
27	(Poland) (20) Sebastian Ułamek	3	–	1	2			
28	(Poland) (27) Jacek Krzyżaniak	3	–	3	–			
29	(Germany) (23) Robert Barth	2	–	2	–			
Pos.	Rider	Points	CZE (Czech Republic)	GER (Germany)	DEN (Denmark)	GBR (United Kingdom)	SWE (Sweden)	POL (Poland)

== See also ==
- Speedway Grand Prix
- List of Speedway Grand Prix riders
