= 1992 Swedish speedway season =

Motorcycle racing competition

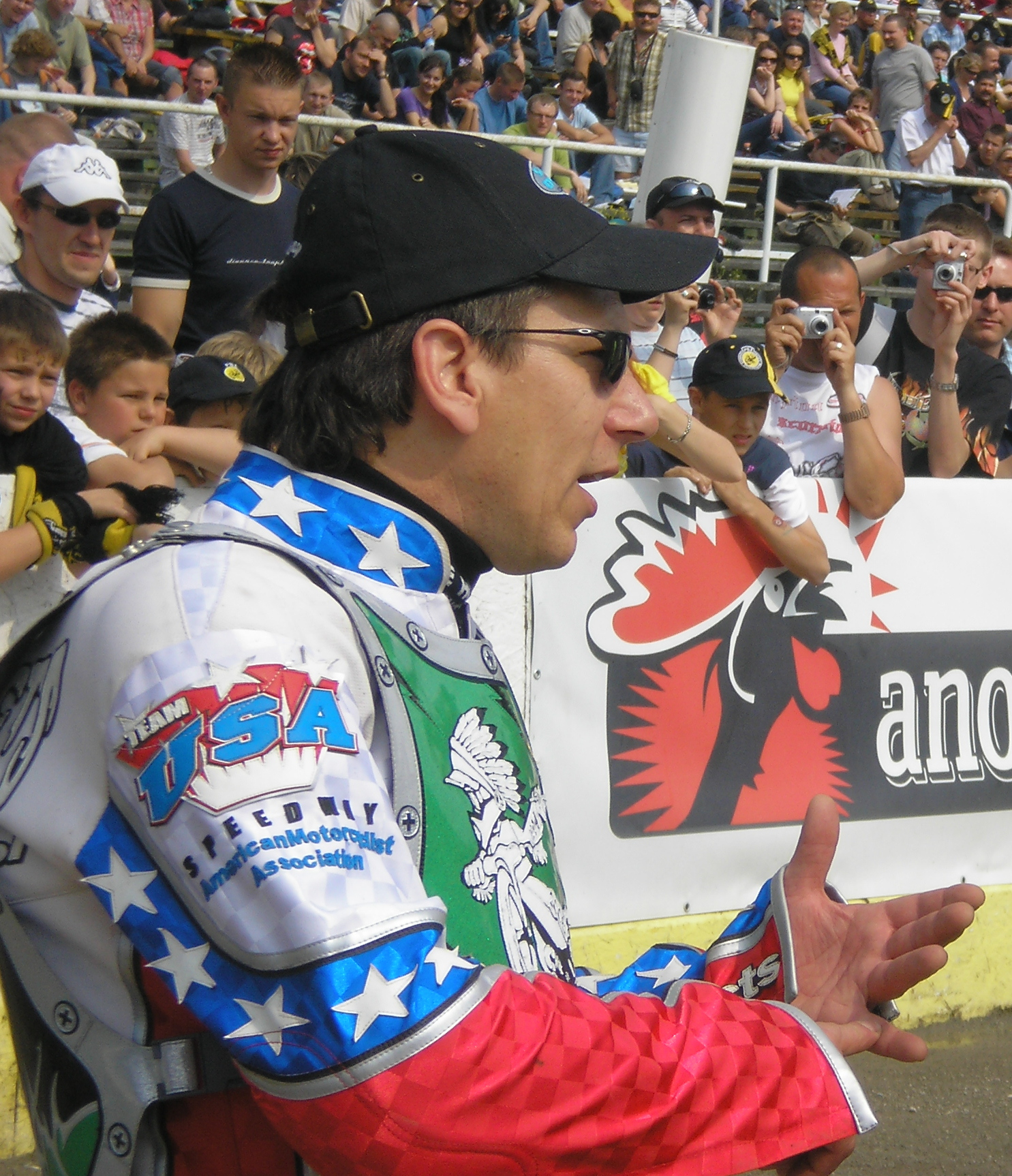
- 1992 was the year of the Americans; Sam Ermolenko (pictured) of Skepparna, topped the league averages and John Cook became the Swedish champion.

The 1992 Swedish speedway season was the 1992 season of motorcycle speedway in Sweden.

== Individual ==
=== Individual Championship ===
The 1992 Swedish Individual Speedway Championship final was held in Mariestad on 6 September. John Cook won the Swedish Championship.

Cook became the first and only rider in the history of the event to win the title as a non-Swedish rider. He qualified for the competition due to his residence being in Sweden.

Pos	Rider	Team	Pts	Total
1	John Cook	Indianerna	(3,3,3,3,3)	15
2	Per Jonsson	Getingarna	(3,2,2,2,3)	12+3
3	Claes Ivarsson	Vetlanda	(2,3,3,1,3)	12+2
4	Peter Karlsson	Örnarna	(2,1,3,3,2)	11
5	Mikael Karlsson	Örnarna	(1,3,2,2,1)	10
6	Tony Rickardsson	Rospiggarna	(2,2,2,1,2)	9
7	Peter Nahlin	Smederna	(3,3,1,0,1)	8
8	Henrik Gustafsson	Indianerna	(2,2,0,0,3)	7
9	Dennis Löfqvist	Bysarna	(1,1,0,3,2)	7
10	Niklas Karlsson	Örnarna	(0,d,1,3,2)	6
11	Conny Ivarsson	Vetlanda	(1,1,2,2,0)	6
12	Jimmy Nilsen	Getingarna	(3,1,1,0,0)	5
13	Tony Olsson	Bysarna	(w,2,0,2,0)	4
14	Kenneth Lindby	Bysarna	(0,0,2,1,1)	4
15	Jimmy Engman	Getingarna	(0,0,1,0,1)	2
16	Niklas Klingberg	Örnarna	(1,0,0,1,0)	2

=== U21 Championship ===
Mikael Karlsson won the U21 championship.

== Team ==
=== Team Championship ===
Örnarna won the Elitserien and were declared the winners of the Swedish Speedway Team Championship for the first time in their history. The Örnarna team included Kelvin Tatum, Peter Karlsson, Christer Rohlén, Mikael Karlsson and Rick Miller.

Many of the teams created a reserve side to compete in the lower divisions, they were - Stockholm (Getingarna), Husarerna (Indianerna), Stjärnorna (Rospiggarna), Gesällerna (Smederna), Zaags (Dackarna), Njudungarna (Vetlanda), Peking Riders (Vargarna) and Mariestad (Örnarna).

Smederna won the first division, while Stockholm and Zaags won the second division east and west respectively.

Elitserien
Pos	Team	Pts
1	Örnarna	24
2	Indianerna	22
3	Bysarna	18
4	Skepparna	15
5	Rospiggarna	13
6	Vetlanda	9
7	Getingarna	8
8	Dackarna	3

Div 1
Pos	Team	Pts
1	Smederna	26
2	Valsarna	23
3	Vargarna	16
4	Kaparna	12
5	Griparna	12
6	Masarna	12
7	Filbyterna	6
8	Karlstad	5

Div 2 east
Pos	Team	Pts
1	Stockholm	26
2	Husarerna	23
3	Stjärnorna	18
4	Piraterna	18
5	Gesällerna	16
6	Eskilstuna	13
7	Buddys	12

Div 2 west
Pos	Team	Pts
1	Zaags	25
2	Korparna	23
3	Njudungarna	20
4	Nässjö	20
5	Peking Riders	14
6	Mariestad	12
7	Gnistorna	10

== See also ==
- Speedway in Sweden
