= 1996 Swedish speedway season =

Motorcycle racing competition

The 1996 Swedish speedway season was the 1996 season of motorcycle speedway in Sweden.

== Individual ==
=== Individual Championship ===
The 1996 Swedish Individual Speedway Championship final was held at the Orionparken in Hallstavik on 24 August. Jimmy Nilsen won the Swedish Championship.

Pos	Rider	Team	Pts	Total
1	Jimmy Nilsen	Rospiggarna	(3,3,3,3,3)	15
2	Tony Rickardsson	Valsarna	(3,3,3,3,2)	14
3	Henrik Gustafsson	Indianerna	(3,3,3,3,u)	12
4	Daniel Andersson	Indianerna	(2,2,1,3,3)	11
5	Tony Olsson	Bysarna	(3,2,1,2,2)	10
6	Stefan Andersson	Indianerna	(0.3.2.0.3)	8
7	Peter Karlsson	Örnarna	(2,1,2,2,1)	8
8	Niklas Klingberg	Örnarna	(2,2,d,1,2)	7
9	Emil Lindqvist	Rospiggarna	(2,0,2,2,1)	7
10	Mikael Teurnberg	Rospiggarna	(1,1,3,1,1)	7
11	Erik Stenlund	Rospiggarna	(d,2,1,2,0)	5
12	Conny Ivarsson	Vetlanda	(1,0,0,1,3)	5
13	Einar Kyllingstad	Rospiggarna	(1,0,1,1,1)	4
14	Mikael Karlsson	Örnarna	(d,1,0,0,2)	3
15	Claes Ivarsson	Vetlanda	(0,1,2,0,d)	3
16	Stefan Dannö	Valsarna	(1,0,0,0,0)	1

=== U21 Championship ===
Emil Lindqvist won the U21 championship.

== Team ==
=== Team Championship ===
Örnarna won the Elitserien and were declared the winners of the Swedish Speedway Team Championship for the fourth time. The Örnarna team included Peter Karlsson, Kelvin Tatum, Mikael Karlsson and Niklas Klingberg.

Leading positions in Division 1 North & South groups determined Division 1A & 1B leagues. Vargarna and Getingarna won the first division leagues respectively.

Elitserien
Pos	Team	Pts
1	Örnarna	28
2	Rospiggarna	27
3	Indianerna	23
4	Valsarna	16
5	Vetlanda	15
6	Smederna	12
7	Västervik	11
8	Bysarna	8
9	Dackarna	4

Div 1A
Pos	Team	Pts
1	Vargarna	8
2	Kaparna	6
3	Karlstad	6
4	Masarna	4

Div 1B
Pos	Team	Pts
1	Getingarna	8
2	Eskilstuna	8
3	Nässjö	7
4	Piraterna	5
5	Korparna	5
6	Filbyterna	5
7	Team Viking	4

== See also ==
- Speedway in Sweden
