= Christer Rohlén =

Swedish speedway rider

- Born: 7 April 1967 (age 59); Örebro, Sweden
- Nationality: Swedish

Career history

Sweden
- 1983–1991: Indianerna
- 1992–2000: Örnarna
- 2002: Vikingarna

Great Britain
- 1994–1995: Arena Essex Hammers

Poland
- 1990, 1994: KS Toruń

Team honours
- 1990, 1991, 1992 1993, 1994, 1996: Elitserien champion
- 1990: Polish League Champion
- 2002: Division One (East) Winner

Christer Karlsson Rohlén (born 7 April 1967) is a former motorcycle speedway rider from Sweden. He earned two caps for the Sweden national speedway team.

== Career ==
Rohlén started his career riding for Indianerna in 1983. He would spend nine seasons with the club and reached the final of the 1988 Junior World Championship. He won his first of six Swedish Speedway Team Championships with Indianerna in 1990.

In 1992, Rohlén joined Örnarna from Indianerna and would go on to win four more Elitserien titles in 1992, 1993, 1994 and 1996.

In 1994, Rohlén made his British leagues debut with Arena Essex Hammers for the 1994 British League season. He also completed the 1995 Premier League speedway season with the club.
