= 1978 Individual Speedway Junior European Championship =

European motorcycle speedway event

European Under-21 Championship
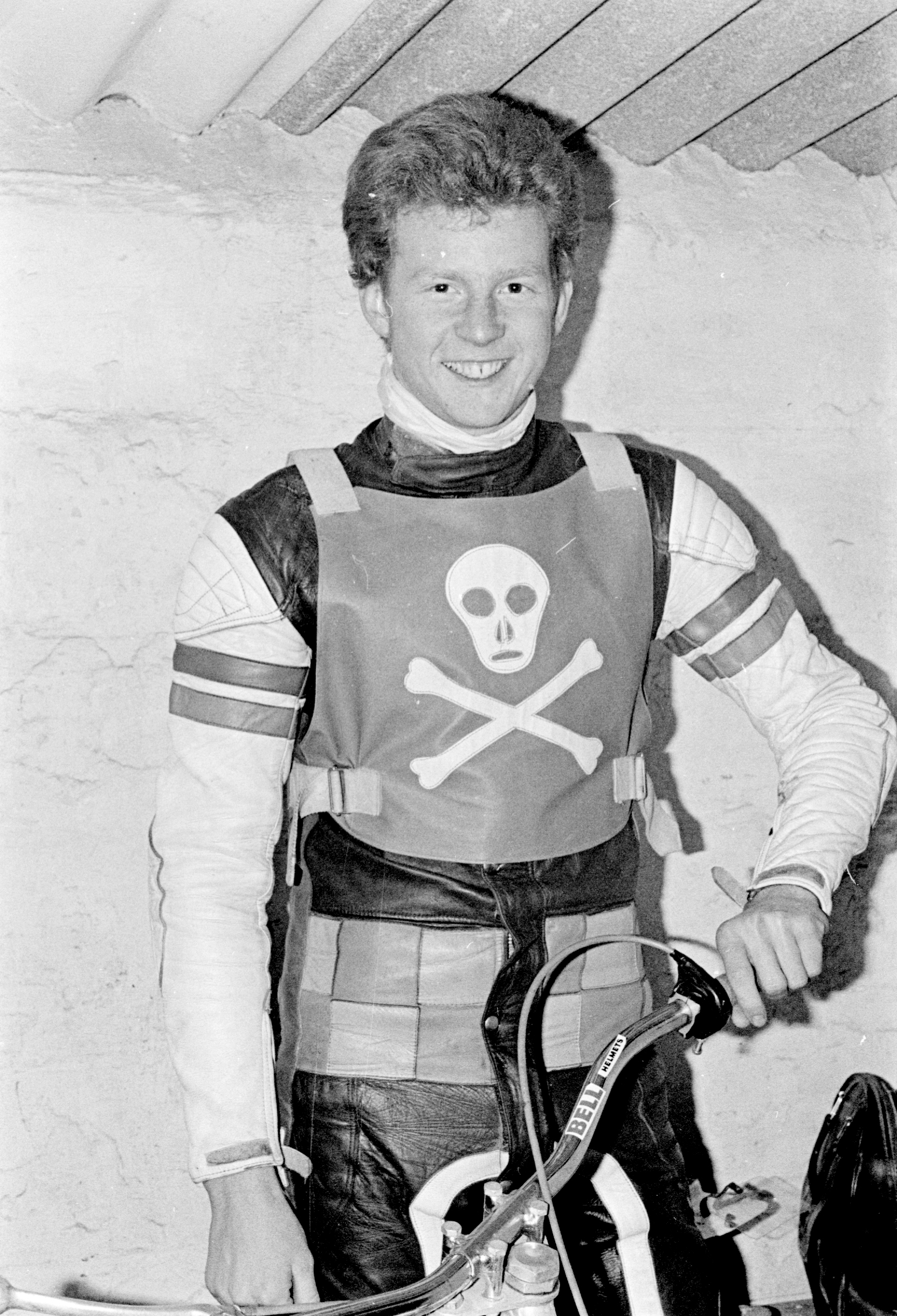
- Neil Middleditch took the bronze medal
- Venue: Santa Marina Stadium
- Location: Lonigo, Italy
- Start date: 22 July 1978

The 1978 Individual Speedway Junior European Championship was the second edition of the European Under-21 Championships.

The Championship was won by Finn Jensen.

== European Final ==
- 22 July 1978
- (Italy) Santa Marina Stadium, Lonigo

Placing	Rider	Total	1	2	3	4	5	6	7	8	9	10	11	12	13	14	15	16	17	18	19	20	Pts	Pos	21
1	(Denmark) (12) Finn Rune Jensen	13			3					3		3			3						1		13	1	
2	(England) (13) Kevin Jolly	12				3	2							1		3					3		12	2	3
3	(England) (16) Neil Middleditch	12				2				2	2						3			3			12	3	2
4	(England) (15) Steve Finch	12				1			3			2						3	3				12	4	1
5	(Denmark) (5) Hans Nielsen	11		3			3					F					2					3	11	5	
6	(Denmark) (6) Erik Gundersen	11		2				2			3							2			2		11	6	
7	(Czechoslovakia) (8) Joszef Juza	8		1						0			3			2			2				8	7	
8	(Czechoslovakia) (4) Pavel Karnas	8	3							1				3				1				0	8	8	
9	(Poland) (2) Ryszard Romaniak	6	2					1				1				0				2			6	9	
10	(Poland) (10) Henryk Olszak	5			1			3						0			1		0				5	10	
11	(Italy) (7) Fausto Birbini	5		0					0					2	2					1			5	11	
12	(Sweden) (11) Lillebror Johansson	5			0				2		1					1						1	5	12	
13	(Bulgaria) (14) Nikolai Manev	4				X		0					2		F							2	4	13	
14	(Poland) (9) Mieczysław Kmieciak	4			2		1						1					0		0			4	14	
15	(Italy) (1) Armando Gigliali	2	F				0				0				1				1				2	15	
16	(Poland) (3) Roman Jankowski	2	1						1				0				0				0		2	16	
R1	(Czechoslovakia) (R1) Ladislav Gradecky	0																					0	R1	
R2	(Australia) (R2) Danny Kennedy	0																					0	R2	
Placing	Rider	Total	1	2	3	4	5	6	7	8	9	10	11	12	13	14	15	16	17	18	19	20	Pts	Pos	21

m - exclusion for exceeding two minute time allowance • t - exclusion for touching the tapes • x - other exclusion • e - retired or mechanical failure • f - fell • ns - non-starter • nc - non-classify

gate A - inside	gate B	gate C	gate D - outside
