= 1998 Speedway Grand Prix =

4th season of the Speedway Grand Prix

Season details
- Dates: May 15 - September 18
- Events: 6
- Cities: 6
- Countries: 6
- Riders: 21 permanents 3 wild card(s)
- Heats: 144 (in 6 events)

Winners
- Champion: SWE Tony Rickardsson
- Runner-up: SWE Jimmy Nilsen
- 3rd place: POL Tomasz Gollob

The 1998 Speedway Grand Prix was the 53rd edition of the official World Championship. It was the fourth season in the Speedway Grand Prix era used to determine the Speedway World Champion.

Tony Rickardsson won the World title, which included three wins from the six Grand Prix events. The Swede's win was his second World title success and he secured the gold medal comfortably ahead of nearest rivals Jimmy Nilsen and Tomasz Gollob.

== Event format ==
The system used was a new one for the 4th SGP season with 24 riders, divided into two classes. The eight best would be directly qualified for the "Main Event", while the sixteen others would be knocked out if they finished out of the top two in 4-man heats on two occasions - while they would go through if they finished inside the top two on two occasions. This resulted in 10 heats, where eight proceeded to the Main Event, where exactly the same system was applied to give eight riders to a semi-final.

The semi-finals were then two heats of four, where the top two qualified for a final and the last two going towards the consolation final. The 4 finalists scored 25, 20, 18 and 16 points, with 5th to 8th scoring 15, 14, 12 and 10 point, and after that 8, 8, 7, 7, etc. Places after 8th place were awarded according to the time a rider was knocked out and, secondly, according to position in the last heat he rode in.

== Qualification for Grand Prix ==
The 1998 season had 21 permanent riders and 3 wild card at each event. The permanent riders are highlighted in the results table below.

== Calendar ==
Round	Date	City and venue	Winner	Runner-up	3rd placed	4th placed	Results
1	May 15	(Czech Republic) Prague , Czech Republic; Markéta Stadium	(Sweden) Tony Rickardsson	(United States) Billy Hamill	(Sweden) Jimmy Nilsen	(Poland) Tomasz Gollob	results
2	June 6	(Germany) Pocking , Germany; Rottalstadion	(Sweden) Tony Rickardsson	(Sweden) Jimmy Nilsen	(United States) Billy Hamill	(Poland) Tomasz Gollob	results
3	June 19	(Denmark) Vojens , Denmark; Speedway Center	(Denmark) Hans Nielsen	(United Kingdom) Chris Louis	(Sweden) Tony Rickardsson	(Australia) Jason Crump	results
4	August 7	(United Kingdom) Coventry , Great Britain; Brandon Stadium	(Australia) Jason Crump	(Sweden) Jimmy Nilsen	(Poland) Tomasz Gollob	(Australia) Ryan Sullivan	results
5	August 28	(Sweden) Linköping , Sweden; Motorstadium	(Sweden) Tony Rickardsson	(United Kingdom) Chris Louis	(Sweden) Peter Karlsson	(United States) Greg Hancock	results
6	September 18	(Poland) Bydgoszcz , Poland; Polonia Stadium	(Poland) Tomasz Gollob	(Australia) Ryan Sullivan	(Sweden) Jimmy Nilsen	(Denmark) Hans Nielsen	results

== Final standings ==
Qualifies for next season's Grand Prix series
Full-time Grand Prix rider
Wild card, track reserve or qualified reserve

Pos.	Rider	Points	CZE (Czech Republic)	GER (Germany)	DEN (Denmark)	GBR (United Kingdom)	SWE (Sweden)	POL (Poland)
Gold	(Sweden) (4) Tony Rickardsson	111	25	25	18	8	25	10
Silver	(Sweden) (8) Jimmy Nilsen	99	18	20	8	20	15	18
Bronze	(Poland) (3) Tomasz Gollob	97	16	16	8	18	14	25
4	(Denmark) (7) Hans Nielsen	76	8	12	25	7	8	16
5	(United Kingdom) (18) Chris Louis	75	15	8	20	6	20	6
6	(United States) (1) Greg Hancock	69	6	10	14	15	16	8
7	(Australia) (9) Ryan Sullivan	68	12	7	3	16	10	20
8	(Australia) (10) Jason Crump	62 (+3)	3	3	16	25	7	8
9	(United States) (2) Billy Hamill	62 (+N)	20	18	6	12	5	1
10	(United Kingdom) (5) Mark Loram	52	6	7	10	7	8	14
11	(Australia) (15) Leigh Adams	51	10	6	4	4	12	15
12	(Czech Republic) (22) (23) (24) Antonín Kasper, Jr.	50	7	4	15	14	3	7
13	(Sweden) (14) Stefan Dannö	49	14	6	7	10	5	7
14	(United Kingdom) (17) Andy Smith	43	2	14	5	4	6	12
15	(Sweden) (19) Henrik Gustafsson	43	8	15	6	6	2	6
16	(Denmark) (6) Brian Andersen	31	5	–	7	8	7	4
17	(Sweden) (23) (25) Peter Karlsson	27	1	8	–	–	18	–
18	(Italy) (11) Armando Castagna	23	1	5	3	3	6	5
19	(Hungary) (12) Zoltan Adorjan	21	7	5	2	3	1	3
20	(Australia) (16) Craig Boyce	18	3	4	1	1	4	5
21	(Poland) (13) Piotr Protasiewicz	16	2	1	5	2	3	3
22	(Denmark) (21) Jesper B. Jensen	14	4	–	1	5	2	2
23	(Denmark) (22) Brian Karger	12	–	–	12	–	–	–
24	(Poland) (20) Sebastian Ułamek	10	–	1	2	1	4	2
25	(Germany) (22) (24) Gerd Riss	6	4	2	–	–	–	–
26	(Czech Republic) (23) Bohumil Brhel	5	5	–	–	–	–	–
26	(United Kingdom) (23) Joe Screen	5	–	–	–	5	–	–
28	(Norway) (24) Lars Gunnestad	5	–	–	4	–	1	–
29	(Poland) (24) Jacek Gollob	4	–	–	–	–	–	4
30	(Poland) (27) Jacek Krzyżaniak	3	–	3	–	–	–	–
31	(Germany) (23) Robert Barth	2	–	2	–	–	–	–
32	(United Kingdom) (24) Martin Dugard	2	–	–	–	2	–	–
33	(Poland) (23) Robert Dados	1	–	–	–	–	–	1
Pos.	Rider	Points	CZE (Czech Republic)	GER (Germany)	DEN (Denmark)	GBR (United Kingdom)	SWE (Sweden)	POL (Poland)
