= 1985 Individual Speedway Junior European Championship =

European motorcycle speedway event

European Under-21 Championship
- Venue: Abensberg Motorstadion
- Location: Abensberg, West Germany
- Start date: 14 July 1985

The 1985 Individual Speedway Junior European Championship was the ninth edition of the European motorcycle speedway Under-21 Championships.

The Championship was won by Per Jonsson.

== European final ==
- 14 July 1985
- (West Germany) Abensberg Motorstadion, Abensberg

Placing	Rider	Total	1	2	3	4	5	6	7	8	9	10	11	12	13	14	15	16	17	18	19	20	Pts	Pos	21
1	(Sweden) (14) Per Jonsson	15				3		3					3		3							3	15	1	
2	(Sweden) (5) Jimmy Nilsen	13		3			3					3					3					1	13	2	
3	(Denmark) (11) Ole Hansen	11			3				2		2					2						2	11	3	3
4	(Sweden) (13) Kenneth Nystrom	11				E	2							3		3					3		11	4	2
5	(West Germany) (15) Gerd Riss	9				2			1			X						3	3				9	5	
6	(Finland) (16) Juha Moksunen	9				1				3	1						1			3			9	6	
7	(Czechoslovakia) (2) Roman Matoušek	9	2					2				2				1				2			9	7	
8	(Italy) (6) Valentino Furlanetto	8		2				0			3							1			2		8	8	
9	(Denmark) (10) Kurt Hansen	8			2			1						2			2		1				8	9	
10	(Czechoslovakia) (3) Miroslav Prager	6	3						0				2				0				1		6	10	
11	(Soviet Union) (12) Igor Marko	6			1					2		1			2						0		6	11	
12	(Norway) (1) Einar Kyllingstad	5	1				1				0				1				2				5	12	
13	(Sweden) (7) Mikael Teurnberg	4		E					3					1	0					0			4	13	
14	(West Germany) (9) Heinz Huber	4			0		0						1					2		1			4	14	
15	(Hungary) (4) Barnabas Gyepeš	1	X							1				0				0				E	1	15	
16	(8) not started	0											-										0	16	
R1	(West Germany) (R1) Peter Hehlert	0								0						0							0	R1	
R2	(West Germany) (R2) Peter Schroek	1		1									0						0				1	R2	
Placing	Rider	Total	1	2	3	4	5	6	7	8	9	10	11	12	13	14	15	16	17	18	19	20	Pts	Pos	21

m - exclusion for exceeding two minute time allowance • t - exclusion for touching the tapes • x - other exclusion • e - retired or mechanical failure • f - fell • ns - non-starter • nc - non-classify

gate A - inside	gate B	gate C	gate D - outside
