= Cserénfa =

- Village
- Coat of arms

- Location of Somogy county in Hungary

- Location of Cserénfa
- Coordinates: 46.30962°N 17.88035°E
- Country: Hungary
- Region: Southern Transdanubia
- County: Somogy
- District: Kaposvár
- RC Diocese: Kaposvár

Area
  - Total: 17.75 km^{2} (6.85 sq mi)

Population (2017)
  - Total: 198
  - Density: 11.2/km^{2} (28.9/sq mi)
- Demonym: cserénfai
- Time zone: UTC+1 (CET)
  - Summer (DST): UTC+2 (CEST)
- Postal code: 7472
- Area code: (+36) 82
- NUTS 3 code: HU232
- MP: Attila Gelencsér (Fidesz)
- Website: Cserénfa Online

Cserénfa is a village in Somogy county, Hungary.

== Etymology ==
Its name derives from the South Slavic person name Cserin and the -fa part ist a short form of falva (English: village).

== History ==
According to László Szita the settlement was completely Hungarian in the 18th century.

== Sport ==
Cserénfa Speedway was a motorcycle speedway venue off the Fő utca. The venue hosted a qualifying round of the Speedway World Championship in 1993.

The same site was also an international motocross venue, which itself was demolished during the 1990s, with the site being marked by the motocross pálya building.
