= Kurt Hansen (speedway rider) =

Danish speedway rider

- Born: 2 October 1964 (age 62); Værløse, Denmark
- Nationality: Danish

Career history

Denmark

Great Britain
- 1984–1985: Halifax Dukes

Sweden
- 1986–1987: Lejonen
- 1989: Skepparna

Kurt Hansen (born 2 October 1964) is a former motorcycle speedway rider from Denmark. He earned one cap for the Denmark national speedway team.

== Career ==
Hansen competed in two finals of the Speedway Under-21 World Championship (known as the European Championship at the time). The first was as a reserve in the 1984 Individual Speedway Junior European Championship and the second as an outright qualifier in the 1985 Individual Speedway Junior European Championship, where he finished in 9th place.

Hansen only rode in the British leagues for two seasons (1984 and 1985) for the Halifax Dukes.

Hansen represented the Denmark national under-21 speedway team.
