= Mikael Teurnberg =

Swedish speedway rider

- Born: 26 December 1966 (age 59); Hallstavik, Sweden
- Nationality: Swedish

Career history

Sweden
- 1983–1985, 1988–2001: Rospiggarna
- 1986–1987, 2002: Bysarna

Great Britain
- 1992: Mildenhall Fen Tigers
- 1992–1993: Rye House Rockets
- 1994–1995: Arena Essex Hammers
- 1997: Oxford Cheetahs

Poland
- 2001: Orzeł Łódź

Team honours
- 1995, 1997, 2001: Elitserien champion
- 1988: Allsvenskan Div 1 Champion

Mikael Teurnberg (born 26 December 1966) is a former motorcycle speedway rider from Sweden and current team manager of Dackarna. He earned nine caps for the Sweden national speedway team.

== Career ==
Teurnberg started his career riding for Rospiggarna in 1983. He came to prominence in 1985, after reaching the final of the 1985 Junior World Championship. The following year in 1986, he reached the final for a second time.

In 1986, Teurnberg joined Bysarna from Rospiggarna but returned to the latter in 1988. After touring the UK with Rospiggarna in 1992 he made his British leagues debut with Mildenhall Fen Tigers before joining Rye House Rockets for two seasons and then Arena Essex Hammers for another two seasons.

After a final season in Britain with Oxford Cheetahs, Teurnberg rode only in Sweden. He completed 13 consecutive seasons with Rospiggarna 1988 to 2001 before a final season before retirement with Bysarna in 2002. During his time at Rospiggarna, he won the Swedish Speedway Team Championship on three occasions in 1995, 1997, and 2001.

Teurnberg was also capped by the Swedish national speedway team.

After retiring from riding, Teurnberg went into management and currently is the team manager for Dackarna.
