= Lars Gunnestad =

Norwegian speedway rider (born 1971)

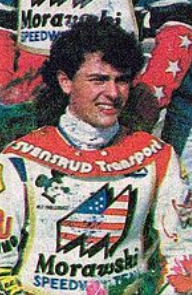
- Born: 18 February 1971 (age 55); Drammen, Norway
- Nationality: Norwegian

Career history

Great Britain
- 1991: Sheffield Tigers
- 1993–1998, 2000–2002: Poole Pirates

Poland
- 1991–1992: Zielona Góra
- 1993: Bydgoszcz
- 2000–2001: Rybnik
- 2003: Ostrów

Norway
- 1991, 1999: NMK Drammen

Sweden
- 1987: Piraterna
- 1988–2004: Indianerna
- 2005: Valsarna

Individual honours
- 1988, 1990, 1991, 1992, 1993, 1995, 1998, 1999, 2001, 2003: Norwegian Champion

Team honours
- 1990, 1991: Elitserien Champion
- 1994: British League Champion
- 2002: Craven Shield Winner

Lars Gunnestad (born 18 February 1971) is a former Norwegian international motorcycle speedway rider. He won the Individual Speedway Norwegian Championship a record ten times and earned 22 caps for the Norway national speedway team.

== Career ==
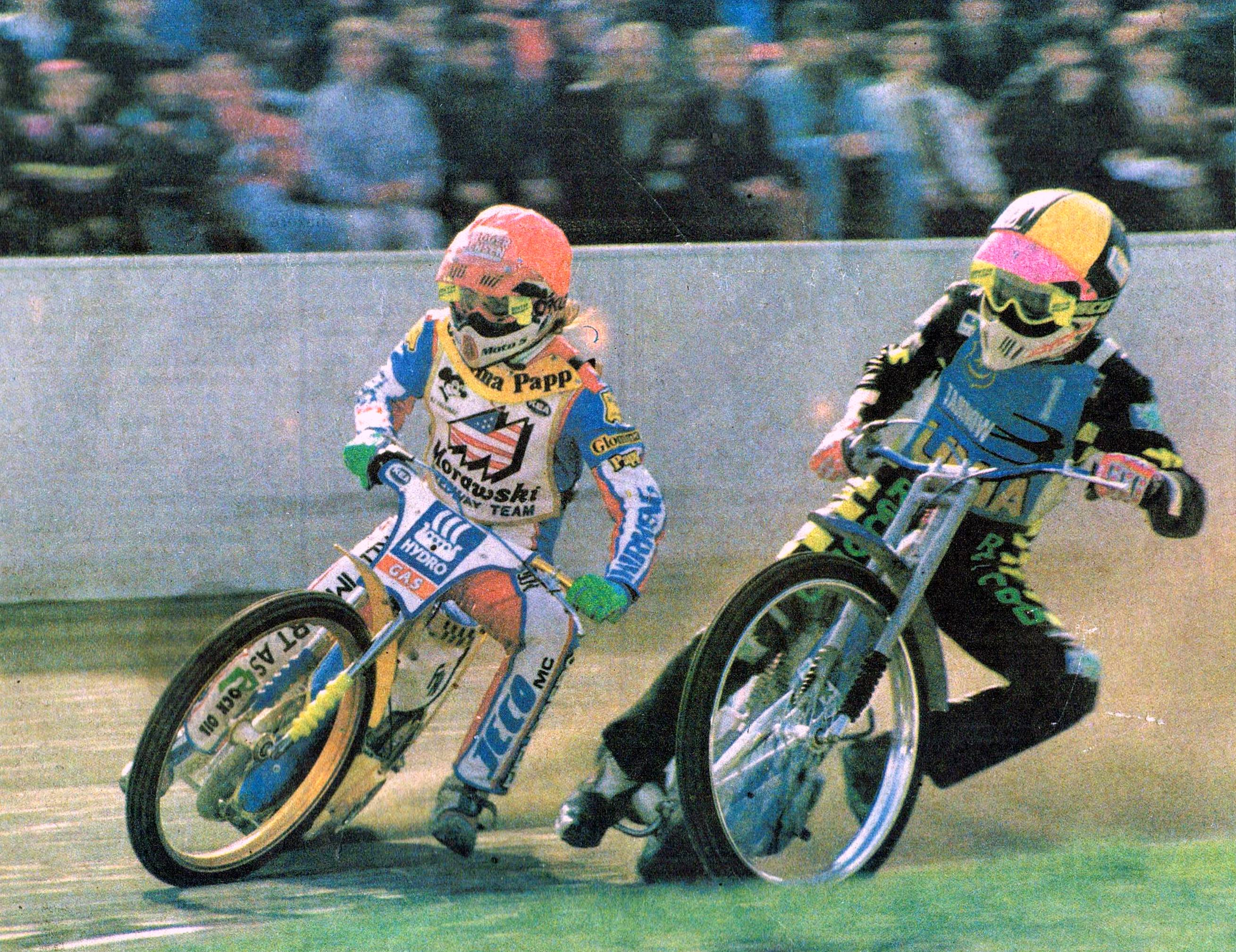
Lars Gunnestad and Rinat Mardanshin. Polish league. 1992

Gunnestad was born on 18 February 1971 in Drammen, Norway. He first came to prominence in 1988, when he won his first Norwegian title at the age of 17. His first British club was Sheffield in 1991, who competed in the British League Division Two. Gunnestad missed the British speedway season in 1992 despite signing for Poole Pirates, but returned in 1993 to compete in the British League for Poole Pirates, with whom he would spend this rest of his British career.

Gunnestad became a popular rider at Poole and eventually received a testimonial meeting there in 2001. He appeared in five Speedway Grand Prix meetings as a wild card.

== Speedway Grand Prix results ==
1995 SGP
	Grand Prix	Pos.	Pts.	Heats	Draw
1 (1)	(Denmark) Vojens	11	9	(1,1,1,2,1) +1C	13

1998 SGP
	Grand Prix	Pos.	Pts.	Heats	Draw
1 (2)	(Denmark) Vojens	18	4	(0,3,1)	24
2 (3)	(Sweden) Linköping	24	1	(0,X)	24

2002 SGP
	Grand Prix	Pos.	Pts.	Heats	Draw
1 (4)	(Norway) Hamar	13	6	(3,2)(0,1)	23

2003 SGP
	Grand Prix	Pos.	Pts.	Heats	Draw
1 (5)	(Norway) Hamar	18	4	(0,2,1)	23

permanent speedway rider
wild card, track reserve or qualified reserve
rider not classified (track reserve who did not start)

== World Longtrack Championship ==
- 1994 Semi-final
- 1995 Semi-final
- 1996 - (Germany) Herxheim (18th) 3pts

== Personal life ==
Gunnestad's sons, Lars Daniel Gunnestad and Thomas Gunnestad, were both speedway riders. Lars Daniel won the 2011 Norwegian Championship and Thomas won the 2012 Norwegian Championship.

== See also ==
- Norway national speedway team
- List of Speedway Grand Prix riders
