= Chris Louis =

British motorcycle speedway rider

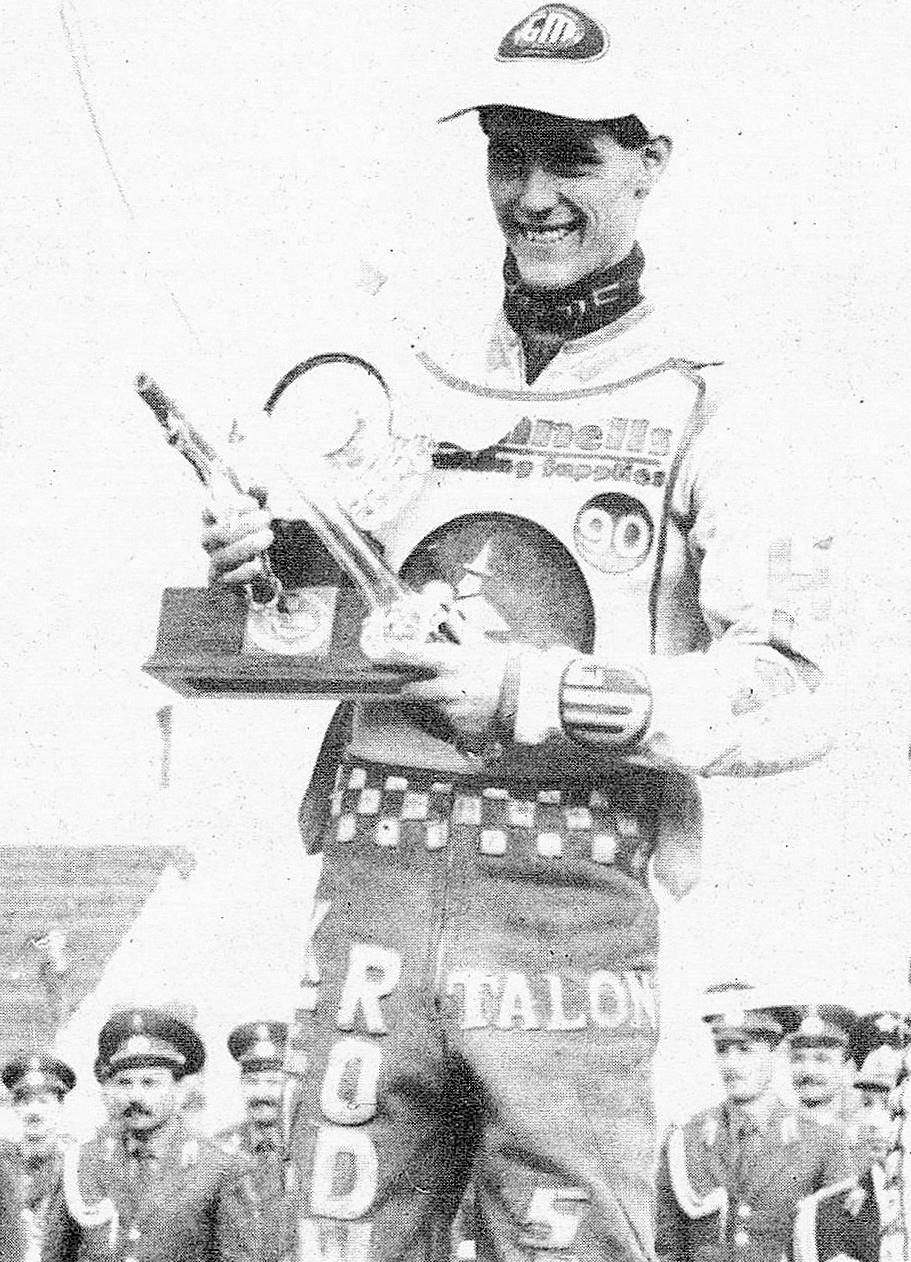
- Chris Louis. U-21 WC 1990, Lvov.
- Born: 9 July 1969 (age 57); Ipswich, England
- Nationality: British (English)

Career history

Great Britain
- 1988: Hackney Kestrels
- 1989–2002, 2004–2008: Ipswich Witches

Sweden
- 1994–1996, 2001: Bysarna
- 1998–2000, 2002: Örnarna
- 2007: Kaparna

Individual honours
- 1990: World Under-21 Champion
- 1998, 2000: British Champion

Team honours
- 2000: European Club Champion
- 1998: Elite League Champion
- 1998: Elite League KO Cup Winner
- 1998: Craven Shield Winner
- 1991: Elite League Four Team Champion
- 1988: National League Champion
- 1988: National League KO Cup Winner

Christopher Louis (born 9 July 1969) is a former international motorcycle speedway rider from England, who primarily rode for the Ipswich Witches. He earned 41 international caps for the England national speedway team and three caps for the Great Britain team. He is the son of former Great Britain International John Louis.

== Career ==
Louis is former schoolboy grasstrack champion. He started his professional career at Hackney before moving to Ipswich in 1989 where he rode to the end of his riding career. He has missed a couple of seasons due to injury. He became the World Under-21 Champion after winning the 1990 Individual Speedway Junior World Championship.

Louis made history in 1993 when he became the first son of a former World Finalist to also qualify for the World Final when he finished in third place in Pocking, Germany. Louis tied with former champion Hans Nielsen of Denmark in 11 points, only one point behind winner Sam Ermolenko of the United States. In a run-off to decide overall second place, Nielsen defeated Louis who had to settle for third in his World Final debut.

Louis also qualified for the 1994 World Final in Vojens, Denmark but was unable to repeat his 1993 form and finished a disappointing 12th scoring only six points.

Louis qualified for the new Speedway Grand Prix series which replaced the former World Final in 1995. He finished a career best seventh in the 1995 SGP with a best finish of third in 1995 Speedway Grand Prix of Poland. In 1996, he was extremely unfortunate not to be crowned the Premier League Riders Champion, after an engine failure denied him when he was leading on the last lap of the final.

Louis continued to take part in the SGP series as a regular rider until 2000, with his best finishes being second placings in the 1998 Danish and Swedish GP's and the 1999 British GP. He rode in selected events in 2001 before making his last appearance as wild card in 2004.

During his career, Louis won trophies in the UK, Poland, Sweden and Germany, and in 1998 and 2000 he followed his father's footsteps by becoming British Speedway Champion (John Louis won in 1975). Louis remained an ever present for Ipswich for 19 seasons, from 1989 to 2008, with the exception of missing the 2003 season with a back injury.

Louis maintained his relationship with Ipswich becoming both their team manager and promoter but he stepped down as team manager in 2014. He remained as promoter leading into the SGB Premiership 2025 season.

== World Final appearances ==
- 1993 – (Germany) Pocking, Rottalstadion – 3rd – 11pts + 2pts
- 1994 – (Denmark) Vojens, Speedway Center – 12th – 6pts

== Speedway Grand Prix results ==
Year	Position	Points	Best finish	Notes
1995	7th	77	3rd	3rd Polish GP
1996	8th	54	5th	Best finish in German GP
1997	9th	59	5th	Best finish in Danish GP
1998	5th	59	2nd	2nd in Denmark and Sweden
1999	12th	50	2nd	2nd in British GP
2000	10th	60	3rd	Best finish in Czech Republic and Poland
2001	27th	6	19th	Best finish in German GP
2004	32nd	4		
