= Andy Smith (speedway rider) =

British speedway rider

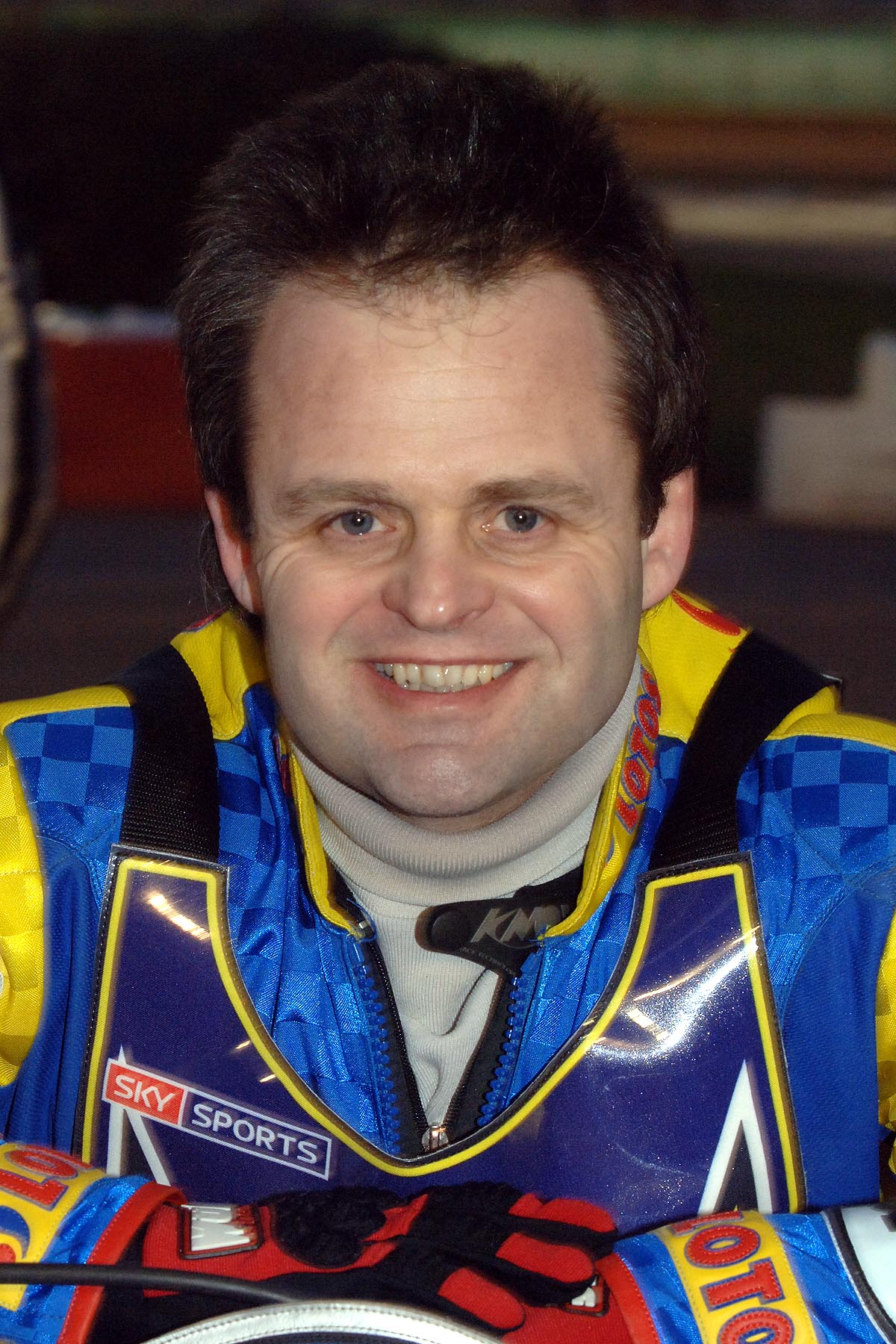
- Andy Smith in 2007
- Born: 25 May 1966 (age 60); York, England
- Nationality: British (English)

Career history

Great Britain
- 1982–1988, 1998–2001, 2005: Belle Vue Aces
- 1989–1990: Bradford Dukes
- 1991, 1998, 2004: Swindon Robins
- 1992–1995, 1997: Coventry Bees
- 2003, 2007: Oxford Cheetahs
- 2006–2007: Reading Racers

Sweden
- 1991, 1993–1994: Smederna
- 1992: Skepparna
- 1999: Örnarna
- 2001–2003: Masarna

Poland
- 1992–1995, 1998, 2004: Bydgoszcz
- 1996: Rzeszów
- 1997: Tarnów
- 1999–2000: Piła
- 2001: Leszno
- 2002-2003: Warszawa
- 2005: Toruń
- 2006–2007: Gdańsk

Individual honours
- 1993, 1994, 1995: British Champion
- 1985: Peter Craven Memorial Winner

Team honours
- 1982, 1992: British League Champion
- 2005: Knockout Cup
- 1997: Craven Shield Winner
- 1990: Gold Cup Winner
- 1983: British League Cup Winner

Andrew Smith (born 25 May 1966) is a retired motorcycle speedway rider from England. He earned 29 international caps for the England national speedway team.

== Career ==
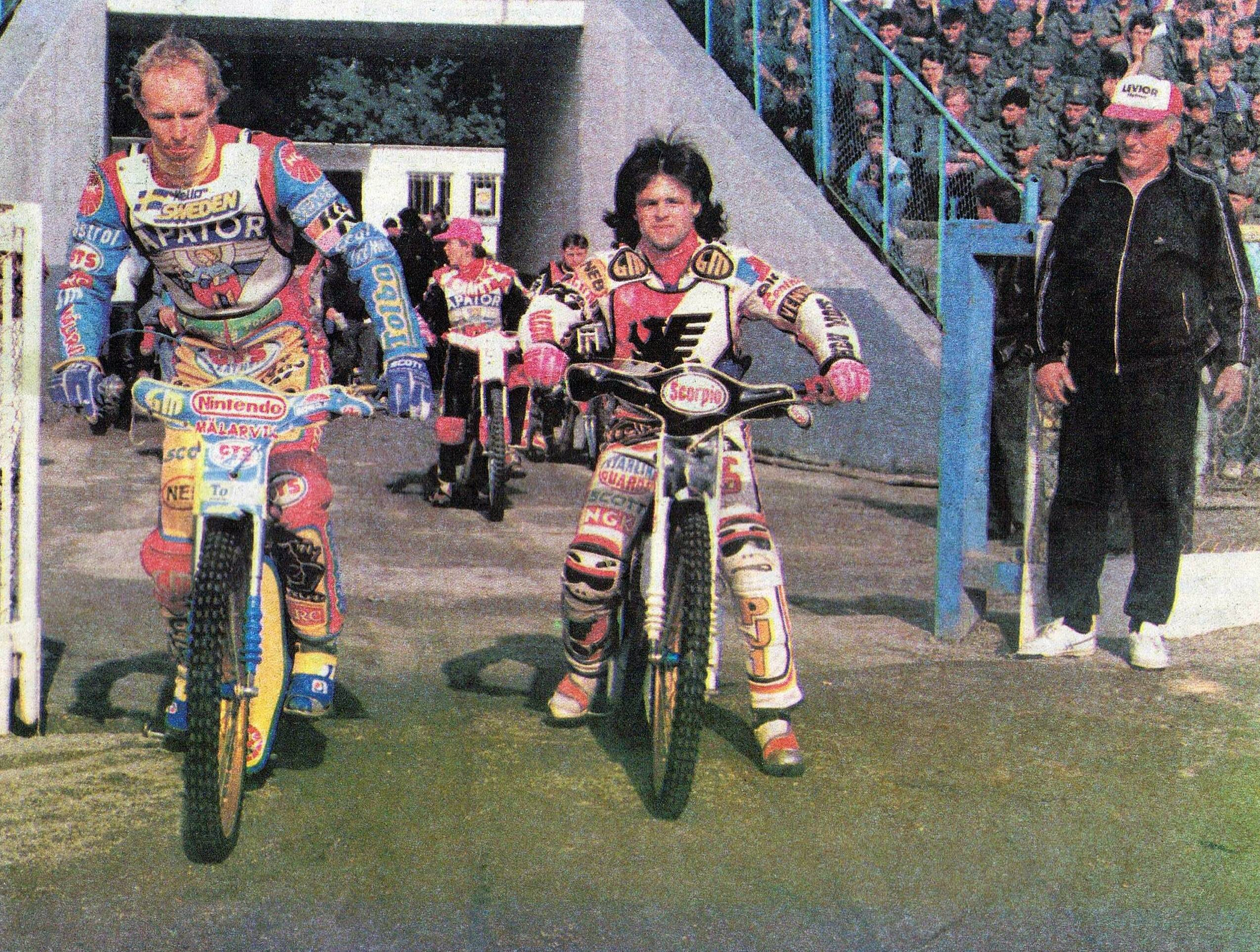
Andy Smith (centre), 1992

Smith spent the first seven years of his career riding for the Belle Vue Aces from 1982 to 1988. He then joined Bradford Dukes for two British League seasons and began to build a reputation as one of Britain's leading riders. Smith also rode in Australia, including the 1990/91 Australian season when he based himself at Claremont Speedway in Perth, Western Australia. Despite Claremont being almost twice the length of most British tracks, on 18 January 1991 Smith defeated home town hero, and twice Australian Champion Glenn Doyle in the King of Claremont Classic. Smith also finished 2nd to Sweden's Dennis Löfqvist at the 1990 Boxing Day International at the Melbourne Showgrounds.

After joining the Coventry Bees in 1992 Smith went on to win the British Speedway Championship three times in a row in 1993, 1994, and 1995, giving him the distinction of being one of only three riders ever to achieve this feat. He rode for Coventry for four seasons but did return for the 1997 season.

From 1998 until 2001, Smith rode a second stint at Belle Vue and recorded a 8.27 average during the 1999 Elite League speedway season. He did not ride in the United Kingdom for the 2002 season, spending his time in Poland.

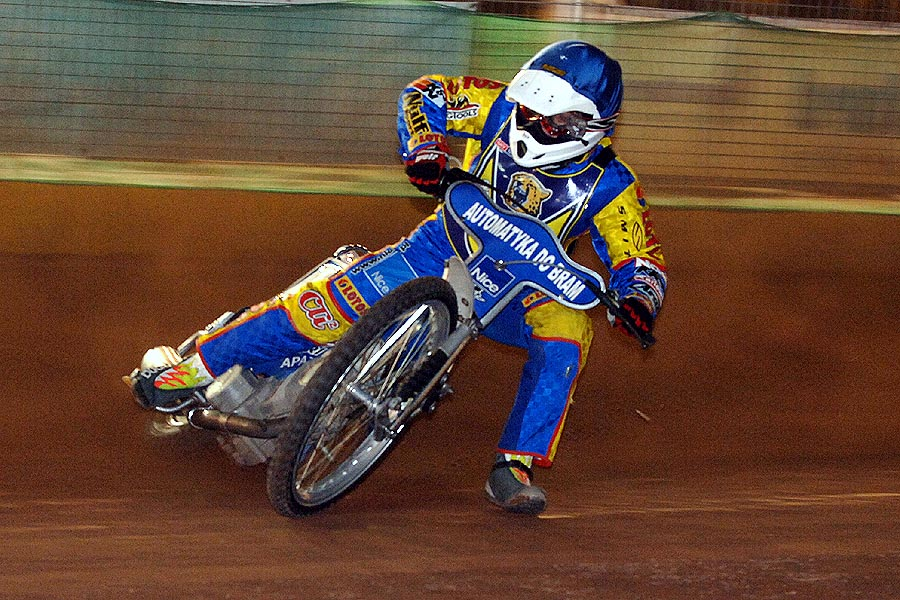
Smith riding for Oxford

In 2003, Smith returned to the UK and signed for Oxford (known as the Silver Machine at the time) for the 2003 Elite League speedway season. He then rode for Swindon Robins in 2004 before returning to his first club Belle Vue for the 2005 Elite League speedway season, where he helped the club win the Elite League Knockout Cup.

Smith would spend 16 seasons racing in the Polish leagues after making his Polish league debut in 1992. He also continued to ride for various clubs in England until the end of the 2007 seasons.

During his career, Smith reached two World finals and rode in the Speedway Grand Prix for eight years. He represented Great Britain and his appearances included a Speedway World Cup, which was the 1999 Speedway World Team Cup.

== Family ==
Smith's son Jack is a speedway rider.

== World Final Appearances ==
=== Individual World Championship ===
- 1989 - (West Germany) Munich, Olympic Stadium - 7th - 10pts
- 1993 - (Germany) Pocking, Rottalstadion - 5th - 10pts

=== World Team Cup ===
- 1999 - (Czech Republic) Pardubice, Svítkova Stadion (with Chris Louis / Carl Stonehewer / Joe Screen / Mark Loram) - 4th - 29pts (0)

== Speedway Grand Prix results ==
| Year | Position | Points | Best Finish | Notes |
|---|---|---|---|---|
| 1995 | 19th | 34 | 6th | |
| 1996 | 17th | 19 | 8th | |
| 1997 | 14th | 22 | 9th | |
| 1998 | 14th | 43 | 6th | |
| 1999 | 20th | 22 | 13th | |
| 2000 | 25th | 10 | 19th | |
| 2001 | 22nd | 12 | 17th | |
| 2002 | 20th | 29 | 13th | |

== See also ==
- List of Speedway Grand Prix riders

== World Longtrack Championship ==
Finals

- 1991 – (Czech Republic) Mariánské Lázně 10pts (8th)
- 1992 – (Germany) Pfarrkirchen 5pts (12th)
