= Hans Nielsen (speedway rider) =

Danish speedway rider

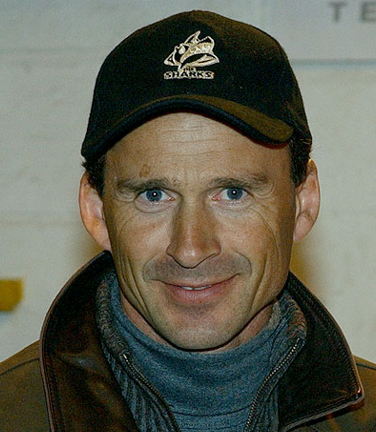
- Hans Nielsen in 2004
- Born: 26 December 1959 (age 66); Brovst, Denmark
- Nationality: Danish

Career history

Denmark
- 1984–1999: Brovst

Great Britain
- 1977–1980: Wolverhampton Wolves
- 1981–1983: Birmingham Brummies
- 1984–1992: Oxford Cheetahs
- 1993–1994: Coventry Bees

Poland
- 1990–1993: Motor Lublin
- 1994–1999: Polonia Piła

Sweden
- 1990–1991: Vetlanda

Individual honours
- 1986, 1987, 1989, 1995: World Individual Champion
- 1978, 1982, 1987, 1990, 1993, 1994: Danish Champion
- 1976: Danish Under-21 Champion
- 1986, 1987, 1990: British League Riders’ Champion
- 1983: Intercontinental Champion
- 1980, 1982, 1983, 1984, 1986, 1988, 1989, 1991, 1994: Nordic Champion
- 1987, 1998: Golden Helmet of Pardubice
- 1979, 1985: Midland Riders’ Champion
- 1981: Internationale
- 1982, 1984, 1988: Olympique
- 1982, 1984, 1985, 1986, 1987: Star of Anglia
- 1983, 1991: The Laurels
- 1983, 1985, 1987, 1999: Golden Gala – Italy
- 1983, 1984, 1988: Danish Gold Bar
- 1983: Golden Sovereign
- 1984: Pride of the Midlands winner
- 1984: Pride of the East winner
- 1985: Brandonapolis
- 1986: Daily Mirror/Weslake 16-Lapper
- 1988: Golden Hammer
- 1990: Littlechild Trophy

Team honours
- 1978, 1981, 1983, 1984, 1985, 1986, 1987, 1988, 1991, 1995, 1997: World Team Cup winner
- 1979, 1986, 1987, 1988, 1989, 1990, 1991: World Pairs Champion
- 1985, 1986, 1989: British League Champion
- 1985, 1986 (shared): British League KO Cup Winner
- 1986 (shared): British League Cup
- 1985, 1986, 1987: British League Pairs Champion
- 1985, 1986: Midland Cup

Competition record

Representing Denmark

Speedway World Championship
Gold medal – first place	1986	
Gold medal – first place	1987	
Gold medal – first place	1989	
Gold medal – first place	1995	
Silver medal – second place	1984	
Silver medal – second place	1985	
Silver medal – second place	1988	
Silver medal – second place	1993	
Silver medal – second place	1994	
Silver medal – second place	1996	
Bronze medal – third place	1991	
Bronze medal – third place	1999	

Speedway World Team Cup
Gold medal – first place	1978	
Gold medal – first place	1981	
Gold medal – first place	1983	
Gold medal – first place	1984	
Gold medal – first place	1985	
Gold medal – first place	1986	
Gold medal – first place	1987	
Gold medal – first place	1988	
Gold medal – first place	1991	
Gold medal – first place	1995	
Gold medal – first place	1997	
Silver medal – second place	1979	
Silver medal – second place	1982	
Silver medal – second place	1989	
Silver medal – second place	1993	
Bronze medal – third place	1990	
Bronze medal – third place	1994	
Bronze medal – third place	1996	
Bronze medal – third place	1998	

Speedway World Pairs Championship
Gold medal – first place	1979	
Gold medal – first place	1986	
Gold medal – first place	1987	
Gold medal – first place	1988	
Gold medal – first place	1989	
Gold medal – first place	1990	
Gold medal – first place	1991	
Silver medal – second place	1984	
Bronze medal – third place	1980	
Bronze medal – third place	1982	
Bronze medal – third place	1983	
Bronze medal – third place	1993	

Intercontinental Championship
Gold medal – first place	1983	
Silver medal – second place	1986	
Silver medal – second place	1988	
Bronze medal – third place	1981	
Bronze medal – third place	1985	
Bronze medal – third place	1987	
Bronze medal – third place	1989	
Bronze medal – third place	1990	

Speedway Champions Cup
Gold medal – first place	1990	
Bronze medal – third place	1991	

Golden Helmet
Gold medal – first place	1987	
Gold medal – first place	1998	
Bronze medal – third place	1995	

Hans Hollen Nielsen (born 26 December 1959) is a Danish former professional motorcycle speedway rider. He competed in the Speedway World Championships from 1977 to 1999. Nielsen is notable for winning four Speedway World Championship titles. During his career, he won a total of 22 world championships, making him arguably the most successful speedway rider of all time. In 2012, Nielsen was named an FIM Legend for his motorcycling achievements. He later managed the Danish national team.

== Career ==
Nielsen was born in Arentsminde near Brovst, Denmark. He was one of, if not the most successful riders the sport has ever seen. Altogether he participated in winning 22 World Championships for Denmark (out of the 46 won by Danish riders/teams in all competitions to the end of 2014). This included the individual World Championship in 1986, 1987 (the only time the final was held over two days), 1989 and the first ever championship ran in the Grand Prix format in 1995. Nielsen and Sweden's Tony Rickardsson are the only 2 riders to have won world titles in both the old single meeting format and the Speedway Grand Prix series.

Nielsen was known as "The Main Dane" to fans, taking over the title from triple World Champion Ole Olsen, but was referred to as "The Professor" by his fellow riders due to his immaculate style and ability to ride speedway. Nielsen won the Danish Championship in 1978, 1982, 1987, 1990, 1993 and 1994. He was also the Nordic Champion in 1980, 1982, 1983, 1984, 1986, 1988, 1989, 1991 and 1994 as well as winning the Intercontinental Final in 1983.

Nielsen rode in the British League for the Oxford Cheetahs from 1984 to 1992. In 1986 he recorded a league average of 11.57, his average in away league matches that season was a perfect 12.00. With the Cheetahs, Nielsen won the British League Riders' Championship in 1986, 1987 and 1990, the British League Pairs Championship with Simon Wigg in 1985 and 1986 and in 1987 with Andy Grahame, the British League in 1985, 1986 and 1989, as well as winning the British League Knockout Cup in 1985 and 1986. He was also the 1984 "Pride of the Midlands" winner at the Norfolk Arena in King's Lynn.

Nielsen was successful almost everywhere he rode. As well as his World Championship winning feats in Europe, he would win the Speedway World Team Cup as part of the Danish team in the USA in 1985 and 1988, as well as winning major meetings in Australia, including the 1987 West End Speedway International at the Wayville Showground in Adelaide.

Nielsen rode in a record 18 straight Speedway World Team Cup Finals for Denmark between 1978 and 1995, winning 10 which included a record six in a row from 1983 until 1988 and finishing on the podium a record 14 times in a row between 1978 and 1991. Denmark were the favourites to win again in 1989 at the Odsal Stadium in Bradford, but would eventually finish third after the opening heat crash which ended the career and nearly took the life of Nielsen's friend, teammate and closest rival, triple World Champion Erik Gundersen.

Nielsen also represented Denmark in the World Pairs Championship on 14 occasions from 1979 until 1993, following which the Pairs Championship was merged with the World Team Cup. He won the Pairs title in 1979 with Ole Olsen, 1986, 1987, 1988 and 1989 with Erik Gundersen, 1990 with Jan O. Pedersen and 1991 with Pedersen and Tommy Knudsen.

== By year ==
1977
Nielsen aged just 17, signed for Wolverhampton Wolves for the 1977 British League season recording a healthy 7.25 average.

1978
Nielsen won his first Danish Championship and rode in the 1978 European Under-21 Final at the Pista Olimpia Terenzano in Lonigo, Italy where he finished 5th with 11 points. The European U/21 Championship was later renamed the World U/21 Championship in 1988. He topped the Wolves averages in just his second year with them.

1979
Nielsen won the World Pairs with Ole Olsen and finished runner-up to Jan Andersson in the Scandinavian final. In his third season with Wolverhampton he finished 5th in the 1979 British League season averages and topped the Wolves averages.

1980
Nielsen reached his first World individual final at the 1980 Individual Speedway World Championship, finishing 11th in Gothenburg. He had won the Scandinavian final on his way to the final. During the 1980 British League season he topped the averages on 10.69 riding for Wolves. After the season had ended he put in a transfer request but Wolverhampton then withdrew from the British League.

1981
Nielsen appeared in his second World final at the 1981 Individual Speedway World Championship, where he improved two places on the previous year, finishing in 9th place at Wembley Stadium. He was allocated to Birmingham Brummies for the 1981 British League season.

1982
A seventh-place finish in Nielsen's third world final constituted another two place improvement. He also won his second Danish Championship.

1983
Nielsen finished seventh in his fourth world individual final, this was a disappointment for Nielsen who expected to go better. During the 1983 World Pairs Final at the Ullevi Stadium in Gothenburg, Sweden, Nielsen was involved in one of the more bizarre tape exclusions ever seen in speedway. While lining up for the start of Heat 10 against eventual champions England, represented by 1976 World Champion Peter Collins and the highly rated Kenny Carter, Nielsen was in gate 2 and initially attempted to line up across on Carter on his inside before being forced by the official to move as he was deemed to be across the line and out of his gate. After moving he then almost broke the tapes once before coming forward again, this time actually falling over his handlebars and onto the track as he tried to stop his bike which had actually rolled over the tapes (without breaking them), leaving Australian referee Sam Bass no option but to exclude him from the race. During the 1983 British League season Nielsen topped the league averages for Birmingham Brummies with a 10.82 average.

1984
A winner of the Scandinavian final on the way to his fifth world final at the 1984 Individual Speedway World Championship, where he finished runner-up to his great rival Erik Gundersen. Nielsen defeated American Lance King in the silver medal run-off. Earlier in the year Nielsen was signed by Oxford Cheetahs on their return to the British League for a record £30,000, Oxford also signed Simon Wigg for £25,000, Marvyn Cox for £15,000, Melvyn Taylor for £12,000 and Jens Rasmussen. Nielsen topped the league averages with 10.76.

1985
Nielsen won the Danish final with a perfect 15 point maximum but finished runner-up once again to the defending champion Erik Gundersen in the 1985 Individual Speedway World Championship. He helped the Oxford Cheetahs team win the league and cup double during a 1985 British League season. Nielsen topped the league averages with an incredible 11.35.

1986
After winning both the Danish and Nordic qualifying finals, Nielsen finally won his first world title after finishing in second place during the two previous Championships. In the 1986 Individual Speedway World Championship he lost his first ride to Erik Gundersen but then won his next four rides to be crowned the champion. Fellow Dane Jan O. Pedersen took silver and England's Kelvin Tatum took the bronze while Gundersen faded into tenth place. Despite his rivalry with Gundersen he teamed up with him in the World Pairs winning the gold medal. He helped the Oxford Cheetahs team win the league and cup double for the second consecutive season during a 1986 British League season. Nielsen topped the league averages with a record 11.57 and won the British League Riders' Championship, held at Hyde Road on 12 October.

1987
Nielsen won his second individual world crown by winning the 1987 Individual Speedway World Championship. In a two-day final in Amsterdam, Nielsen trailed after day one by 1 point to Erik Gundersen and the American Sam Ermolenko. However, in trademark style Nielsen produced a 15-point maximum on day two to wrap up the World Title, with Gundersen claiming silver and Ermolenko bronze. He also won a third World Pairs and third Danish title and the prestigious Golden Helmet of Pardubice in Czech Republic (one of the world's oldest speedway races). In the 1987 British League season Nielsen finished top of the British league averages (11.38) for a remarkable fifth season running and retained the British League Riders' Championship.

1988
Nielsen was denied a third world title in his home country at Vojens in the 1988 Individual Speedway World Championship. The Gundersen-Nielsen rivalry continued with both finishing on 13 points to tie for the lead of the Championship. However it was Gundersen that won the toss to choose his starting gate for the run-off. He chose the outside and on a wet track he won his third title by defeating Nielsen in the run-off. Nielsen won a fourth World Pairs and extended his average topping record, a sixth consecutive season during the 1988 British League season.

1989
A third World title at the Olympic Stadium in Munich was well deserved after a 15-point maximum. Nielsen joined fellow Danes Ole Olsen and Erik Gundersen as a three time Speedway World Champion. Nielsen also helped Oxford Cheetahs to another title and topped the averages for the seventh season running, during the 1989 British League season. In a memorable season he also won a fourth consecutive World Pairs (fifth in total).

1990
Nielsen finished fourth at the 1990 Individual Speedway World Championship and was champion of Denmark for the fourth time. Nielsen topped the league averages for the eighth season running and last time during the 1990 British League season. His consistency that led to being the top rider for eight seasons running was a unique achievement. He won a fifth consecutive World Pairs (sixth in total). He also won the British League Riders' Championship for the third time.

1991
Nielsen won the bronze medal run-off beating Tommy Knudsen at the 1991 Individual Speedway World Championship in Gothenburg. There was consolation in winning a sixth consecutive World Pairs (seventh in total and a record for any rider).

1992

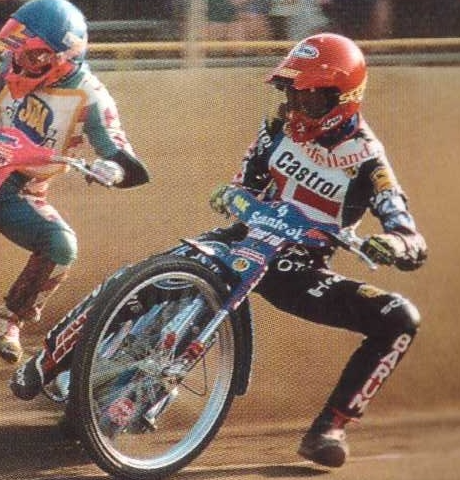
Nielsen in Danish colours in 1992

Nielsen failed to qualify for the world final for the first time since 1979 after finishing 12th in the Nordic Final.

1993
Neilsen had another excellent performance in the 1993 Individual Speedway World Championship but was unable to win the fourth title he was seeking, he had to settle for the runner-up position behind Sam Ermolenko. He was champion of Denmark for the fifth time. He was forced to leave his beloved Oxford Cheetahs following their decision not to compete in the top division, he joined the Coventry Bees.

1994

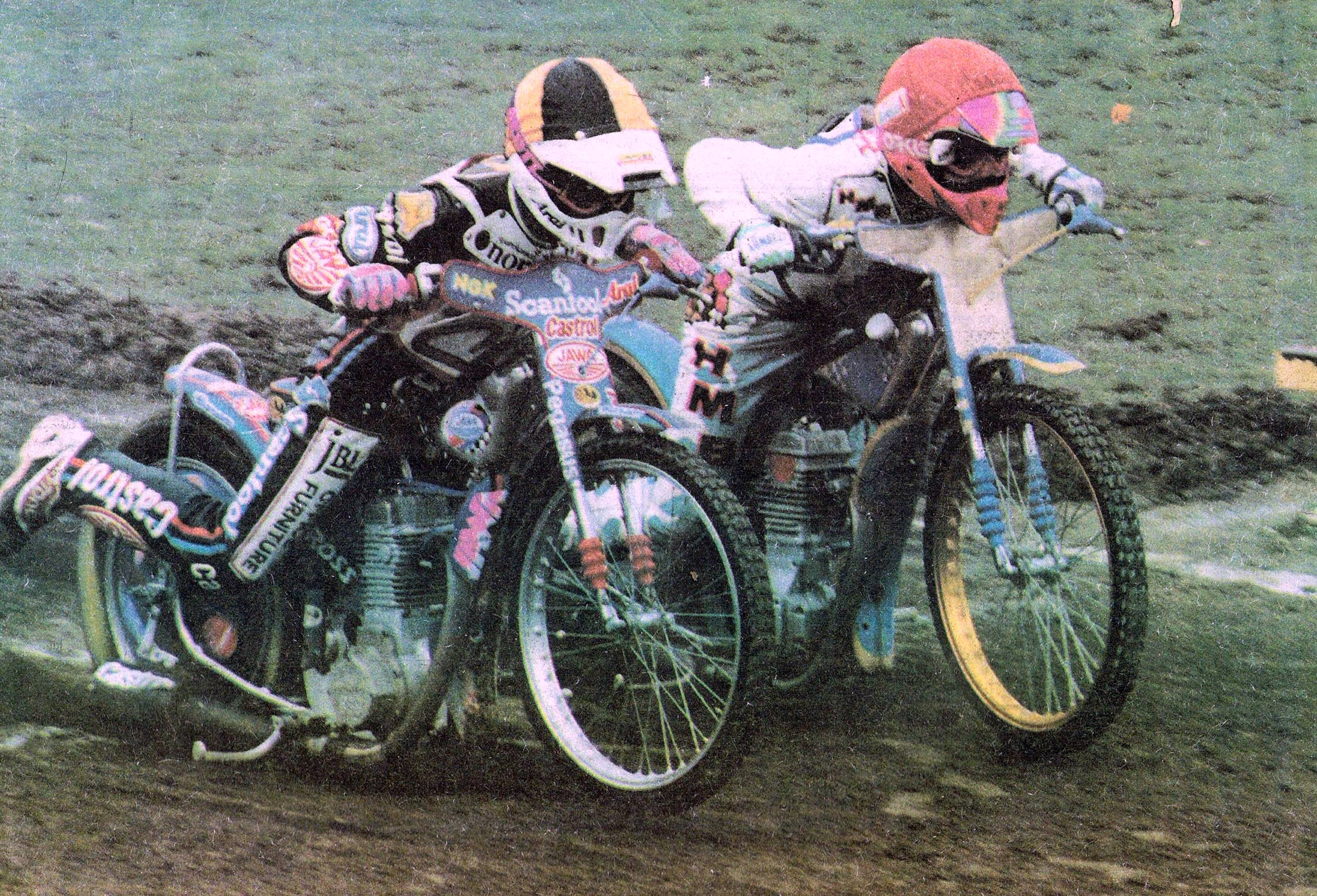
Hans Nielsen (left), 1994

Nielsen just failed to win his fourth World title in the 1984 Individual Speedway World Championship after losing a run-off to Swede Tony Rickardsson in the last ever one-off race final. It was also the sixth and last time he was champion of Denmark and his last season in the British leagues.

1995
In the first Grand Prix six race series (the new format for the World Championship), Nielsen claimed his fourth world title. He won with a commanding 103 points, which was 15 points clear of his nearest rival Rickardsson. It would be his last individual World title.

1996
Nielsen was set to win his fifth world crown with a nine-point lead going into the last of the six events at Vojens in the World Championship Grand Prix series. However Billy Hamill won the event gaining 25 points and Nielsen only managed 14 points leaving the Dane two points behind the American in the final standings.

1997
During the 1997 Speedway Grand Prix, Nielsen won the 1997 Speedway Grand Prix of Germany but finished 7th in the World title standings behind Greg Hancock.

1998
During the 1998 Speedway Grand Prix, Nielsen won the 1998 Speedway Grand Prix of Denmark but finished fourth in the World title standings behind Tony Rickardsson. He won his second Golden Helmet of Pardubice in the Czech Republic.

1999
In his last World Championship during the 1999 Speedway Grand Prix, Nielsen won the 1999 Speedway Grand Prix of Poland II and won the bronze medal in the World title standings behind Rickardsson.

== Retirement ==
Nielsen retired at the end of 1999 having finished third in the 1999 Speedway Grand Prix series, proving he could still win by winning the Grand Prix of Poland II in Bydgoszcz. Many judges, from other riders, the media and the fans, feel he was the greatest rider of all time.

After retiring, Nielsen returned to Denmark, where he continued playing golf in his spare time. He became the Danish national team manager in June 2016, a post which he held until February 2023.

== World final appearances ==
=== Individual World Championship results timeline ===
World Final/Speedway Grand Prix results timeline
Year	1978	1979	1980	1981	1982	1983	1984	1985	1986	1987	1988
Finishing position	-	-	11	9	7	7	2	2	1	1	2
Year	1989	1990	1991	1992	1993	1994	1995	1996	1997	1998	1999
Finishing position	1	4	3	-	2	2	1	2	7	4	3

=== Individual World Championship ===
- 1980 - (Sweden) Gothenburg, Ullevi - 11th - 7pts
- 1981 - (England) London, Wembley Stadium - 9th - 6pts
- 1982 - (United States) Los Angeles, Memorial Coliseum - 7th - 8pts
- 1983 - (West Germany) Norden, Motodrom Halbemond - 7th - 9pts
- 1984 - (Sweden) Gothenburg, Ullevi - 2nd - 13pts + 3pts
- 1985 - (England) Bradford, Odsal Stadium - 2nd - 13pts + 2pts
- 1986 - (Poland) Chorzów, Silesian Stadium - Winner - 14pts
- 1987 - (Netherlands) Amsterdam, Olympic Stadium - Winner - 27pts
- 1988 - (Denmark) Vojens, Speedway Center - 2nd - 14pts + 2pts
- 1989 - (Germany) Munich, Olympic Stadium - Winner - 15pts
- 1990 - (England) Bradford, Odsal Stadium - 4th - 11pts
- 1991 - (Sweden) Gothenburg, Ullevi - 3rd - 11pts + 3pts
- 1993 - (Germany) Pocking, Rottalstadion - 2nd - 11pts + 3pts
- 1994 - (Denmark) Vojens, Speedway Center - 2nd - 12pts + 2pts
- 1995 - Speedway Grand Prix - Winner - 103pts
- 1996 - Speedway Grand Prix - 2nd - 111pts
- 1997 - Speedway Grand Prix - 7th - 75pts
- 1998 - Speedway Grand Prix - 4th - 76pts
- 1999 - Speedway Grand Prix - 3rd - 76pts

=== World Pairs Championship ===
- 1979 - (Denmark) Vojens, Speedway Center (with Ole Olsen) - Winner - 25pts (15)
- 1980 - (Socialist Federal Republic of Yugoslavia) Krško, Matija Gubec Stadium (with Ole Olsen) - 3rd - 21pts (8)
- 1981 - (Poland) Chorzów, Silesian Stadium (with Ole Olsen) - 5th - 17pts (7)
- 1982 - (Australia) Sydney, Liverpool City Raceway (with Ole Olsen) - 3rd - 21pts (10)
- 1983 - (Sweden) Gothenburg, Ullevi (with Erik Gundersen) - 3rd - 19pts (11)
- 1984 - (Italy) Lonigo, Santa Marina Stadium (with Erik Gundersen) - 2nd - 25+3pts (15+3)
- 1986 - (West Germany) Pocking, Rottalstadion (with Erik Gundersen) - Winner - 46+5pts (27+5)
- 1987 - (Czechoslovakia) Pardubice, Svítkov Stadion (with Erik Gundersen) - Winner - 52pts (26)
- 1988 - (England) Bradford, Odsal Stadium (with Erik Gundersen) - Winner - 45pts (27)
- 1989 - (Poland) Leszno, Alfred Smoczyk Stadium (with Erik Gundersen) - Winner - 48pts (28)
- 1990 - (West Germany) Landshut, Ellermühle Stadium (with Jan O. Pedersen) - Winner - 43pts (19)
- 1991 - (Poland) Poznań, Olimpia Poznań Stadium (with Jan O. Pedersen / Tommy Knudsen) - Winner - 28pts (14)
- 1992 - (Italy) Lonigo, Santa Marina Stadium (with Brian Karger / Tommy Knudsen) - 5th - 16pts (13)
- 1993 - (Denmark) Vojens, Speedway Center (with Tommy Knudsen / Brian Karger) - 3rd - 21pts (14)

=== World Team Cup ===
- 1978 - (West Germany) Landshut, Stadion Ellermühle (with Ole Olsen / Mike Lohmann / Finn Thomsen) - Winner - 37pts (11)
- 1979 - (England) London, White City Stadium (with Ole Olsen / Mike Lohmann / Finn Thomsen / Bo Petersen) - 2nd - 31pts (9)
- 1981 - (West Germany) Olching, Olching Speedwaybahn (with Ole Olsen / Erik Gundersen / Tommy Knudsen / Finn Thomsen) - Winner - 36pts (11)
- 1982 - (England) London, White City Stadium (with Ole Olsen / Erik Gundersen / Preben Eriksen / Tommy Knudsen) - 2nd - 27pts (11)
- 1983 - (Denmark) Vojens, Speedway Center (with Ole Olsen / Erik Gundersen / Finn Thomsen / Peter Ravn) - Winner - 37pts (11)
- 1984 - (Poland) Leszno, Alfred Smoczyk Stadium (with Bo Petersen / Erik Gundersen / Preben Eriksen) - Winner - 44pts (11)
- 1985 - (United States) Long Beach, Veterans Memorial Stadium (with Bo Petersen / Tommy Knudsen / Erik Gundersen / Preben Eriksen) - Winner - 37pts (10)
- 1986 - (Sweden) Gothenburg, Ullevi, (Denmark) Vojens, Speedway Center and (England) Bradford, Odsal Stadium (with Erik Gundersen / Tommy Knudsen / Jan O. Pedersen / John Jørgensen) - Winner - 129pts (35)
- 1987 - (Denmark) Fredericia, Fredericia Speedway, (England) Coventry, Brandon Stadium and (Czech Republic) Prague, Marketa Stadium (with Erik Gundersen / Jan O. Pedersen / Tommy Knudsen) - Winner - 130pts (38)
- 1988 - (United States) Long Beach, Veterans Memorial Stadium - (with Erik Gundersen / Tommy Knudsen / Jan O. Pedersen / John Jørgensen) - Winner - 44pts (14)
- 1989 - (England) Bradford, Odsal Stadium - (with Erik Gundersen / Gert Handberg / John Jørgensen / Brian Karger) 2nd - 34pts (11)
- 1990 - (Czechoslovakia) Pardubice, Svítkov Stadion - 3rd - 30pts (13)
- 1991 - (Denmark) Vojens, Speedway Center - Winner - 51pts (14)
- 1992 - (Sweden) Kumla, Kumla Speedway - 4th - 17pts (11)
- 1993 - (England) Coventry, Brandon Stadium - 2nd - 38pts (13)
- 1994 - (Germany) Brokstedt, Holsteinring Brokstedt - 3rd - 17+3pts (5)
- 1995 - (Poland) Bydgoszcz, Polonia Bydgoszcz Stadium - Winner - 28pts (13)
- 1997 - (Poland) Piła, Stadion Żużlowy Centrum - Winner - 27pts (14)
- 1998 - (Denmark) Vojens, Speedway Center - 3rd - 23pts (10)

=== Individual Under-21 World Championship ===
- 1978 - (Italy) Lonigo, Santa Marina Stadium - 5th - 11pts

== Speedway Grand Prix results ==
Year	Position	Points	Best Finish	Notes
1995	1st	103	Winner	Won Danish Grand Prix
1996	2nd	111	Winner	Won Italian and German Grand Prix
1997	7th	75	Winner	Won German Grand Prix
1998	4th	76	Winner	Won Danish Grand Prix
1999	3rd	76	Winner	Won Polish II Grand Prix

== World Longtrack Championship ==
- 1979 Semi-final
- 1980 Semi-final
- 1981 Semi-final
- 1982 (Denmark) Esbjerg (9th) 8pts
- 1983 (Czech Republic) Mariánské Lázně (12th) 7pts
- 1984 (Germany) Herxheim (12th) 7pts
- 1985 Semi-final
- 1986 (Germany) Pfarrkirchen (5th) 14pts
- 1987 Semi-final
- 1988 (Germany) Scheeßel (4th) 27pts
- 1989 (Czech Republic) Mariánské Lázně (6th) 20pts
