= Jimmy Nilsen =

Swedish speedway rider

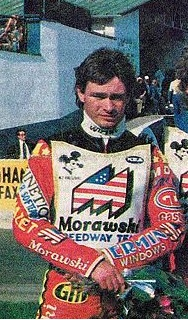
- A portrait of Jimmy Nilsen
- Born: 16 November 1966 (age 60); Sweden
- Nationality: Swedish

Career history

Sweden
- 1982–1995: Getingarna/Stockholm United
- 1996–1998: Rospiggarna
- 1999–2001: Vargarna

Great Britain
- 1985–1990, 1992, 1996–1998: Swindon Robins
- 1991: Berwick Bandits
- 1993–1994: Bradford Dukes
- 1995, 2000: Oxford Cheetahs
- 1999, 2001: Belle Vue Aces

Poland
- 1991–1992: ZKŻ Zielona Góra
- 1994, 1996: Polonia Piła
- 1995: GKM Grudziądz
- 1997–1999: Start Gniezno
- 2000: WTS Wrocław

Individual honours
- 1998: World individual championship runner-up
- 1996: Swedish champion
- 1996: Intercontinental Champion
- 1996: Nordic Champion
- 1984: Swedish U21 champion
- 1990: Jack Young Memorial Cup winner

Team honours
- 1982, 1983, 1985, 1989, 1997: Elitserien Champion
- 1991: Polish Team Championship
- 1991: Inter-Nations Championship
- 1993: British League Knockout Cup

Jimmy Oyvind Nilsen (born 16 November 1966) is a former international motorcycle speedway rider from Sweden. He earned 53 international caps for the Sweden national speedway team.

== Career ==
Nilsen came to prominence in 1984, when he won the Swedish U21 championship and finished second to Per Jonsson at the 1985 European (World) Under-21 Championship final in Abensberg, West Germany. It was in 1985 that he started racing in the British leagues after signing for Swindon Robins for the 1985 British League season.

Nilsen impressed when as a 19-year he finished fourth in the 1986 World Final (his first World Final appearance) at the Silesian Stadium in Katowice, Poland. Nilsen topped the Swindon league averages in 1987 and finished fourth again at the 1987 World Final at the Amsterdam Olympic Stadium in the Netherlands.

In 1988, Nilsen won a bronze medal in the 1988 Speedway World Team Cup and reached the final of the 1988 Speedway World Pairs Championship final and the following season won a silver medal in the World Pairs with Per Jonsson in the 1989 Speedway World Pairs Championship and a bronze medal at the 1989 Speedway World Team Cup.

Nilsen finished fifth in the 1990 Individual Speedway World Championship in Bradford, England (won by Jonsson). Also in 1990 after appearing in a "Rest of the World" team in a test against Australia at the North Arm Speedway in Adelaide, Nilsen won the inaugural running of the Jack Young Memorial Cup, named in honour of Jack Young. At the end of the 1990 season and despite being named rider of the year, Nilsen left Swindon on loan to ride in the Berwick Bandits team for the 1991 season.

Nilsen finished fifth at the 1991 Individual Speedway World Championship final at Ullevi in Gothenburg and won silver medals in the 1991 Speedway World Pairs Championship, with Henrik Gustafsson and the 1991 Speedway World Team Cup. The following season in 1992, Nilsen won another silver medal at the 1992 Speedway World Team Cup and finished seventh in the 1992 Individual Speedway World Championship at the Olympic Stadium in Wrocław, Poland.

Nilsen was Swedish Champion in 1996. Nilsen later qualified for the Speedway Grand Prix in 1997, 1998, 1999, 2000 and 2001, finishing a career best second in 1998 behind countryman Tony Rickardsson.

== World Final Appearances ==
=== Individual World Championship ===
- 1986 – (Poland) Chorzów, Silesian Stadium – 4th – 11pts
- 1987 – (Netherlands) Amsterdam, Olympic Stadium – 4th – 22pts
- 1990 – (England) Bradford, Odsal Stadium – 5th – 10pts
- 1991 – (Sweden) Gothenburg, Ullevi – 5th – 10pts
- 1992 – (Poland) Wrocław, Olympic Stadium – 7th – 7pts

=== World Pairs Championship ===
- 1988 – (England) Bradford, Odsal Stadium (with Per Jonsson) – 5th – 29pts (17)
- 1989 – (Poland) Leszno, Alfred Smoczyk Stadium (with Per Jonsson) – 2nd – 44pts (23)
- 1990 – (West Germany) Landshut, Ellermühle Stadium (with Per Jonsson) – 4th – 33pts (17)
- 1991 – (Poland) Poznań, Olimpia Poznań Stadium (with Henrik Gustafsson / Per Jonsson) – 2nd – 24pts (8)

=== World Team Cup ===
- 1985 – (United States) Long Beach, Veterans Memorial Stadium (with Jan Andersson / Per Jonsson / Tommy Nilsson / Pierre Brannefors) – 4th – 10pts (2)
- 1986 – (Sweden) Göteborg, Ullevi, (Denmark) Vojens, Speedway Center and (England) Bradford, Odsal Stadium (with Jan Andersson / Per Jonsson / Tommy Nilsson / Erik Stenlund / Tony Olsson) – 4th – 73pts (16)
- 1988 – (United States) Long Beach, Veterans Memorial Stadium (with Conny Ivarsson / Henrik Gustafsson / Tony Olsson / Per Jonsson) – 3rd – 22pts (5)
- 1989 – (England) Bradford, Odsal Stadium (with Mikael Blixt / Per Jonsson / Tony Olsson / Erik Stenlund) – 3rd – 30pts (0)
- 1991 – (Denmark) Vojens, Speedway Center – 2nd – 30pts (7)
- 1992 – (Sweden) Kumla, Kumla Speedway – 2nd – 33pts (1)
- 1997 – (Poland) Piła, Stadion Żużlowy Centrum – 3rd – 21pts (3)
- 1998 – (Denmark) Vojens, Speedway Center – 2nd – 24pts (13)

=== World Cup ===
- 2001 – (Poland) Wrocław, Olympic Stadium – 3rd – 51pts (7)

=== Individual Under-21 World Championship ===
- 1985 – (West Germany) Abensberg, Motorstadion – 2nd – 13pts

== Speedway Grand Prix results ==
Year	Position	Points	Best Finish	Notes
1997	8th	71	3rd	Third in British Grand Prix
1998	2nd	99	2nd	Second in German and British Grand Prix
1999	4th	73	2nd	Second in Swedish and Polish Grand Prix
2000	11th	42	5th	
2001	21st	20	7th	
