= 1975 Swedish speedway season =

Motorcycle racing competition

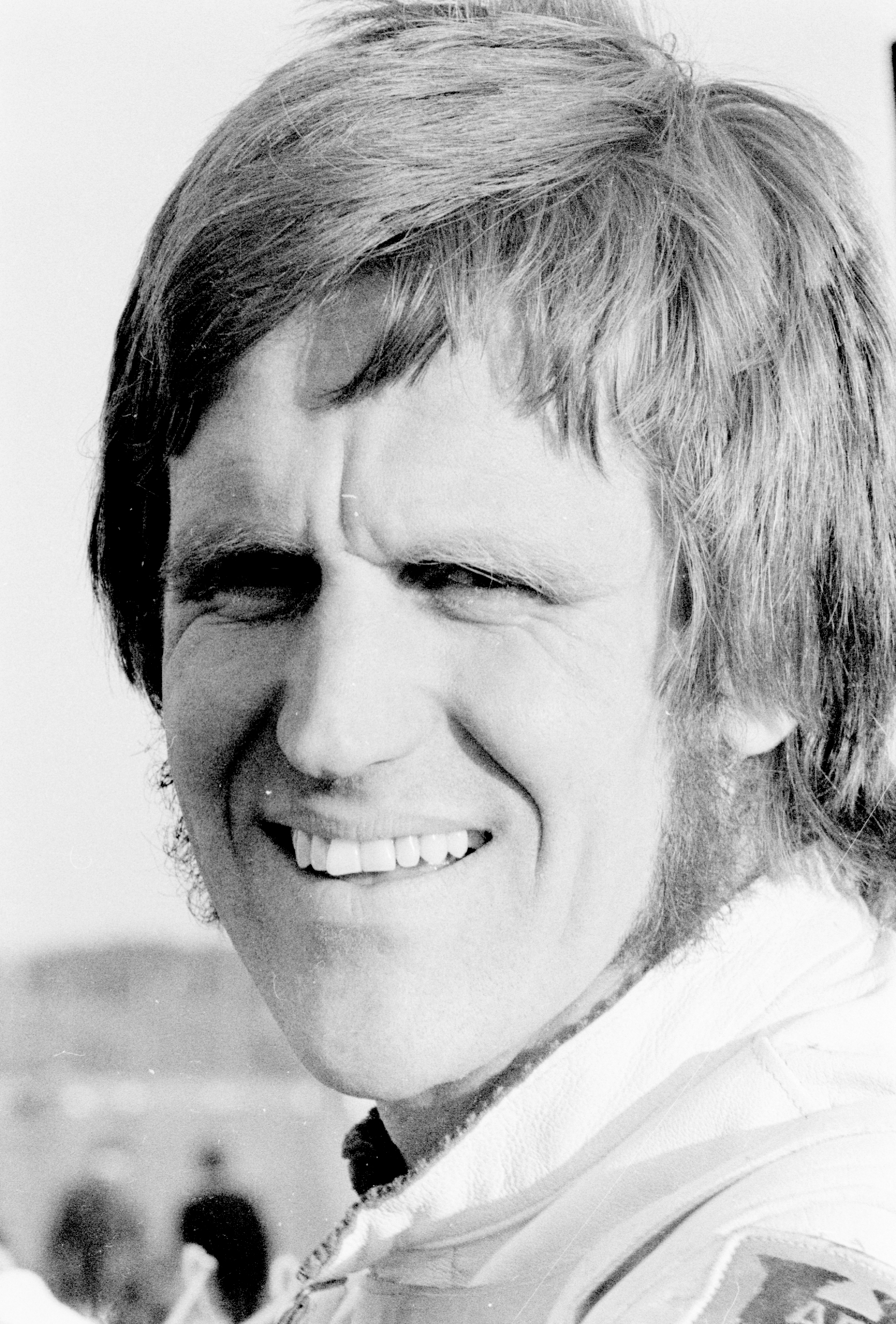
- Hans 'Hasse' Holmqvist finished runner-up in the 1975 individual championship

The 1975 Swedish speedway season was the 1975 season of motorcycle speedway in Sweden.

== Individual ==
=== Individual Championship ===
The 1975 Swedish Individual Speedway Championship final was held on 26 September in Gothenburg. Anders Michanek won the Swedish Championship for the second time.

| Pos. | Rider | Club | Total |
|---|---|---|---|
| 1 | Anders Michanek | Getingarna | 15 |
| 2 | Hans Holmqvist | Indianerna | 13+3 |
| 3 | Tommy Jansson | Smederna | 13+2 |
| 4 | Bernt Persson | Indianerna | 13+1 |
| 5 | Sören Karlsson | Vargarna | 8 |
| 6 | Jan Andersson | Kaparna | 8 |
| 7 | Bengt Jansson | Smederna | 8 |
| 8 | Bo Wirebrand | Njudungarna | 7 |
| 9 | Jan Simensen | Dackarna | 7 |
| 10 | Stefan Salmonsson | Smederna | 6 |
| 11 | Christer Sjösten | Bysarna | 6 |
| 12 | Börje Klingberg | Örnarna | 4 |
| 13 | Per-Åke Gerhardsson | Indianerna | 4 |
| 14 | Karl-Erik Claesson | Örnarna | 4 |
| 15 | Kenneth Selmosson | Kaparna | 3 |
| 16 | Berndt Johansson | Bysarna | 1 |
| 17 | Richard Hellsén (res) | Getingarna | 0 |

=== Junior Championship ===
Winner - Bo Jansson

== Team ==
=== Team Championship ===
Bysarna won division 1 and were declared the winners of the Swedish Speedway Team Championship for the third time. The team included Christer Sjösten, Sören Sjösten and Christer Löfqvist.

Njudungarna won the second division, while Gamarna and Piraterna won the third division north and south respectively.

Div 1
| Pos | Team | Pts |
|---|---|---|
| 1 | Bysarna | 22 |
| 2 | Smederna | 18 |
| 3 | Vargarna | 17 |
| 4 | Indianerna | 16 |
| 5 | Dackarna | 16 |
| 6 | Getingarna | 12 |
| 7 | Lejonen | 7 |
| 8 | Örnarna | 4 |

Div 2
| Pos | Team | Pts |
|---|---|---|
| 1 | Njudungarna | 18 |
| 2 | Filbyterna | 10 |
| 3 | Skepparna | 10 |
| 4 | Kaparna | 8 |
| 5 | Valsarna | 8 |
| 6 | Masarna | 6 |

Div 3 north
| Pos | Team | Pts |
|---|---|---|
| 1 | Gamarna | 22 |
| 2 | Jämtarna | 16 |
| 3 | Eldarna | 12 |
| 4 | Lindarna | 9 |
| 5 | Stjärnorna | 1 |

Div 3 south
| Pos | Team | Pts |
|---|---|---|
| 1 | Piraterna | 22 |
| 2 | Vikingarna | 15 |
| 3 | Solkatterna | 13 |
| 4 | Hjälmarna | 8 |
| 5 | Pilarna | 2 |

== See also ==
- Speedway in Sweden
