= 1971 Swedish speedway season =

Motorcycle racing competition

The 1971 Swedish speedway season was the 1971 season of motorcycle speedway in Sweden.

== Individual ==
=== Individual Championship ===
The 1971 Swedish Individual Speedway Championship final was held on 2 October in Stockholm. Göte Nordin won the Swedish Championship for the second time. The final ended in controversy because Anders Michanek refused to pariticpate in a re-run and was disqualified. Michanek and Göte Nordin both finished on 14 points and in the race off Michanek beat Nordin after the latter pulled out of the race, claiming that he saw a red light to stop the race. The match referee ordered a re-run but Michanek refused to take part claiming there was no red light. The incident resulted in violence between rival supporters and was headline news in Sweden.

Pos.	Rider	Club	Total
1	Göte Nordin	Kaparna	14+3
2	Anders Michanek	Getingarna	14+2
3	Leif Enecrona	Getingarna	12+3
4	Hans Holmqvist	Vargarna	12+2
5	Lars Jansson	Getingarna	11
6	Tommy Johansson	Bysarna	11
7	Jan Simensen	Lejonen	8
8	Bengt Jansson	Kaparna	8
9	Christer Löfqvist	Bysarna	7
10	Bernt Persson	Indianerna	6
11	Sören Sjösten	Bysarna	5
12	Bengt Larsson	Örnarna	4
13	Sven-Inge Svensson	Njudungarna	3
14	Tommy Jansson	Smederna	3
15	Lars-Åke Andersson	Njudungarna	2
16	Runo Wedin	Vargarna	0
17	Ove Fundin	Kaparna	dns

=== Junior Championship ===
Winner - Lars Inge Hultberg

== Team ==
=== Team Championship ===
Bysarna won division 1 and were declared the winners of the Swedish Speedway Team Championship for the first time. The Bysarna team included Sören Sjösten, Tommy Johansson and Christer Löfqvist.

Dackarna and Smederna won the second division east and west respectively, while Valsarna won the third division.

Div 1
Pos	Team	Pts
1	Bysarna	20
2	Lejonen	13
3	Örnarna	12
4	Vargarna	12
5	Getingarna	10
6	Njudungarna	9
7	Kaparna	8

Div 2 east
Pos	Team	Pts
1	Dackarna	20.5
2	Skepparna	14
3	Filbyterna	14
4	Eldarna	10.5
5	Gamarna	1

Div 2 west
Pos	Team	Pts
1	Smederna	22
2	Indianerna	20
3	Lindarna	7
4	Masarna	6
5	Vikingarna	5

Div 3
Pos	Team	Pts
1	Valsarna	24
2	Solkatterna	16
3	Piraterna	11
4	Stjärnorna	7
5	Jämtarna	2

== See also ==
- Speedway in Sweden
