= 1972 Swedish speedway season =

Motorcycle racing competition

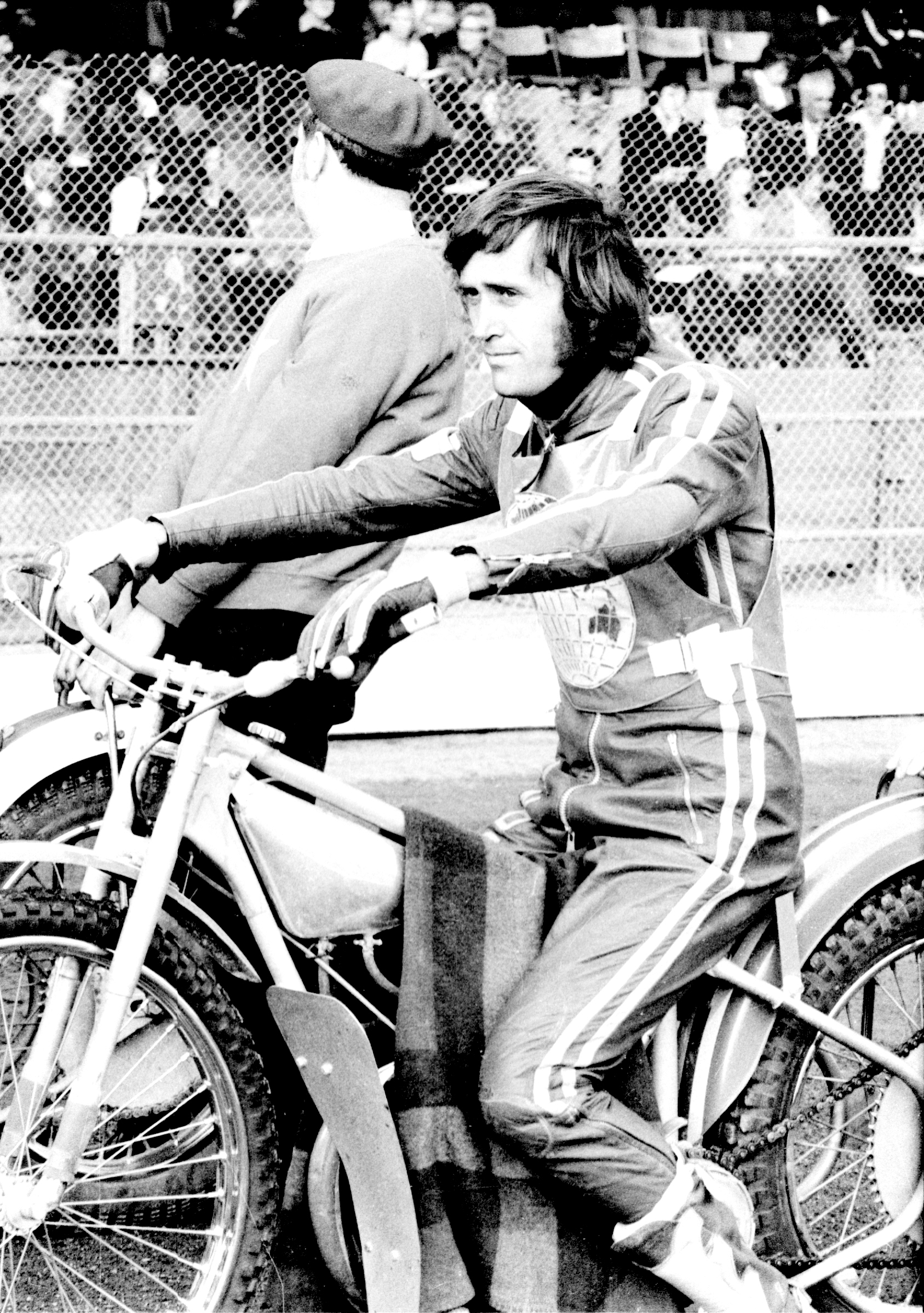
- Anders Michanek; 1972 Swedish champion

The 1972 Swedish speedway season was the 1972 season of motorcycle speedway in Sweden.

== Individual ==
=== Individual Championship ===
The 1972 Swedish Individual Speedway Championship final was held on 29 September in Borås. Anders Michanek won the Swedish Championship.

Pos.	Rider	Club	Total
1	Anders Michanek	Getingarna	15
2	Bengt Jansson	Kaparna	13
3	Bernt Persson	Indianerna	12+3
4	Tommy Jansson	Smederna	12+2
5	Hans Holmqvist	Vargarna	11
6	Christer Löfqvist	Bysarna	9
7	Leif Enecrona	Getingarna	9
8	Bo Wirebrand	Njudungarna	8
9	Christer Sjösten	Smederna	8
10	Tommy Johansson	Dackarna	7
11	Jan Simensen	Lejonen	7
12	Bo Magnusson	Kaparna	5
13	Bo Josefsson	Lejonen	3
14	Berndt Johansson	Bysarna	3
15	Lars Jansson	Getingarna	2
16	Per-Olof Söderman	Vargarna	0
17	Göte Nordin	Smederna	dns

=== Junior Championship ===
Winner - Tommy Pettersson

== Team ==
=== Team Championship ===
Bysarna won division 1 and were declared the winners of the Swedish Speedway Team Championship for the second successive year. The Bysarna team included Sören Sjösten and Christer Löfqvist.

Dackarna and Indianerna won the second division east and west respectively, while Gamarna won the third division.

Div 1
Pos	Team	Pts
1	Bysarna	20
2	Lejonen	15
3	Smederna	15
4	Getingarna	10
5	Njudungarna	8
6	Örnarna	8
7	Vargarna	8

Div 2 east
Pos	Team	Pts
1	Dackarna	21
2	Kaparna	20.5
3	Skepparna	10
4	Filbyterna	5.5
5	Eldarna	3

Div 2 west
Pos	Team	Pts
1	Indianerna	22.5
2	Masarna	13
3	Vikingarna	10.5
4	Lindarna	7.5
5	Valsarna	6.5

Div 3
Pos	Team	Pts
1	Gamarna	20
2	Stjärnorna	18
3	Piraterna	8.5
4	Jämtarna	7
5	Solkatterna	6.5

== See also ==
- Speedway in Sweden
