= Visby (disambiguation) =

Visby is the largest city on the Swedish island of Gotland.

Visby may also refer to:

== Ships ==
- Visby-class destroyer, a Swedish World War II destroyer class
  - HSwMS Visby (J11), a Swedish Navy destroyer of the class
- Visby-class corvette, a class of corvette of the Swedish Navy
  - HSwMS Visby (K31), lead ship of the class, launched in 2000

== Places ==
- Visby Airport, airport north of Visby, Gotland, Sweden
- Norra Visby, a locality situated in Gotland, Sweden

== Sport teams ==
- Visby AIK, a Swedish football club
- IFK Visby, a Swedish football club
- Visby BBK, a Swedish women's basketball club
- FC Gute (formerly Visby IF Gute), a Swedish football club

== Other uses ==
- Battle of Visby, fought in 1361 near the town of Visby
- Diocese of Visby, a division of the Church of Sweden
