= Bysarna =

Swedish speedway team

Club information
- Track address: Gamla Speedway Track; Galgberget, Visby, Gotland
- Country: Sweden
- Founded: 1967
- Closed: 2007

Major team honours
League champions	1971, 1972, 1975, 1988
second division winners	1970, 1985, 2000
third division winners	1969

Bysarna were a Swedish motorcycle speedway team based at the Gamla Speedway Track, in Galgberget, north of Visby on the island of Gotland in Sweden. They were four times league champions of Sweden.

== History ==
=== 1921 to 1951 ===
The beginning of speedway in Visby can be traced back to November 1921 when the Gotland Motor Association was formed. Eight years later in 1929 the Gotland Motorcycle Club were riding dirt track races. A meeting was held at Gutavallen on 23 October and several other meetings took place at various venues before the war. After the war a suitable piece of land was acquired in Galgberget and the track was completed in 1951.

=== 1967 to 1977 ===
Although a track existed in Visby there was no team until 1967, when a team called Bysarna entered Division 3 east, during the 1967 Swedish speedway season. The team finished second in the division behind Dackarna. Two years in 1969 later Bysarna won their first trophy after finishing top of the same division and winning a promotion play-off final. The team competed in the second division in 1970 and duly completed a quick double by winning the division.

The team made their debut in the first division (commonly known as the Allsvenskan at the time) and achieved a remarkable feat by winning the gold medal during the 1971 Swedish speedway season and thus becoming the Swedish Speedway Team Champions. The team then retained their title the following season in 1972.

The success continued finishing second in 1973 and then winning their third gold medal during the 1975 Swedish speedway season. Some of Bysarna's leading riders from the period included Christer Löfqvist, Tommy Johansson and Sören Sjösten and Berndt Johansson. The golden period came to an end in 1977 when the club were relegated.

=== 1978 to 1999 ===
The club remained in the second tier, which became known as the Division 1 because of the introduction of the Elitserien in 1982. However, in 1985, they won division 1 and were promoted to the Elitserien. In 1988, the team won their fourth gold medal led by riders such as Per Jonsson, Tony Olsson, Dennis Löfqvist and Brian Karger. The team continued to compete in the Elitserien until relegation in 1999.

=== 2000 to 2007 ===
The new millennium started well when the club won the Allsvenskan (second tier) and returned to the Elitserien for one final season in 2001. Unfortunately they were relegated back to the Allsvenskan in 2002 and struggled over the following years opting for the third tier in 2006.

In 2007, the club's track at Galgberget was closed down and the team raced their last season despite efforts to find a new track.

== Notable riders ==
- (United States) Ronnie Correy
- (Sweden) Berndt Johansson
- (Sweden) Tommy Johansson
- (Sweden) Per Jonsson
- (Denmark) Brian Karger
- (Sweden) Christer Löfqvist
- (Sweden) Dennis Löfqvist
- (England) Mark Loram
- (England) Chris Louis
- (Sweden) Tony Olsson
- (Sweden) Sören Sjösten
