= Visby =

Place in Gotland, Sweden

- Locality
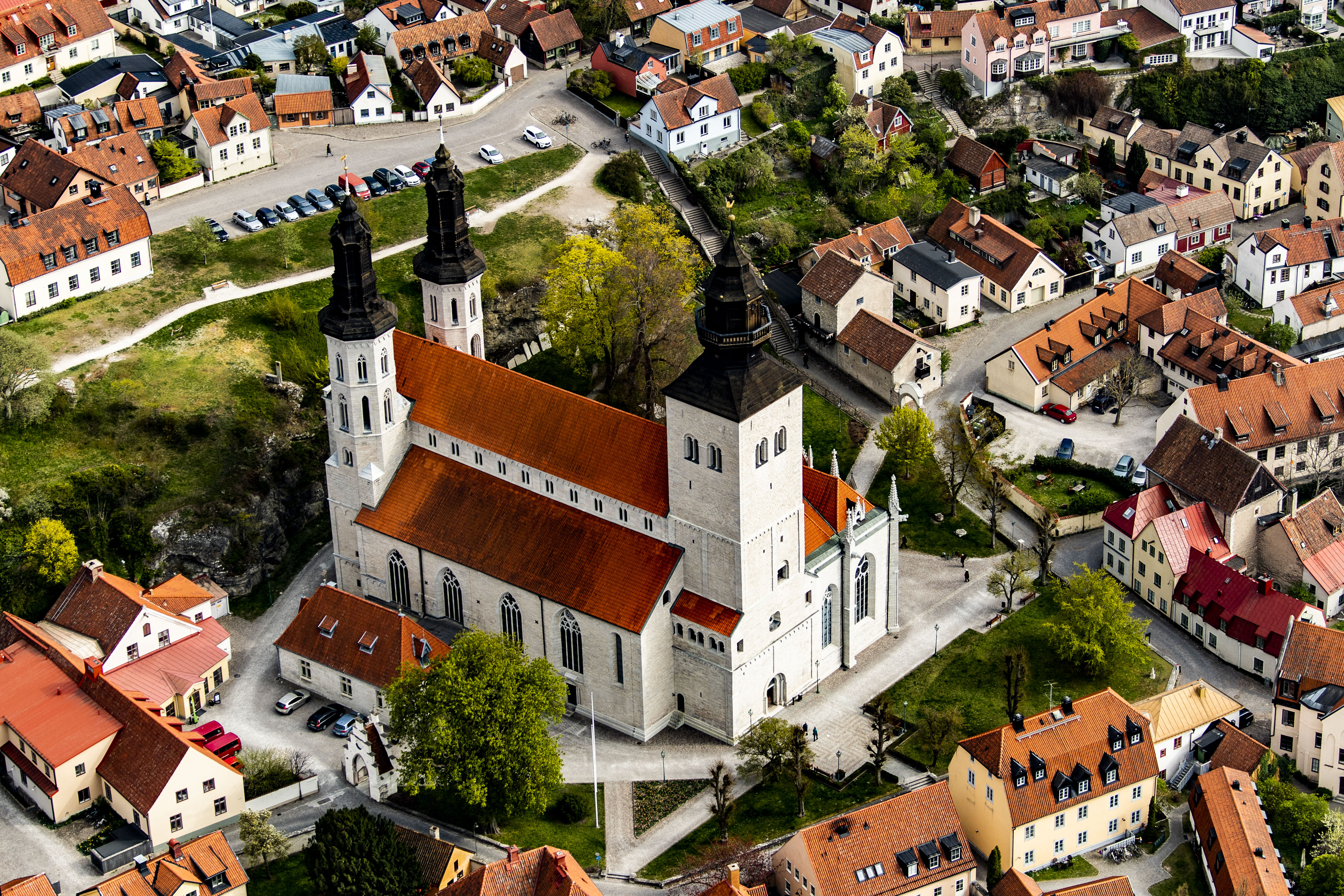
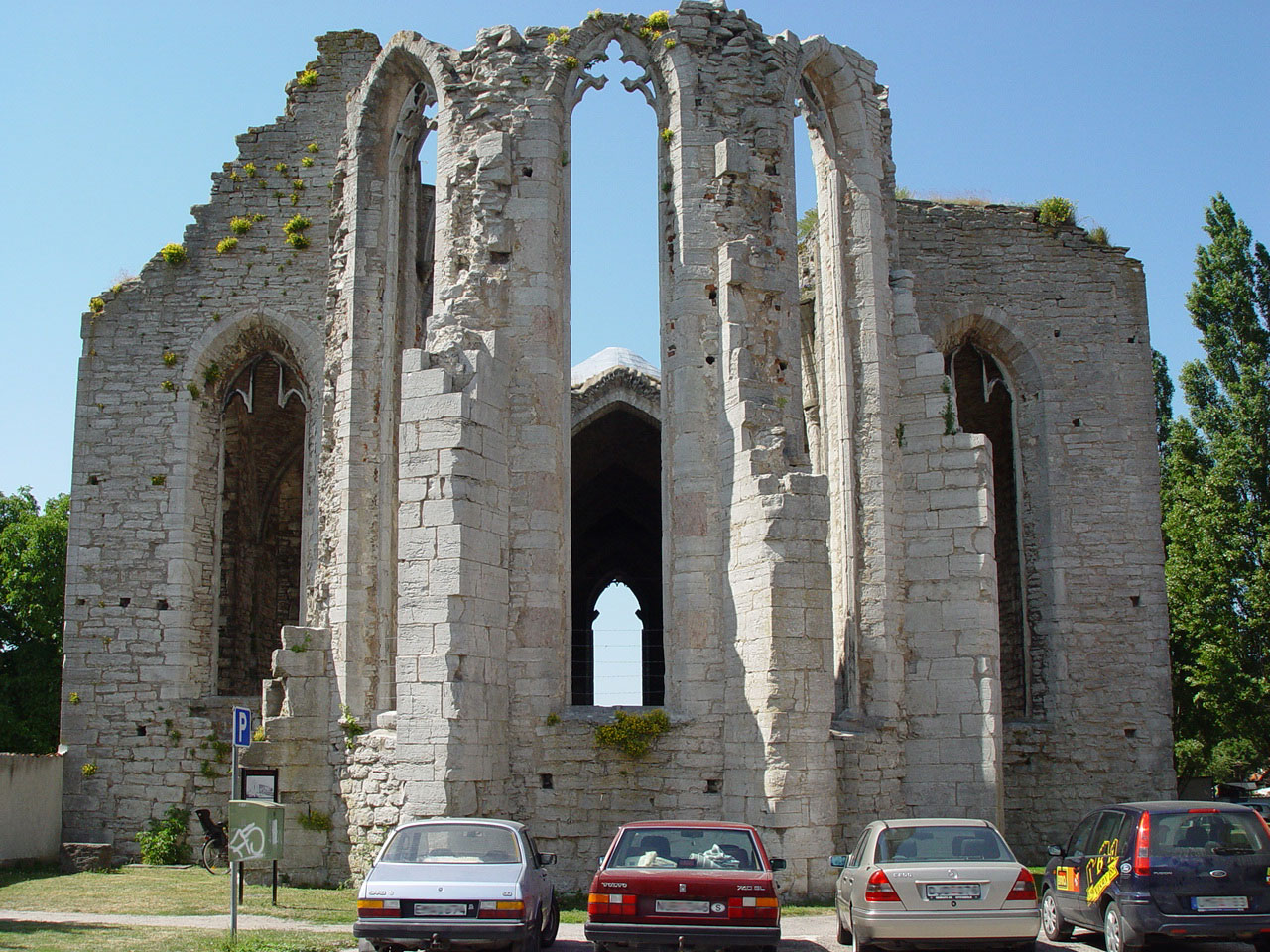
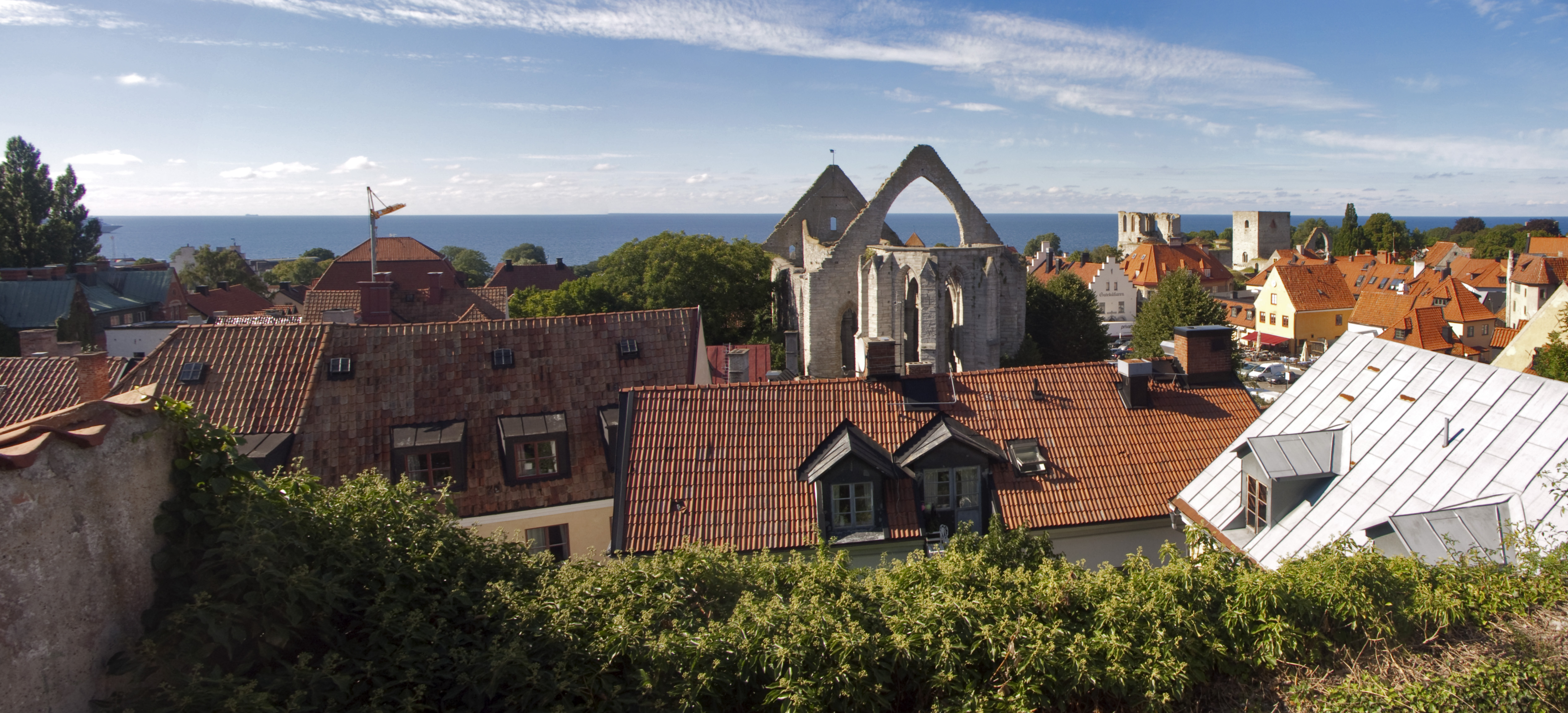
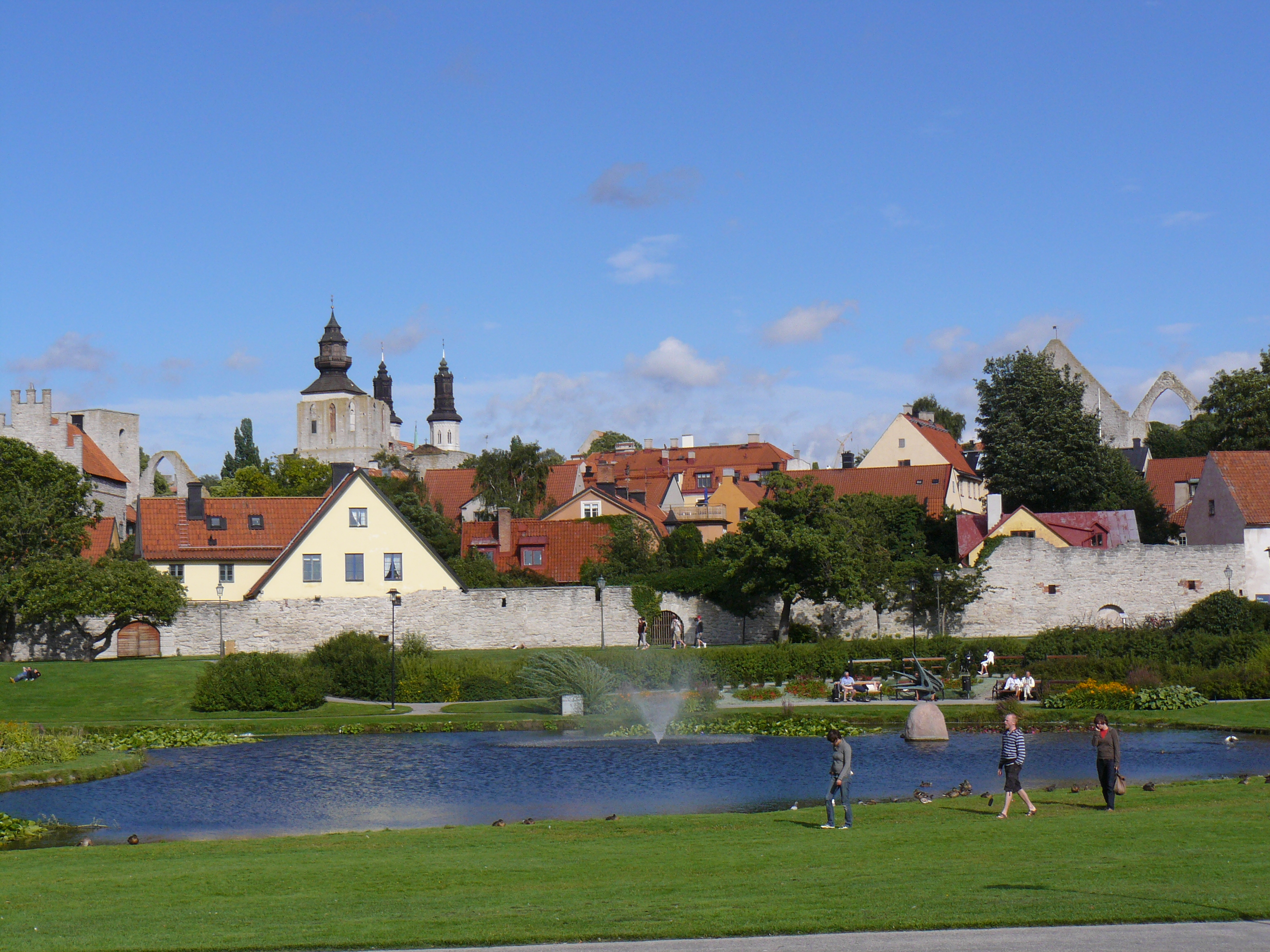
- Clockwise from top: the Visby Cathedral; ruins of the Saint Nicolai Church; Almedalen

- Coat of arms
- Nicknames: Rosornas stad (Swedish); The City of Roses (English)
- Location within Gotland Location within Sweden
- Coordinates: 57°38′05″N 18°17′57″E
- Country: Sweden
- Province: Gotland
- County: Gotland County
- Municipality: Gotland Municipality
- Charter: 1645

Area
  - Locality: 12.44 km^{2} (4.80 sq mi)

Population (31 December 2017)
  - Locality: 24,330
  - Density: 1,816/km^{2} (4,700/sq mi)
  - Metro: 58,003
- Time zone: UTC+1 (CET)
  - Summer (DST): UTC+2 (CEST)
- Postal code: 621 xx
- Area code: (+46) 498
- Website: www.visby.se

UNESCO World Heritage Site
- Official name: Hanseatic Town of Visby
- Criteria: Cultural: iv, v
- Reference: 731
- Inscription: 1995 (19th Session)

Visby (Swedish: [ˈvǐːsbʏ]) is an urban area in Sweden and the seat of Gotland Municipality in Gotland County on the island of Gotland with 24,330 inhabitants as of 2017. Visby is also the episcopal see for the Diocese of Visby. The Hanseatic city of Visby is one of the best-preserved medieval cities in Scandinavia, and, since 1995, it has been on the UNESCO World Heritage Site list. Among the most notable historical remains are the 3.4 km (2.1 mi) long town wall that encircles the town center, and a number of church ruins and its small decorative alleyways. The decline as a Hanseatic city in the Late Middle Ages was the cause for many stone houses being preserved in their original medieval style.

Visby is a popular vacation destination for Scandinavians during the summer and receives thousands of tourists every year. It is by far the most populous Swedish locality outside the Swedish mainland. The Gotland University is in Visby, and since 1 July 2013, it is a department of Uppsala University under the name Uppsala University–Campus Gotland. Visby is also the sole county seat in Sweden accessible from the mainland only by boat and air.

Important annual events held in Visby include the annual political forum Almedalen Week.

== Etymology ==
The name "Visby" comes from the Old Norse Vis, (genitive singular of Vi) meaning "(pagan) place of sacrifices", and by, meaning "village". In the Gutasagan (mid 14th century) the place is referred to as just Wi meaning "holy place, place of worship".

Visby is sometimes called "The City of Roses" or "The City of Ruins".

== History ==
The earliest history of Visby is uncertain, but it is known to have been a centre of merchandise around AD 900. It was inhabited as early as the Stone Age, probably because of the access to fresh water and a natural harbour. The oldest finds at the site of present-day Visby are what have been interpreted as "beach huts", with the radiocarbon dating method to the 7th–9th centuries AD.

In the 12th century, Visby Cathedral, dedicated to Saint Mary, was constructed. It was reshaped in the 13th century to its current appearance, and was officially opened in 1225, by the bishop of the Swedish city of Linköping (in regional map). Several other churches were also constructed in the ensuing centuries. The city flourished, thanks to the German Hanseatic League.

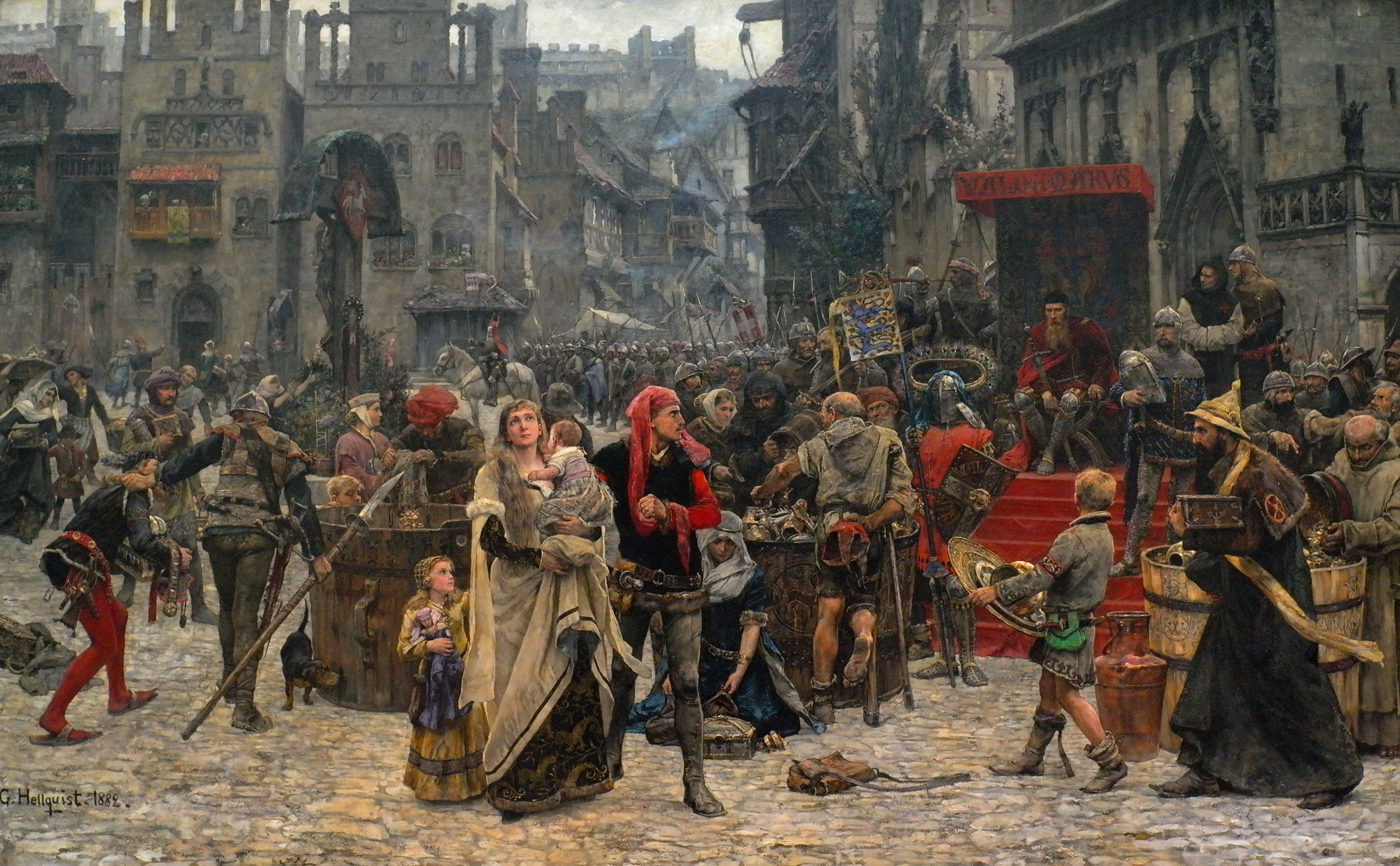
Valdemar Atterdag holding Visby to ransom, 1361, by Carl Gustaf Hellqvist (1851–1890).

The work on the ring wall was likely begun in the 12th century. Around 1300, it was rebuilt to reach its current height, acquiring the characteristic towers, although some towers were not constructed until the 15th century. The ringwall is still largely intact.

In the first half of the 14th century (1300–1350), Visby was at the height of its wealth and influence, and it was during this time that Laws of Wisbuy, a set of maritime laws that had broad influence in the Baltic and beyond, were probably promulgated.

In 1361, Gotland was conquered by Valdemar IV of Denmark. 1,800 Gotlanders were killed in battle in front of the city. Valdemar added "King of Gotland" to his title list. His treatment of Visby, a member of the Hanseatic League, precipitated that League into war with Denmark; however, though Valdemar was forced into various concessions, he retained Visby as a Danish city.

In 1391, 1394 and 1398, it was taken and plundered by the Victual Brothers, pirates who sailed the Baltic Sea. An invading army of Teutonic Knights conquered Gotland in 1398, destroyed Visby and expelled the Victual Brothers. In 1409, Grand Master Ulrich von Jungingen of the Teutonic Knights guaranteed peace with the Kalmar Union of Scandinavia by selling the island of Gotland to Queen Margaret of Denmark, Norway and Sweden.

In 1411, the Norwegian, Danish and Swedish King Eric of Pomerania had the castle of Visborg constructed, and settled himself there for 12 years, during which the city virtually became a pirates' nest, and the commerce halted. As of 1470, the Hanseatic League rescinded Visby's status as a Hanseatic town.

In 1525, the final blow came. In the Danish throne quarrel, Lübeck, a Free City of the Holy Roman Empire and a leading member of the Hanseatic League, supported Frederick I, while Søren Norby the Danish governor of Gotland fought for Christian II, even after Christian's official resignation in 1523. While Norby fought a military action in Sweden, the Lübeckers successfully attacked Visby and set the city on fire from four sites. But unlike widespread belief, several churches survived at first. The churches of St. James (which already had been closed before), St. Nicholas and St. Gertrude were sacked by Lübeck's army. With the reformation, all churches except St. John, which became the city parish, were closed. In 1528, the citizens of Visby sacked the church of the Holy Trinity, or the church of Our Lord (Swedish: Drottens kyrka) in revenge for the plundering of their town. In 1533–34, the new Danish governor, Henrik Nielsen Rosenkrantz, demolished St. John's and St. Peter's churches to improve the defence of his castle Visborgs slott. St. Mary's Cathedral remained the last functional church and became the new city parish.

Gotland was again taken into Sweden's possession in 1645, by the Treaty of Brömsebro, after 300 years of Danish rule. The city developed slowly as things were left as they were. In the mid 18th century, after a plague had reduced Visby's population, some attempts were made by Swedish government officials to improve living standards, but little was accomplished. Not until the early 19th century did Visby once again attract commerce and a harbour industry. At the same time – 1808 – Gotland was conquered by Russia, but was peacefully taken back by the Swedes after only a couple of months.

== Geography ==
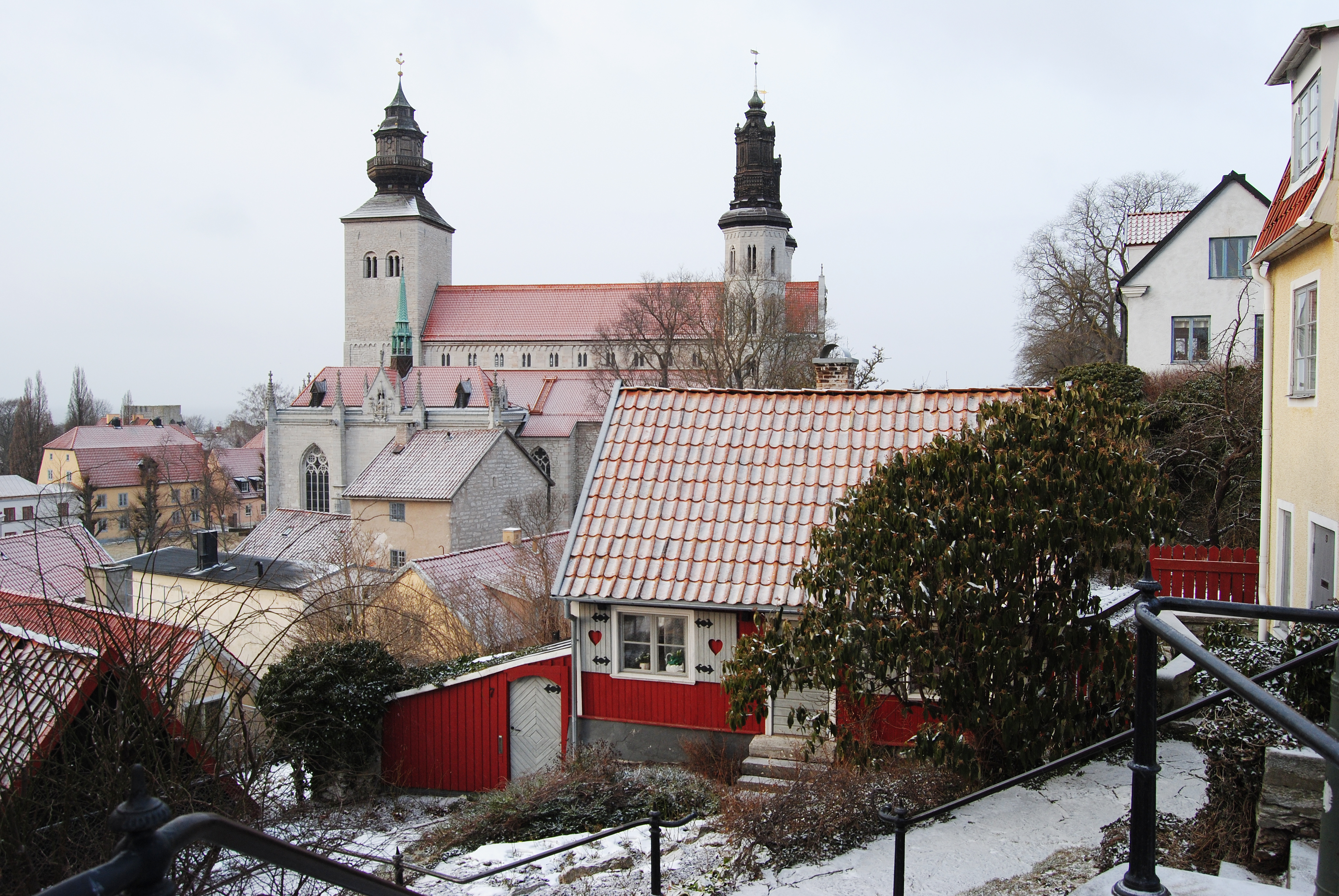
General view towards the cathedral from Övre Finngränd on Klinten

Visby is the name of the locality, or town, as well as the name of the larger area surrounding it, Visby socken. In 1936, the socken was incorporated within the newly formed Visby stad (Visby city), the only locality with historical city status on Gotland. Visby socken comprises the same area as the administrative Visby District, established on 1 January 2016. As of 2019, Visby Cathedral, Visborg Church and Terra Nova Church in Visby belong to Visby Cathedral parish (Visby Domkyrkoförsamling). Visby is also the only municipality seat of Sweden that is accessible from the mainland only by boat and air traffic.

Visby is situated on the central west coast of Gotland, on the rather steep slopes of limestone cliffs surrounding the first natural harbor. The town has evolved around the medieval harbor that now constitutes the Almedalen park. Long streets run parallel with the old shoreline with shorter alleys at a straight angle from these, lead from the harbor and up the slope up to the eastern higher part of town known as Klinten.

The old, original part of Visby is more or less enclosed by the city wall to the north, east and south, with the old harbor and the Baltic Sea in the west. The more modern parts of the town expand mostly east and inland from the wall. Along the shore south of the wall is the modern harbor with its ferry terminals and further south is a green recreational area called Södra Hällarna. Just inside the north part of the wall as well as along the north coast outside the wall, are several beaches: Kallbadhuset, Norderstrand, Snäckgärdsbaden (or simply Snäck) and Gustavsvik.

Visby and Tallinn are the only two North-European towns in which the city's medieval grid plan has been fully preserved into present day.

One of the asteroids in the asteroid belt, 6102 Visby, is named after this place.

== Climate ==
According to the Köppen climate classification, Visby has an oceanic climate (Cfb). This renders the summers cooler and the winters milder than in most of mainland Sweden. However, in spite of its maritime location the city's climate is very much influenced by continental airflows. Precipitation amounts are quite moderate, especially for an oceanic climate, and relatively consistent throughout the year. Visby is one of the sunniest towns in Sweden and in the Nordic countries, especially so during summer.

Climate data for Visby Airport 1991–2020 monthly normals and extremes
Month	Jan	Feb	Mar	Apr	May	Jun	Jul	Aug	Sep	Oct	Nov	Dec	Year
Record high °C (°F)	10.2 (50.4)	11.2 (52.2)	16.1 (61.0)	25.2 (77.4)	27.7 (81.9)	31.2 (88.2)	33.7 (92.7)	32.9 (91.2)	28.1 (82.6)	20.9 (69.6)	14.9 (58.8)	12.5 (54.5)	33.7 (92.7)
Mean maximum °C (°F)	6.6 (43.9)	6.8 (44.2)	11.2 (52.2)	18.5 (65.3)	23.4 (74.1)	25.8 (78.4)	27.8 (82.0)	27.0 (80.6)	22.3 (72.1)	16.0 (60.8)	10.7 (51.3)	7.8 (46.0)	28.9 (84.0)
Mean daily maximum °C (°F)	2.0 (35.6)	1.8 (35.2)	4.4 (39.9)	9.8 (49.6)	15.0 (59.0)	18.9 (66.0)	21.6 (70.9)	21.1 (70.0)	16.6 (61.9)	10.9 (51.6)	6.3 (43.3)	3.5 (38.3)	11.0 (51.8)
Daily mean °C (°F)	0.2 (32.4)	−0.3 (31.5)	1.3 (34.3)	5.4 (41.7)	10.2 (50.4)	14.5 (58.1)	17.4 (63.3)	17.1 (62.8)	13.0 (55.4)	8.3 (46.9)	4.5 (40.1)	1.8 (35.2)	7.8 (46.0)
Mean daily minimum °C (°F)	−1.9 (28.6)	−2.6 (27.3)	−1.8 (28.8)	1.2 (34.2)	5.3 (41.5)	10.0 (50.0)	13.2 (55.8)	13.2 (55.8)	9.6 (49.3)	5.6 (42.1)	2.5 (36.5)	−0.3 (31.5)	4.5 (40.1)
Mean minimum °C (°F)	−11.5 (11.3)	−10.9 (12.4)	−9.9 (14.2)	−5.3 (22.5)	−1.4 (29.5)	3.8 (38.8)	7.4 (45.3)	6.8 (44.2)	2.7 (36.9)	−2.0 (28.4)	−4.3 (24.3)	−8.3 (17.1)	−14.2 (6.4)
Record low °C (°F)	−20.1 (−4.2)	−21.2 (−6.2)	−19.5 (−3.1)	−8.7 (16.3)	−7.8 (18.0)	−0.3 (31.5)	4.1 (39.4)	4.3 (39.7)	−2.9 (26.8)	−6.0 (21.2)	−15.4 (4.3)	−22.2 (−8.0)	−22.2 (−8.0)
Average precipitation mm (inches)	42.7 (1.68)	35.3 (1.39)	27.6 (1.09)	24.9 (0.98)	29.0 (1.14)	42.5 (1.67)	61.3 (2.41)	56.6 (2.23)	47.5 (1.87)	54.0 (2.13)	55.5 (2.19)	56.2 (2.21)	533.2 (20.99)
Mean monthly sunshine hours	41	70	156	243	317	315	314	261	188	102	42	31	2,080
Source 1:
Source 2:

Climate data for Visby Airport (2002–2020 averages, extremes since 1901)
Month	Jan	Feb	Mar	Apr	May	Jun	Jul	Aug	Sep	Oct	Nov	Dec	Year
Record high °C (°F)	10.2 (50.4)	12.9 (55.2)	18.6 (65.5)	25.2 (77.4)	27.7 (81.9)	31.4 (88.5)	33.7 (92.7)	32.9 (91.2)	29.5 (85.1)	20.9 (69.6)	14.9 (58.8)	12.5 (54.5)	33.7 (92.7)
Mean maximum °C (°F)	6.8 (44.2)	6.8 (44.2)	11.7 (53.1)	18.2 (64.8)	23.8 (74.8)	26.2 (79.2)	28.1 (82.6)	27.5 (81.5)	23.1 (73.6)	16.3 (61.3)	11.2 (52.2)	8.1 (46.6)	29.2 (84.6)
Mean daily maximum °C (°F)	1.8 (35.2)	1.8 (35.2)	4.6 (40.3)	10.2 (50.4)	15.6 (60.1)	19.4 (66.9)	21.9 (71.4)	21.5 (70.7)	17.1 (62.8)	11.0 (51.8)	6.9 (44.4)	3.9 (39.0)	11.3 (52.4)
Daily mean °C (°F)	−0.3 (31.5)	−0.5 (31.1)	1.3 (34.3)	5.2 (41.4)	10.6 (51.1)	14.8 (58.6)	17.7 (63.9)	17.4 (63.3)	13.6 (56.5)	8.3 (46.9)	4.9 (40.8)	2.0 (35.6)	7.9 (46.3)
Mean daily minimum °C (°F)	−2.4 (27.7)	−2.7 (27.1)	−2.1 (28.2)	1.1 (34.0)	5.5 (41.9)	10.2 (50.4)	13.4 (56.1)	13.3 (55.9)	10.0 (50.0)	5.5 (41.9)	2.9 (37.2)	0.1 (32.2)	4.6 (40.2)
Mean minimum °C (°F)	−12.7 (9.1)	−11.0 (12.2)	−10.9 (12.4)	−5.9 (21.4)	−1.7 (28.9)	3.1 (37.6)	7.6 (45.7)	6.5 (43.7)	3.3 (37.9)	−2.2 (28.0)	−3.8 (25.2)	−7.8 (18.0)	−14.6 (5.7)
Record low °C (°F)	−25.0 (−13.0)	−25.4 (−13.7)	−23.5 (−10.3)	−12.7 (9.1)	−7.8 (18.0)	−1.0 (30.2)	2.9 (37.2)	1.1 (34.0)	−2.9 (26.8)	−6.0 (21.2)	−15.4 (4.3)	−22.2 (−8.0)	−25.4 (−13.7)
Average precipitation mm (inches)	46.5 (1.83)	32.0 (1.26)	27.9 (1.10)	20.2 (0.80)	28.2 (1.11)	39.8 (1.57)	64.8 (2.55)	58.6 (2.31)	40.1 (1.58)	57.4 (2.26)	60.9 (2.40)	57.8 (2.28)	534.2 (21.05)
Average extreme snow depth cm (inches)	15 (5.9)	13 (5.1)	8 (3.1)	1 (0.4)	0 (0)	0 (0)	0 (0)	0 (0)	0 (0)	0 (0)	5 (2.0)	7 (2.8)	21 (8.3)
Mean monthly sunshine hours	37	70	167	261	322	331	313	265	200	103	42	31	2,142
Percentage possible sunshine	17	25	45	59	60	60	58	56	53	33	17	15	42
Source 1:
Source 2:

== Infrastructure ==
=== Transport ===
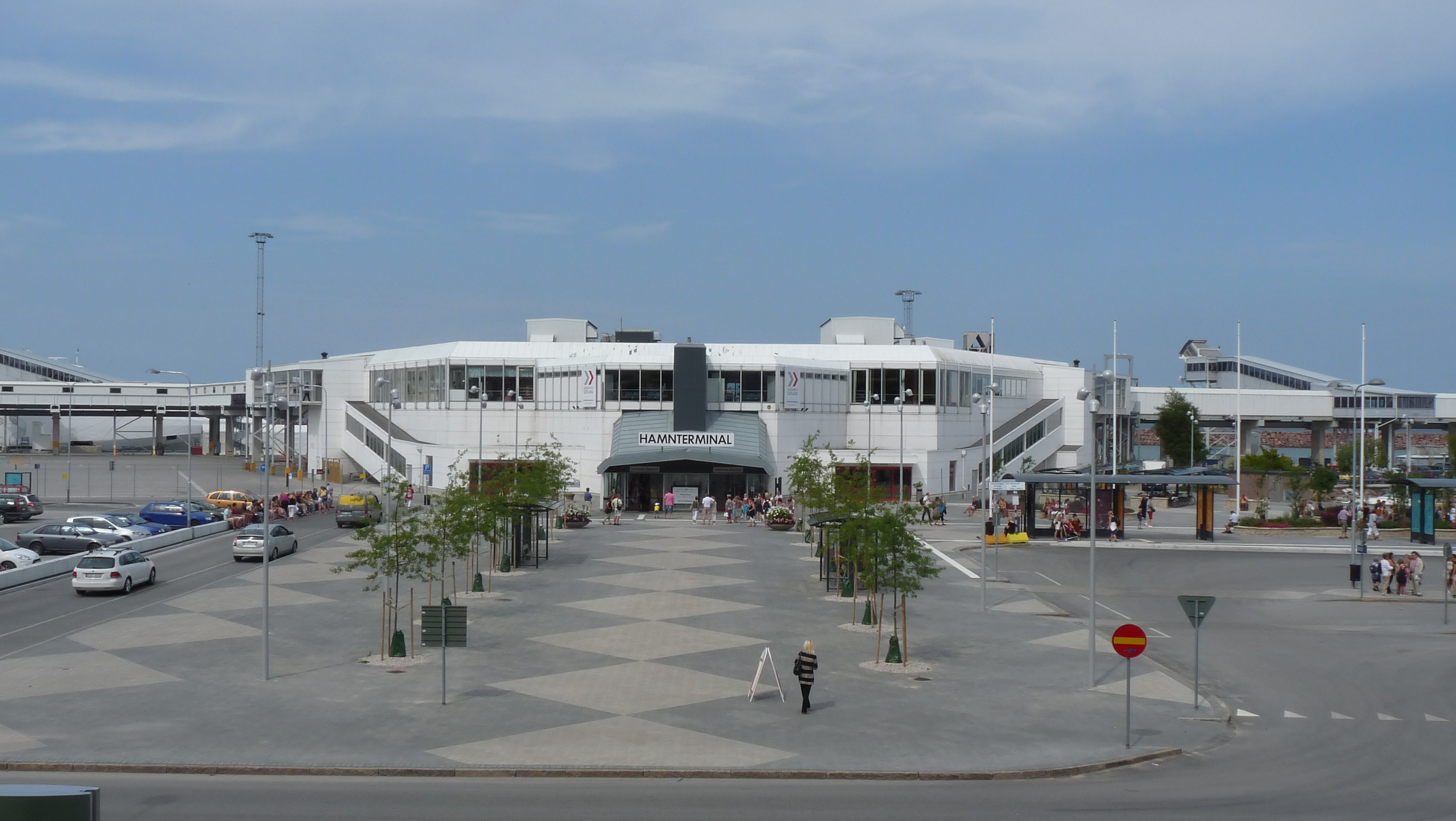
The ferry terminal in the harbour

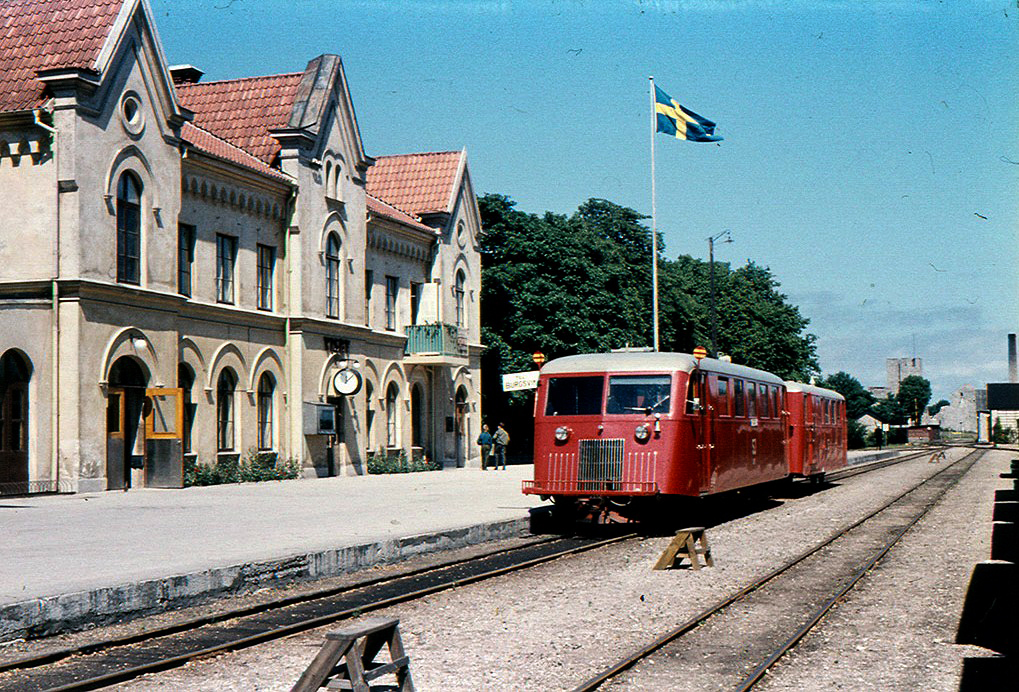
Train at Visby railway station during the last year of traffic, 1960

Visby is linked to the mainland of Sweden by ferry and by plane. Ferries arrive from both Oskarshamn in Småland and Nynäshamn, near Stockholm, each taking about three hours. The ferries are run by Destination Gotland and subsidized by the Swedish government. Destination Gotland is the only ferry operator – in summer 2016, independent shipping company Gotlandsbåten ran ferries to Västervik and Nynäshamn, but this service was unprofitable and was not repeated in 2017.

Visby Airport is located about 5 km (3.1 mi) north of the city and offers connections to the Swedish mainland. With 467,857 passengers in 2018, it is the 9th largest airport in Sweden. Daily flights to Stockholm Arlanda Airport is a common way to reach or depart from the island.

There are also city buses in Visby as well as buses to other parts of Gotland.

Visby gave its name to the 1968 Visby Amendments, which were an amendment of the Hague Rules of shipping law, leading to the Hague–Visby Rules.

Visby was previously served by two railway lines, the Gotland Railway which ran from Lärbro in the north, to Burgsvik in the south, via Visby harbour and the Visby–Visborgsslätt–Bjärs Railway, south to Visborgsslätt and Västerhejde. The first line, from Visby to Hemse was started in 1878, under the auspices of the Gotland Railway. Passenger transport was discontinued in September 1960. Freight traffic on the Slakteriet – Visby port route ran until May 1962. The last sections of the port track in Visby were removed in March 1964. Visby railway station, just south of the Söderport on Söderväg, was completed in 1878 and is one of the few remaining vestiges of the railway in Visby.

=== Utilities ===
Near Visby, there is the static inverter plant for the first HVDC interconnection of a windpark (HVDC Visby–Näs).

== Sights and events ==
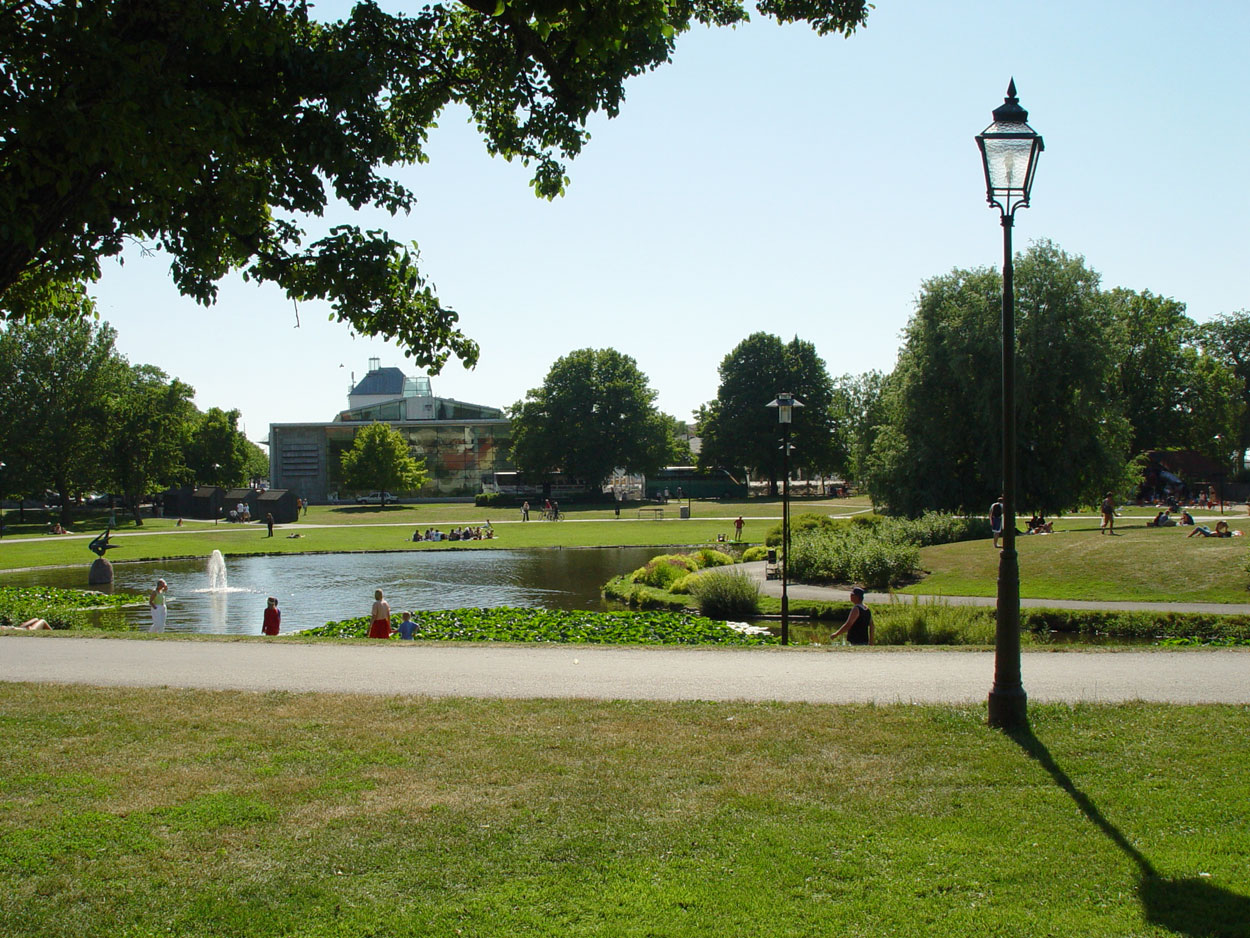
Almedalen park

During the first week of July, Visby is the scene of the Almedalen Week, an important forum for everyone involved in Swedish politics. During the week, representatives from the major political parties in Sweden take turns giving speeches in the Almedalen park.

In August, the tourist season is at its peak. During week 32, from Sunday to Sunday, the annual Medieval Week on Gotland is held. During this week, regularly dressed tourists are outnumbered by people that are dressed in Medieval costumes. The festival started in 1984 and comprises a variety of events including music, jesters, theatre, a medieval market, and jousting tournaments.

The headquarters of the World Ecological Forum is located in Visby.

== Culture and the arts ==
Visby is home to the Baltic Centre for Writers and Translators and Visby International Centre for Composers.

== In popular culture ==
Swedish author Mari Jungstedt set nine detective novels on the island of Gotland. The principal character, DS Anders Knutas, is based at police headquarters in Visby, and there are numerous descriptive passages of the city and the island.

Hayao Miyazaki noted that Visby is the main visual inspiration for the town in Kiki's Delivery Service, with elements of other locations such as Stockholm also blended in.

In 1971, Ingmar Bergman filmed The Touch (Beröringen) with Bibi Andersson, Max von Sydow and Elliott Gould in Visby.

Visby is referenced in the Yorushika song, "Rain with Cappuccino".

== Sports ==
=== Current sport ===
The following sports clubs are located in Visby:

- Endre IF (floorball)
- Visby Ladies (women's basketball)
- Visby IBK (floorball)
- Visby/Roma HK (ice hockey)
- FC Gute (football)
- IFK Visby (football)
- Visby AIK (football)
- Visby Klätterklubb (Climbing)

=== Former sport ===
Motorcycle speedway took place at the Gamla Speedway Track in Galgberget (directly opposite the junction of Hangarvägen and Lummelundsväg). The venue existed from 1951 until 2007 and hosted the Bysarna speedway team, who were four times league champions of Sweden.

== Notable people ==
A number of notable people have originated from Visby, they are included in the Gotland list.

== Gallery ==
History

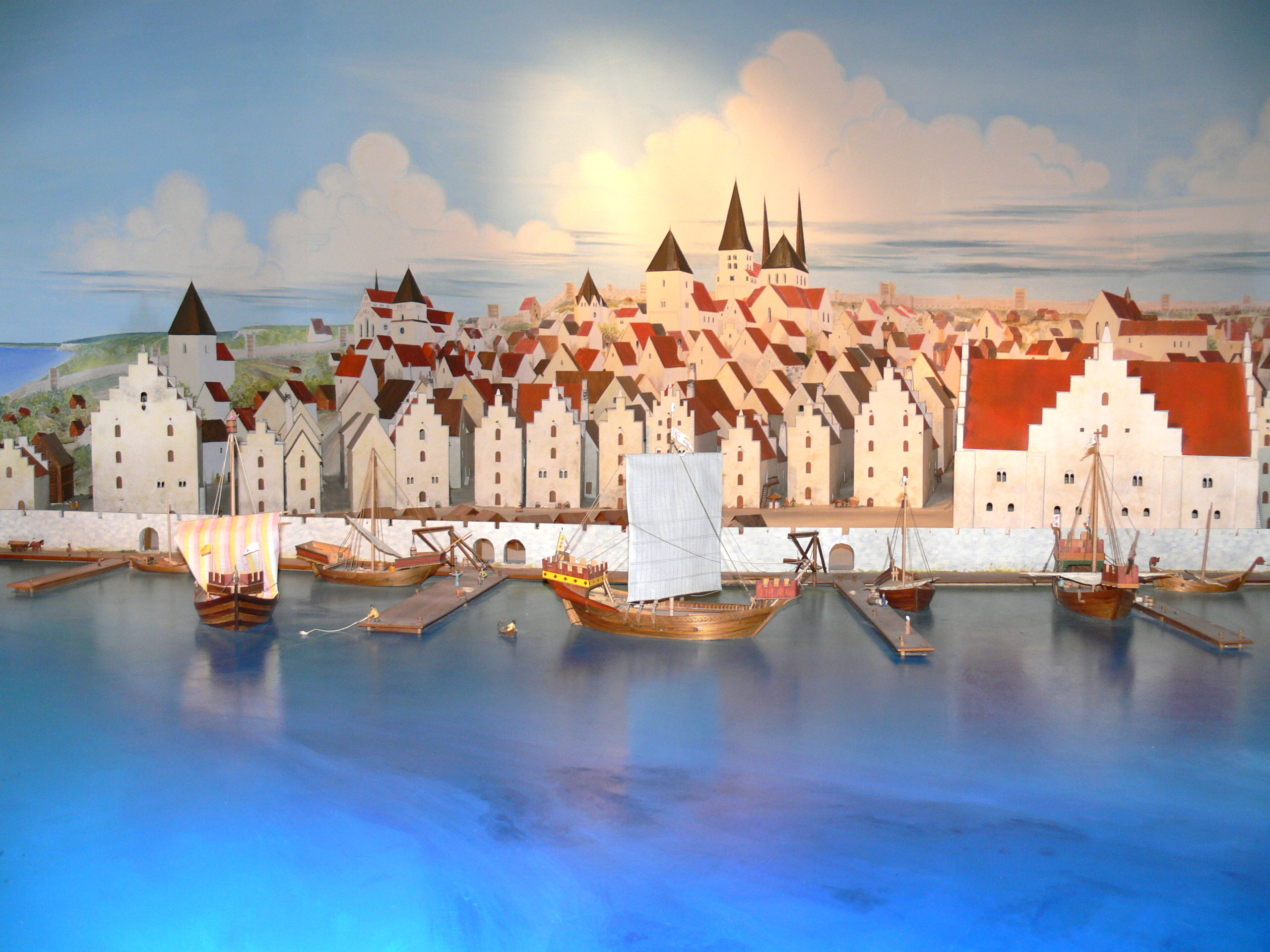
Reconstruction of Visby harbour during the Middle Ages

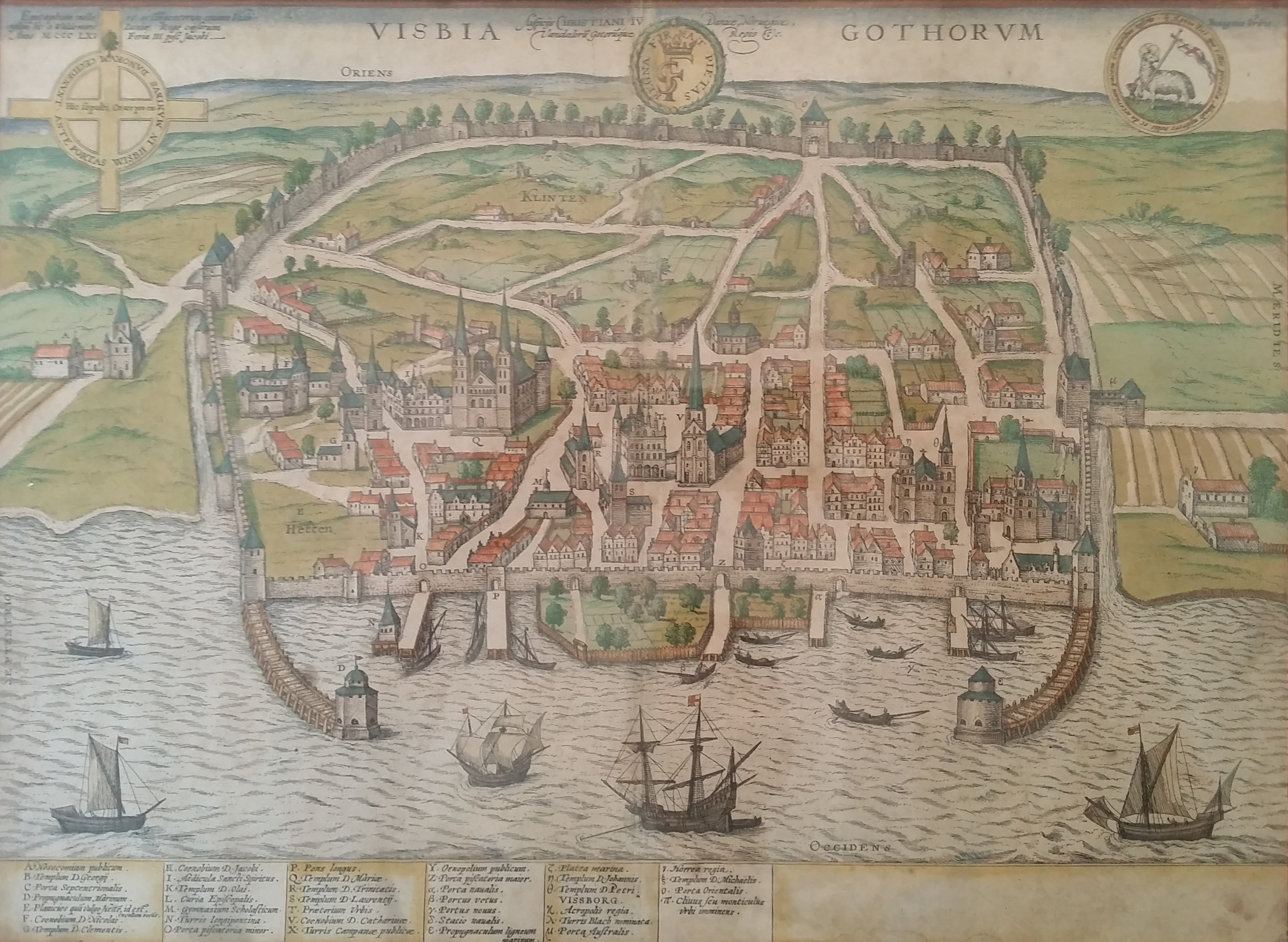
Visby as seen on an engraving from c. 1580

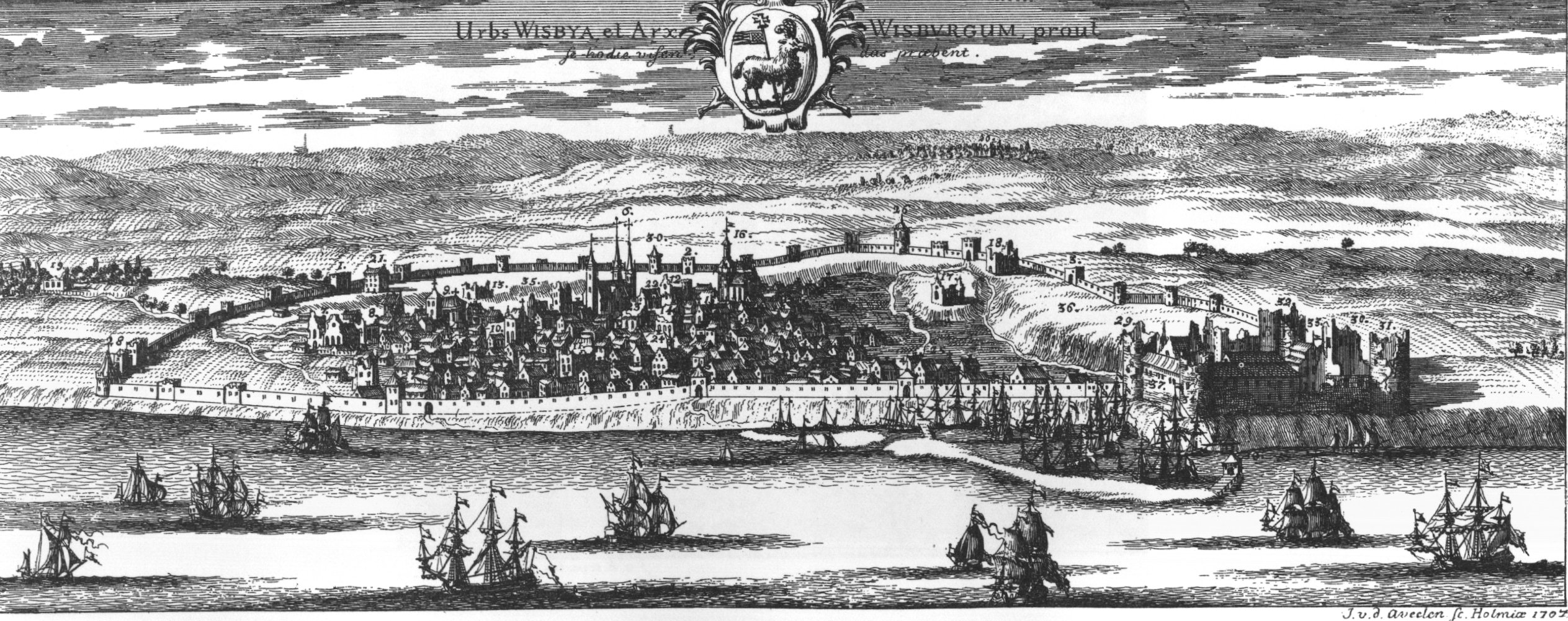
Visby circa 1700, in Suecia Antiqua et Hodierna

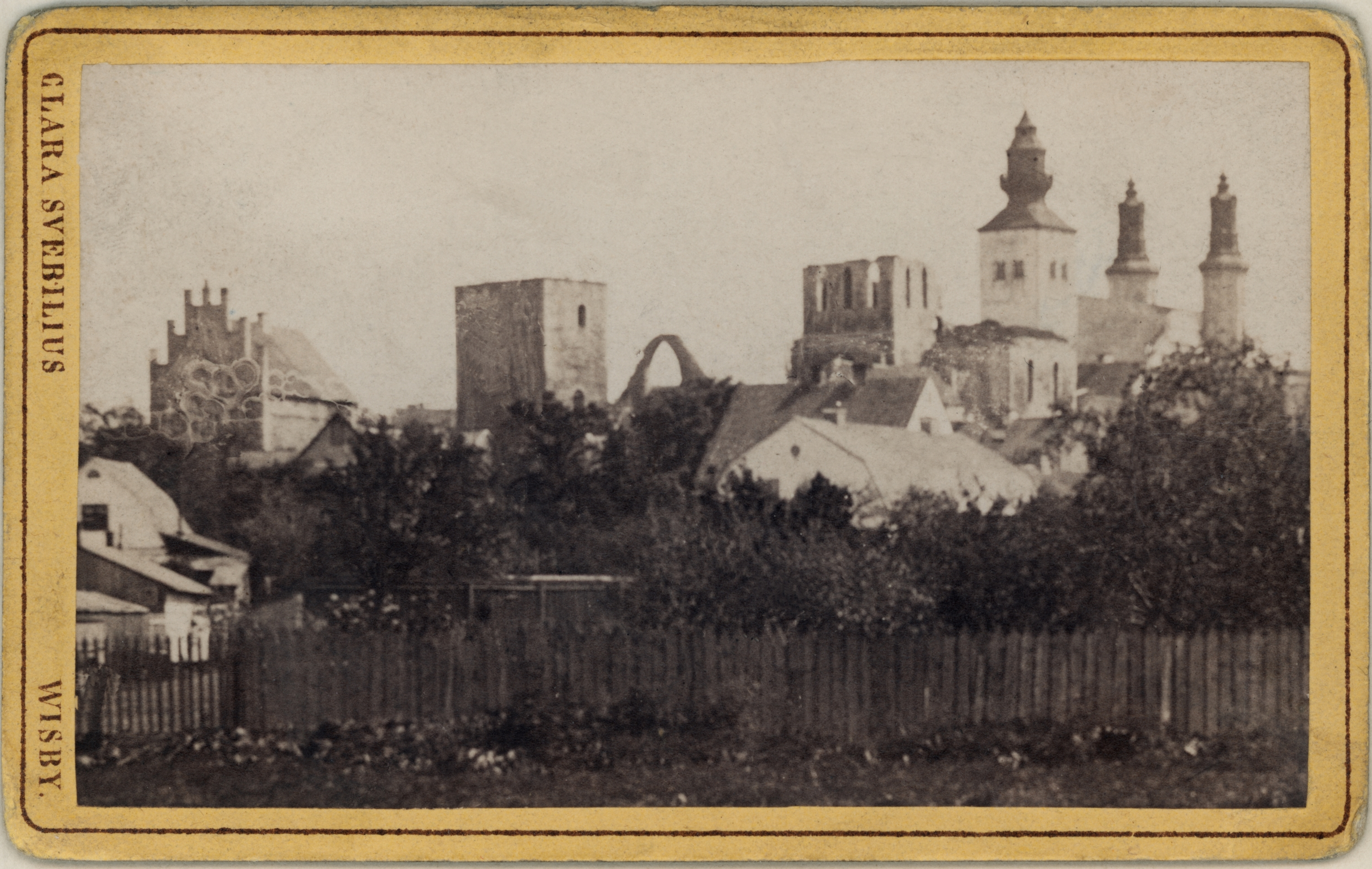
City view including Visby Cathedral in the second half of the 19th century

Main sights

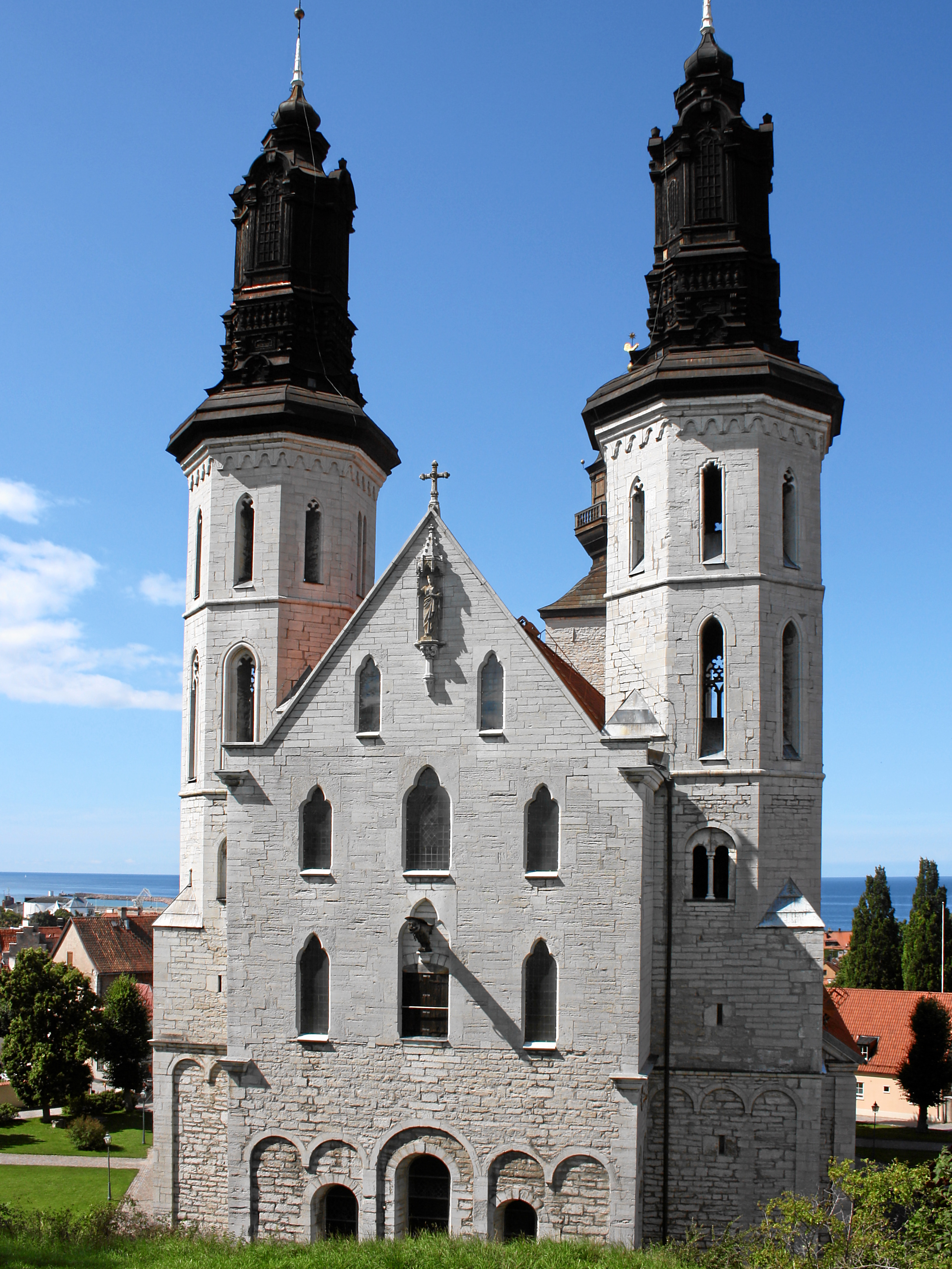
Visby Cathedral, view from the east

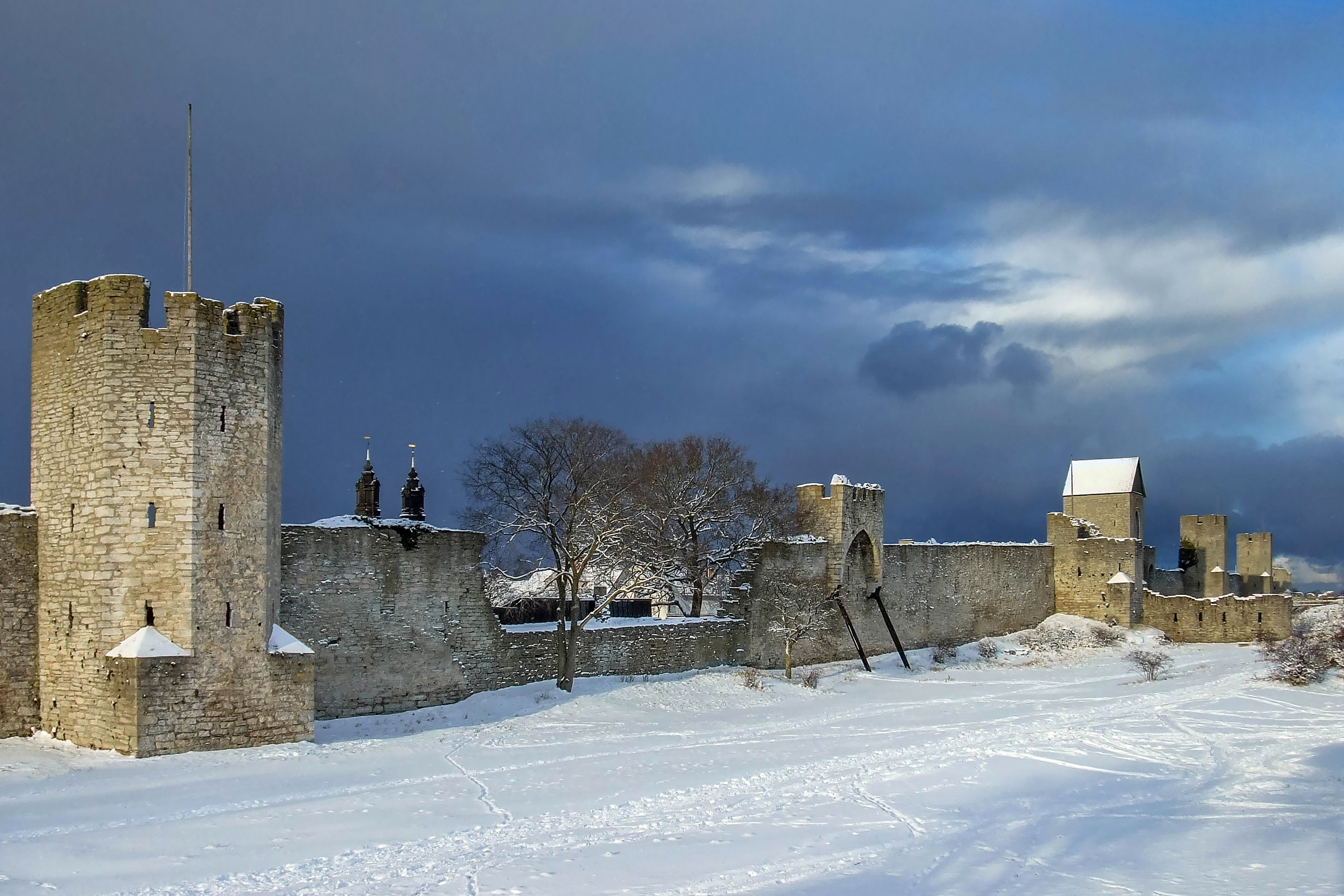
City wall of Visby

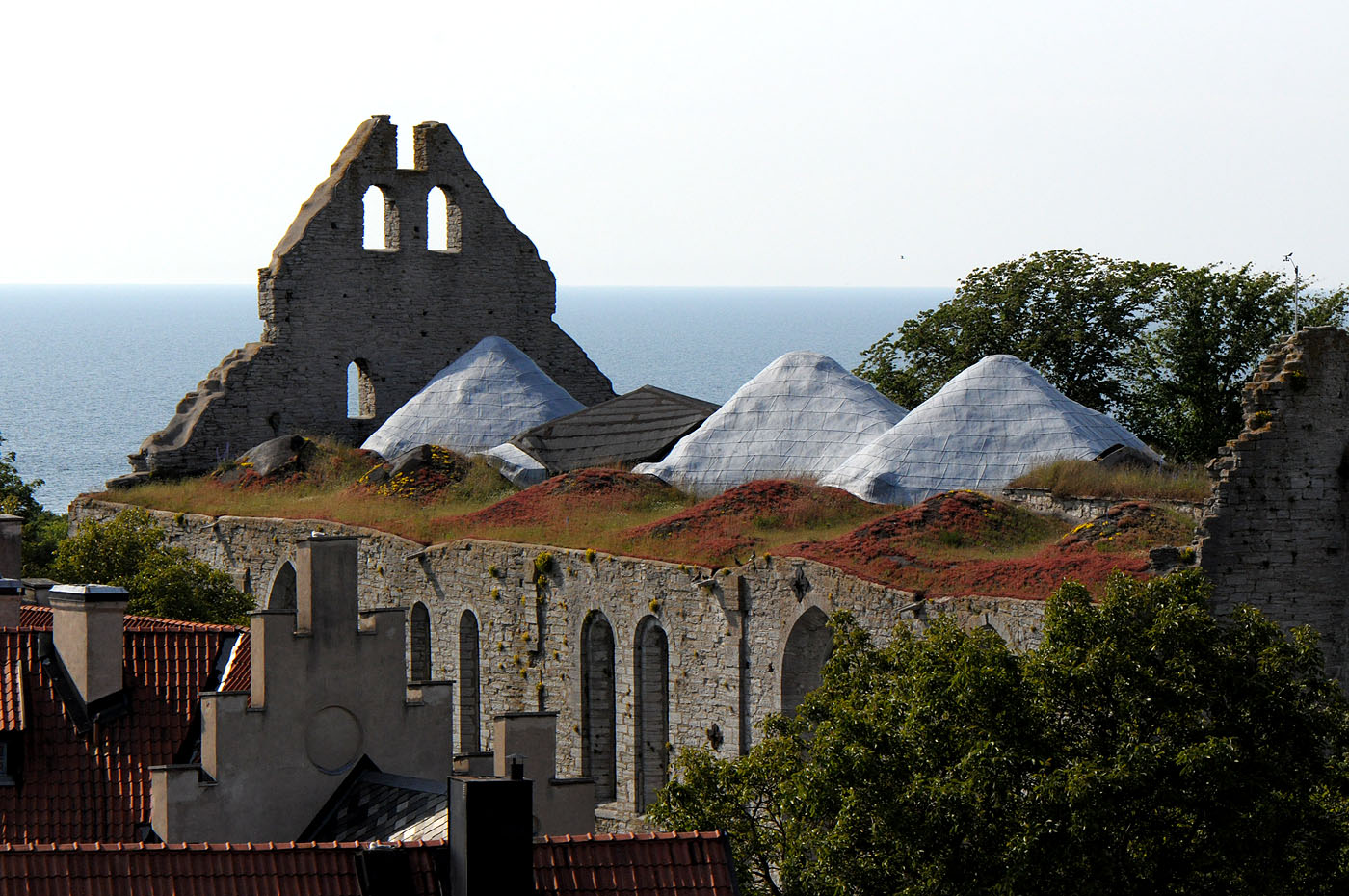
Ruins of St. Nicholas' Church

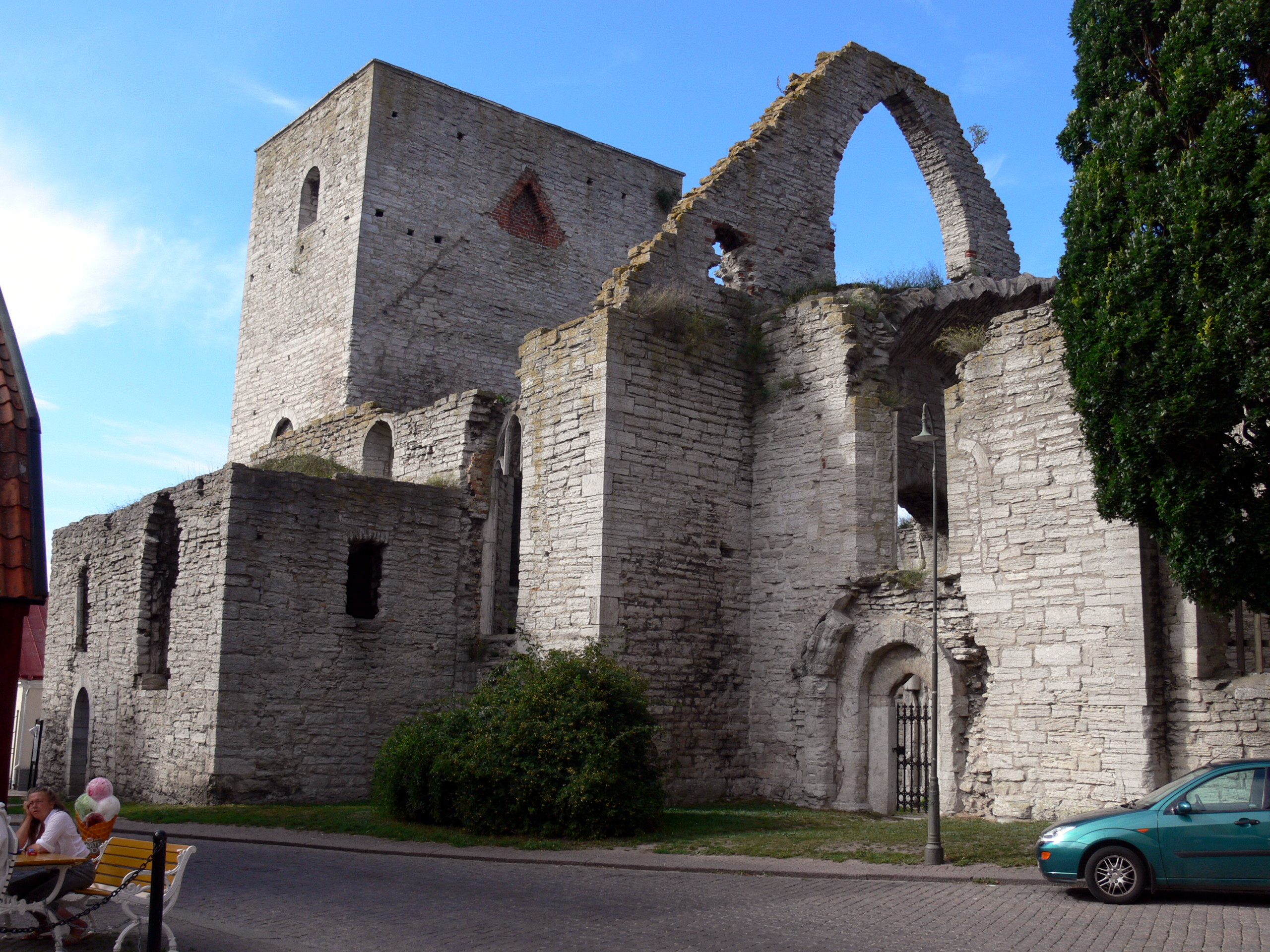
Ruins of St. Drotten's Church

General views

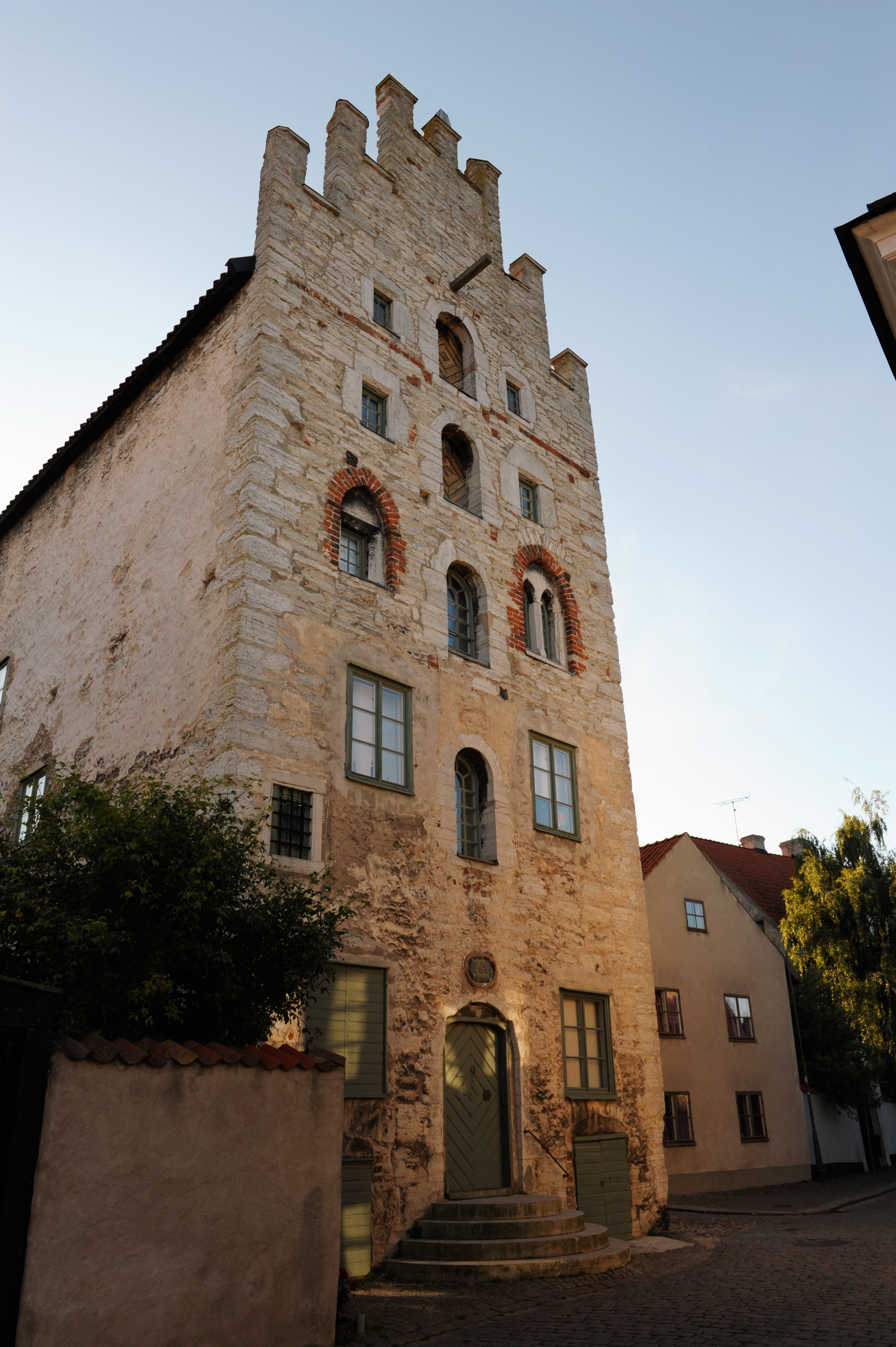
The old pharmacy, Strandgatan

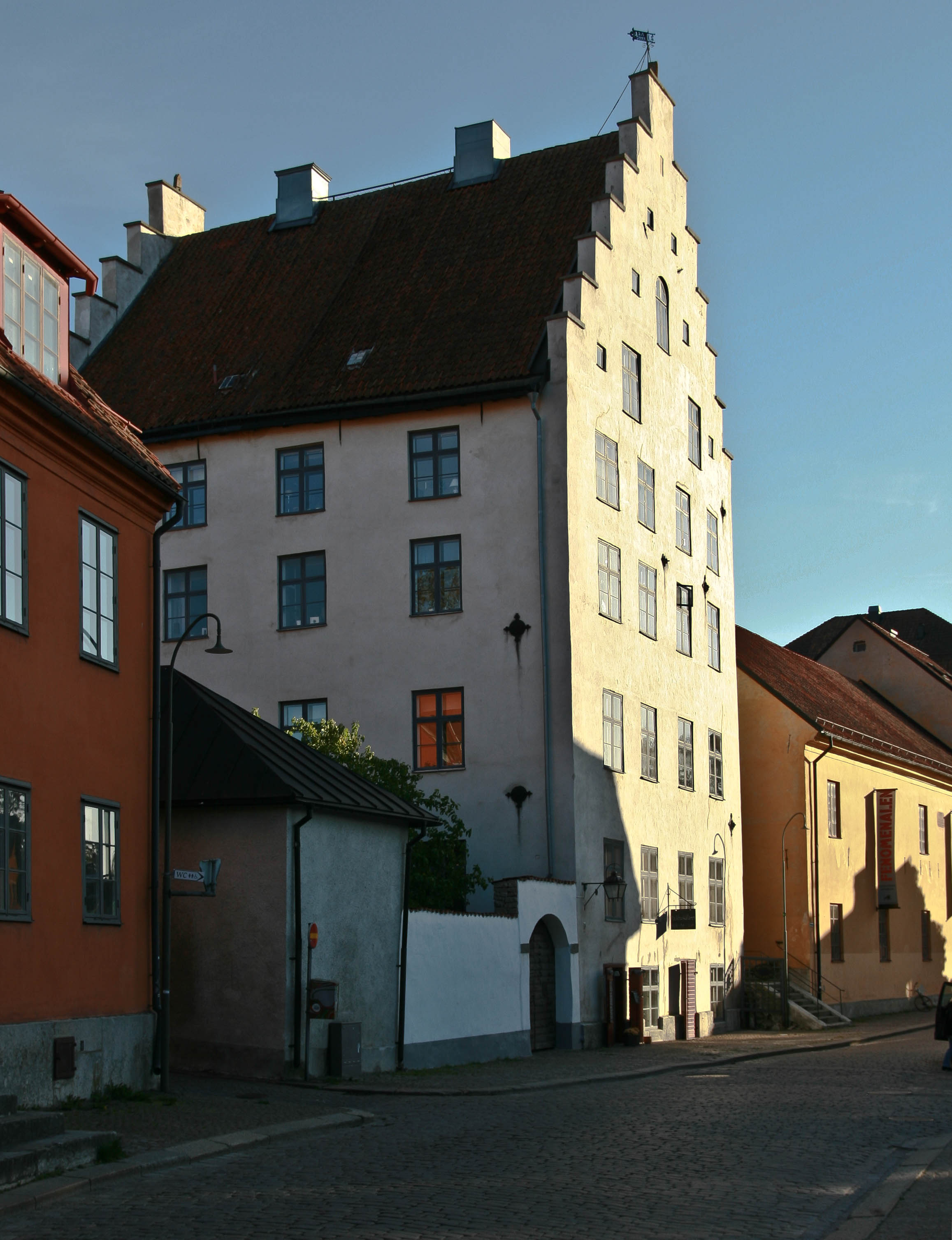
The Liljehornska house, Strandgatan

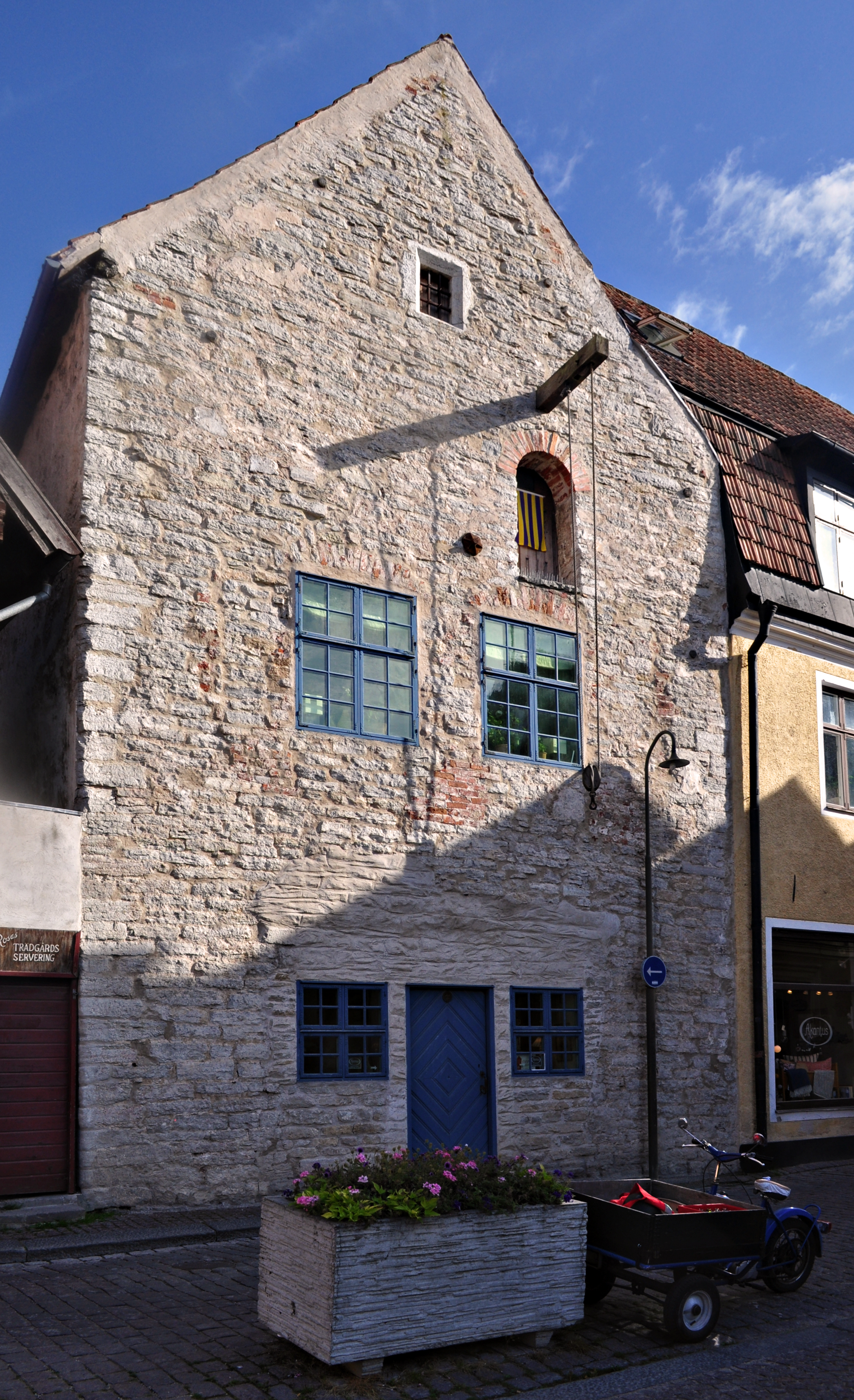
The Hultgrenska house, St Hansgatan

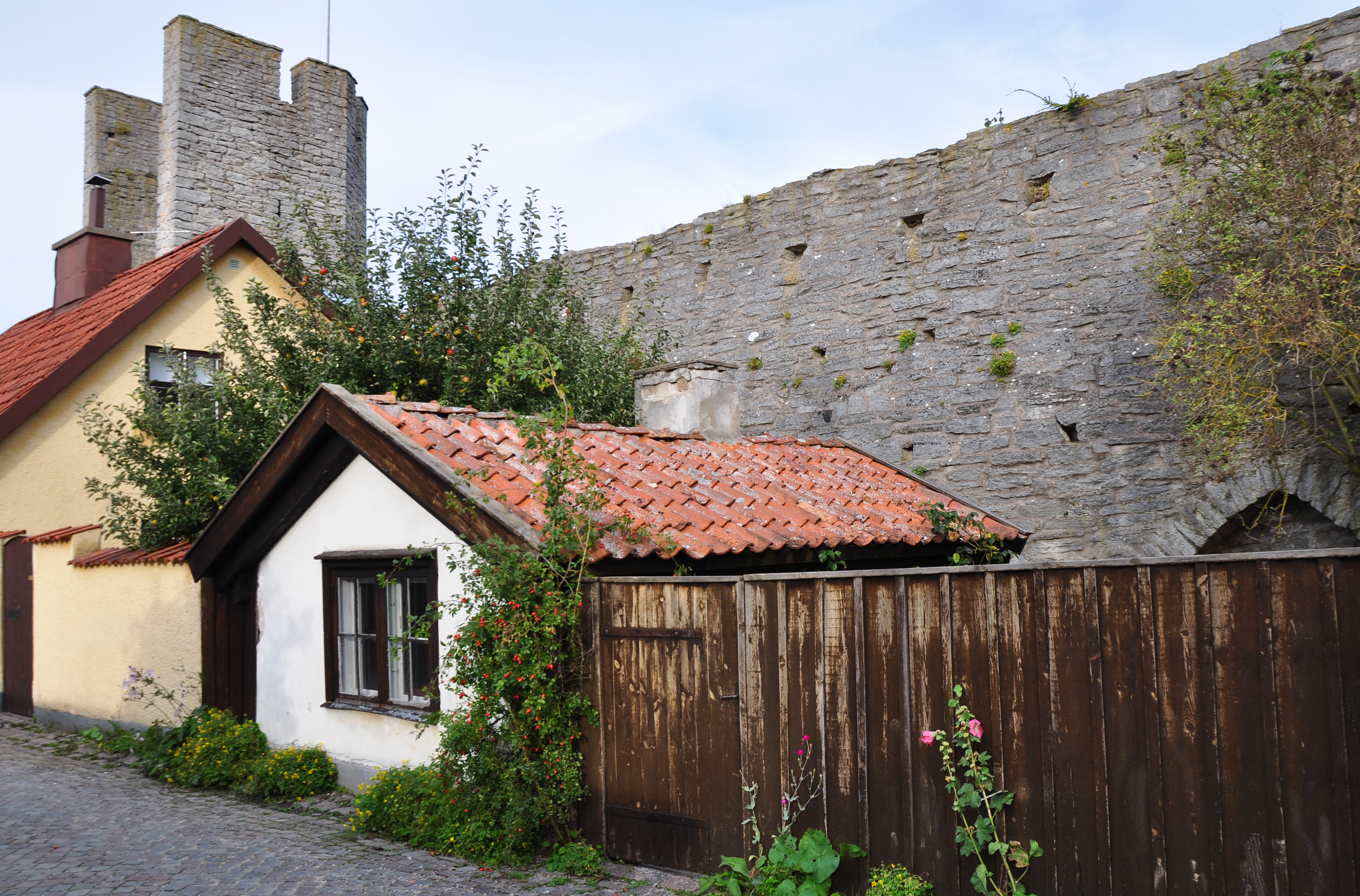
Norra Murgatan

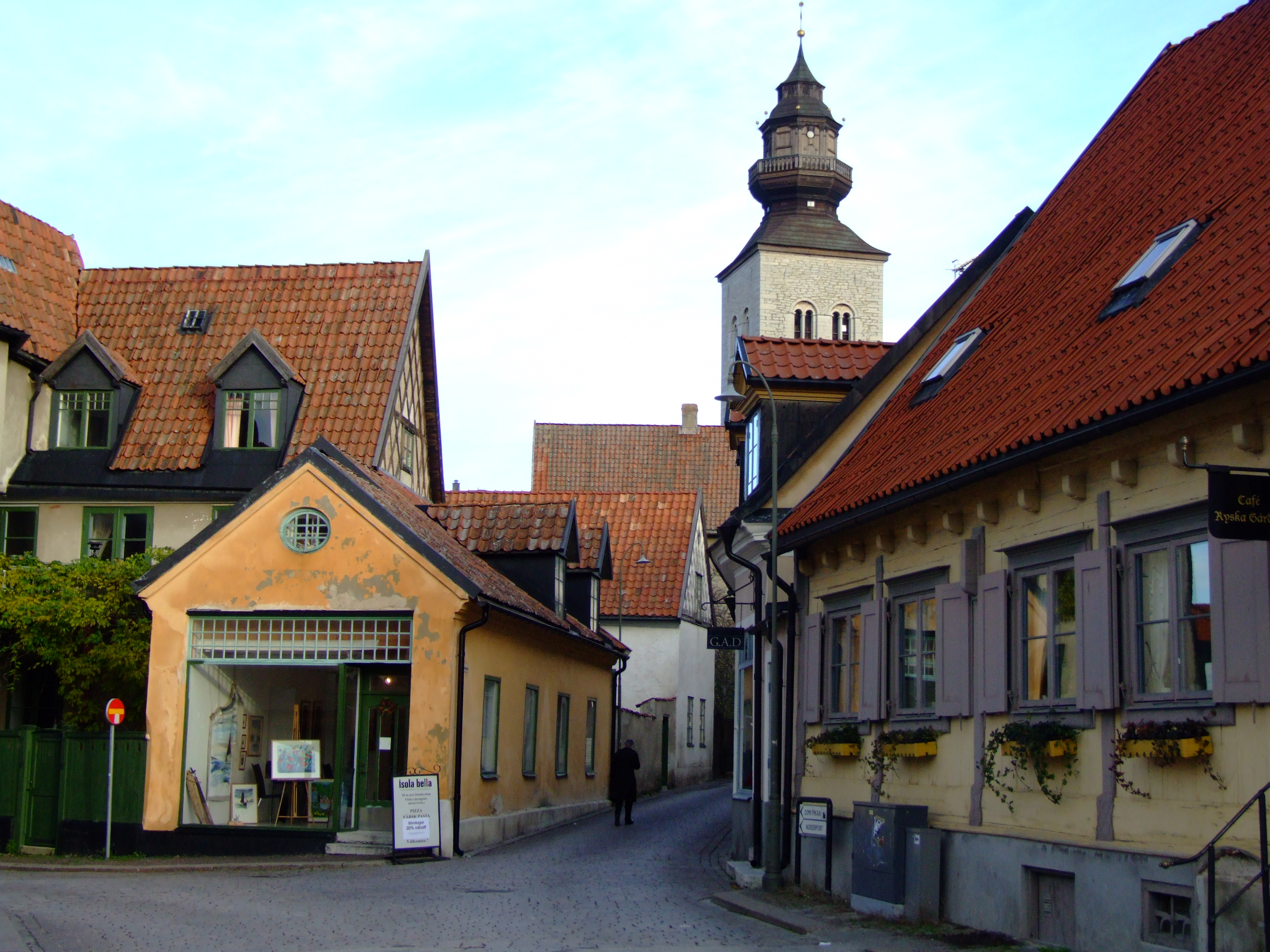
The Main Square and Södra Kyrkogatan

Visby harbour

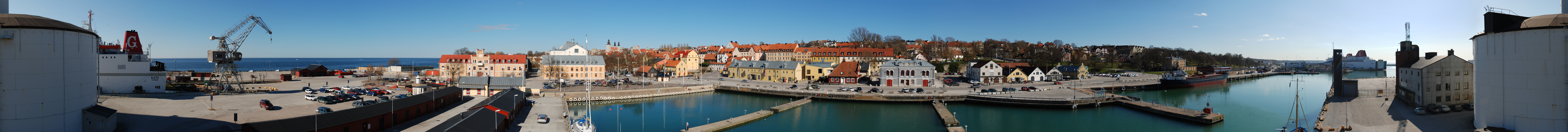
Panorama image of Visby harbour, April 2008

== See also ==
- Galgberget, Visby
- Gotland Museum
- List of churches and chapels on Gotland
- List of governors of Gotland County
- List of people of Gotland

== Bibliography ==
- Björkander, Adolf (1898). Till Visby stads äldsta historia. Ett kritiskt bidrag (in Swedish). Uppsala: ALMQVIST & WIKSELLS BOKTRYCKERI-AKTIEBOLAG – via Project Runeberg.
