= Galgberget, Visby =

The Gallows Hill
- Galgberget (Swedish)
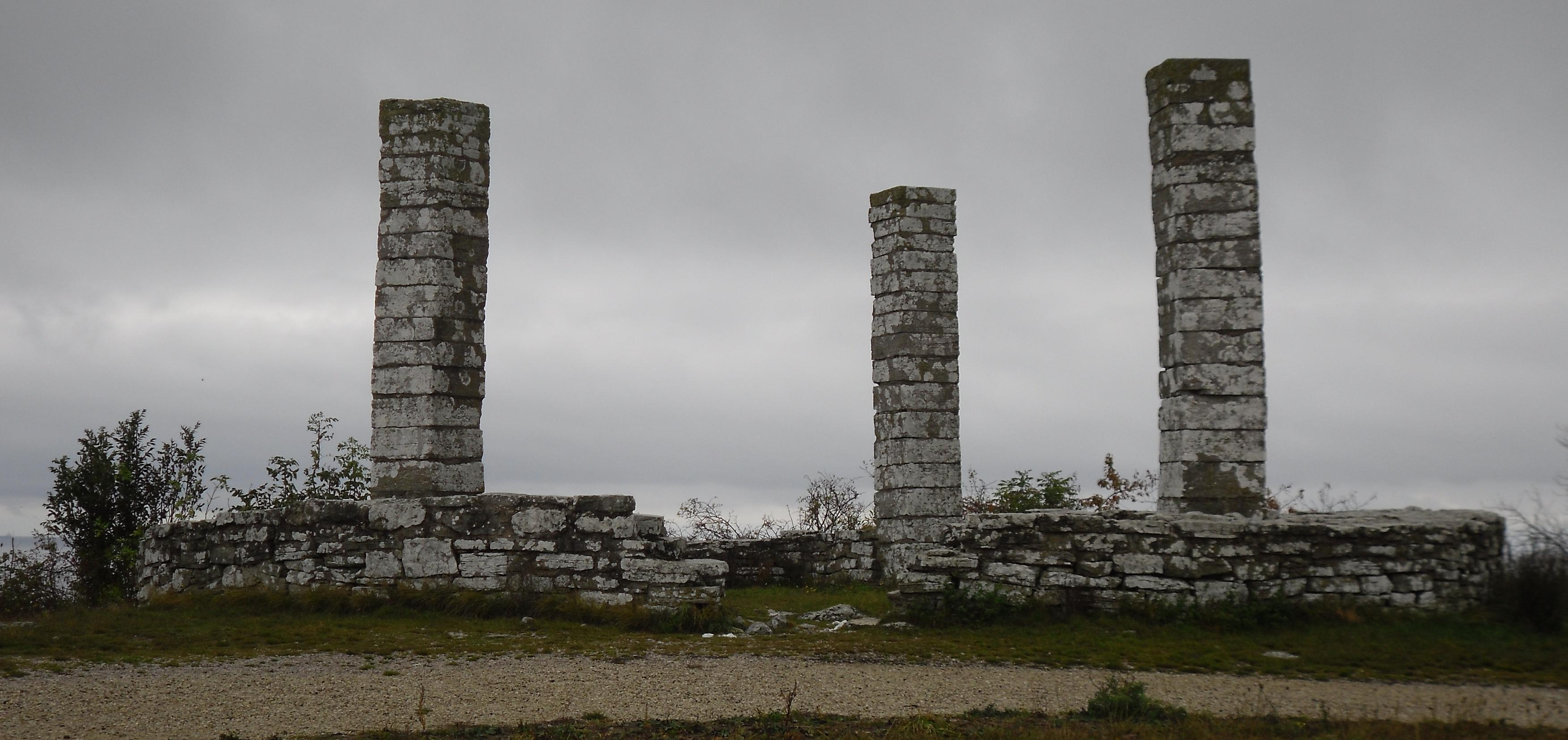
- Gallows at Galgberget, just north of Visby

- Location of Galgberget on Gotland
- 57°39′1″N 18°18′26″E
- Type: Ruin
- Nearest city: Visby.

History
- Founded: 13th century
- Original use: Execution site

Site notes
- Elevation: 34.8 metres (114 ft)
- Current use: Nature reserve
- Owner: Gotland Municipality

Galgberget (the Gallow Hill) is a nature reserve just north of Visby on Gotland, Sweden. The area is bounded to the west by the cliff edge, in the east by County Road 149, and in the south by the town of Visby.

Galgberget is named after the still remaining gallows, built during the 13th century, where local criminals used to be executed. It was claimed to be the only preserved Medieval execution site in Europe however there is another one near Furtner Teich, Austria. The gallows consist of a low, circular stone wall with three pillars of stone rising from it. Wooden beams rested on the pillars, and criminals were hanged from these using ropes and hooks. It is believed that the gallows were in use until 1845. The gallows were situated so that there was a clear view of them in Visby and from the sea, so that everyone could view those who had been executed. In July 2008, archaeologists from the Gotland Museum found the bones of some 30 people who had been executed, presumably on the spot, in an archaeological trench inside the stone circle of the gallows.

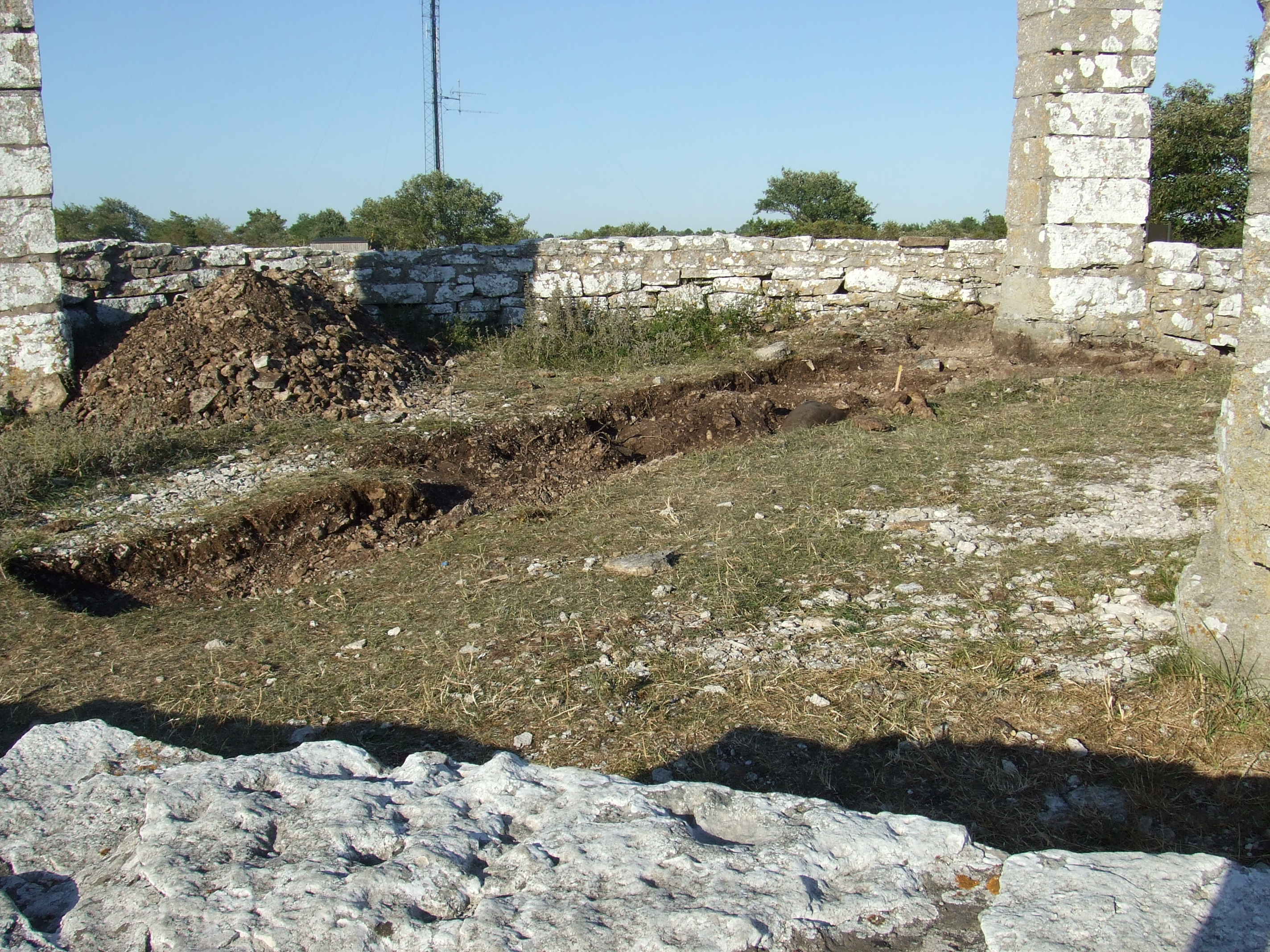
Archeological trench during the excavation in 2008

The area has barren vegetation due to its limestone constitution, the most common plant being Prunus spinosa, commonly called the blackthorn or sloe. It is a popular hiking area. Galgberget also has the ruin of a lime kiln and a disused motor stadium. As of 2015, there are also a number of recently built apartment houses.

During the Medieval Week reenactment of the Battle of Visby in 2008, the local branch of the Society for Creative Anachronism organized a medieval tent camp at Galgberget.
