= Sören Karlsson =

Swedish speedway rider

- Born: 23 October 1946 (age 80); Örebro, Sweden
- Nationality: Swedish

Career history

Sweden
- 1970-1972, 1980-1984: Indianerna
- 1973-1979: Vargarna

Great Britain
- 1973: Coventry Bees
- 1975: Sheffield Tigers
- 1976-1978: Swindon Robins

Team honours
- 1975: Speedway World Team Cup bronze medal
- 1972: Allsvenskan Div 2 (West) Champion

Sören Karlsson (born 23 October 1946) is a former international motorcycle speedway rider from Sweden. He earned 29 caps for the Sweden national speedway team.

== Speedway career ==
Karlsson won a bronze medal at the Speedway World Team Cup in the 1975 Speedway World Team Cup.

Karlsson rode in the top tier of British Speedway from 1973 to 1978, riding for various clubs. He rode for Coventry Bees, Sheffield Tigers and Swindon Robins.

== World final appearances ==
=== World Team Cup ===
- 1975 – (West Germany) Norden, Motodrom Halbemond (with Tommy Jansson / Bernt Persson / Sören Sjösten / Anders Michanek) – 3rd – 17pts
- 1977 - (Poland) Wrocław, Olympic Stadium (with Bengt Jansson / Anders Michanek / Tommy Nilsson / Bernt Persson) - 4th - 11pts (0)
