= Christer Löfqvist =

Swedish speedway rider

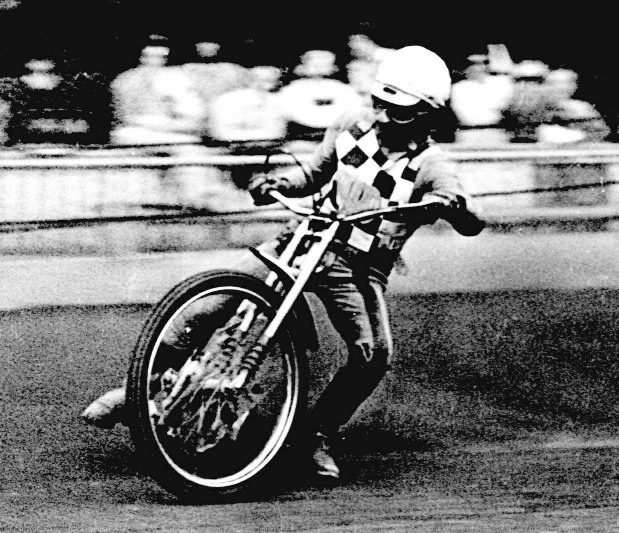
- Born: 4 June 1944; Visby, Sweden
- Died: 1 February 1978 (aged 33)
- Nationality: Swedish

Career history

Sweden
- 1967-1975: Bysarna
- 1976: Njudungarna

Great Britain
- 1970-1971: West Ham Hammers
- 1972-1973: Poole Pirates
- 1975: Hackney Hawks

Individual honours
- 1967: Swedish U21 champion

Team honours
- 1971, 1972, 1975, 1976: Allsvenskan Champion
- 1970: Allsvenskan Div 2 Champion
- 1969: Allsvenskan Div 3 East Champion
- 1971: Swedish Pairs Champion

Christer Löfqvist (4 June 1944 in Visby, Gotland, Sweden – 1 February 1978) was an international motorcycle speedway rider from Sweden. He earned 42 caps for the Sweden national speedway team.

== Career ==
Löfqvist reached the final of the Speedway World Championship in 1974. In the Swedish Speedway Team Championship he rode for Bysarna and Njudungarna.

Löfqvist competed in Great Britain for West Ham Hammers, Poole Pirates, and the Hackney Hawks.

== Family and death ==
Löfqvist's son Dennis was also an international speedway rider. Christer Löfqvist was diagnosed with a brain tumour and died in 1978 aged 33.

== World Final Appearances ==
=== Individual World Championship ===
- 1972 - (England) London, Wembley Stadium - 4th - 11pts
- 1974 - (Sweden) Gothenburg, Ullevi - 9th - 8pts

=== World Team Cup ===
- 1972 - (West Germany) Olching, Olching Speedwaybahn (with Tommy Jansson / Jan Simensen / Anders Michanek / Göte Nordin) 4th - 18pts (6)
- 1974 - (Poland) Chorzów, Silesian Stadium (with Anders Michanek / Sören Sjösten / Tommy Jansson) - 2nd - 31pts (5)
- 1976 - (England) London, White City Stadium (with Anders Michanek / Bengt Jansson / Bernt Persson / Lars-Åke Andersson) - 3rd - 26pts (1)
