= Gustavsvik, Gotland =

Gustavsvik
- Location within Sweden
- Coordinates: 57°39′40″N 18°19′00″E
- Country: Sweden
- Province: Gotland
- County: Gotland County
- Municipality: Gotland Municipality

Area
  - Total: 0.88 km^{2} (0.34 sq mi)

Population (31 December 2010)
  - Total: 453
  - Density: 514/km^{2} (1,330/sq mi)
- Time zone: UTC+1 (CET)
  - Summer (DST): UTC+2 (CEST)

Gustavsvik (or Norra Visby) is a locality situated in Gotland Municipality, Gotland County, on the island of Gotland, Sweden with 453 inhabitants in 2010.
