= Tommy Jansson =

Swedish speedway racer

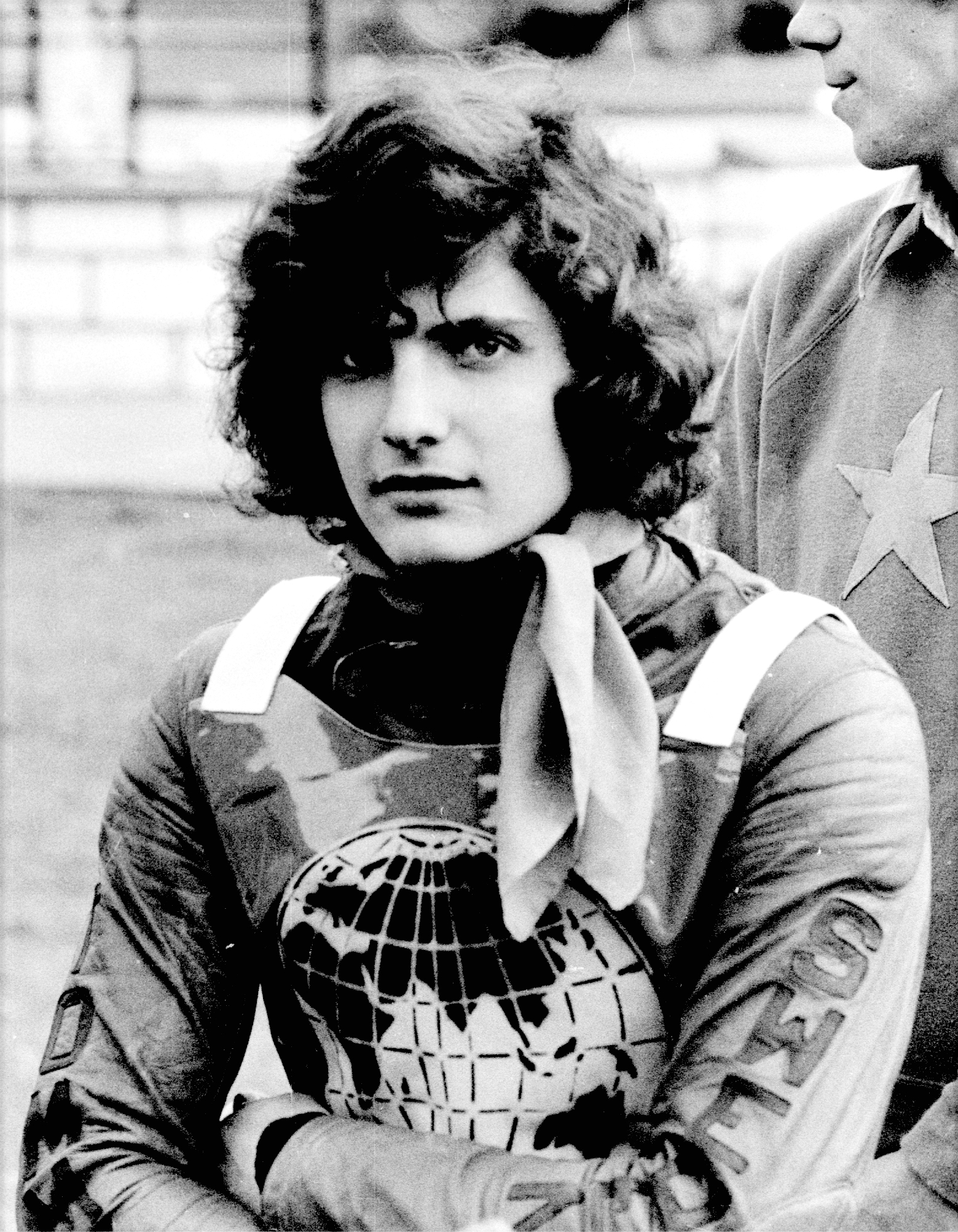
- Born: 2 October 1952; Eskilstuna, Sweden
- Died: 20 May 1976 (aged 23)
- Nationality: Swedish

Career history

Sweden
- 1969-1976: Smederna

Great Britain
- 1971: Wembley Lions
- 1972-1973 1975-1976: Wimbledon Dons

Individual honours
- 1970: Swedish U21 champion
- 1974: Swedish Champion
- 1975: Southern Riders Champion
- 1975: The Laurels

Team honours
- 1973, 1975: World Pairs Champion
- 1972: Swedish Pairs Champion
- 1973: Allsvenskan Champion
- 1971: Allsvenskan Div 2 (West) Champion

Per Tommy Jansson (2 October 1952 – 20 May 1976) was a motorcycle speedway rider. He was one of Sweden's most exciting speedway prospects in the 1970s but was killed in the Swedish Final a World Championship Qualifying Round meeting. He earned 52 caps for the Sweden national speedway team.

== Speedway career ==
Jansson initially appeared in the UK on 23 July 1970 while touring with the Young Sweden team in a British League Division Two test series against Young England. He rode at Teesside, scoring ten points. He was injured in the second test match, at Workington, the following night, and he returned to Sweden.

Jansson came to England in 1971 to ride for the Wembley Lions making his debut on 9 April, in an away match against Wolverhampton, where he scored six points. But his stay with the Lions only lasted for three British League Division One matches. Although he did continue to race in the UK for the Young Sweden touring team, against Young England in a British League Division Two test series, he never rode a home match at Wembley for the Lions, because at this time their home matches were taking place at Newport, in Wales.

In 1972, Jansson made his debut for the Wimbledon Dons on 15 June, at home to Wolverhampton, scoring ten points. He later returned to Sweden to complete his National Service during the 1973 British League season, after competing in several league matches.

In 1973, Jansson won the 1973 Speedway World Pairs Championship partnering Anders Michanek.

In 1974, when all Swedish based riders were banned from riding in the British League, Jansson only rode in open meetings: at Wimbledon, and in an International Test Match series against England. He also became the champion of Sweden by winning the 1974 Speedway Swedish Individual Championship. In 1975, he won his second World Pairs Championship with Anders Michanek.

Jansson's last appearance at Plough Lane (Wimbledon's home) was on Thursday, 13 May 1976, in a Marlboro Southern Riders Championship qualifying round (which he was the reigning Champion). He won this meeting with a 15-point maximum. Prior to this meeting, he beat Dave Jessup (Reading) 2-1 (after suffering a first race engine failure) to retain his Golden Helmet British Match Race Championship. Jansson's last meeting in the UK was at Halifax, in a British League Division One match, on Saturday, 15 May. He scored 12 points from five rides.

In Sweden, Jansson rode for Smederna. At the time of his death, aged only 23, he had already appeared in four World finals. Jansson also rode in four speedway World Team Cup Finals for Sweden: in 1972, 1973, 1974, and 1975.

Jansson was killed in an accident in a World Championship qualifying race at Gubbængens Idrottsplads speedway in Stockholm on the 20 May 1976.

Jansson was the last rider to hold the British Speedway Golden Helmet. The original Golden Helmet was given to his family after his death.

== Family ==
Jansson was the son of former Swedish International speedway rider Joel Jansson. His brother Bo (Bosse) Jansson was also a speedway rider.

== World final appearances ==
=== Individual World Championship ===
- 1971 - (Sweden) Gothenburg, Ullevi - 14th - 1pt
- 1973 - (Poland) Chorzów, Silesian Stadium - Reserve - 0pts
- 1974 - (Sweden) Göteborg, Ullevi - Reserve - 3pts
- 1975 - (England) London, Wembley Stadium - 9th - 7pts

=== World Pairs Championship ===
- 1973 - (Sweden) Borås (with Anders Michanek) - Winner - 24pts (9)
- 1975 - (Poland) Wrocław, Olympic Stadium (with Anders Michanek) - Winner - 24pts (7)

=== World Team Cup ===
- 1972 - (West Germany) Olching, Olching Speedwaybahn (with Jan Simensen / Anders Michanek / Christer Lofqvist / Göte Nordin) 4th - 18pts (4)
- 1973 - (England) London, Wembley Stadium (with Anders Michanek / Bernt Persson / Bengt Jansson) - 2nd - 31pts (5)
- 1974 - (Poland) Chorzów, Silesian Stadium (with Anders Michanek / Sören Sjösten / Christer Lofqvist) - 2nd - 31pts (7)
- 1975 - (West Germany) Norden, Motodrom Halbemond (with Anders Michanek / Bernt Persson / Sören Sjösten / Sören Karlsson) - 3rd - 17pts (4)

== See also ==
- Rider deaths in motorcycle speedway
