= Sören Sjösten =

Swedish speedway rider

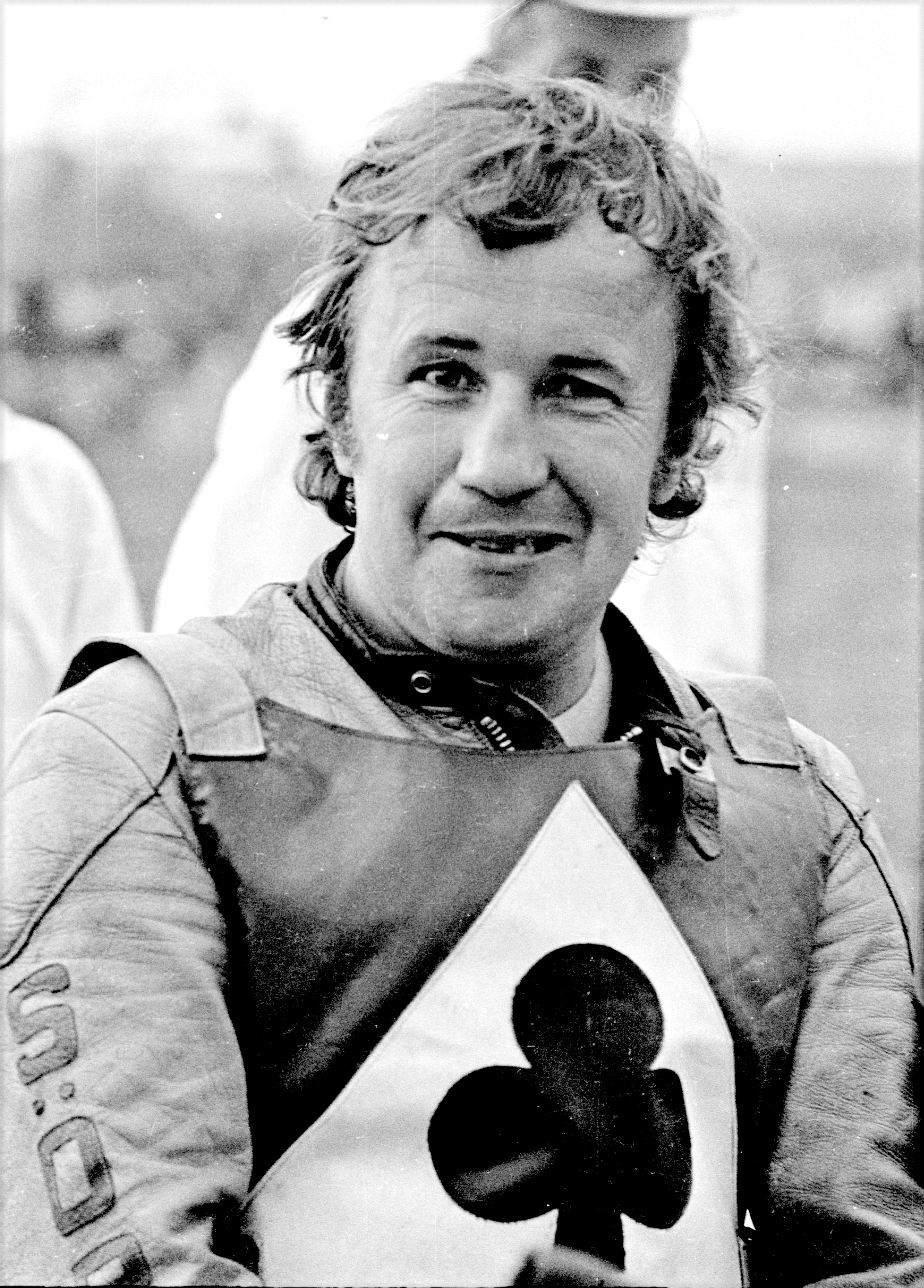
- Born: 12 December 1938; Krylbo, Sweden
- Died: April 1999 (aged 60)
- Nationality: Swedish

Career history

Sweden
- 1958–1959: Folkare
- 1960–1968: Vargarna
- 1969–1970, 1979: Masarna
- 1971–1978: Bysarna

Great Britain
- 1962–1964, 1967–1975: Belle Vue Aces
- 1976: Birmingham Brummies
- 1977: Wolverhampton Wolves
- 1978: Bristol Bulldogs

Individual honours
- 1959: Swedish U21 champion
- 1965: Nordic Champion

Team honours
- 1962, 1964, 1970: World Team Cup Winner
- 1974: World Pairs Champion
- 1960, 1961, 1971, 1972, 1975: Allsvenskan Champion
- 1959, 1964: Allsvenskan Div 2 Champion
- 1964, 1968, 1977: Swedish Pairs Champion
- 1963: National League Champion
- 1970, 1971, 1972: British League Champion
- 1972, 1973, 1975: British League KO Cup Winner
- 1975: Northern Trophy

Sören Willy Ernfrid Sjösten (12 December 1938 – April 1999) was a Swedish motorcycle speedway rider. He earned 76 caps for the Sweden national speedway team.

== Life and career ==
Sjösten was born on 12 December 1938. He won the world pairs championship in 1974 with Anders Michanek and became world team champion three times representing Sweden, in 1962, 1964 and 1970. Sjösten also appeared in six individual World Championship Finals with two bronze medals as best result. Both third places was received after losing race-off heats for silver medal, the first time to Barry Briggs and the second time to Ivan Mauger

Sjösten rode for Masarna, Vargarna and Bysarna in the Swedish leagues and for Belle Vue Aces, Wolverhampton Wolves and Bristol Bulldogs in the British League. An excellent starter, he was renowned for having a 'wild' style of riding with the rear of the bike sliding further out on the bends than is usual and was often considered rough on his opponents.

Sjösten retired after his younger brother Christer was killed in a meeting in Brisbane, Australia in 1979. He died in April 1999.

== World final appearances ==
=== Individual World Championship ===
- 1962 – (England) London, Wembley Stadium - 9th - 8pts
- 1965 – (England) London, Wembley Stadium - 7th - 9pts
- 1969 – (England) London, Wembley Stadium - 3rd - 11pts
- 1970 – (Poland) Wrocław, Olympic Stadium - 4th - 9pts
- 1971 – (Sweden) Gothenburg, Ullevi - 8th - 8pts
- 1974 – (Sweden) Gothenburg, Ullevi - 3rd - 11pts

=== World Pairs Championship ===
- 1974 – (England) Manchester, Hyde Road (with Anders Michanek) - Winner - 28pts (14)

=== World Team Cup ===
- 1961 – (Poland) Wrocław, Olympic Stadium (with Ove Fundin / Rune Sörmander / Björn Knutson / Per Tage Svensson) - 2nd - 30pts (2)
- 1962 – (West Germany) Slaný, Slaný Speedway Stadium (with Björn Knutson / Ove Fundin / Göte Nordin / Rune Sörmander) - Winner - 36pts (10)
- 1964 – (West Germany) Abensberg, Abensberg Stadion (with Ove Fundin / Björn Knutson / Göte Nordin / Rune Sörmander) - Winner - 34pts (0)
- 1969 – (Poland) Rybnik, Rybnik Municipal Stadium (with Bengt Jansson / Ove Fundin / Anders Michanek / Torbjörn Harrysson) - 4th - 12pts (2)
- 1970 – (England) London, Wembley Stadium (with Bengt Jansson / Ove Fundin / Anders Michanek) - Winner - 42pts (10)
- 1971 – (Poland) Wrocław, Olympic Stadium (with Anders Michanek / Bernt Persson / Bengt Jansson / Leif Enecrona) - 4th - 18pts
- 1974 – (Poland) Chorzów, Silesian Stadium (with Anders Michanek / Tommy Jansson / Christer Lofqvist) - 2nd - 31pts (10)
- 1975 – (West Germany) Norden, Motodrom Halbemond (with Anders Michanek / Tommy Jansson / Bernt Persson / Sören Karlsson) - 3rd - 17pts (1)
