= World 240 Invitational Superstock Championship =

Championship held at Paradise Valley Speedway in Rotorua, New Zealand

- Category: Superstocks
- Country: New Zealand
- Inaugural season: 1987
- Drivers: 107 (2019)
- Manufacturers: Jaguar, Ford, Nissan, Toyota, Chevrolet
- Tire suppliers: Hoosier Racing Tire
- Drivers' champion: (New Zealand) Jamie Hamilton 9G

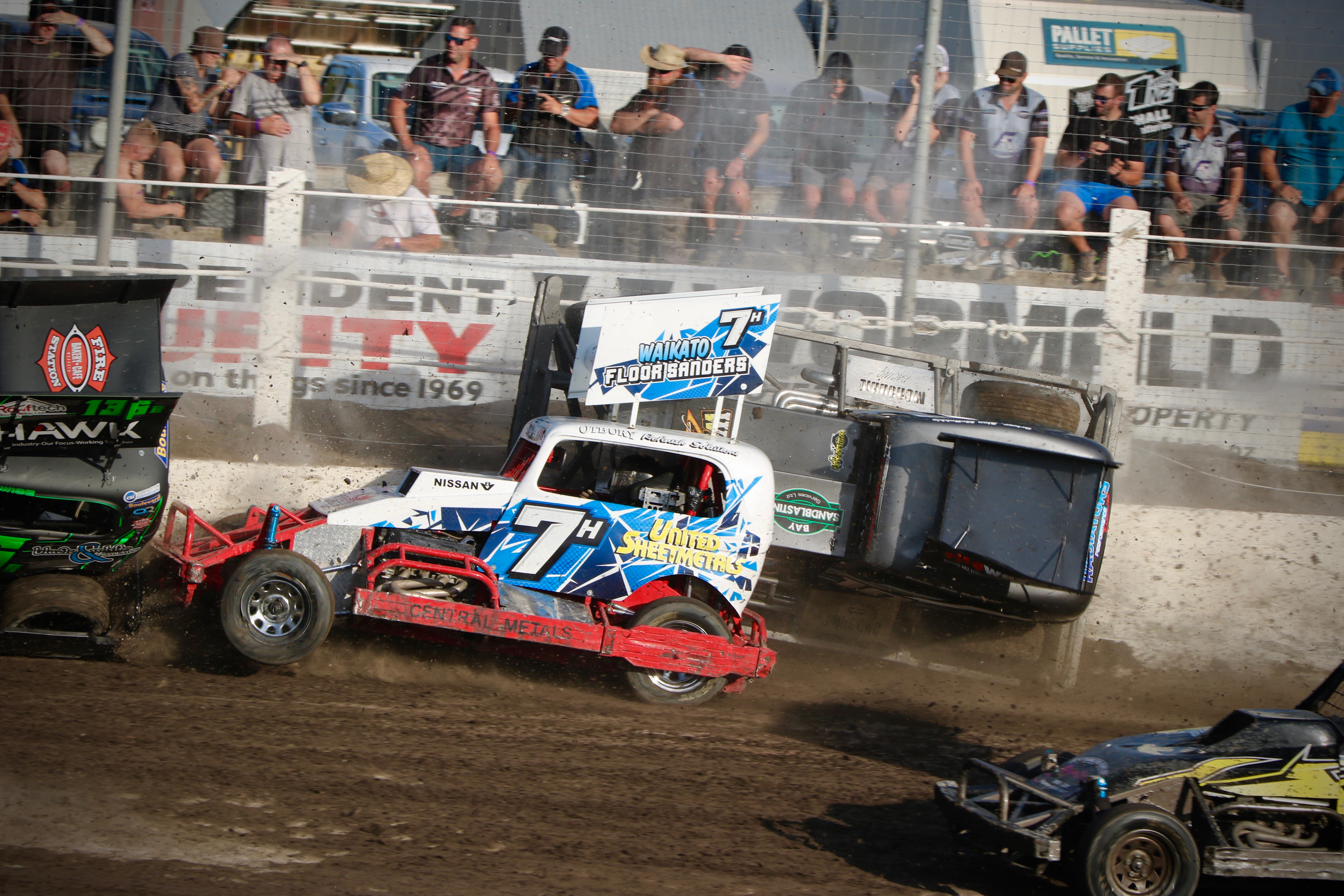
7H Dave Moore giving 10R Alan McRobbie a ride up the wall.

The World 240 Invitational Superstock Championship is an annually hosted championship held at Paradise Valley Speedway in Rotorua, New Zealand. Contested with drivers often from the United Kingdom, Netherlands, America and New Zealand the championship winner shall be invited to compete in the BriSCA Formula 1 Stock Cars World Championship along with the winner of the New Zealand Superstock Championship in a fully funded campaign. The current champion is Ethan Rees from gisborne who won in 2023

The titles is unique to other superstocks racing championships with the 240s event allowing for a number of drivers to become pre-qualified to the finals field of 26 drivers. This makes the 240 championship one of the most difficult titles to master, as spots within the finals field became scarce with 5 international drivers being automatically seeded to the finals together with the defending 240s champion and with the winner of the second tier championship held on finals night. Held over just 3 races of 15 laps, the need for the best possible points result is a must with even 1 DNF making it nearly impossible to win the title.

== Engines ==
Current Speedway New Zealand rules stipulate the engine must be no larger the 248 cubic inches, with teams using small block V8 race engines. The estimated power output figure is around 500hp. Most cars tend to run:

- Toyota VVTI V8
- Nissan VK56 V8
- Nissan VH41 V8
- Ford V8
- Chevrolet V8
- Jaguar Cars V8

== Past champions ==
The following is a list of past champions of the event:

Season	1ST - Club	2ND - Club	3RD - Club	Best Overseas Driver
2026	Jayden Ward - C	Scott Tennant - C	William Humphries - P	Rick Wobbes (NED) - 8th
2025	Josh Prentice - G	Ethan Rees - G	Scott Tennant - C	Tom Harris (UK) - 12th
2024	Jamie Hamilton - G	Trent James - P	Dylan Marshall - V	Charlie Sworder (UK) ?
2023	Ethan Rees - G	Peter Rees - G	Frankie Wainman Junior - UK	Frankie Wainman Junior(UK) - 3rd
2022	Jason Long - B	Peter Bengston - P	Mitch Vickery - K	N/A (Covid19)
2021	Jack Miers - P	Josh Prentice - G	Jayden Ward - C	N/A (Covid19)
2020	Keegan Levien - W	Jason Long - B	Nick Vallance - G	Frankie Wainman Junior(UK) - 6th
2019	Benji Sneddon - P	Thomas Stanaway - B	Jayden Ward - C	Lee Fairhurst(UK) - 10th
2018	Simon Joblin - P	Jordan Dare - P	Wayne Hemi - P	Frankie Wainman Junior(UK) - 6th
2017	Simon Joblin - P	Jayden Ward - P	Peter Bengston - P	Frankie Wainman Junior(UK) - 6th
2016	Scott Joblin - P	Adam Joblin - P	Bryce Steiner - R	Daniel van Spijker(NED) - 12th
2015	Bryce Steiner - R	Jordan Dare - P	Scott Joblin - P	Frankie Wainman Junior(UK) - 8th
2014	Peter Bengston - P	Frankie Wainman - UK	Asher Rees - P	Frankie Wainman Junior(UK) - 2nd
2013	Shane Penn - P	Phil Ogle - S	Shane Harwood - N	Daniel Wainman(UK) - 16th
2012	Andy McCabe - P	David Elsworth - R	Peter Bengston - P	Paul Harrison(UK) - 4th
2011	Peter Rees - P	Scott Joblin - P	Graeme Barr - P	Frankie Wainman Junior(UK) - 7th
2010	Scott Joblin - P	Joe Faram - B	Dale Robertson - R	Frankie Wainman Junior(UK) - 4th
2009	Frankie Wainman Junior - UK	Pat Westbury - R	Malcom Ngatai - C	Frankie Wainman Junior(UK) - 1st
2008	Peter Bengston - P	Scott Redfern - H	Roydon Collingwood - P	Frankie Wainman Junior(UK) - 4th
2007	Shane Penn - P	Dale Ewers - N	Frankie Wainman Junior - UK	Frankie Wainman Junior(UK) - 3rd
2006	Simon Joblin - P	Neville Stanaway - R	Darcy Hunter - R	Frankie Wainman Junior(UK) - 7th
2005	Darcy Hunter - R	Stan Hickey - R	Frankie Wainman Junior - UK	Frankie Wainman Junior(UK) - 3rd
2004	Gary Parkes - P	Stan Hickey - R	Lionel Penn - S	Murray Harrison(UK) - 6th
2003	Wayne Hemi - W	Nick Fowler - N	Frankie Wainman Junior - UK	Frankie Wainman Junior(UK) - 3rd
2002	Darcy Hunter - R	Craig Pierce - M	Neil McCoard - R	Frankie Wainman Junior(UK) - 14th
2001	Barry Podjursky - P	Brian Musgrove - W	Kelvin Grey - P	Alan Skayman(UK) - 10th
2000	Frankie Wainman Junior - UK	Kelvin Grey - P	Tony McLanachan - W	Frankie Wainman Junior(UK) - 1st
1999	Tony McLanachan - W	Rodney Wood - R	Craig Boote - N	Frankie Wainman Junior(UK) - 5th
1998	Tony Whittaker - N	Craig Pierce - A	Scott Miers - P	Frankie Wainman Junior(UK) - 11th
1997	Frankie Wainman Junior - UK	Barry Hunter - R	Dave Tennant - A	Frankie Wainman Junior(UK) - 1st
1996	Roydon Collingwood - S	Rowan Yandle - S	Daryl Uhlenberg - S	John Lund(UK) - 5th
1995	Roydon Collingwood - S	Barry Podjursky - S	Shane Penn - B	Peter Falding(UK) - 7th
1994	Ian Carlyle - M	Clark Proctor - M	Neville Stanaway - R	John Lund(UK) - 11th
1993	Bryce Penn - B	Shane Penn - B	Frank Van Vroonhoven - H	John Lund(UK) - 12th
1992	Greg Johnston - S	Lyall Rumney - R	Dave Evans - P	Stuart Smith Sr(UK) - 4th
1991	Barry Podjursky - S	Frank Van Vroonhoven - H	Gary Parkes - P	Bert Finnikin(UK) - 13th
1990	Paul Ulrich - S	Graeme Barr - S	Bryce Penn - B	Murray Harrison(UK) - 14th
1989	Paul Whitcombe - P	Bobert James - P	Gary Nickel - S	John Lund(UK) - 6th
1988	Dave Evans - P	Robin Wildbore - P/John Lund - UK/ Paul Ulrich - S	-	John Lund(UK) - 2nd
1987	Chris Elwell - UK	Brian McPhee - W	Norm Dempster - P	Chris Elwell(UK) - 1st

The following is a list of the "most wins" in the event:

Most Podiums By Club			Most podiums by a driver (3 or more)			Most title wins by driver			Most title wins by club			
Rank	Club	Podiums	Rank	Driver	Podiums	Rank	Driver	Titles	Rank	Club	Titles	
1	Palmerston North	36	1	Frankie Wainman Junior	7	1=	Frankie Wainman Junior	3	1	Palmerston North	17	
2	Rotorua	16	2=	Shane Penn	4	1=	Daniel Burmeister	4	2	United Kingdom	4	
3	Stratford	13	2=	Jayden Ward	4	2=	2=	Roydon Collingwood	2	3	Stratford	5
4	Overseas	9	2=	Scott Joblin	4	2=	Barry Podjursky	2	4	Rotorua	3	
5	Hawkes Bay	6	3=	Barry Podjursky	3	2=	Darcy Hunter	2	5	Wellington	2	
6	Wellington	5	3=	Darcy Hunter	3	2=	Shane Penn	2	6=	Hawkes Bay	1	
7=	Huntly	3	3=	Roydon Collingwood	3	2=	Peter Bengston	2	6=	Bay Park	1	
7=	Bay Park	3	3=	Simon Joblin	3	2=	Scott Joblin	2				
8=	Auckland	2										
8=	Nelson	2										
8=	Christchurch	2										
