= BriSCA Formula 1 Stock Cars National Points Championship =

The National Points Championship is a season-long competition for BriSCA Formula 1 Stock Cars. The winner is granted the honour of racing with a silver roof for the following season.

== History ==
The first season-long championship started in 1956. Drivers' scores at every stock car meeting were recorded to create the championship table. During the late 1990s, when Frankie Wainman Junior dominated, there was criticism that the National Points Championship was predictable and favoured drivers who had the money to race at as many meetings as possible. The National Series was created in 2002. Rather than the points accumulated over the entire season counting towards the winner, the National Series was competed for over 35 designated meetings. The season-long National Points Championship survived, but its importance was downgraded, and the privilege of racing with a silver roof for the following season was transferred from it to the National Series.

In 2009, the National Series was amended. This time, the top ten points-scoring drivers over the first two-thirds of the season were entered in the National Series Shootout, beginning with no points except for a small number of meeting attendance points. The drivers raced over ten designated Shootout rounds, with the points scored in them deciding the winner of the National Series. In 2010, the number of competing drivers was increased to twelve. From 2012, the National Series Shootout was rebranded the National Points Championship Shootout.

The most successful driver in National Points Championships and National Series is Frankie Wainman Junior, who has won fourteen. Other notable multiple winners include Stuart Smith (thirteen), John Lund (six), Fred Mitchell (three), Andy Smith (three) and Frankie Wainman (three).

== List of winners ==
Year	Winner	Second	Third
1956	Johnny Brise	Doug Wardropper	Harold Bosworth
1957	Fred Mitchell	Doug Wardropper	Allen Briggs
1958	Doug Wardropper	Fred Mitchell	Ken Freeman
1959	Fred Mitchell	Doug Wardropper	Aubrey Leighton
1960	Fred Mitchell	Ken Freeman	Johnny King
1961	Trevor Frost	Ken Freeman	Johnny King
1962	Alan Wardropper	Trevor Frost	Fred Mitchell
1963	Aubrey Leighton	Alan Wardropper	Trevor Frost
1964	Alan Wardropper	Nev Hughes	Trevor Frost
1965	Ellis Ford	Alan Wardropper	Fred Mitchell
1966	Ron Rogers	Ellis Ford	Willie Harrison
1967	Tony Neal	Ron Rogers	Ellis Ford
1968	Tony Neal	Jim Esau	George Ansell
1969	Stuart Smith	Ron Rogers	George Ansell
1970	Stuart Smith	Doug Cronshaw	Jim Esau
1971	Stuart Smith	Willie Harrison	Doug Cronshaw
1972	Stuart Smith	Mick Noden	Willie Harrison
1973	Stuart Smith	Willie Harrison	Doug Cronshaw
1974	Stuart Smith	Dave Chisholm	John Hillam
1975	Stuart Smith	Willie Harrison	Doug Cronshaw
1976	Stuart Smith	Willie Harrison	Frankie Wainman
1977	Stuart Smith	Frankie Wainman	Willie Harrison
1978	Stuart Smith	Frankie Wainman	Dave Hodgson
1979	Stuart Smith	Frankie Wainman	Len Wolfenden
1980	Stuart Smith	Frankie Wainman	Len Wolfenden
1981	Stuart Smith	Len Wolfenden	Frankie Wainman
1982	Mike Close	Frankie Wainman	John Lund
1983	Bert Finnikin	Mike Close	Len Wolfenden
1984	Frankie Wainman	John Lund	Dave Berresford
1985	Frankie Wainman	Bert Finnikin	Stuart Smith
1986	Frankie Wainman	John Lund	Bobby Burns
1987	John Lund	Frankie Wainman	Bert Finnikin
1988	John Lund	Frankie Wainman	Ray Tyldesley
1989	John Lund	Peter Falding	Ray Tyldesley
1990	John Lund	Bobby Burns	Paul Harrison
1991	John Lund	Peter Falding	Frankie Wainman Junior
1992	John Lund	Frankie Wainman Junior	Peter Falding
1993	Peter Falding	Frankie Wainman Junior	John Lund
1994	Frankie Wainman Junior	Peter Falding	John Lund
1995	Andy Smith	John Lund	Frankie Wainman Junior
1996	Frankie Wainman Junior	John Lund	Peter Falding
1997	Frankie Wainman Junior	John Lund	Andy Smith
1998	Frankie Wainman Junior	John Lund	Andy Smith
1999	Frankie Wainman Junior	Andy Smith	John Lund
2000	Frankie Wainman Junior	Andy Smith	Paul Harrison
2001	Frankie Wainman Junior	Rob Speak	Andy Smith
2002	Frankie Wainman Junior	Andy Smith	Paul Harrison
2003	Frankie Wainman Junior	Peter Falding	Gary Castell
2004	Frankie Wainman Junior	Paul Harrison	Stuart Smith Junior
2005	Frankie Wainman Junior	Mark Gilbank	Paul Harrison
2006	Andy Smith	Frankie Wainman Junior	Paul Harrison
2007	Frankie Wainman Junior	Andy Smith	Stuart Smith Junior
2008	Frankie Wainman Junior	Stuart Smith Junior	Andy Smith
2009	Stuart Smith Junior	Andy Smith	Frankie Wainman Junior
2010	Andy Smith	Craig Finnikin	Paul Hines
2011	Craig Finnikin	Frankie Wainman Junior	Dan Johnson
2012	Tom Harris	Frankie Wainman Junior	Craig Finnikin
2013	Ryan Harrison	Lee Fairhurst	Dan Johnson
2014	Rob Speak	Tom Harris	Mat Newson
2015	Dan Johnson	Rob Speak	Mat Newson
2016	Rob Speak	Nigel Green	Dan Johnson
2017	Stuart Smith Junior	Danny Wainman	Nigel Green
2018	Frankie Wainman Junior	Danny Wainman	Lee Fairhurst
2019	Tom Harris	Frankie Wainman Junior	Mat Newson
2020	Not held due to COVID-19 pandemic		
2021	Tom Harris	Ryan Harrison	Frankie Wainman Junior
2022	Tom Harris	Lee Fairhurst	Matt Newson
2023	Tom Harris	Matt Newson	Lee Fairhurst
2024	Tom Harris	Frankie Wainman Junior	Lee Fairhurst
2025	Tom Harris	Frankie Wainman Junior	Matt Newson
