= Odsal Stadium =

Sports stadium in Bradford, England

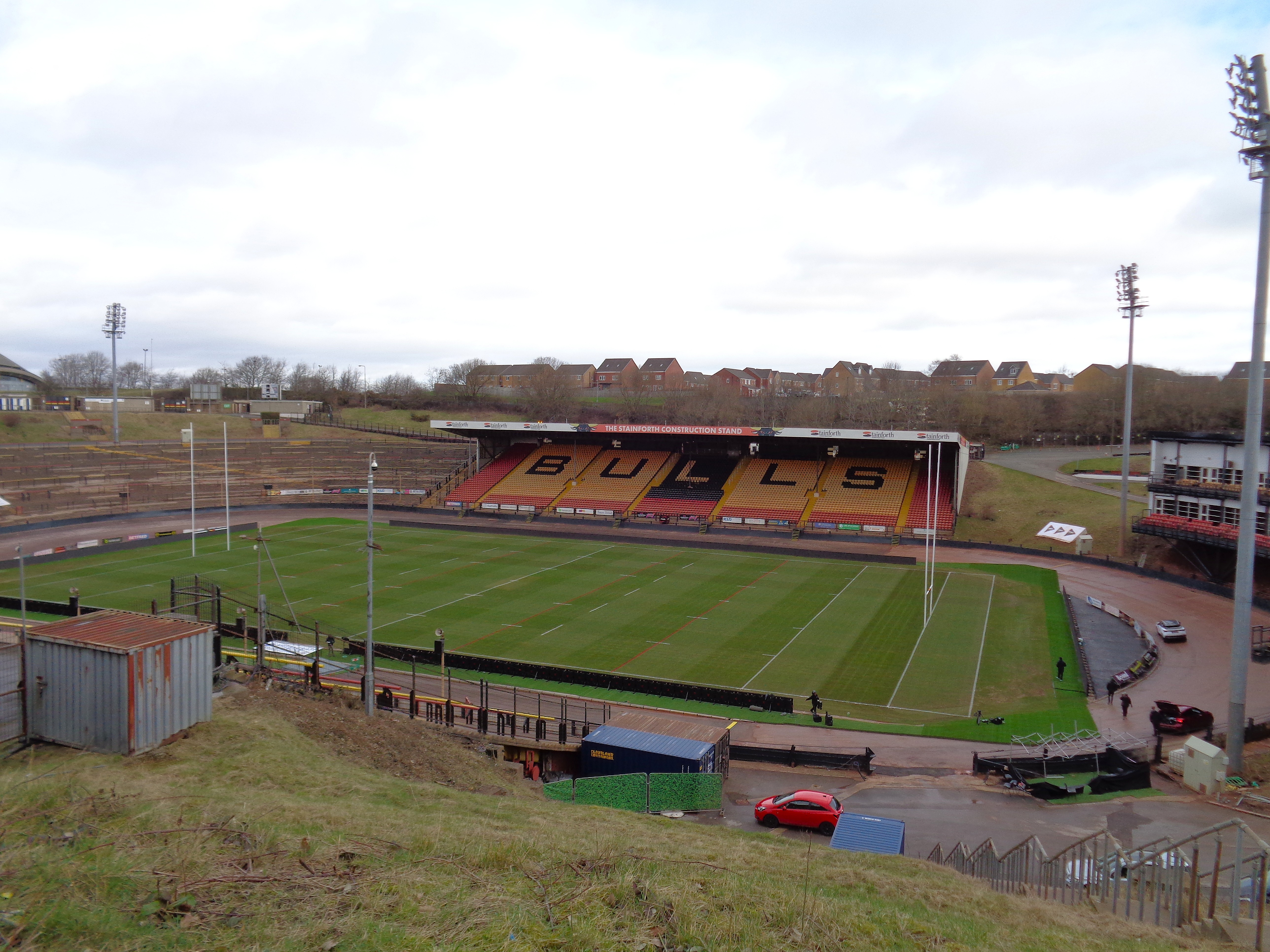
- Interactive map of Odsal Stadium
- Full name: Bartercard Odsal Stadium
- Location: Rooley Lane, Odsal, Bradford, West Yorkshire, England
- Coordinates: 53°45′54″N 1°45′25″W
- Owner: Bradford Bulls
- Operator: Bradford Bulls
- Capacity: 26,019
- Surface: Grass, Shale racing track
- Scoreboard: Manual
- Record attendance: All time 102,569 (Warrington vs Halifax, 5 May 1954); Super League; 24,020 (Bradford Bulls vs Leeds, 3 September 1999); Stock cars 38,000 (26 May 1954)
- Field size: 67.79 m × 111.74 m (222.4 ft × 366.6 ft)
- Public transit: Low Moor

Construction
- Opened: 1933
- Renovated: 1964, 1985, 2001–02

Tenants
- Rugby league Bradford Bulls (1934–2000; 2003–2019; 30 May 2021–present); Stock cars YorStox F1 & F2 stock cars (2021–2025); Association football Bradford City (1985–1986); Speedway; Bradford Dukes (1945–1997)

Website
- https://odsalstadium.co.uk

Odsal Stadium (known as Bartercard Odsal Stadium for sponsorship reasons) is a multipurpose stadium in Bradford, West Yorkshire, England. The stadium is currently the home of Bradford Bulls rugby league football club. The stadium, originally owned by Bradford City Council, had its leasehold purchased by the Rugby Football League (RFL) governing body in 2012 due to financial problems at the council. In 2025, the stadium was bought back from the RFL by the Bradford Bulls.

Previously, the stadium has also been used by Yorstox Stock Cars, hosting regular monthly meetings of BriSCA Formula 1 and Formula 2 Stock Cars between 2021 and 2025, the Bradford Dukes motorcycle speedway team, hosting the 1997 Speedway Grand Prix of Great Britain and the football team Bradford City for a temporary groundshare following the Valley Parade fire while their ground was rebuilt. Odsal Stadium has also historically hosted baseball, women's football, American football, basketball, kabaddi, show jumping, tennis, live music concerts, and international rugby league matches over the years.

The stadium's highest attendance was 102,569 in 1954 for the Warrington-Halifax Challenge Cup Final replay, and for a domestic, non-final, rugby league match, 69,429 at the third round Challenge Cup tie between Bradford Northern and Huddersfield in 1953.

== History ==
=== 1933–1935: Construction and opening ===
Formed in 1907, the Bradford Northern club had played at a number of venues, including the Greenfield Athletic Ground in Dudley Hill and Bowling Old Lane Cricket Club's ground in Birch Lane. By the early 1920s, however, Birch Lane's limitations were clear, and Northern began to seek another home. Precarious finances prevented the club form being able to take up an offer to develop land off Rooley Lane or to upgrade and move back to Greenfield, but in 1933, Bradford City Council gave them the opportunity to transform land at Odsal Top into their home ground. On 20 June 1933 the club therefore signed a ten-year deal on the site, which was to become the biggest stadium in England outside Wembley.

The site was a former quarry that was then being used as a landfill tip. Ernest Call M.B.E., the Director of Cleansing for Bradford City Council, devised a system of controlled tipping that saw 140,000 cartloads of household waste deposited to form the characteristic banking at Odsal. The club was to be responsible for boundary fencing, dressing rooms, and seated accommodation.

To be able to turf the pitch and other areas, a turf fund was put into place that raised a total of £900 to cover the work. A stand was erected at the cost of £2,000, which was paid for by the RFL. It held 1,500 on a mixture of benches and tip-up seats.

The ground was officially opened by Sir Joseph Taylor, President of Huddersfield, on 1 September 1934. His club went on to beat the hosts 31–16, Australian winger Ray Markham scoring four tries in front of an estimated 20,000. The clubhouse and dressing rooms were officially opened before a match against Hull F.C. on 2 February 1935. Contemporary pictures show that as late as August 1935 the banking on the Rooley Avenue side was still being created.

=== 1940–1979: Speedway and international rugby league ===
Under the instruction of Bradford Northern RFLC director Harry Hornby and local motorsport promoter Johnnie Hoskins, a sloping oval compacted dirt track was especially designed to surround the rugby pitch to allow professional speedway racing to take place at Odsal in 1945, the initial Bradford team known as the Odsal Boomerangs. In the post-Second World War years, speedway proved extremely popular with crowds of over 20,000 regularly attending meetings at Odsal, with the 1946 average for the first year of the National League after the war. The highest speedway attendance during this period came on 5 July 1947, when 47,050 fans saw the England national speedway team defeat Australia 65–43 in a Test match. This remains the largest-ever speedway crowd for Odsal Stadium.

During the Second World War, the lower floor of the clubhouse was also used as an Air Raid Precautions centre, and one of the dressing rooms was the map room. On 20 December 1947, the largest-ever attendance for an international test at Odsal was set when 42,685 saw England national rugby league team defeat New Zealand 25–9. The first floodlit rugby match in the North of England was held at Odsal in 1951. In September 1951, Council Engineer Ernest Wardley drew up a plan for a 92,000-capacity 'European' style stadium at a cost of £250,000. Eventually, £50,000 was spent on terracing the Rooley Avenue end in 1964, before the Wardley plan was officially dropped the following year.

After a disastrous 1960 season, the Panthers (previously the Odsal Boomerangs) left Odsal and in 1961 moved across town to the Greenfield Stadium, better known for greyhound racing. After the Panthers folded in 1962, motorcycle speedway would not return to Bradford for another ten years.

Speedway returned to Odsal when promoters Les Whaley, Mike Parker and Bill Bridgett moved the British League Division Two side Nelson Admirals to the stadium for the final eleven league meetings of the 1970 season, going on to adopt Bradford Northern as their name and red, black, and amber as their colors. Northern finished second in Division 2 in 1971, but from there results and attendances steadily declined, and the team folded after 1973.

The second test of the 1978 Ashes series was played at Odsal, with Great Britain defeating Australia before a crowd of 26,761. The Lions team that day featured what was called a "Dad's Army" front row with Jim Mills, Tony Fisher and Brian Lockwood all being over the age of 30.

=== 1980–1996: Bradford City and the return of speedway ===
The ground's clubhouse had to be refurbished when it was condemned in the mid-1980s. The social facilities were also upgraded at the same time.

Speedway returned to Odsal in 1985 after a ten-year absence when it was selected by the Fédération Internationale de Motocyclisme to host the 1985 World Final.

Following the Valley Parade fire of 1985, Bradford City A.F.C. played a handful of games at Leeds Road and Elland Road while Valley Parade was being rebuilt. On 23 September 1985, a Football League delegation visited Odsal to evaluate its fitness to host City's home games. Segregation fences were erected on the old Main Stand side and 1,000 uncovered seats were bolted onto the terracing; it was planned to install 7,000 in the future. A further £1 million was spent to conform with new safety standards, bringing the total spent on Odsal to £3.5 million; new boundary walls, turnstiles, exit gates, a bus layby in Rooley Avenue and access road were added. Odsal played host to Bradford City's Second Division home matches until December 1986.

Like most British stadia, Odsal had its capacity substantially reduced by the safety measures introduced in the 1990s following the Hillsborough disaster and the findings of the Taylor Report.

=== 1996–2019: Super League and Championship eras ===
At the dawn of the Super League era in 1996, Bradford Northern, now renamed the Bradford Bulls, wanted to attract new sponsors but had poor and outdated hospitality suites. In 2000, the club announced plans to build hospitality suites at the South Bank of the stadium, which would mean building on the track and garages around the pitch, effectively ending speedway's association with Bradford. Construction started in 2001 and was completed in 2002, with Bradford Bulls playing two seasons at Valley Parade.

Plans were put in place in 2009 to redevelop the stadium and the Richard Dunn Leisure Centre opposite as part of the Odsal Sports Village complex; two proposals, both incorporating the stadium and leisure centre redevelopments as well as a new 120-bed hotel, would have seen either a new all-seater stadium with capacity for 18,000 developed by raising the pitch level by 15 metres (49 ft) or the existing stadium renovated with a new seated east stand and cantilevered roof. These plans never came to fruition after funding for the scheme was withdrawn by Bradford City Council and used to build two new special schools.

In 2012, Bradford Bulls encountered severe financial difficulties, causing the RFL to step in and purchase the leasehold to Odsal Stadium. Since being relegated to the RFL Championship in 2014, their problems intensified. In early 2017 the Bulls were formally liquidated and a new phoenix club was formed by Andrew Chalmers, who announced plans to redevelop Odsal into a venue fit for Super League and international rugby league, however, like previous plans, they were shelved.

Nearby association football club Bradford (Park Avenue) A.F.C., whose current home venue is the Bradford City Council-owned football ground Horsfall Stadium had on several occasions discussed relocating to Odsal, most recently in 2018, however they repeatedly decided against such a move, leaving Odsal as a single-rent, single-use stadium.

=== 2019–2021: Bulls leave Odsal Stadium ===
Due to the club's ongoing precarious financial situation and increasing running costs at the stadium, including the £72,000 rent payable to the RFL, the Bradford Bulls made the decision to leave Odsal for a groundshare with Dewsbury Rams at Crown Flatt to ensure the club's survival. On 1 September 2019, the club played what was believed to be their last home match at Odsal after 85 years.

=== 2021–present: Return of stock cars and the Bulls ===
Talks with the RFL were ongoing during the club's absence from Odsal Stadium. Two years later in 2021, they agreed a return to the stadium as a co-tenant with stock car promoters YorStox (formerly StarTrax). The shale motorsport racing track was restored for the return of regular professional BriSCA Formula 1 and Formula 2 stock car meetings, which resulted in the reintroduction of removable pitch corners and a narrowing of the rugby pitch. Despite the resultant changes to the pitch rendering it beneath minimum standards for professional rugby league, the sport's governing body allowed the Bulls to return to their former home.

On 30 August 2025, following a Bradford Bulls Championship fixture against Toulouse Olympique, a small fire broke out in a hospitality area within the South Bank, causing the evacuation of the stadium and the callout of firefighters but resulting in no injuries.

The condition of Odsal became controversial when it was announced that the Bradford Bulls would be returning to the Super League in 2026, with Leigh Leopards coach Adrian Lam calling the pitch a "shitbox" and stating he was "not looking forward to going there, but I'm looking forward to [the Bulls] being part of the competition". Ahead of the start of the season, stock car racing was discontinued at Odsal as part of a series of ground improvements, which included the installation of new floodlights and LED advertising boards, a repainting of the South Bank hospitality suites, a new big screen replacing one that had been damaged by high winds a year prior, and astroturfing around the edges of the 88 m × 55 m (289 ft × 180 ft) pitch, the smallest pitch in the Super League permitted by RFL regulations. On 4 May 2026, the Bradford Bulls announced it had ended a 20 year lease agreement with stock car racing promoters Odsal Motor Sports, bringing an end to stock car racing at Odsal once again.

== Current usage ==
=== Rugby league ===
Rugby league has featured at Odsal Stadium since it opened on 1 September 1934 when Huddersfield beat Bradford Northern 31 points to 16; Northern were later renamed the Bradford Bulls in 1996 at the beginning of Super League. Besides club rugby, Odsal has hosted various international fixtures including test matches, tour games and Rugby League World / European Cup fixtures, some of which involved Bradford teams facing international opposition, the results of which are as follows:

==== Test matches ====
Date	Winners	Score	Runners-up	Competition	Attendance
29 January 1938	Wales	7–6	England	1938 European Rugby League Championship	8,637
23 December 1939	Wales	16–3	England		15,257
18 October 1941	England	9–9	Wales		4,339
20 December 1947	Great Britain	25–9	New Zealand	1947 England vs New Zealand series	42,685
29 January 1949	Great Britain	23–9	Australia	1948–49 Ashes series	36,294
6 October 1951	Great Britain	21–15	New Zealand	1951 Great Britain vs New Zealand series	37,475
7 December 1951	New Zealand	15–3	Wales		8,568
13 December 1952	Australia	27–7	Great Britain	1952 Ashes series	30,509
7 October 1953	Other Nationalities	30–5	Wales 30–5	1953–54 European Rugby League Championship	14,646
7 November 1953	England	7–5	France		10,659
12 November 1955	Great Britain	27–12	New Zealand	1955 Great Britain vs New Zealand series	24,443
11 April 1956	Great Britain	18–10	France		10,453
1 December 1956	Australia	22–9	Great Britain	1956 Ashes series	23,634
24 September 1960	Great Britain	23–8	New Zealand	1960 Rugby League World Cup	20,577
8 October 1960	Great Britain	10–3	Australia	1960 Rugby League World Cup	32,773
21 October 1961	Great Britain	23–10	New Zealand	1961 Great Britain vs New Zealand series	19,980
23 October 1965	Great Britain	15–9	New Zealand	1965 Great Britain vs New Zealand series	15,849
2 March 1968	Great Britain	19–8	France		14,196
1 November 1970	France	17–15	Australia	1970 Rugby League World Cup	6,654
2 March 1972	Great Britain	45–10	France		7,313
25 November 1975	England	27–12	New Zealand	1975 Rugby League World Cup	5,507
5 November 1978	Great Britain	18–14	Australia	1978 Ashes series	26,761
2 November 1980	New Zealand	12–8	Great Britain	1980 Great Britain vs New Zealand series	10,946
2 November 2003	England	102–0	Russia	2003 European Nations Cup	1,376

==== Tour matches ====
Date	Winners	Score	Runners-up	Competition	Attendance
6 October 1937	Australia	8–4	Yorkshire	1937–38 Kangaroo tour	7,570
27 October 1937	Australia	19–6	Bradford Northern	1937–38 Kangaroo tour	5,748
10 November 1948	Australia	21–7	Bradford Northern	1948–49 Kangaroo tour	13,287
8 October 1952	Australia	20–6	Bradford Northern	1952–53 Kangaroo tour	29,287
24 October 1956	Australia	23–11	Bradford Northern	1956–57 Kangaroo tour	2,743
4 November 1959	Australia	29–8	Bradford Northern	1959–60 Kangaroo tour	4,126
2 December 1967	Australia	7–3	Bradford Northern	1967–68 Kangaroo tour	14,173
19 November 1972	Australia	29–16	Bradford Northern	1972 Australian Rugby League World Cup tour	2,820
28 October 1973	Australia	50–14	Bradford Northern	1973 Kangaroo tour	5,667
8 October 1978	Australia	21–11	Bradford Northern	1978 Kangaroo tour	15,755
14 October 1980	Bradford Northern	15–10	New Zealand	1980 New Zealand Kiwis tour	4,553
7 November 1982	Australia	13–6	Bradford Northern	1982 Kangaroo tour	10,506
18 November 1986	Australia	38–0	Bradford Northern	1986 Kangaroo tour	10,663
11 October 1989	New Zealand	26–8	Bradford Northern	1989 New Zealand Kiwis tour	
5 October 1993	Bradford Northern	17–10	New Zealand	1993 New Zealand Kiwis tour	
13 November 1994	Australia	40–0	Bradford Northern	1994 Kangaroo tour	9,080

=== Non-sporting activities ===
Odsal hosts occasional and regular activities outside of sports, which include live music events and festivals. In 2022, the Bradford Dance Festival took place at the stadium, headlined by DJ and rapper Tom Zanetti. Other events which take place at Odsal include talks, lectures, business conferences, monthly fundraising car boot sales, religious and community events, and annual bonfire and monster truck events, with the function suites available for hire. In 2023, Bradford Bulls became the first rugby league club in England to host an Iftar event, held in a South Bank hospitality suite.

== Past usage ==
=== Stock car racing ===
Odsal Stadium has hosted professional stock cars events since the sport arrived in England. The sport originated in the early 1950s at the Buffalo Stadium in Paris, France, using cars based upon the design of early American NASCAR vehicles, and the first British meeting took place on Good Friday on 16 April 1954 at New Cross Stadium in South East London. After two further meetings at New Cross, Odsal hosted the UK's fourth stock car event featuring V8 engine cars on Wednesday 26 May 1954 with a crowd of 38,000 spectators.

In the 1970s, stock car meetings happened on Saturdays, sometimes taking place 24 hours before a rugby league match on the following Sunday, which meant ground conversions had to be carried out expediently. Concerned about the survival of stock cars at Odsal, co-promoter Barry Gomersall introduced BriSCA Formula Two stock cars which were popular at Southern tracks. In June 1976, to further boost attendance, Gomersall, a former wrestler, added open-air wrestling to the bill, featuring himself and professional wrestler Jackie Pallo.

Originally shale, the Odsal motorsport track was tarmacked over in 1977 by Stuart Bamforth, although shale was to return in 1985 to accommodate the Speedway World Final. The temporary relocation of Bradford City A.F.C. following the Bradford City stadium fire resulted in a pause of stock car racing at Odsal in 1986, however the sport returned the following year. Odsal, along with Belle Vue in Manchester, Coventry, Long Eaton and Northampton were at the time the main national BriSCA tracks. Promoter Steve Rees took over the management of the sport at the stadium in 1996, aiming to boost its status, however a year later in 1997, the RFL chose to cancel the venue's multi-use at the start of the Super League, a decision which meant the abandonment of both stock cars and speedway at Odsal, the speedway pits area becoming an executive box block, until the shale track's eventual return in 2021 when Steve Rees successfully renegotiated the return of regular motorsports with the RFL and Bradford City Council.

Steve Rees's Lytham St Annes-based Startrax handed over the management to Buxton-based promotions company Yorstox, run by Derbyshire-based businessmen Russell Andrew and Graeme Robson, who also manage stock car racing facilities at Owlerton Stadium in Sheffield. Motorsports successfully returned to Odsal Stadium on 22 May 2021 for the first time in 23 years, the stadium hosting the national banger Stan Woods Memorial for pre-1975 cars, an event witnessed by 4,000 fans. Since September 2021, the stadium has hosted both BriSCA Formula 1 and BriSCA Formula 2 stock car meetings, including the BriSCA F1 World Championships, with drivers participating from across Europe, and hosted regular monthly stock car meetings and banger racing on its restored flattened shale track until 2026, when no meetings were scheduled for the year coinciding with Bradford Bulls' return to the Super League; a 20 year lease to hold stock car racing was terminated early by the Bulls on 4 May 2026.

==== BriSCA F1 World Championship results at Odsal Stadium ====
Year	Winner	Second	Third	Venue
1981	Len Wolfenden	Brian Powles	Mike Close	Odsal Stadium, Bradford
1985	Stuart Smith	Len Wolfenden	Bert Finnikin	Odsal Stadium, Bradford
1990	Bert Finnikin	Dave Berresford	John Lund	Odsal Stadium, Bradford
1992	John Lund	Bobby Burns	Peter Falding	Odsal Stadium, Bradford
1994	Andy Smith	Kev Smith	Dave Berresford	Odsal Stadium, Bradford
1997	John Lund	Frankie Wainman Junior	Peter Falding	Odsal Stadium, Bradford
2021	Tom Harris	Lee Fairhurst	Paul Harrison	Odsal Stadium, Bradford

=== Speedway ===
Speedway first took place at Odsal Stadium on 23 June 1945. Prior to that, in 1936, two years after the venue opened, the first foundations of motorsport were laid in Bradford when the Bradford and District Motor Club ran a mountain grass track event using the embankment at the north end of the stadium, the turf reported to have been badly cut up afterwards.

The director of the rugby league Club, Harry Hornby collaborated with local event promoter Johnnie Hoskins to bring speedway to the venue, the resultant 390 yards (360 m) oval circuit designed and built around the rugby pitch utilised for both motorcycle speedway and stock car racing. In 1948, a pioneering three feet in width concrete starting gate platform was also constructed at Odsal which was believed to have been the first of its kind used in United Kingdom speedway events.

The original Bradford team competing at Odsal were known as the Bradford Boomerangs. After finishing at the bottom of the National League in 1948 and 1949, the Boomerangs folded and were replaced in 1950 by the Odsal Tudors. Despite the name change, fortunes remained the same with the Tudors finishing on the bottom of the NL ladder in 1951. In 1959 the Tudors dropped the Odsal name and were renamed the Bradford Tudors.

In 1960, the Bradford Tudors renamed themselves the Bradford Panthers. After a disastrous 1960 season, the Panthers left Odsal and in 1961 moved across town to the Greenfield Stadium, better known for greyhound racing. After the Panthers folded in 1962, Motorcycle Speedway would not return to Bradford for another 10 years.

Speedway returned to Odsal when promoters Les Whaley, Mike Parker and Bill Bridgett moved the British League Division Two side Nelson Admirals to the stadium for the final eleven league meetings of the 1970 season. The Admirals adopted the Bradford Northern name and colours, though the move was met with opposition from the nearby Halifax Dukes. Northern would finish second in Division Two in 1971, but from there results and attendances steadily declined and the team folded in 1973.

The following year, Bradford Barons were formed, but they were also short lived and only lasted the years 1974 and 1975. Speedway would once again not return to Bradford for another 10 years.

Speedway returned to Odsal in 1985 when it was selected by the FIM to host the 1985 World Final, the first time the Final in England would not be held at Wembley Stadium. In the three years after the 1981 World Final at Wembley, international speedway's home in Great Britain had been the White City Stadium in London. However, with the closure of White City in 1985 a new home would be needed and the 30,000 capacity Odsal was chosen. A capacity crowd at the 1985 World Final saw a titanic fight between Denmark's defending World Champion Erik Gundersen, his fellow countryman Hans Nielsen, and American rider Sam Ermolenko. The trio all finished the meeting on 13 points each which saw a three-way runoff for the top 3 placings with Gundersen winning from Nielsen and Ermolenko. Just a month prior to the World Final, Odsal also hosted the Overseas Final as part of the World Final qualifications. That meeting saw two riders finish at the top on 14 points, American Shawn Moran and English favourite, Halifax Dukes rider Kenny Carter. Moran would defeat Carter in the runoff for the Overseas title.

In March 1986, Odsal opened its doors to British League action for the first time since the 1950s after the Halifax Dukes were offered a new home track. The new 'Bradford Dukes' team would in later years include World Champions Gary Havelock and Mark Loram, multiple British and Long Track World Champions Simon Wigg and Kelvin Tatum, and dual Australian Champion Glenn Doyle. However, the club suffered the tragic loss of Kenny Carter who died in murder/suicide after shooting his wife and then himself at their home in May 1986.

Odsal Stadium hosted its second World Final in 1990. Swedish rider Per Jonsson won his only World Championship when he defeated Shawn Moran in a runoff after both had finished the meeting on 13 points. Moran was later stripped of his silver medal by the FIM after he had tested positive to a drug test taken three months earlier at the Overseas Final in Coventry. Moran claimed that the drug he took was a pain killer prescribed by a doctor in Sweden, but the FIM stood firm. They also did not upgrade the standings and the official records show no second place rider. Young Australian rider Todd Wiltshire riding in his first World Final surprised many by finishing in third place with 12 points.

From 1987, Bradford speedway then enjoyed its greatest period of success, winning eight trophies until the club's closure in 1997 when despite winning the Elite League, the club folded for the third time.

Odsal Stadium hosted the 1997 Speedway Grand Prix of Great Britain. Danish rider Brian Andersen won the Grand Prix from America's reigning World Champion Billy Hamill, with Swede Jimmy Nilsen finishing third in the Final. Bradford Dukes rider Mark Loram finished 4th in the Final. Loram would later go on to be the 2000 World Champion after winning the Speedway Grand Prix series that year.

==== Individual World Championship ====
Year	Winners	Points
1985	(Denmark) Erik Gundersen	13+3pts
1990	(Sweden) Per Jonsson	13+3pts

==== World Pairs Championship ====
Year	Winners	Points
1988	Denmark (Hans Nielsen / Erik Gundersen)	45pts

==== World Team Cup ====
Year	Winners	Points
1986	Denmark (Erik Gundersen / Hans Nielsen / Tommy Knudsen / Jan O. Pedersen / John Jørgensen)	130pts
1989	England (Jeremy Doncaster / Kelvin Tatum / Paul Thorp / Simon Wigg / Simon Cross)	48pts

* Odsal hosted the third of three rounds in the Final.

==== Speedway Grand Prix ====
Year	Winners
1997 Speedway Grand Prix of Great Britain	(Denmark) Brian Andersen

=== American football ===
Several American football games were played at Odsal in 1988 when the Leeds Cougars home ground, McLaren Field in Bramley, was being reseeded. Against the Glasgow Lions, the Cougars won 15–12 after a last minute field-goal by linebacker Glenn Stowe with just twenty seconds of time remaining. In the other Odsal fixture against the Fylde Falcons, the Cougars were narrowly defeated 17–8.

Following the popularity of these two games, good turnouts reported at the natural bowl of Odsal, the Leeds Cougars made Odsal their home-base for the entire 1989 season. Victories included a 56–22 win against the Leicester Panthers, 26–12 against the Nottingham Hoods, a 63–30 win against the Northampton Stormbringers, and a 20–14 victory against the conference leaders the Birmingham Bulls.

=== Women's football ===
In August 1939, despite an FA ban on women's football, an international women's match took place at Odsal featuring Preston Ladies versus an all-star Belgian women's team. The match was attended by the Lord Mayor and local football dignitaries including the directors of Bradford City and Bradford Park Avenue. David Steele, manager of Bradford Park Avenue was the referee and two Avenue players, Bob Danskin and Chick Farr were linesmen.

=== Showjumping ===
Equestrian events took place at Odsal Stadium in 1957 and again in 1958. The top prize of £1,000 was available to the winner, plus trophies for the winner and runner up. Thirty tonnes of river sand was spread across the pitch to give the horses a softer landing when jumping the fences. Ted Williams was the winner of the Airedale Stakes showjumping competition. An expected 20,000 spectators on the second and final day never materialised, just 6,000 people attending, which resulted in the event making a loss of £1,700. Despite this, showjumping returned the following year, before being permanently cancelled by Bradford Northern's directors as unprofitable, the event replaced by a series of miniature car races in 1959.

=== Baseball ===
Baseball became popular in the 1930s, played in stadiums throughout Northern England until the outbreak of Second World War, after which it faded. Gambling was permitted on the games, and pools magnate Sir John Moores from Littlewoods sponsored and provided kit to the newly launched North of England League, baseball providing rugby league and football clubs with off-season summer income. In the inaugural competition hosted in 1935, two years after Odsal Stadium opened, Bradford Northern RLFC entered a baseball team also called Bradford Northern who came second in the league to the champions Oldham Greyhounds with ten wins out of fourteen. Other nearby baseball clubs in Bradford included the City Sox and the Greenfield Giants, who were based two miles away at the Greenfield Stadium, Bradford at Dudley Hill.

=== Tennis ===
In 1939, Odsal Stadium played host to the British Isles and Western Europe tour of the leading men's tennis players of the day: Don Budge, Bill Tilden, Ellsworth Vines, and Lester Stoefen. A film capturing this event was created by local filmmaker, C. H. Wood, which additionally features a rugby league sevens cup semi final that took place that same year.

=== Other sporting events ===
Other sports which have been played at Odsal since opening include basketball and kabaddi.

In 2017, an exhibition field hockey match took place at Odsal as the stadium stood in for Wembley Stadium for the production of the 2018 Indian film Gold, featuring actor Akshay Kumar portraying the story of India's men's hockey team winning its first Olympic gold medal after partition, defeating the Great British team 4–0 at the 1948 Summer Olympics.

== Layout ==
The stadium is unusual for UK stadia, being a sunken bowl featuring a grass pitch surrounded by an oval shale motorsports track.

=== Rooley Avenue End ===
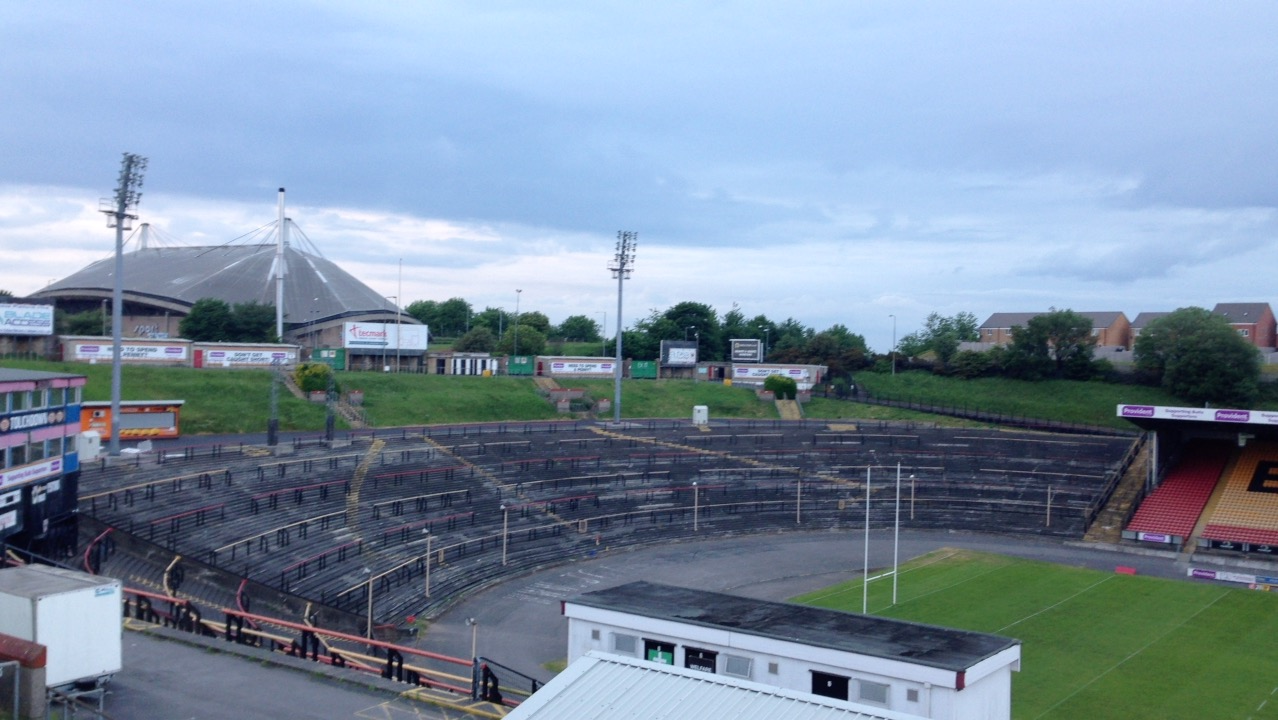
Rooley Avenue End

Capacity- 7,290 (standing)
The Rooley Avenue End is at the northern end of the stadium. It is open terracing and is where the big screen is erected for televised games. The stand has turnstiles that back onto Rooley Avenue.

=== East Stand ===
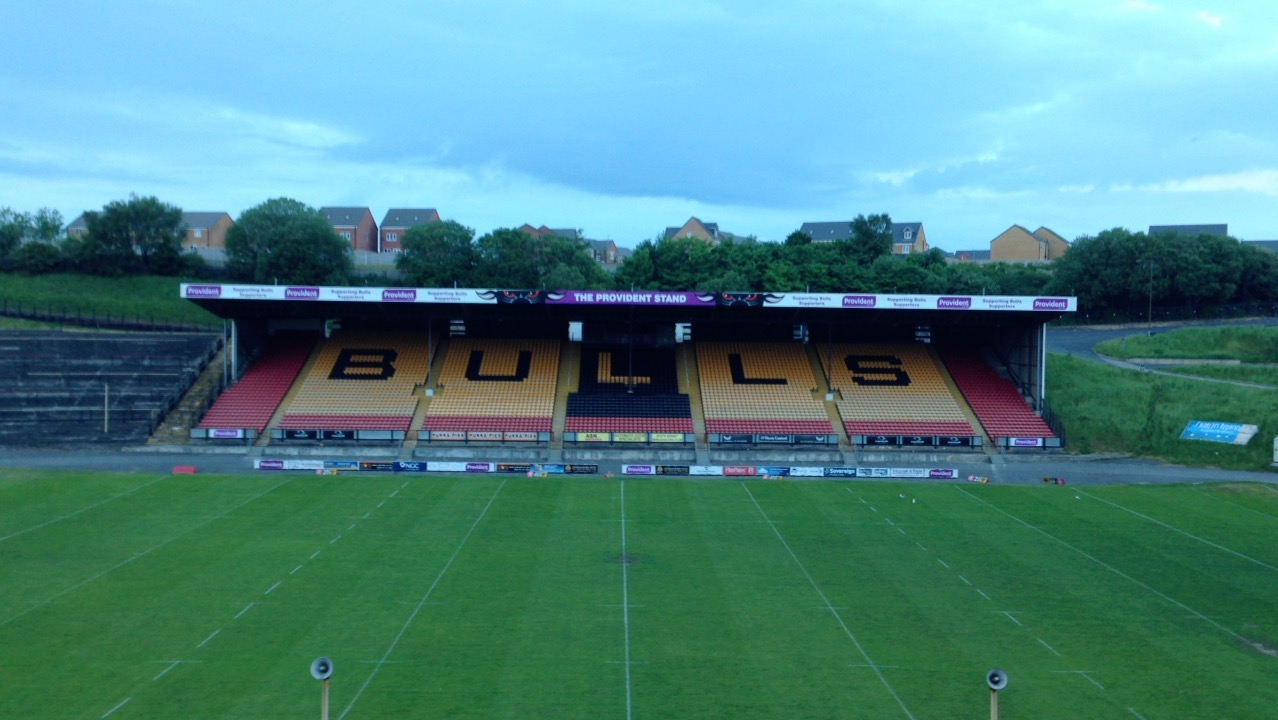
East Stand

Capacity- 4,890 (seating)
The East Stand is the only part of the ground that is covered and has seating. The stand runs parallel to the pitch and has "BULLS" spelt out on the seats. The stand houses home supporters and most season ticket holders as well as the press and some executive seats. There are also bars and toilets at the top of the stand.

=== South Bank ===
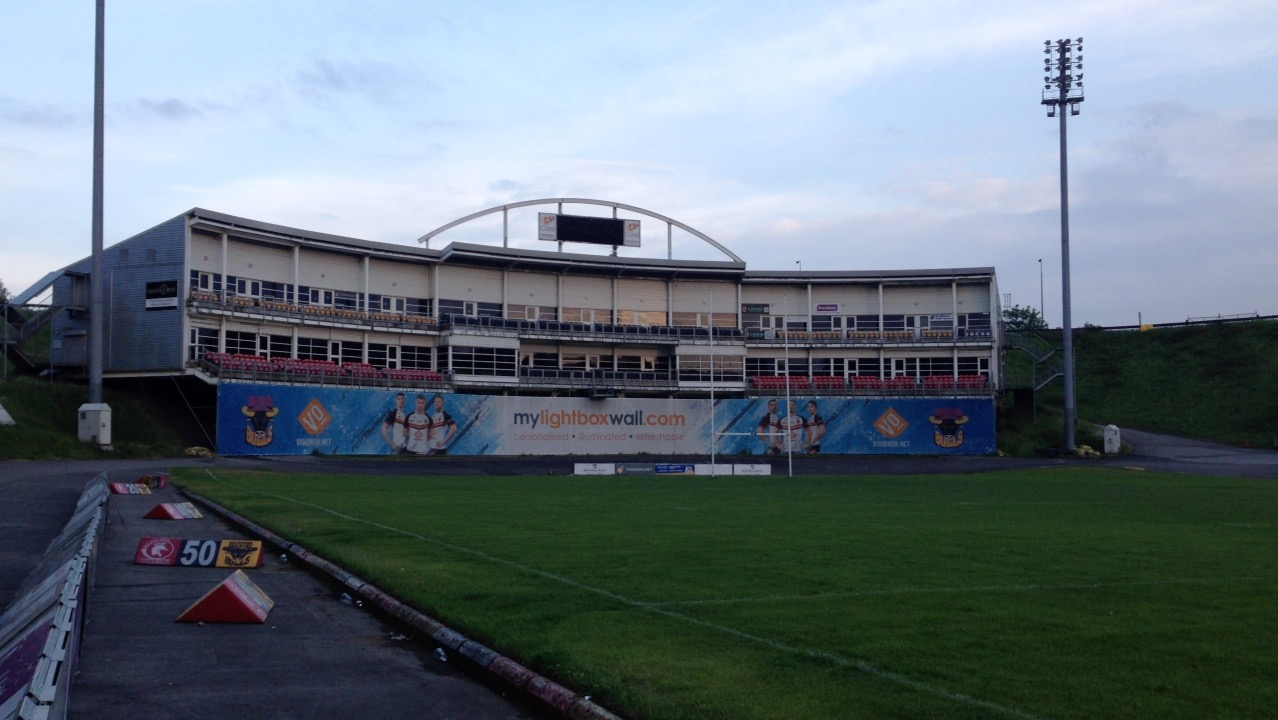
South Bank hospitality stand

Capacity- 620 (seating)
The South Bank is the stadium's commercial hospitality stand and the most recently built structure, having been completed in 2002. It has two levels, each containing a banqueting suite and seats looking out onto the pitch. Speedway was forced to end its association with Odsal after the hospitality building was built.

=== West Stand ===
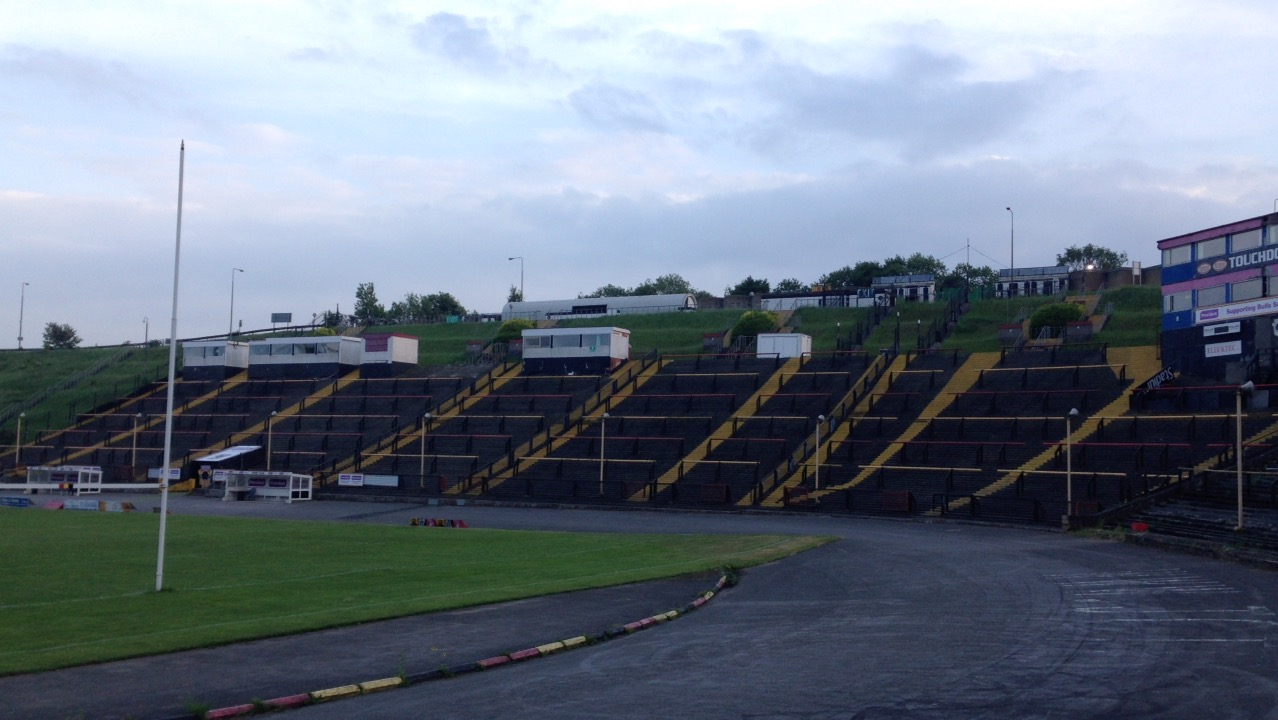
West Stand

Capacity- 9,309 (standing)
The West Stand is uncovered terracing and houses the players changing rooms and tunnel as well as TV gantry at the top of the stand. The supporters' bar is in the north-west corner of the stand which also houses a manual scoreboard and clock. At the top of the stand, on ground level with Rooley Avenue, is the car park and club shop and ticket office. There are a few hospitality boxes at the top of the stand, but these have not been used since the construction of the South Bank.

=== Grass pitch ===
The pitch at Odsal has a distinctive concave contour, with the corners behind the try-line noticeably sloping up towards the stands, due to the stadium hosting stock cars and previously speedway; the corners of the pitch can be removed to allow full use of the track. When stock cars and speedway departed Odsal, the corners became semi-permanent and were not as pronounced as they once were, however since the successful return of stock cars and banger racing in 2021 and the associated re-addition of a sloping shale track, significant removable sloping corner pieces have returned. The pitch has also been narrowed by several meters to accommodate the motorsports racing track.

=== Motorsports track ===
There has been a specialist oval racing track at Odsal in-place for motorcycle speedway and later, stock cars, since 1945. Implemented by Bradford Northern rugby director Harry Hornby and motorsports promoter Johnnie Hoskins, the original surface surrounding the rugby pitch was an especially designed sloping compacted dirt track. Over the decades, the shape of the track has remained the same, although the surface has alternated between dirt, shale and tarmac, dependent upon the stadium's usage at the time. When speedway ceased in 1977, the shale track was tarmacked over by Stuart Bamforth, stock cars continuing to race on the tarmac surface, shale later returning for the 1985 Speedway World Final.

The track remained shale until motorsports were forced to leave in Odsal in 1997, during which time the Bradford Dukes were crowned Elite Speedway Champions, ending the stadium's long association with car and motorbike racing. Assuming motorsport would not return, in 1990, the shale was relocated to create a new racing track in Somerset.

The remaining track underlay was reduced in width and tarmacked over, expanding the width of the pitch while leaving the track in a state of cracked disrepair until stock car promoter Steve Rees negotiated a change of heart from the RFL who permitted competitive motorsports to return. Although speedway failed to make a comeback as the media suggested may happen, under the management of Rees's Startrax, stock cars and banger racing successfully made a comeback the following year, enabling the Bradford Bulls to return home from exile.

7,000 fans attended the F1 World Final in August 2021, however a rain-drenched end of term 'firework spectacular' later that year exposed critical drainage problems which required urgent attention.

== Sponsorship ==
For two periods between 2006 and 2017 the ground officially carried the name of the Bradford Bulls' principle sponsor. From 2006 until 2010 it was referred to as the Grattan Stadium, Odsal due to sponsorship from retail company Grattan. From 2013 until 2017 it was referred to as the Provident Stadium, the sponsors being Provident Financial.

In March 2024, the Bulls confirmed trading exchange company Bartercard would assume the naming rights to Odsal, with the stadium known as Bartercard Odsal Stadium.

== Attendance records ==
- All-time record:

102,569 – 1954 Challenge Cup Final replay – Halifax vs. Warrington, 5 May 1954.

  - (World record rugby league attendance, stood until 6 March 1999)
- Super League record:

24,020 – Bradford vs. Leeds, 3 September 1999.

- International record:

42,685 – (United Kingdom) Great Britain vs. New Zealand, 20 December 1947

- World Cup record:

32,773 – (United Kingdom) Great Britain vs. Australia, 8 October 1960

- Speedway record:

47,050 – England vs. Australia, 5 July 1947

- Stock Cars record:

38,000 Wednesday 26 May 1954

== Bibliography ==
- Delaney, Trevor (1991). The Grounds Of Rugby League. Keighley: Trevor R. Delaney. ISBN 0-9509-9822-2.
