= Paul Hines (racing driver) =

English stock car racing driver

- Nationality: (United Kingdom) British
- Born: 3 December 1980 (age 45) Hinckley, Leicestershire, England

BriSCA Formula 1 Stock Cars career
- Debut season: 2002
- Car number: 259

Previous series
- V8 Hotstox

Championship titles
- 2005 2010 2010 2025: European Championship; British Championship; World Masters; British Championship

Paul Hines (born 3 December 1980) is a BriSCA Formula 1 Stock Cars racing driver from Hinckley, Leicestershire who races under number 259.

== Biography ==
Hines first started racing in V8 Hotstox. He switched to BriSCA F1 in 2002, debuting in a borrowed car at Skegness Stadium on 14 July. He bought his first car to race the following season, and worked his way through the grades to finish 18th in the National Points Championship.

His first major championship success came in 2005, when he won the European Championship at Northampton. He won the British Championship at Skegness in 2010. In 2011, he won a World Championship Semi-Final at Belle Vue and started the World Championship Final at Northampton from pole position. He finished the World Final in fourth place.

Hines was one of the drivers featured in the 2010 BBC documentary series Gears and Tears. He has also appeared in print in a number of different stock car publications. He wrote a V8 Hotstox column in the early 2000s for Stock Car Magazine and has written a column for Oval Racing News. He also contributed the foreword to a 2011 biography of BriSCA F1 driver John Lund.

== Honours ==
- European Champion : 2005
- British Champion : 2010, 2025
- World Masters : 2010
- World Semi Final winner : 2011
- Wilf Blundell memorial winner : 2004, 2011, 2012

As of November 2019, Paul has 82 race wins to his name including 21 Final wins
