= V8 Hotstox =

British stock car racing formula

Motor racing formula
- Category: Single seaters
- Country or region: United Kingdom
- Inaugural season: 1984
- Current champions: Thomas Brighton (329) (World); Thomas Brighton (329) (National Points); Thomas Rogers (277) (British); Tom Dunne (171) (European)

V8 Hotstox is a British stock car racing formula that races on British short oval racing circuits. Drivers are affiliated to the British Stock Car Racing Association (BriSCA). V8 Hotstox have also previously been known as V8 Stock Cars.

== Hotstox racing ==
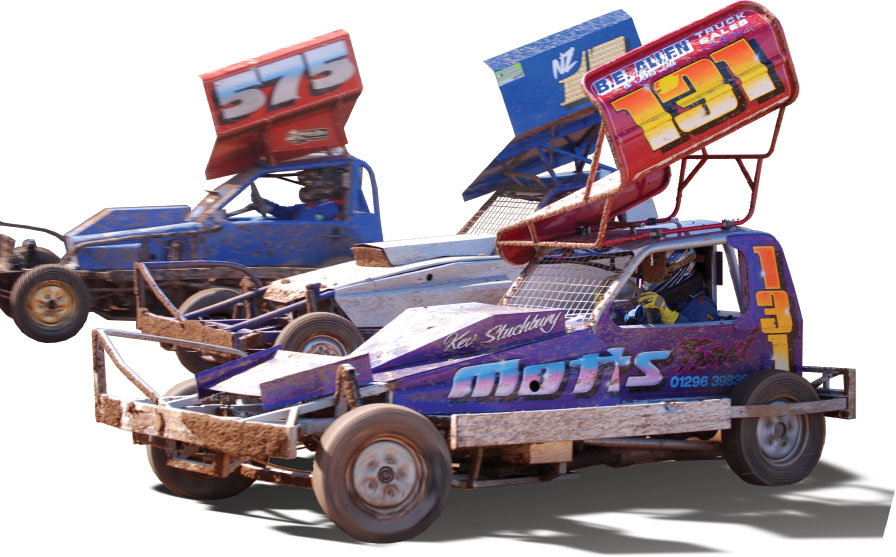
Kevin Stuchbury's 2007 World final winning car at King's Lynn en route to the Championship

Hotstox race at various venues in the UK. The tracks feature different surfaces such as shale, tarmac and concrete. The tracks all feature two straights and two turns to form an oval. The oval is surrounded by a safety barrier constructed of Armco, concrete, steel or posts and wires. Races vary in length with heats generally being 16 laps and final's 20. Each meeting consists of 2 or 3 heats plus a final and sometimes an all-comers race often called a Grand National.

The field of cars is split into 5 groups according to experience and points. Novices are graded 'White' and must have a white roof. The grades ascend as more points are scored, the next grade is Yellow followed by Blue, Red and Super Star grade. The Super Star grade have red roofs with amber flashing lights and are the most experienced drivers. Super Stars must start each race (aside from special championships) at the back of the field. Novices (White tops) start at the front followed by each grade.

Drivers may use force to pass the car in front to gain position. The winner is the first driver to complete race distance. The contact element is what attracts drivers and fans alike and requires great skill in delivering and withstanding the hits that are part and parcel of Hotstox racing.

== History ==
=== 1984 Origins ===
Hotstox was a concept developed by then promoter of the now defunct Long Eaton Stadium – Keith Barber. Barber also edited and produced the premier Stock Car publication Stock Car Magazine (SCM). It was in the pages of SCM in 1983 that Barber outlined the idea of a budget contact racing formula as an alternative to BriSCA Formula 1 Stock Cars. The rules were influenced heavily by Stock Cars that Barber had seen in New Zealand. The New Zealand cars featured 'Stock' bodies and small capacity engines. Barber derived the name Hotstox from a formula that he had seen in South Africa during a visit in the 1960s.

Early Hotstox rules allowed a basic ladder chassis construction with power provided by a Rover V8 or Ford V6. Suspension was restricted to leaf spring arrangements with strictly standard shock absorbers – rules which exist to this day. Stock bodies from production road cars were to be used and although the first constructed Hotstox featured such bodies, it became clear that creating a stock bodied car was not practical as the time taken to fabricate them proved both time consuming and costly.

The first cars constructed were built by Paul Lomax and by Dennis Howell and his son John. Lomax's car featured a Ford Fiesta body. Demonstration races began taking place – mainly at Long Eaton with the first meeting proper running at Long Eaton in April 1984.

6 cars contested the races at the first meeting. The pioneering drivers being #69 Paul Lomax, 7 Nigel Parker, 8 Ron Poyser, 50 Graham Bird, 58 Steve Booth and 99 Jack Eyres in the Lomax prototype. Although John Howell helped construct one of the first cars, he never went on to race a Hotstox. The first ever race was won by Nigel Parker who also took the feature final. The 2nd heat race was won by Graham Bird. A month later, the 2nd meeting took place at Long Eaton where two more competitors appeared: 3 Pete Clinch and 68 Alf Lomax (cousin of Paul). The race results were exactly as at the first meeting with Parker winning the 1st heat and final and Bird taking the 2nd heat.

Grids of up to 15 cars began to appear and meetings were staged at other venues: Scunthorpe, Coventry, Rochdale and Northampton. The first national championship was held at Long Eaton and was won by 3 Pete Clinch with a 3 Litre V6 Ford – and the Points Champion was Nigel Parker. By season's end, 19 meetings had been raced plus 1 demo (Coventry).

=== 1985 2nd season ===
Having had a successful first season, it was clear that some organising would be required. Kath Lomax (wife of Paul) had been given the task of implementing a points structure and assumed the role of press officer, fixture planner and other behind the scenes assignments.

Keith Barber had constructed a new Hotstox based upon 1950s pioneer racer Harold 'Bozzy' Bosworth's Model B Ford Stock Car. The racer would be given away as a prize in a competition run by Barber's Stock Car Magazine. The winner, Barry Tempest (present day BSCDA Secretary) raced it only twice – blowing the engine both times before selling the car back to builder Barber.

The relative success of the fledgling Hotstox formula garnered interest and criticism from the British Stock Car Drivers Association (BSCDA) who saw the new budget Hotstox formula as a threat to the popular F1 Stock Car division. Fixtures were harder to come by due to BSCDA pressure. The fixture list ran from month to month with last minute meetings added in or cancelled. Long Eaton was the only promotion to guarantee their meetings. Still, 27 meetings took place: LE 9, Scunthorpe 6, Cleethorpes 4, Belle Vue 3, NiR 2 and Boston, Crewe and Skegness 1 each. Nigel Parker retained his Points Championship and added a British Championship to his trophy cabinet. The Nationals was taken once again by Pete Clinch. 27 drivers had raced. Notable additions to the formula included 96 Pete Morris, 24 John Gibson, 17 Andy Hulse, 72 Mike Dignan and 88 Graham Mellor.

=== 1986 – 3rd season ===
1986 really should have seen the formula hit the big time but, meetings were still hard to come by with just 19 definite fixtures including sessions at Barrow in Furness. Despite a much bigger driver base of 51 registered, attendances averaged around the 20 mark. Much publicity was gained when ex 1981 F1 World Champion Len Wolfenden joined the ranks.

In August the Hotstox traveled east to Mildenhall. It was there that Kath Lomax began discussions with Spedeworth representatives about the possibility of the Hotstox and Spedeworth F1 formula racing together.

In September, 13 drivers made the trip to the Isle of Man to race for the 1st Manx TT Trophy. Winner of the Championship was 190 Len Wolfenden. A round up of the Championships saw 69 Paul Lomax take the Nationals at Long Eaton, The British at Belle Vue and the Points Championship to boot. 32 meetings were staged: LE 11, Belle Vue 6, Skegness 4, Cleethorpes 4, Barrow and Rochdale 2 each and NiR, Mildenhall and Aycliffe 1 a piece.

=== 1987 Spedeworth ===
With gaps appearing in the fixture list and following on from the initial Spedeworth contact made at Mildenhall in 1986, the Hotstox journeyed south to Wimbledon Stadium, Plough Lane, London in April 1987 for an historic first meeting racing against the Spedeworth F1's. Paul Lomax scored two heat wins and the meeting was heralded as a complete success. A month later 19 Hotstox traveled to the capital and took on 25 Spedeworth F1's again receiving much praise for both sides.

The first ever solo Hotstox meeting took place at Long Eaton on 20 June. This was a real milestone for a formula that was less than 3 years old, going from nothing to a meeting dedicated to the formula. This also marked the appearance of some Spedeworth F1's first venture on to a BriSCA shale track. The British Championship was held at Belle Vue in September where rumours of Stock Car Racing legend Stuart Smith's appearance at the wheel of a spare Lomax car were proved right. However, even Smith could not stop Len Wolfenden from walking away with the silverware. Not content with that, Wolfenden went to Wimbledon a month later and brought home the Spedeworth version. The Nationals saw Paul Lomax successfully defend his title at Long Eaton in November and also go on to win the points. The meetings were shared by: Long Eaton 10, Belle Vue 6, Wimbledon 3, Boston 3, Northampton 2, Hartlepool 2, Aycliffe 2, Skegness 2 with Scunthorpe and Crewe 1 each. There were over 70 active drivers by season's end.

=== 1988 Continued growth ===
The Spedeworth connection continued with Hotstox racing at Ipswich's Foxhall Heath stadium, Wisbech's South Brink and Plough Lane Wimbledon. The Hotstox also debuted at Buxton's High Edge Raceway and after 2 years of trying, secured 2 dates at Birmingham Wheels which proved to become one of the most successful tracks for the Hotstox. The annual visit to the Isle of Man saw Paul Lomax crowned as Manx Champion to which he added the British and Points Championships. The Nationals went to 96 Pete Morris at Long Eaton which led the fixtures list with 10 meetings, Scunthorpe 5, Aycliffe, Crewe & Northampton with 4, Skegness 3, Sheffield, Birmingham, and Boston 2 and Buxton chipping in with 1 each.

=== 1989 Continued growth ===
1989 saw another influx of Ministox youth joined the ranks with Steve Hodgson, Lisa Harter, Andy Smith and Andy Turner stepping up from the junior division. Turner won the season opener with a final victory at Buxton, from another Ex F1 driver, Trevor Cadman, Richard Ainsworth made the move from F1 to Hotstox as did John Cayzer. Both Ainsworth and Cayzer debuted a Hotstox version of their F1's with Cayzer also building an identical sister car to his own for near neighbour Ms. Harter.

Another event under threat, but for totally different reasons, was that of the Manx Championship. The ferry company had hiked their prices up but relented eventually and the trip to the Isle of Man went ahead with Pete Morris taking the Manx Sword home.

The highest ever turnout of 49 Hotstox at Long Eaton's May meeting was topped by season's end with 53 at the same venue. The Spedeworth connection was kept alive with Paul and Alf Lomax, Keith Chambers, Pete Morris and Lisa Harter all making the trip to Ipswich for the Spedeworth British which was won by Spedeworth driver, the late Terry O'Connor. There followed a meeting at Wisbech which featured separate events for both Hotstox and Spedeworth F1's. Both raced for their own versions of the East Anglian Championship before a joint allcomers race which turned into a demolition derby. The winner of the East Anglian Championship was Jon Maw who tragically lost his life later the same year. Jon is remembered to this day with the running of the Jon Maw memorial trophy.

In what was a year heavily dominated by ex ministox drivers, only the experienced Richard Ainsworth was able to keep the young guns away from all of the silverware as he took the National Points. Andy Hodgson won the Nationals; Keith Chambers won the British and Ray Witts took the Northern and Midland. The Manx Championship was won by Pete Morris.

Sadly, Aycliffe closed its doors after having hosted 5 Hotstox meetings in 1989, Long Eaton again topped out with 11, Buxton, Birmingham and Scunthorpe weighed in with 5 each with Hartlepool and Mildenhall staging 2 apiece.

A young Andrew Smith debuted late in the season but suffered engine problems.

=== 1990 BriSCA ===
1990 saw yet more new names enter the sport. Jim Bamford, Mick Rogers, Brandon Marlow, Mark Ford, Elliot Smith (son of ex F1 hard charger Gordon Smith) and ex Mini-stocker Billy Johnson. The youngsters again dominated Hotstox racing with Andy Smith doing very well early on in the season. As in 1989, it was Richard Ainsworth, who was able to keep the young blood behind him to set the pace for the points chase.

2 meetings on Spedeworth turf at Wisbech were run again as separate events from the Spedeworth F1's. One of the events being the English Championship won by 272 Andy Hodgson.

Initial approaches were made by BriSCA to the Hotstox Association (HSA) to engage in a loose association.

Back on track, the Hotstox raced at Bradford for the first time, Keith Chambers took the Manx Championship, Ray Witts successfully defended his Northern and Midland title and Richard Ainsworth took the British, The Nationals and the Points Championship.

=== 1991 Andy Smith emergence ===
Amongst the new names to sign up were Neil Stuchbury, Jason Pursey, Warwick Ellis, Paul Heath, Stu Fellows, Paul Davies and Guy Parker. Shortly after the season kicked off, Paul Lomax announced his retirement, although he would remain involved with the sport.

The association with Spedeworth had now faded after an incident involving Phil Haigh and Spedeworth driver Jason Holden during the previous season. Haigh had also joined the HSA committee during the winter.

Stoke appeared on the fixture list for the first time and the battle for the points was a hot one as Ainsworth led but only just from Andy Smith and Witts. Phil Haigh took his first major title when he won the English Championship. Keith Chambers took the British and also successfully defended his Manx title as did Ray Witts when he retained the Northern and Midland remarkably the only driver to have won that particular title at the time. Ainsworth still led the points but in late July he broke his arm and had to sit out the rest of the season. This left the door open for Witts and Smith to fight for the points.

The Nationals at Long Eaton attracted the season's biggest attendance – the biggest ever with 55 cars. The title went to Andy Smith.

=== 1992 Andy Smith banned ===
During 1991, joint F1 / Hotstox meetings were run – successfully. However, The HSA raised concerns over some tracks that failed to provide sufficient track staff. 1992 would feature more joint F1/Hotstox meetings but there were still issues between the HSA and BriSCA. Most notably the loss of some dates which meant a very successful Whites and Yellows championship series would be reduced from 15 to just 9 rounds. The argument from Kath Lomax was that the series helped encourage new drivers into the formula.

New drivers for '92 included Chris Lloyd, Glen Pursey and Paul Fantom. Richard Ainsworth was back to take on Witts and Smith but also had to contend with Gary Monk and Elliot Smith who both made Superstar early in the season.

The major talking point in 1992 and possibly ever since, was the debut of a new car at Hednesford on 12 April. The car in question is probably the most famous Hotstox ever. Its builder has often been accused of being responsible for the near extinction of the Hotstox formula. Andy Smith takes up the story "I had run Ray Witts close in the '91 points and decided to build a new car for '92. I had spent a lot of time around the F1 scene and gathered a lot of ideas for the car. One of them was offset. No one had actually used a lot of offset and I soon realised that to get the engine over to the inside of the chassis, I needed to get it lower too. A lot of the other cars had massive cabs, mine featured a much smaller cab and my car was the first to feature spring boxes for weight jacking. It was a rush to get it ready for Hednesford and I'd had no help from my dad until right at the last minute when I was struggling to get the car finished in time. We managed to get it down to Hednesford the day before for some practice but that didn't go too well as we had a misfire. We managed to cure that and make it to Hednesford the next day. I really didn't know how well the car would go but it went like a rocket!. I won heat, Final and GN from the lap handicap, it just flew. The car was then weighed and found to be underweight and I was banned for 3 or 4 meetings and had my points and prize money taken away. It was a genuine mistake; I'd rushed to get the car done and didn't even consider the weight. What made it worse was that they had weighed some cars the previous week and found some cars under and overweight but had let them go as long as the drivers put it right for the next meeting. I totally agree that I should have had my points and money taken off me, but I can't help but think that they had been harsh with me."

A week later, Phil Haigh had heavily fenced Rob Maw, but a disciplinary committee could find no evidence of a deliberate fencing but warned Haigh of his behaviour. Haigh was at first seen as an entertainer, his forceful style together with his role as a self-appointed enforcer or 'Equaliser' as he liked to be known had drawn complaints from a lot of drivers with whom he had had vendettas. He tended to champion the underdog and pursue those who had expensive cars or big budgets. He soon became hard to control especially as he was by then a committee member. His car was weighed at Birmingham and found to be overweight. He argued that it was the scrutineer who had not weighed the car correctly or the scales which were faulty. He was once asked to tidy the appearance of his car; his reply was to turn up at the next meeting having wallpapered it. Kath Lomax saw Haigh as a threat to the integrity of the formula who single-handedly drew as much time and resources from the committee than anything else. Her view was that if Haigh could not control his behaviour, then he should be banned from the formula. It was a view that many shared, but many did not feel strong enough to take a stance against as each time Haigh managed to dodge any disciplinary action.

Following this chain of events, both Haigh and Smith resigned from the committee. In July at Buxton, Haigh had deliberately fenced Nigel Parker in one of the heat races. During the Final, Keith Chambers put Haigh in so hard that it brought the fence down. The race was halted whilst the fence was repaired. This enabled Haigh to make repairs to his car and he came back out on track. Chambers duly ran Haigh back in again, bringing the fence down once more. Buxton promoter Barry Watson immediately withdrew his race dates until this issue was resolved. Chambers received a ban and was fined for his actions. No action was taken against Haigh.

A letter from BriSCA had been sent to the Hotstox drivers informing them that BriSCA no longer wished to be involved with the Hotstox as long as Kath Lomax was part of the organisation. Whether this stance was in support of Phil Haigh or as a direct reply to Kath Lomax's continued requests for proper treatment of the Hotstox at various tracks or because she resisted joining BriSCA is unclear. The Lomax's regrettably resigned from a formula they had been involved with for nearly 10 years. The whole committee then stood down and BriSCA requested that the Hotstox form a Board of Control to enable an easier integration into BriSCA. Plain and simple, BriSCA did not wish to work with Kath Lomax any longer and Kath honorably stood aside. The new committee was led by Hans Kirimaa.

Back to the racing it was Richard Ainsworth who fairly comfortably beat Witts and Andy Smith for the National Points whilst the Eaton brothers claimed their first titles – the British went to Mark, and Jon took the Nationals held for the first time away from 'home' (Long Eaton) at Skegness. A new championship – The European Gold Cup – was Andy Smith's swansong as he announced his departure from Hotstox: "I came into Hotstox because I wanted to. I never even considered doing F1 as I just didn't see me being able to afford it. The ban gave me the push to want to do F1's and I built a Hotstox for Jason Pursey as well as selling my two to get enough money together to build an F1."

=== 1993–94 The dark years ===
Following the Lomax resignation, the formula began to decline. A new Board of Control was formed but failed to regain the initiative. By the end of 1993, top drivers Phil Haigh and Elliott Smith retired, and Richard Ainsworth blew one too many engines and decided to call it a day and Keith Chambers moved on to F1 taking Nigel Parker with him as chief mechanic. Ray Witts took the British, Nationals and National Points Championships.

In 1994 Talks with Spedeworth once again were entered into as both divisions struggled to put cars on track in large numbers. Visiting Hotstox drivers raced at Wimbledon against the Spedeworth F1's with Ray Witts winning the Spedeworth British Championship on another visit to Wimbledon. 244 Mick Rogers took his first Nationals title at Birmingham but could not stop Ray Witts from taking the Hotstox British Championship and National Points.

=== 1995–1999 Spedeworth revisited ===
1995 brought a name change for the Hotstox in an attempt to change the image and appeal to attract new drivers. The new moniker – V8 Stock Cars – was adopted. The Spedeworth F1's also chose to adopt the new name as the two divisions grew closer. By season's end, Spedeworth driver 98 Peter Scott had won the British away from home at Birmingham and Andy Turner had taken the Nationals and National Points. Witts had by then succumbed to the draw of F1 and faded from the V8 scene to construct something special for his F1 debut.

By 1996, a core of around 20 drivers kept up appearances. There were more names on the register, but regulars were hard to come by. Meetings were also hard to come by with Buxton becoming the supportive crutch. Barry Watson also ventured on track in an ex-Elliott Smith car in an effort to boost car numbers but it was a struggle to get above 20 cars at most meetings and it tended to be the same 20 or less each meeting although visiting Spedeworth drivers did help increase numbers when they travelled. Andy Turner retained his Nationals title but had to give best to 244 Mick Rogers who took the British and the Points.

The ties between the V8's and the Spedeworth V8's were worked on for the 1997 season. Both parties were keen to work on a unified fixture list but separate championships still existed even though both divisions raced for each other's championships. With more travelling by both sets of drivers, both divisions gained car numbers. The 97 British title was won by Spedeworth racer S58 Terry O'Connor, the Spedeworth National title saw a novice graded Hotstox driver 313 Dave Hobbs take the win on a wet night at Wimbledon. Mick Rogers won the World Final (renamed to avoid a title clash with the Spedeworth Nationals) at Buxton. The race was a bruising affair for some of the Spedeworth visitors who fell victim to one or two Northern V8s. S98 Peter Scott was a big threat who was fenced heavily by 45 John Adams to help ensure the title stayed North.

Andy Turner moved on to F1's. 334 Dave Atkinson campaigned the ex-Ray Witts tarmac car and quietly worked his way to a National points title over Mick Rogers.

For the first time, the fixture list would officially involve Spedeworth run tracks. The 1998 Points Championship was unified and nationalised with drivers from the North and South racing for the same titles. The problem was that neither division fully committed to each other's fixtures. The only tracks that really fully benefited were Wimbledon, Northampton and Birmingham. They generally attracted 5 or 6 'away' drivers per meeting. Another problem was that Spedeworth did not at that time publish a full years racing schedule. They tended to run to a three-month fixture list which produced problems for the V8's as some Spedeworth dates clashed with the confirmed dates as published before the season started. As a result, both divisions failed to gain car numbers as both chose to race 'at home'.

Following the 1997 World Final, the racing between the two divisions had become a little tense. Matters were made worse when the Spedeworth drivers refused to fit restrictor plates on their engines. Generally, the racing was fairly even but on a dry track, the Spedeworth cars had a definitive power advantage. Some of the Northern V8's were becoming discouraged and matters would only get worse as the season wore on. A real 'them or us' war was simmering away. The war would reach the surface at the Spedeworth Ipswich staged World Final. The first time the Northern V8's stood the chance of losing their own title. Come the night, the Northern V8's arrived in force only to be told that only two races had been planned by the promotion. With the threat of an en-masse load up, the promotion relented and gave the drivers a third race with the World Final as race one. Mick Rogers started on pole and made a good start. As the race wore on, the rest of the Northern challenge fell by the wayside leaving Rogers to fend off the Spedeworth challenge. Some unnecessary race stoppages compounded Rogers' problems and eventually he was overhauled as 594 Marty Page took the title South. The rest of the evenings programme became a heavy affair as the Northern drivers sought their revenge with 113 Neil Stuchbury in the thick of the action. It would be the very last time the North and South would race together as the joint venture was abandoned.

It was during the 1999 season that the idea of introducing the 350 Chevy in standard form was once again tabled in an attempt to keep costs down and attract new drivers. The major concerns apart from the additional weight were policing the 'standard' Chevy with so many aftermarket parts available plus displeasing the F1 BSCDA who might have thought the Chevy was a bit too close to their territory. The V8 BoC were split with the anti-Chevy supporters proposing the introduction of the 3.9 and 4.2 Rover engines in standard form. The drivers were given the choice and by a narrow margin chose the Rover option.

One major event which happened completely by surprise during 1999 was the V8's racing on the hallowed shale of Coventry Stadium. Promoter Martin Ochiltree had cancelled another formula after learning of their short numbers and approached the V8's to fill in. In short notice, 20 odd V8's were assembled and put on a decent display. As a result, one further date was offered later in the season and a promise of further dates for 2000.

=== 2000 Stuart Smith Jr ===
The millennium was to be a fairly pivotal year. Low car numbers had plagued the formula for a number of seasons and at times it had been a real struggle to rectify the situation. At least once the drivers had been read the riot act – turn up or face extinction.

Two things helped the V8's turn a corner. The first was a committed string of dates at Coventry as support to the F1's and the second came from Rochdale, lancs.

Stuart Smith Jnr. was offered an old Hotstox chassis by sister-in-law Lisa Harter who had kept her old Cayzer car since retiring it. Stuart refurbished it and entered the V8 arena. If Andy's last season in Hotstox was supposedly so detrimental to the formula then, Stuarts first would do nothing but good for the budget division. His presence at Coventry, racing on the same bill as the F1s, helped bring attention to the V8 formula, aided in part by his family's racing heritage. Stuart managed to get an ageing car to red top in no time and he did it by being consistent.

Mick Rogers took a clean sweep of the major titles for 2000 but Stuart found a buyer for his ancient Cayzer car and started construction of a real race winner for the 2001 season. Mick Rogers dominance had a challenger.

During 2000, the BSCDA chaired by Stuart Milnes had negotiations with some members of the V8 BoC to discuss the V8's joining the BSCDA. The drivers were offered the choice and the majority voted on a union. After a number of years in the red, the V8's were now looking at a brighter future.

=== 2001–2002 Smith V Rogers ===
2001 featured a season long battle between Rogers and Smith. Smith took the Nationals at Buxton and followed that up with the National Points which came a bit easier as Rogers broke his ankle playing football with his son in the back yard and had to miss the last 4 meetings of the season. Stuart wrapped the points up at the last meeting to cap a great season for him and the V8's. Hotstox returnee Mick Greenwood captured the British Championship. Once more the V8's had begun to attract new drivers and car numbers steadily rose.

2002 was round two of Smith versus Rogers. Smith was robbed of a World Final at Belle Vue when a lap scoring error had wiped out the lead he had built up and this allowed Rogers to close and pass to take the title. Somewhat dejected, Smith made sure of his second National Points before a move into F1's with a young Chris Cowley the new owner of the Smith car. 575 Darren Cottrill captured his first major with a victory in the British Championship.

=== 2003–present ===
After Stuart had brought so much good publicity to the V8's, his departure left a bit of a hole. 131 Kevin Stuchbury helped to fill the void and took on Rogers for the Points Championship. The British Championship was taken by a young driver who had been racing below par machinery for a couple of seasons before getting serious with a new construction. Chris Fort had grown up around the Wainman's in Silsden and learned his trade in a car nicknamed Frankenstockcar or the 'Bye Bye Now' special (so-called because of that slogan painted very firmly tongue in cheek on the back of the car). Rogers took the World Final at Northampton but had to give best to Stuchbury who took the Points title at the last meeting.

Mick Rogers served the Hotstox for many years and enjoyed a lot of success especially towards the end of his Hotstox career. A birthday present in the shape of a run out in Paul Hines' spare F1 at an end of season 2005 Birmingham Wheels was all the carrot needed and Mick's cars were offered for sale in readiness for a career move into F1's. Before Mick moved on, he claimed a seventh Nationals title and a fifth National Points in 2004.

As has been the trend for the Hotstox, one or two drivers have tended to dominate and with Rogers' departure, Chris Fort took on the mantle of top man. Chris claimed his first Nationals title at Sheffield in 2005 and backed it up with a National Points Championship. Fort made it back-to-back titles in 2006 with the British to make it a clean sweep. Fort then pursued a career in F1's to allow Kevin Stuchbury to take over at the top. Kevin going on to take all three majors in 2007 and the World and National Points in 2008. 161 Mark Allen took his career first title when he won the British Championship re-run at Coventry's April session. A full list of the major title winners appears for the first time ever in any publication. It took a lot of research to compile the list but it's all there (see below).

Currently, the Hotstox – having reverted to the original name – have seen increased participation, with car numbers regularly reaching thirty. Improved organisation and regulation have contributed to the formula's continued development.

Hotstox can be considered a training ground for drivers, with many drivers having progressed from Hotstox to careers in F1. Frankie Wainman has said on more than one occasion that the Hotstox should be treated as a stepping-stone from Ministox to F1.

The Hotstox celebrated 25 years in 2009.

In 2013 Chris Bracher made history in the formula when he won his fourth consecutive World Championship at Coventry. Bracher started outside row 10; a gruelling race saw the lead change hands on 5 occasions to 5 different drivers; early leaders Kevin Stuchbury, Craig Smith and Sam Mee all fell by the wayside; leaving Darren Cottrill and Bracher to fight it out. Bracher taking the lead just a handful of laps left to run. World Final night also saw celebration for long serving driver Bryan Andrew, who in 2013 completed his 25th anniversary in the formula. Bryan is still racing and continues to mix it; picking up race wins along the way.

== 2014 – 30th anniversary season ==
2014 saw the formula keep going from strength to strength; more new drivers and new cars appearing along with a host of different drivers doing the winning. The formula also returns to two tracks which haven't featured the formula for a number of years (Mildenhall and King's Lynn) The first part of the season will be remembered for Phoebe Wainman (daughter of Frankie Wainman Junior) achieved notable results early in the season, accumulating wins and points and becoming the first woman to lead the National Points standings in an adult national formula. Hayley Williams also impressed in the first part of the season; Hayley making history when she won the feature final race at Birmingham 26 April – the first ever lady to win a final in the V8 Hotstox since the formula started. The win was also the first Final Hayley won in her Stock Car career after previously racing the National Ministox.

== New Zealand link ==
In 2006 links were established with the promoter of Paradise Valley Speedway in Rotorua, New Zealand – Sonja Hickey. Two Hotstox drivers travelled to Rotorua to participate in the 'World of Stocks' in April 2007. Chris Fort and Stuart Milnes raced borrowed cars for the Championship with Fort acquitting himself well. In August 2007, 3 New Zealand drivers – Paul Maybe, Clive Pritchard and Scott Gallopp – raced in the Hotstox World Final meeting (Maybe and Pritchard also raced in the World Final itself whilst Gallopp only contested the rest of the programme) at King's Lynn. Maybe ran 3rd for a large part of the race before mechanical failure relegated him down the field.

April 2008 saw Hotstox drivers Matt Smith, Marc Radforth and Darren Cottrill race in New Zealand with Radforth performing well and Cottrill managing to roll his car. Kiwi drivers racing in the UK were Nick Vallance, Alan and Graham McRobbie. Alan McRobbie scored two wins at his one and only UK race meeting – no mean feat.

In March 2009 Mark Allen and Steve Bowman travelled to Rotorua, North Island, New Zealand to represent the UK. Drivers from New Zealand represented their country in the UK also with Scott Fredrickson competing at many meetings throughout the summer and recording race wins including a feature final at Coventry. Scott was joined by Dale Stewart and Doug Stanaway for the 2009 V8 Hotstox World Final although all three recorded a DNF (Did Not Finish).

In 2010 Ivan Pritchard and the then current V8 Hotstox World Champion Chris Fort represented the UK at the World of Stocks event at Rotorua's Paradise Valley Speedway, New Zealand. During their stay, Fort recorded a win – the first UK representative from the V8 Hotstox formula to do so. The New Zealand representative for the 2010 World Final at Buxton on 1 August 2010 was Shaun Stewart. Stewart recorded a DNF after suffering an arm injury during the race and took no further part in the meeting.

In March 2011 Chris Bracher – 2010 World Champion – represented the UK at the Rotorua staged World of Stocks event where he managed to finish just one race out of three in 25th place. His 4–point haul bringing him home in last position. Winner of the event – Scott Fredrickson – looks set to represent New Zealand in the UK at the Belle Vue staging of the V8 Hotstox World Final in September.

== The tracks ==
Currently, the Hotstox can be seen at the following venues in the UK:

- Aldershot Raceway
- Buxton Raceway
- Cowdenbeath Stadium
- Hednesford Hills Raceway
- King's Lynn
- Lochgelly Raceway
- Mildenhall
- Northampton International Raceway
- Sheffield Owlerton Raceway
- Skegness Raceway
- Taunton Raceway
- Bristol Mendips Raceway
- Yarmouth Stadium
- Arlington (Eastbourne)

== National / world champions ==
Season	Number	Driver
1984	3	Pete Clinch
1985	3	Pete Clinch
1986	69	Paul Lomax
1987	69	Paul Lomax
1988	96	Pete Morris
1989	272	Andy Hodgson
1990	354	Richard Ainsworth
1991	391	Andy Smith
1992	61	Jon Eaton
1993	180	Ray Witts
1994	244	Mick Rogers
1995	488	Andy Turner
1996	488	Andy Turner
1997	244	Mick Rogers
1998	594	Marty Page
1999	244	Mick Rogers
2000	244	Mick Rogers
2001	391	Stuart Smith Jnr
2002	244	Mick Rogers
2003	244	Mick Rogers
2004	244	Mick Rogers
2005	213	Chris Fort
2006	213	Chris Fort
2007	131	Kevin Stuchbury
2008	131	Kevin Stuchbury
2009	3	Chris Fort
2010	473	Chris Bracher
2011	1	Chris Bracher
2012	1	Chris Bracher
2013	1	Chris Bracher
2014	131	Kevin Stuchbury
2015	131 (1)	Kevin Stuchbury
2016	157	Adam Joyce
2017	157 (1)	Adam Joyce
2018	157 (1)	Adam Joyce
2019	498 (1)	Olly Spencer
2020	Not Run	Not Run
2021	485	Steve Thompson
2022	131	Kevin Stuchbury
2023	329	Thomas Brighton
2024	146	Grant Leather
2025	329	Thomas Brighton
2026	329	Thomas Brighton

== National points champions ==
Season	Number	Driver
1984	7	Nigel Parker
1985	7	Nigel Parker
1986	69	Paul Lomax
1987	69	Paul Lomax
1988	69	Paul Lomax
1989	354	Richard Ainsworth
1990	354	Richard Ainsworth
1991	180	Ray Witts
1992	354	Richard Ainsworth
1993	180	Ray Witts
1994	180	Ray Witts
1995	488	Andy Turner
1996	244	Mick Rogers
1997	334	Dave Atkinson
1998	244	Mick Rogers
1999	244	Mick Rogers
2000	244	Mick Rogers
2001	391	Stuart Smith Jnr
2002	391	Stuart Smith Jnr
2003	131	Kevin Stuchbury
2004	244	Mick Rogers
2005	213	Chris Fort
2006	213	Chris Fort
2007	131	Kevin Stuchbury
2008	131	Kevin Stuchbury
2009	3	Chris Fort
2010	161	Mark Allen
2011	131	Kevin Stuchbury
2012	1	Chris Bracher
2013	131	Kevin Stuchbury
2014	131 (1)	Kevin Stuchbury
2015	131 (1)	Kevin Stuchbury
2016	157 (1)	Adam Joyce
2017	157 (1)	Adam Joyce
2018	157 (1)	Adam Joyce
2019	131	Kevin Stutchbury
2020	Not Run	Not Run
2021	131	Kevin Stutchbury
2022	485	Steve Thompson
2023	201	Evan Bullock
2024	288	Jon Brown
2025	329	Thomas Brighton
2026	329	Thomas Brighton

== British champions ==
Season	Number	Driver
1984	-	Not Run
1985	7	Nigel Parker
1986	69	Paul Lomax
1987	190	Len Wolfenden
1988	69	Paul Lomax
1989	250	Keith Chambers
1990	354	Richard Ainsworth
1991	250	Keith Chambers
1992	161	Mark Eaton
1993	180	Ray Witts
1994	180	Ray Witts
1995	98	Peter Scott
1996	244	Mick Rogers
1997	58	Terry O'Connor
1998	8	John Driscoll
1999	244	Mick Rogers
2000	244	Mick Rogers
2001	130	Mick Greenwood
2002	575	Darren Cottrill
2003	213	Chris Fort
2004	-	Not Run
2005	-	Not Run
2006	213	Chris Fort
2007	131	Kevin Stuchbury
2008	161	Mark Allen
2009	3	Chris Fort
2010	159	Carl Radforth
2011	187	Craig Smith
2012	131	Kevin Stuchbury
2013	187	Craig Smith
2014	131	Kevin Stuchbury
2015	131	Kevin Stuchbury
2016	211	Phoebe Wainman
2017	409	Luke Maw
2018	157 (1)	Adam Joyce
2019	485	Steve Thompson
2020	-	Not Run
2021	485 (1)	Steve Thompson
2022	485 (1)	Steve Thompson
2023	329	Thomas Brighton
2024	288	Jon Brown
2025	257	Timmy Aldridge
2026	277	Thomas Rogers

== Notable drivers ==
Notable ex and current Hotstox drivers include:

- Andrew Smith – 1994, 2006, 2008, 2009 & 2010 F1 Stock car World Champion
- Keith Chambers – 1995 F1 Stock car World Champion
- Stuart Smith Jnr – 2007 & 2018 F1 Stock car World Champion and 2008 British F1 Stock car Champion
- Paul Hines – 2005 European F1 Stock car Champion, 2010 F1 Stock car British Champion
- Frankie Wainman Snr – 1979 F1 Stock car World Champion and multiple National Points Champion
- Paul Lomax – Multiple Hotstox Champion
- Nigel Parker – Multiple Hotstox Champion
- Ray Witts – Multiple Hotstox Champion
- Andy Turner – Multiple Hotstox Champion
- Mick Rogers – Multiple Hotstox Champion
- Chris Fort – Multiple Hotstox Champion
- Kevin Stuchbury – Multiple Hotstox Champion
- Chris Bracher – 4-time World Champion 2010–2013
- Phoebe Wainman – First ever lady to reach Superstar & first lady to win a championship (British 2016)
- Hayley Williams – First ever lady to win a feature final race
- Adam Joyce – Multiple World and National Points Champion
- Thomas Brighton – Youngest Ever World Champion at 17 Years old in 2023. Now a multiple champion
- Evan Bullock - Youngest Ever National Points Champion at 17 Years Old November 2023
