= BriSCA Formula 1 Stock Cars World Championship =

The World Championship is an annual competition started in 1955 for BriSCA Formula 1 Stock Cars. It is the premier championship of the formula and the winner is granted the honour of racing with a gold roof and wing until the next World Final, and if desired they can race under number 1.

== Qualification ==
The World Final is usually held in September. The host tracks, all of which are based in the UK, are decided by the BriSCA promoters.

The grid for the World Final is mostly composed of drivers from the UK who are chosen through a series of qualifying rounds and two World Championship Semi-Finals. Drivers who fail to progress from the World Semi-Finals may race again in a Consolation Semi-Final to choose two more entrants, and the reigning World Champion is entitled to start at the rear of the grid if they have not already qualified. The UK drivers are joined by stock car drivers from the Netherlands, and by invited drivers in the nearest equivalent motorsport formulas from other countries often including Australia, New Zealand, South Africa and the USA.

The most successful driver in World Final races is John Lund, who has won eight. Other notable multiple winners include Stuart Smith (six), Andy Smith (five), Peter Falding (four) Tom Harris (five), Johnny Brise, Dave Chisholm and Frankie Wainman Junior (three).

== List of winners ==
There were two races promoted as the World Championship in 1955, at Harringay and Belle Vue.

All drivers are British, except where marked.

Year	Winner	Second	Third	Venue
1955	Mac McDonnell	Joe Farley	Percy Betts	Harringay
1955	Jerry Wojtowicz	Vic Ferriday	Steve Storm	Belle Vue, Manchester
1956	Johnny Brise	Jimmy Gee	Vic Ferriday	Belle Vue, Manchester
1957	Aubrey Leighton	Doug Wardropper	Harry Foot	Belle Vue, Manchester
1958	Bob Reeve	Graham Warner	Aubrey Leighton	Belle Vue, Manchester
1959	Johnny Brise	Fred Mitchell	Doug Wardropper	Belle Vue, Manchester
1960	Johnny Brise	Fred Mitchell	Doug Wardropper	Coventry
1961	Jock Lloyd	Johnny King	Ted Pankhurst	West Ham
1962	Fred Mitchell	Ken Freeman	Alan Wardropper	Belle Vue, Manchester
1963	Doug Wardropper	Ted Pankhurst	Alan Wardropper	Harringay
1964	Trevor Frost	Don Evans	Nev Hughes	Coventry
1965	Ellis Ford	Alan Wardropper	Ron Rogers	West Ham
1966	Fred Mitchell	Ron Rogers	Charlie Finnikin	Belle Vue, Manchester
1967	George Ansell	Johnny Pratt	Ron Rogers	Harringay
1968	Tony Neal	Ron Rogers	Charlie Finnikin	Coventry
1969	Stuart Smith	Jim Esau	Gerry Weir	Belle Vue, Manchester
1970	Jim Esau	Stuart Smith	Pete Webb	Harringay
1971	Doug Cronshaw	Ian Durham	George Ansell	Coventry
1972	Stuart Smith	Mick Noden	Doug Cronshaw	Belle Vue, Manchester
1973	Dave Chisholm	Stuart Smith	Doug Cronshaw	Harringay
1974	Dave Chisholm	Stuart Smith	Mick Noden	Coventry
1975	Dave Chisholm	Stuart Smith	Doug Cronshaw	Belle Vue, Manchester
1976	Stuart Bamforth	Gordon Smith	Frankie Wainman	White City, Manchester
1977	Mike Close	Frankie Wainman	Willie Harrison	Coventry
1978	Dave Mellor	John Hillam	Glyn Pursey	Belle Vue, Manchester
1979	Frankie Wainman	Mick Noden	Bert Finnikin	White City, Manchester
1980	Stuart Smith	Dave Mellor	John Lund	Coventry
1981	Len Wolfenden	Brian Powles	Mike Close	Odsal, Bradford
1982	Willie Harrison	Mike Close	Dave Berresford	Belle Vue, Manchester
1983	Stuart Smith	Danny Clarke	Willie Harrison	Coventry
1984	Stuart Smith	Len Wolfenden	Dave Mellor	Belle Vue, Manchester
1985	Stuart Smith	Len Wolfenden	Bert Finnikin	Odsal, Bradford
1986	Peter Falding	Dave Mellor	Stuart Smith	Coventry
1987	John Lund	Frankie Wainman	Dave Berresford	Belle Vue, Manchester
1988	John Lund	John Toulson	Chris Elwell	Hednesford
1989	Ray Tyldesley	Peter Falding	Des Chandler	Coventry
1990	Bert Finnikin	Dave Berresford	John Lund	Odsal, Bradford
1991	John Lund	Bert Finnikin	Peter Falding	Hednesford
1992	John Lund	Bobby Burns	Peter Falding	Odsal, Bradford
1993	Peter Falding	Paul Harrison	Kev Smith	Coventry
1994	Andy Smith	Kev Smith	Dave Berresford	Odsal, Bradford
1995	Keith Chambers	Des Chandler	Murray Harrison	Hednesford
1996	John Lund	Paul Harrison	Frankie Wainman Junior	Coventry
1997	John Lund	Frankie Wainman Junior	Peter Falding	Odsal, Bradford
1998	Frankie Wainman Junior	Rob Pearce	Paul Harrison	Coventry
1999	Murray Harrison	Frankie Wainman	John Lund	Coventry
2000	John Lund	Andy Smith	Murray Harrison	Coventry
2001	Rob Speak	Frankie Wainman Junior	Andy Smith	Hednesford
2002	John Lund	Rob Speak	Dave Johnson	Coventry
2003	Peter Falding	Murray Harrison	Steve Cayzer	Coventry
2004	Peter Falding	Ed Neachell	Steve Cayzer	Coventry
2005	Frankie Wainman Junior	(Netherlands) Dave Schaap	Andy Smith	Northampton
2006	Andy Smith	Frankie Wainman Junior	Stuart Smith Junior	Coventry
2007	Stuart Smith Junior	Frankie Wainman Junior	Andy Smith	King's Lynn Stadium
2008	Andy Smith	Paul Harrison	(Netherlands) Ron Kroonder	Ipswich
2009	Andy Smith	Frankie Wainman Junior	Paul Harrison	King's Lynn Stadium
2010	Andy Smith	Frankie Wainman Junior	Craig Finnikin	Coventry
2011	Paul Harrison	Dan Johnson	Andy Smith	Northampton
2012	Lee Fairhurst	Dan Johnson	Frankie Wainman Junior	Skegness
2013	Tom Harris	Craig Finnikin	Ryan Harrison	King's Lynn Stadium
2014	Craig Finnikin	Stuart Smith Junior	Dan Johnson	Coventry
2015	Rob Speak	Frankie Wainman Junior	Mat Newson	King's Lynn Stadium
2016	Frankie Wainman Junior	Rob Speak	Lee Fairhurst	Coventry
2017	Nigel Green	Ryan Harrison	Frankie Wainman Junior	Ipswich
2018	Stuart Smith Junior	Nigel Green	Dan Johnson	Skegness
2019	Tom Harris	Ryan Harrison	Craig Finnikin	King's Lynn Stadium
2020	Not held due to COVID-19 pandemic			
2021	Tom Harris	Lee Fairhurst	Paul Harrison	Odsal, Bradford
2022	Charlie Sworder	Bobby Griffin	(Netherlands) Wim Peeters	Ipswich
2023	Tom Harris	Craig Finnikin	(Netherlands) Wybe De Vries	Northampton
2024	Tom Harris	Frankie Wainman Junior	Mat Newson	Skegness
2025	Tom Harris	(Netherlands) Jelle Tesselaar	Lee Fairhurst	King's Lynn
2026	Kyle Gray	(Netherlands) Mark Vernstra	Frankie Wainman Junior	Northampton
