= Gears and Tears =

- Genre: Documentary
- Narrated by: Ralph Ineson
- Country of origin: United Kingdom
- Original language: English
- No. of series: 1
- No. of episodes: 6

Production
- Executive producer: William Lyons
- Producer: Charlie Clay
- Running time: 30 minutes

Original release
- Network: BBC One
- Release: 2 August – 6 September 2010

Gears and Tears is a British television documentary series about stock car racing, which originally aired on BBC One in 2010.

== Synopsis ==
Gears and Tears follows the story behind a BriSCA Formula One Stock Car Racing season, particularly a bitter battle between two dominant clans in the sport: the Wainmans from Yorkshire and the Smiths from Lancashire. Although the Wainmans and the Smiths are the central characters, other drivers who appear in the series include Nuneaton-based father and son Rob and Chris Cowley (race number 73 and 37 respectively), and Leicestershire double glazing company manager Paul Hines (race number 259).

== Production ==
The programme was narrated by Ralph Ineson (who was in Harry Potter and The Office) and produced by Charlie Clay who also produced Trawlermen. It was initiated by lifelong stock car fan and assistant producer on the show John Lakey who has worked on other BBC shows such as Top Gear, Wrong Car Right Car, and Panic Mechanics.

A large amount of on board mini-cameras that were used in the series brought stock car racing to life in a way that had never been seen before.

== Reception ==
The first episode of Gears and Tears was broadcast on Monday 2 August 2010, at 10:35pm, except in Northern Ireland and Wales, where it was shown half an hour later. The subsequent episodes were shown in the same timeslot, except for episode 5, which aired on Tuesday instead of Monday. The series was later released on DVD.
