= Frankie Wainman Jnr =

British Formula One stock car racer

Frankie Wainman Junior
- Nationality: (United Kingdom) British
- Born: 6 October 1971 (age 55) Silsden, West Yorkshire

BriSCA Formula 1 Stock Cars career
- Debut season: 1987
- Car number: 515 (1 in 1998/1999, 2005/2006,2016/2017)
- Wins: 1126

Previous series
- 1983-1986: Ministox

Frankie Wainman Junior (born 6 October 1971) is a BriSCA Formula 1 Stock Cars racing driver, who races using the number 515. Wainman is a three-time BriSCA F1 World Champion, fourteen-time National Points Champion and nine-time British Champion along with many other titles.

== Early life ==
Wainman was brought up in the small town of Silsden, West Yorkshire. He is the son of former racer Frankie Wainman (racing number 212).

== Racing career ==
Wainman began racing at ten years old in Ministox and won a number of championships including the British Points Championship.

At sixteen he made the switch to BriSCA F1 using a car he had built himself. After three weeks he won his first final, in November 1987. He has won three World Championships and fourteen National Points Championships, as well as many other championships. Wainman also builds stock cars for other drivers. In the Netherlands, Wainman has won the Long Track World Championship at Baarlo and World Cup at Venray.

In the UK 'off season' between January and March, Wainman travels to New Zealand to take part in their equivalent formula, Superstocks. In 1998 he won the World 240 Championship, and won two more in later years. As of 2013 he is the only driver to have won this title three times. He has built and raced his own car which he kept over in New Zealand but this was sold in 2014.

In 2007 Frankie had an almost career ending accident at Hednesford Hills Raceway.

Wainman and rival driver Andy Smith were the subject of a BBC documentary Gears and Tears which aired in 2010, being the stock car version of War of the Roses with Wainman from Silsden and Smith being from Rochdale. During the 1980s both of their fathers (Frankie Wainman and Stuart Smith) were in close battles week in and week out, the same as Frankie Junior and Andy were in the late 2000s and early 2010s.

In 2012 Frankie amassed 250 final wins, becoming only the second driver ever to accomplish this feat, Stuart Smith being the other with 500 final wins.

== Personal life ==
Wainman has two children, Phoebe and Frankie, both of whom have taken up racing in BriSCA F1, while in V8 Hotstox Phoebe became the first female stock car driver to win a major championship.

== Honours ==
- World Champion: 1998, 2005, 2016
- National Points Champion: 1994, 1996, 1997, 1998, 1999, 2000, 2001, 2002, 2003, 2004, 2005, 2007, 2008, 2018
- World Semi Final : 1995, 1998, 1999, 2000, 2001, 2002, 2004, 2005, 2007, 2009, 2010, 2012
- British : 1992, 1999, 2001, 2003, 2004, 2005, 2006, 2016, 2017
- European : 1995, 2006, 2014, 2022
- National Series : 2002, 2003, 2004, 2005, 2007, 2008
- Long Track / Gold Cup : 1998, 1999, 2006, 2015
- 240i NZ Championships : 1997, 2000, 2009
- Grand National : 1995, 1997, 2000, 2001, 2002, 2003, 2004, 2005, 2011, 2014, 2018, 2021
- UK Open : 2001, 2003, 2006, 2009
- Trust Fund : 1991, 1998, 2002, 2004
- BriSCA Supreme : 1991, 1993, 2010
- Scottish : 2000, 2001, 2002, 2003, 2004, 2005
- Grand Prix : 1998
- Bumper Trophy : 1990, 2001, 2004, 2006
- World of Shale : 1999, 2001, 2012

== Memorial Wins ==
- Tony Abel : 1995
- Richie Ahern : 1993, 2001, 2002, 2010
- Bozzy Ashes : 2006
- Allan Barker : 2006
- Wilf Blundell : 1996, 1998, 2000, 2002, 2004, 2011, 2013
- Steve Froggatt : 1999, 2001, 2003
- Roger Merrick : 2004, 2006
- Fred Mitchell : 1998, 2004, 2007, 2009, 2011
- Mike Parker : 2007, 2009, 2011
- Don Round : 2008
- Harry Smith : 2006, 2007, 2008
- Mark Wilkinson : 1997
- Lee Wilson : 2007, 2009
- Ernie Wright : 1993, 1995, 1998, 2005
- Mo Jones : 2018
