= Paul Harrison (racing driver) =

British racing driver

- Nationality: (United Kingdom) British
- Born: 4 April 1969 (age 57) Rotherham, South Yorkshire

BriSCA Formula 1 Stock Cars career
- Debut season: 1985
- Car number: 2

Previous series
- 1977-1984: Ministox

Paul Harrison (born 4 April 1969) is a BriSCA Formula 1 Stock Cars racing driver from Rotherham who races under number 2. Harrison is a former World Champion and one of the most recognisable figures in the sport.

== Early life ==
Harrison was born on 4 April 1969 in Rotherham. His father, Willie Harrison, was a popular Formula 1 Stock Car racing driver. Harrison began to follow in his father’s footsteps when he raced competitively for the first time in 1977 in a Ministox, at the age of 8. The promoter allowed Harrison to race despite being aware that he was below the minimum age requirement.

== Racing career ==
Harrison began racing Formula 1 stock cars at the age of 16 in August 1985, using one of his father’s cars and racing as number 22. The first few years were spent developing his skills. Harrison attained the red roof of a star grade driver in 1988, and in 1989 he won his first meeting final at Owlerton Stadium in Sheffield.

In 1991, after his father’s retirement, Harrison inherited the number 2. In the same year his first major championship success came at Buxton Raceway, where he started the British Championship race from pole position and retained first place at the finish. He won the same title for a second time in 1993.

More success followed when Harrison won the European Championship at Northampton International Raceway in both 1998 and 2003. However, the World Championship seemed to elude him. In the first 25 years of his racing career, he finished the World Final three times in second place, twice in third place, and three times in fourth place.

Harrison finally lost the unwanted honour of being the best driver not to win the World Final in 2011 in his 23rd attempt. It was part of his best season in stock car racing, which also saw him win a World Championship Semi-Final and the British Championship for a third time. He won the British Championship a fourth time in 2014.

== Honours ==
=== Championship wins ===
- World Champion: 2011
- World Championship Semi Final winner: 2003, 2008, 2011, 2014
- British Champion: 1991, 1993, 2011, 2014
- European Champion: 1998, 2003
- UK Open Champion: 1999
- Trust Fund Champion: 1989
- BriSCA Supreme : 2005
- Bumper Trophy : 2000

=== Memorial wins ===
- Richie Ahern: 1996
- Allan Barker: 2011
- Wilf Blundell: 2013
- Roger Merrick: 2001
- Fred Mitchell: 2001
- Mark Wilkinson: 1998
- Ernie Wright: 1997

=== Race wins ===
Figures accurate to the end of the 2014 season

- Number of finals won: 59
- Number of races won (inc. finals): 253
