= John Lund (racing driver) =

British racing driver (born 1954)

- Nationality: (United Kingdom) British
- Born: 12 January 1954 (age 72) Rimington, Lancashire

BriSCA Formula 1 Stock Cars career
- Debut season: 1976
- Car number: 53

John Lund (born 12 January 1954) is a BriSCA Formula 1 Stock Cars racing driver from Rimington, Lancashire who races under number 53. Lund is one of the most successful stock car drivers of all time and holds the current record for the most World Championship wins.

== Biography ==
Lund started racing in 1976, debuting at Rochdale on 28 March. He progressed to star grade in 1977, and to superstar in 1981. In 1985, Lund started racing two cars, one for shale ovals, one for tarmac. This helped catapult him to the very top of the sport.

In 1987 Lund won his first major title, the British Championship. He completed a sweep of the top three major championships when he won the World Championship at Belle Vue Stadium and the National Points Championship in the same year, the third person to achieve this feat.

Lund retained the World Championship in 1988 at Hednesford Hills Raceway, and won it again in 1991 and 1992. During the same period, he won the National Points Championship six consecutive times. He also won the Dutch-based Long Track World Championship, the British Championship and the European Championship.

Lund won the World Championship again in 1996, 1997, 2000 and 2002. His collection of eight World Championship titles is a record, more than any other driver in the history of the sport.

In 2004 Lund's eldest son, James Lund, started racing under number 153. In 2005 his second son, Sam Lund also started racing under number 531. Sam only raced in a few meetings before he died on 18 January 2007 from injuries sustained in a road traffic accident at the age of 19.

== Honours ==
- World Champion: 1987, 1988, 1991, 1992, 1996, 1997, 2000, 2002
- National Points Champion: 1987, 1988, 1989, 1990, 1991, 1992
- British Champion: 1987, 1989, 1990, 1995, 1997, 1998
- European Champion: 1989, 1992, 2002
- Long Track World Champion: 1990
- BriSCA Supreme Champion: 1989
- Grand National Champion: 1986, 1987, 1988, 1989, 1990, 1991, 1994, 1998
- Grand Prix Series Winner: 1987, 1988, 1990, 1993, 1997
- Scottish Champion: 1986
- UK Open Champion: 1990, 1992, 1994
