= BriSCA Formula 1 Stock Cars =

Class of single-seater stock-car-racing

BriSCA F1 Stock Cars
Category	Single seaters
Active since	1954
Country/region	United Kingdom The Netherlands
Engine	Unlimited capacity Chevrolet V8 engines Carburettor only Normally aspirated Cast iron block
Tyres	American Racer
World champion	(United Kingdom) 124 Kyle Gray
National points champion	(United Kingdom) 1 Tom Harris
British champion	(United Kingdom) 1 Tom Harris
European champion	(United Kingdom) 464 Joe Booth

BriSCA (British Stock Car Association) Formula 1 Stock Cars are a class of stock-car-racing in the UK with custom-built cars, with races conducted on walled oval tracks of either shale or tarmac of approximately a quarter-mile in length.

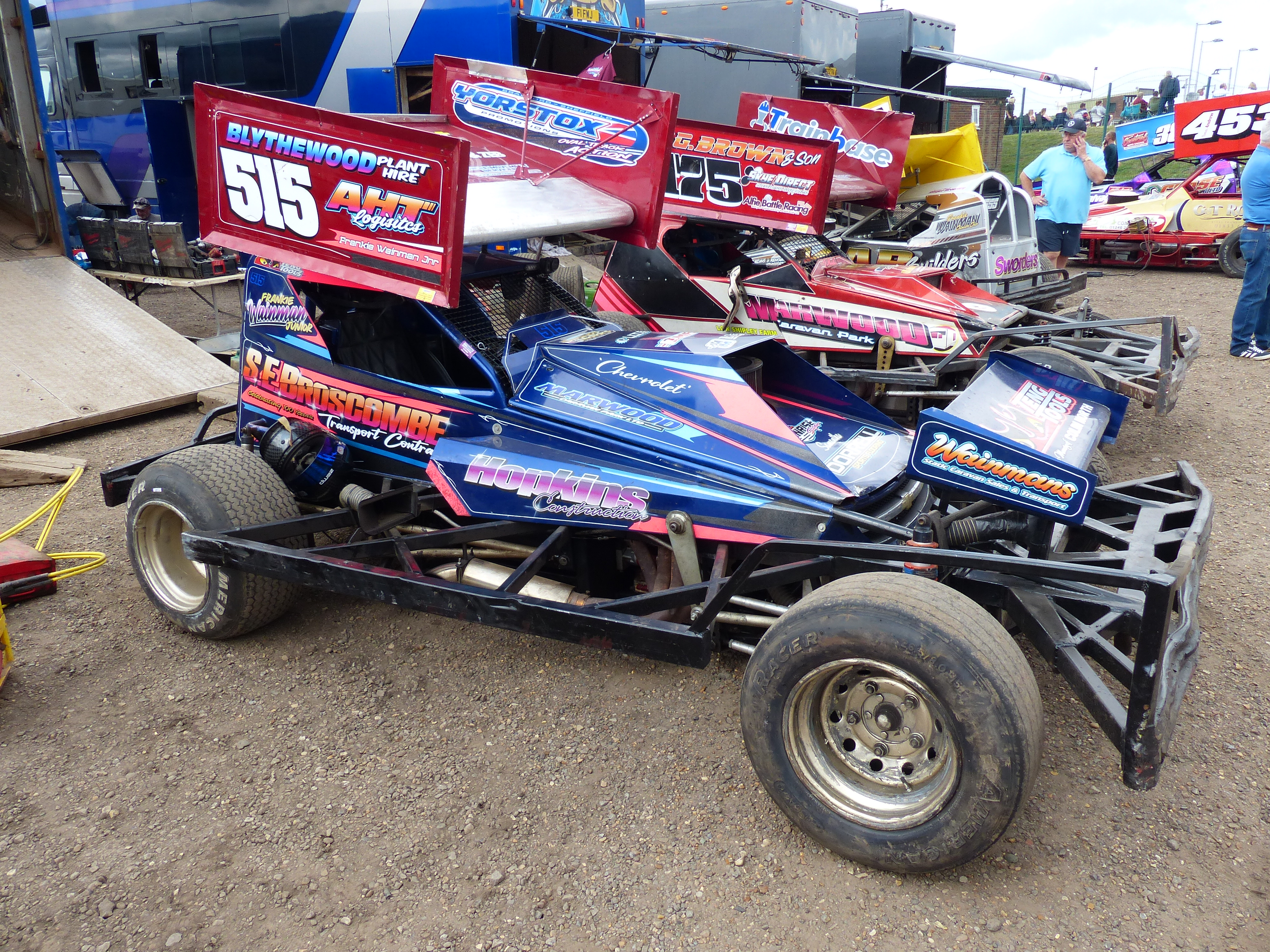
A BriSCA Formula 1 Stock Car

The cars follow open wheel design principles, and there are no horsepower restrictions for the engines. Drivers may use any engine they choose, with Chevrolet based small or big block V8 engines being the most popular. The season runs from March through to November, with occasional meetings over the Christmas period.

== History ==
BriSCA F1 Stock Car racing can trace its roots to the first stock car race in United Kingdom, which was held at New Cross Stadium in London on Good Friday, 16 April 1954, promoted by a Northampton-born Australian showman called Digger Pugh. It was hugely successful with two further meetings taking place at New Cross before the next meeting took place at Odsal Stadium, Bradford, on 26 May 1954. The new craze spread rapidly around the country and was dubbed the "seven day wonder". Originally, the cars were slightly modified saloon cars, hence the term stock as opposed to race cars. Most of the cars were American models with V8 engines, with some larger European cars. The cars were standard makes with wheel arches removed, and with bumpers added along with roll bars.

In 1956 the drivers' association was formed. In 1957, thanks to the efforts of Peter Arnold, a national numbering system was introduced, BriSCA, the association of promoters was formed and the Stock Car Racing Board of Control created. There was also an agreement that BriSCA would only use drivers of the drivers' association. From the initial explosion in 1954 things started to settle down, tracks opened and closed but racing rules were introduced and the cars became more refined, while star drivers started to emerge. BriSCA has raced continuously since 1954 and held over 5,500 meetings across the United Kingdom.

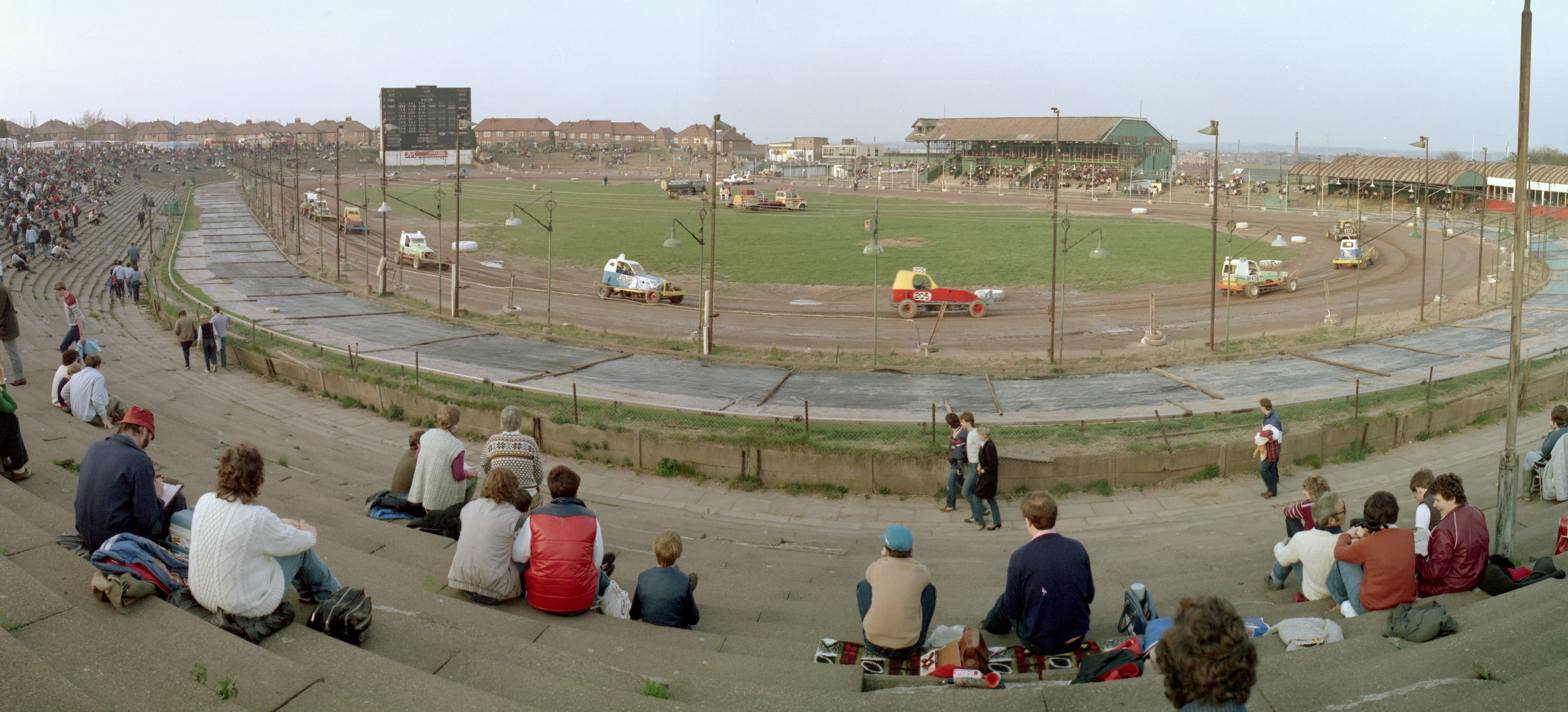
Race at Leicester Stadium in 1984

In 1975, about 30 southern based drivers broke away from BriSCA and formed their own association called SCOTA (Stock Car Oval Track Association). They were disappointed at the lack of F1 meetings being held in the south of the country. They raced for promoter Spedeworth in cars exactly the same as BriSCA F1. In 1978 it was renamed F1SCA (Formula One Stock Car Association). In 1980, F1SCA decided to introduce a five-litre limit, and make the cars slightly smaller. Renamed 'Formula 80' the cars ran until 2018 under the name 'Spedeworth V8 Stock Cars'.

In 2019 the Spedeworth V8 Stock Cars separated from all racing governing bodies and became an outlaw group. They now race as the 'V8 Stock Cars Tour' and race at tracks wherever they are welcome. In 2023 the sport has seen the addition of new drivers moving from the BriSCA V8 Hot Stox formula to the V8 Outlaw Tour.

Currently BriSCA F1 are governed by the British Stock Car (promoters) Association, Oval Racing Council International (ORCi), and Spedeworth International.

== Administration ==
BriSCA F1 Stock Cars are governed by the BriSCA Management Board, comprising three members of the association of promoters (BriSCA) and three members of the BSCDA (British Stock Car Drivers Association) together with an independent secretary. Rules and regulations relating to car specifications, race procedures, track requirements and all other aspects of the sport are updated annually by the BriSCA Management Board. All drivers wishing to race at a BriSCA F1 meeting have to be registered in advance by the BSCDA. All venues that stage BriSCA F1 racing must be licensed by BriSCA.

== Cars ==
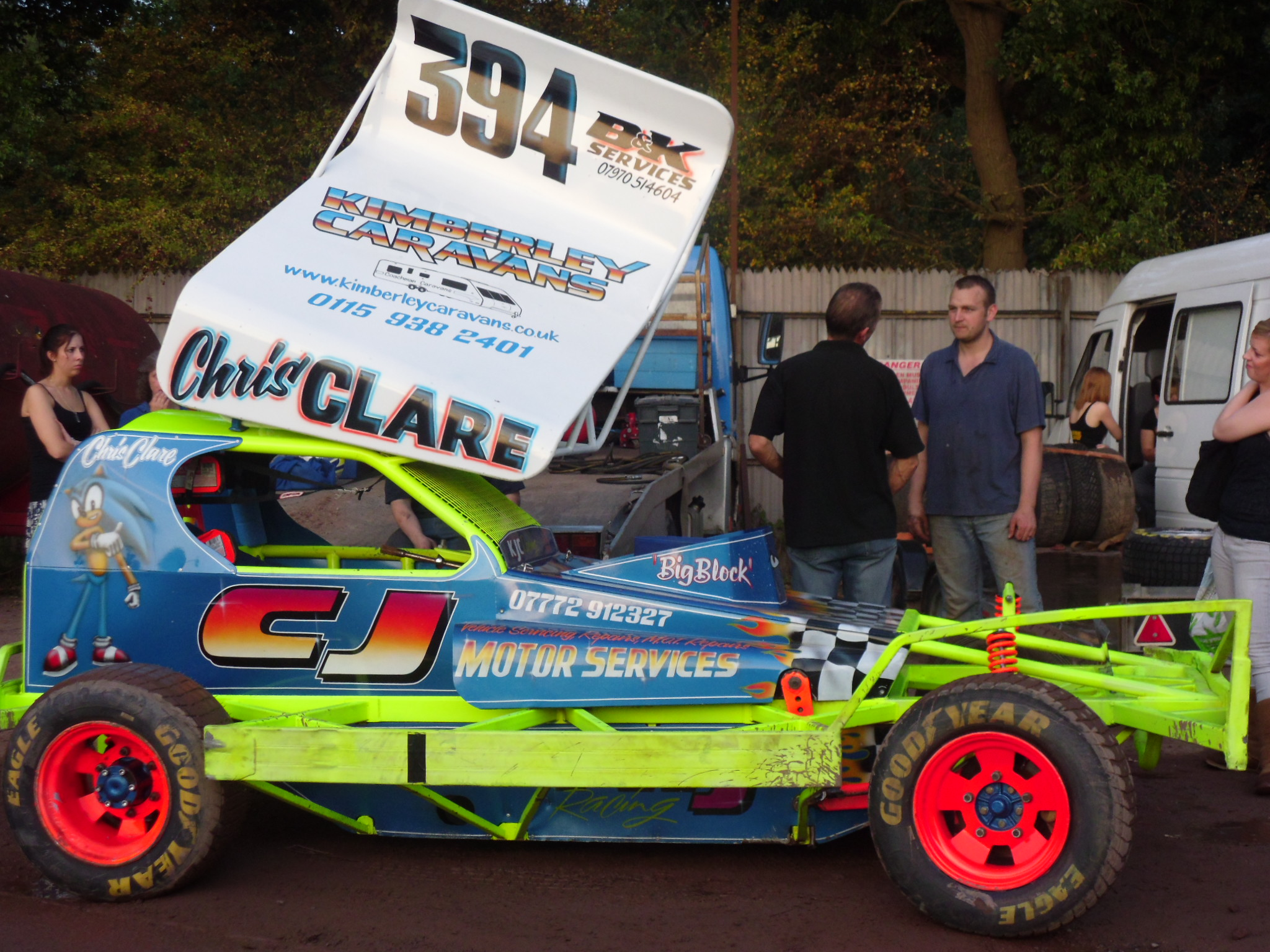
The BriSCA Formula 1 Stock Car of Chris Clare

During the 1960s, the cars developed from stock road cars into specially built cars with fabricated chassis and race-tuned V8 engines. While NASCAR in the US also races specially-built race cars, they retain the appearance of a road car, unlike the BriSCA F1 which now bears no resemblance to a road car.

A modern BriSCA F1 configuration is front-engined, rear-wheel drive, and open-wheeled, with the driver located centrally. The cars are constructed on race engineered steel ladder chassis with robust roll-over-safety cages and aluminium sheet body panelling, There is no limit in engine capacity or number of cylinders but engines must be naturally aspirated (no fuel injection, no supercharging or turbo charging permitted) and the engine blocks must be cast iron. The most common engines used, due to their reliability and availability, are based on the American Chevrolet V8 engine in both small block (350 ci) 5.7 litre and big block (454 ci) 7.4 litre varieties, producing upwards of 740 bhp with approximately 640 ft-lbs of torque but some cars are known to have been equipped with engines of 9 litre capacity (540 ci). Power is most typically delivered through a 'Doug Nash' style gearbox with two forward gears (one for racing) and reverse, and use a heavily modified Ford Transit rear axle with a Locking differential.

The cars use a control tyres on the outside rear manufactured by 'American Racer'. The cars are also restricted in what dampers can be used, to control costs. Cars can reach speeds of 80–90 mph around a quarter-mile oval, so most cars use large roof mounted aerofoils, similar to those found on American sprint cars, to create downforce on the corners and provide some extra cornering grip. Wings are not compulsory.

Cars must weigh between 1,350 and 1,500 kg and due to always racing anticlockwise, the cars are limited to having a maximum of 52% of the weight on the left hand side of the car when viewed from the rear. Cars are weighed at each meeting to make sure they conform to this rule.

Many drivers use two separate cars; one set up primarily for use on shale or dirt ovals, while the other car will be set up for tarmac or asphalt ovals. However, a few drivers with limited budgets may optimise just one car for both surface types, changing various components for each different track and surface.

== Spectating ==
Cars, drivers and their pit crews can be accessed, approached and watched while they prepare or repair cars between races, with drivers generally being happy to allow children to sit on or in their cars for photographs as well as to discuss how their racing is progressing.

== Tracks ==
The active UK tracks where BriSCA F1 stock cars race are:

- Aldershot - Rushmoor Arena
- Buxton
- Cowdenbeath - Central Park
- Hednesford Hills Raceway
- Ipswich - Foxhall Stadium
- King's Lynn Stadium
- Knockhill - Knockhill Tri-Oval Circuit
- Mildenhall Stadium
- Northampton Shaleway
- Nutts Corner Raceway, Northern Ireland
- Scunthorpe - Eddie Wright Raceway
- Sheffield - Owlerton Stadium
- Skegness Stadium
- Yarmouth Stadium

Both Cowdenbeath and Knockhill stage meetings biannually.

In 2026 the first meeting was held at Nutts Corner Raceway in Northern Ireland with #452 Joshua Spiers being crowned the inaugural Irish Champion.

Netherlands:

- Raceway Venray
- Blauwhuis Raceway
- Emmen Raceway

BriSCA F1 drivers also compete with their Dutch counterparts at Texel, Sint Maarten, Blauwhuis and Lelystad in the Netherlands and Warneton in Belgium.

=== Defunct tracks ===
The following tracks no longer host BriSCA F1. Some have been demolished, others continue to hold meetings for other formulae including BriSCA Formula 2 Stock Cars, Superstox and Banger racing:

- Aldershot Stadium - Tongham Stadium
- Aycliffe Stadium
- Barnsley
- Belle Vue, Hyde Road, Manchester
- Belle Vue Stadium
- Birmingham (Perry Barr)
- Birmingham Wheels Park
- Blackburn
- Bolton Raikes Park Greyhound Stadium
- Boston Sports Stadium
- Bradford - Odsal Stadium
- Bristol - Mendips Raceway
- Bristol - Knowle
- Cleethorpes
- Coventry Stadium
- Crayford Stadium
- Crewe Stadium
- Doncaster
- Dublin - Republic of Ireland
- Eastbourne - Arlington Stadium, Hailsham
- Edinburgh - Meadowbank Stadium
- Glasgow - Carntyne Stadium
- Harringay Stadium
- Hartlepool
- Leicester Stadium - Blackbird Road
- Long Eaton Stadium
- Neath Abbey
- Nelson - Seedhill Football Ground
- Newcastle, Brough Park
- Newtongrange (Scotland)
- New Cross Stadium
- Norwich
- Oxford Stadium
- Plymouth
- Prestatyn
- Purfleet
- Reading Stadium
- Rayleigh
- Ringwood Raceway
- Rochdale
- Rye House Stadium
- Scunthorpe - Ashby Ville Stadium
- Scunthorpe - Quibell Park Stadium
- Southampton
- St Austell
- Staines
- Stoke - Loomer Road Stadium
- Stoke - Sun Street, Hanley
- Swaffham Raceway
- Swindon Abbey Stadium (Swindon)
- Tamworth
- Walthamstow Stadium
- Wembley Stadium (1923)
- West Ham Stadium
- Weymouth
- White City Stadium (Manchester)
- White City Stadium, Glasgow
- Wimbledon Stadium
- Wisbech (SCOTA only)
- Wolverhampton
- Woolwich

Big tracks:

- Baarlo (Netherlands)
- Brands Hatch
- Cadwell Park
- Lydden Hill Race Circuit
- Mallory Park
- Snetterton Motor Racing Circuit

== Grading of drivers ==
Each driver is graded according to past results, their roof or wing painted accordingly.
Red roofs with amber flashing lights are known as 'Superstar' grade; then Red (star), Blue ('A' grade), Yellow ('B' grade) and White ('C' grade).
Every month during the season, the list is recompiled based on points scored at that month's meetings, and drivers move up and down according to their latest position. There are restrictions on movement down the grades based on limited meetings raced at, and the previous highest grade reached.
Novice drivers for their first three meetings are allowed to start at the back of the grid and show a black saltire on the rear cab panel, so that other drivers know to avoid deliberate contact with the new driver.

Championship winners are designated specific roof colours:

- Gold - World champion
- Silver - National points champion
- Black & White checks - British champion
- Red & Yellow checks - European champion
- Green & White checks - Irish Champion

If one driver wins more than one title, roof colours will be a combination of whatever titles have been won.

In stock car terminology, the roof colour will also be known as the 'top'; for example, cars with a white roof will be known as a 'white top' whereas a star driver will be termed a 'red top.'

Drivers are always referred to by their racing number and name, for example '53' John Lund. Drivers tend to carry their racing number throughout their careers. If they win the world championship they can choose to race as number '1' until the next world championship.

== Races ==
BriSCA F1 Stock Car races are normally held on short, approximately quarter-mile, oval tracks, either tarmac or shale. Heats usually consist of 16 laps, with meeting finals lasting 20 laps. Special events (such as the world final) are held over 25 laps.

The race line up is unique in that best drivers start at the rear of the field. The lowest, 'C' graded, drivers start each race at the front, then 'B', 'A' and 'star', while the 'superstars' start each race from the rear of the field. Championship races are usually gridded in qualifying order, with the highest qualifiers starting at the front of the grid.

The number of competitors at a meeting will usually aim to be around 60. The meetings usually consist of three heats (20 cars in each), a consolation race, a final and a grand national. The first eight from the heats qualify for the final. Those who do not qualify from the heats can race in the consolation race and the first six qualify for the final. The final usually consists of 30 cars, and the grand national race is open to all, with the winner of the final, if racing, given a one-lap handicap. If the number of cars racing is lower, around 40 cars, they can split the cars into a two-thirds format. Each driver races in two heats, with a compilation of points deciding who races in the final.

The grand national is an all-season competition with the points collected resulting in a one-off race at the end of the season for the 'grand national champion'

=== Use of contact ===
Stock car racing in the UK is often confused with banger racing where cars deliberately crash into each other. However, stock cars employ more subtle forms of contact where, typically, just enough force is employed to move the car in front wide to facilitate overtaking.

- Push: In this manoeuvre, a driver may contact the rear bumper of the car ahead with the front bumper of their own car, forcing the driver in front to overshoot a corner and "go wide" allowing overtaking. This is the most common form of overtaking employed and is most effective on corner entry.
- Last bender: This is a form of push which normally happens on the final bend of the last remaining lap and is one of the key elements of contact stock car racing and generates a lot of emotion and encouragement from the crowd. Drivers may employ long distance lunges or use of extra force, to gain places or to displace the car leading the race in order to take a win.
- Nerf: In this manoeuvre, a driver may contact the side (nerf) rails of the car ahead with the front bumper of their own car which may cause the driver in front to be unable to maintain the optimum racing line around the corner. This technique has become more common in recent years and is typically employed mid corner.
- Spin: An attacking driver may position their car such that they contact the rear of the car in front from the side causing the car ahead to lose traction and spin. This is a relatively unusual technique partly because of the risk to the attacker of being blocked by the car they have spun but also because it is considered unsporting due to the competitor being spun losing a number of race positions.
- Follow in: An illegal move which may result in disciplinary action, a 'follow in' involves a driver using such excessive force to push the car ahead that both parties overshoot the bend and run into the safety fence or barrier. This maneuver may be used for the purposes of settling a score (in the case of a racing feud) with another driver or to prevent another competitor from completing an important race.

=== Race signals ===
Races are carefully monitored by track marshals placed at intervals around the track and the individual known as the 'Starter', positioned on a rostrum at the start/finish line who issues instructions to competing drivers via a system of flags. Additionally, traffic light signals are placed at suitable positions around the raceway.

- Green flag/green light: Racing conditions commence or resume.
- Yellow flag (waved)/flashing yellow light: Racing conditions are suspended due to a hazard on track; drivers should slow down and maintain their race positions. Any overtaking may be penalised.
- Yellow flag (static): Usually indicated by marshals to warn drivers of a hazard on the track such as a stationary car.
- Black flag: Used to indicate to a driver that they are disqualified from the race, usually due to damage to their car but also due to rule-breaking.
- Union Jack: Displayed when half of the race distance has been completed.
- Lap boards: The number of laps remaining is displayed to drivers so they may understand when to employ a 'last bender' (or when to defend against one). It is most typical that the last five or three laps are indicated to competitors.
- Chequered flag: Shown to the race winner to indicate that they have completed the race distance first.
- Red flag/red light: Immediate stop to racing conditions due to a serious hazard such as a car in a barrier, lots of debris or adverse weather conditions. All cars must become stationary when safe to do so.

== World Championship ==
The World Championship is an annual competition and the premier stock car championship. The winner is granted the honour of racing with a gold roof and wing until the next World Final and may choose to race under number 1. The World Final is usually held in September. The host tracks, all of which are based in the UK, are chosen by the designated promoter.

The grid for the World Final is composed of drivers from the UK who are chosen through a series of qualifying rounds and two World Championship semi-finals. Drivers who fail to progress from the semi-finals may race again in a consolation semi-final to choose two more entrants, and the reigning world champion is entitled to start at the rear of the grid if they have not already qualified. The UK drivers are joined by stock car drivers from the Netherlands, and by invited drivers in the nearest equivalent motorsport formulas from other countries often including Australia, New Zealand, South Africa and the USA.

The most successful driver in world final races is John Lund, who has won eight. Other notable multiple winners include 391 Stuart Smith (six), 84 Tom Harris (six), 391 Andy Smith (five), 33 Peter Falding (four), 252 Dave Chisholm (three), 103 Johnny Brise (three), 515 Frankie Wainman Junior (three).

== National Points Championship ==
The National Points Championship is a season-long competition. The winner is granted the honour of racing with a silver roof for the following season.

The first season-long championship started in 1956. Drivers' scores at every stock car meeting were recorded to create the championship table. During the late 1990s, when Frankie Wainman Junior dominated, there was criticism that the National Points Championship was predictable and favoured drivers who had the money to race at as many meetings as possible. The National Series was created in 2002. Rather than the points accumulated over the entire season counting towards the winner, the National Series was competed for over 35 designated meetings. The season-long National Points Championship survived, but its importance was downgraded, and the privilege of racing with a silver roof for the following season was transferred from it to the National Series.

In 2009, the National Series was amended. This time, the top ten points-scoring drivers over the first two-thirds of the season were entered in the National Series Shootout, beginning with no points except for a small number of meeting attendance points. The drivers raced over ten designated shootout rounds, with the points scored in them deciding the winner of the National Series. In 2010, the number of competing drivers was increased to twelve. From 2012, the National Series Shootout was rebranded the National Points Championship Shootout.

The most successful driver in National Points Championships and National Series is 515 Frankie Wainman Junior, who has won fourteen. Other notable multiple winners include 391 Stuart Smith (thirteen), 53 John Lund (six), 38 Fred Mitchell (three), 391 Andy Smith (three) and 212 Frankie Wainman (three).

== Media ==
The 1980s saw BriSCA F1 Stock Cars on national television, featured on ITV's World of Sport. During 2009, the BBC filmed an F1 Stock Car season almost in its entirety to produce a six-part television documentary titled Gears and Tears which featured the bitter battle between the two dominant clans in the sport, the Yorkshire-based Wainmans and the Lancashire-based Smiths. Over the nine-month season the film makers enjoyed unprecedented behind the scenes access. From 2011, satellite television channel Premier Sports began broadcasting selected meetings. Since September 2017, FreeSports (Freeview, FreeSat) have broadcast BriSCA F1 meetings with no payment to view required.

== PC simulation ==
Simulation of BriSCA F1 stock car (and other oval formulas) racing can be played on a PC via specially created 'mods', which exist for both the Nascar Heat and rFactor motor racing simulation game engines. rFactor requires a relatively recent PC specification. Racing can be simulated either off-line (against computer controlled cars) or on-line, with some organised racing leagues existing that mimic the real life racing fixture list and drivers in the leagues may opt to use replicas of real life cars or personalised 'skins' created using popular graphical editing tools. Accurately modelled stock car tracks that are either current or defunct may be downloaded for the modifications allowing for contemporary or nostalgic racing.

There is also a game on Xbox One called Stockcars Unleashed 2. It uses real car liveries, drivers and UK ovals and a championship racing format.

SSCN and Last Bend Racing use a modified version of the 2000 NASCAR HEAT game.

Wreckfest have download content (DLC) with an F1 stock car type car. Mods can help the car perform as it does in real life.
