= Raceway Venray =

Race track in Venray, Netherlands

- Outer Oval (2009–present)
- Location: Venray, Netherlands
- Coordinates: 51°31′15.07″N 5°52′40.55″E
- Capacity: 10,000
- Owner: Harry Maessen
- Operator: Stichting Raceway Venray
- Broke ground: 2008
- Opened: 1977 (motocross track); 1989 (oval); 2009 (new location)
- Construction cost: Approx. €3,708,000
- Architect: Architektenburo Olieslagers B.V.
- Former names: Circuit de Peel (1989–2008)
- Major events: Former: NASCAR Whelen Euro Series (2015–2017, 2019, 2024); FIM MXGP (1982, 1986)
- Website: http://www.racewayvenray.com

Outer Oval (2009–present)
- Surface: Asphalt
- Length: 0.805 km (0.500 mi)
- Turns: 4
- Race lap record: 0:19.033 ( (Netherlands) Frank Wouters, 2014, LMV8 Supercup)

Inner Oval
- Surface: Asphalt
- Length: 0.402 km (0.250 mi)
- Turns: 4
- Race lap record: 0:13.320 ( (Netherlands) Jeffrey Zwiep, 2016, National Hot Rod)

Karting Track
- Surface: Asphalt
- Turns: 13

Raceway Venray, formerly known as Circuit de Peel, is a motorsport racing circuit in Venray, Netherlands. The track consists of a banked half mile oval with a flat quarter mile oval inside and features a karting track using portions of both along with dedicated sections. The track host its own local championships, national championships in cooperation with the Midland Circuit in Lelystad and Circuit de Polderputten in Ter Apel.

The track is owned by Harry Maessen, a local business owner who is also involved in several other motorsports projects, including the BRL V6 and BRL Light series, Funpark Meppen and Acceleration 2014.

== History ==
=== M.C.V. Janslust ===
In 1961 the local people started hosting motocross races in the village of Heide, Venray. The goal was to raise money for a church, the current church of Immaculate Conception. More than a hundred motocross racers attended the first event on June 25, 1961. Motocross Club Janslust was founded to host the races under the sanctioning of the Roman Catholic Dutch Touring Club (the Roman Catholic variant of the Royal Dutch Touring Club). The motocross became a yearly event, and was run annually for more than twenty years. However, the motocross of 1982 was canceled due to bad weather, and in 1983 the organisation was dissolved. The loss of 6,500 guilders was a heavy burden for the organisation. The board of the organisation decided to end the motocross activities.

=== Stichting Moto-Cross Venray ===
After the dissolution of M.C.V. Janslust, motocross halted in the area. Former members Johan van Dijck, Jan Derikx and Harry Maessen founded a new private foundation in 1983, Stichting Moto-Cross Venray. The owner of the track in Heide did not allow any new motocross activities. The new foundation first wanted to host races at Castenray but eventually settled in Ysselsteyn. The foundation expanded the already existing facilities of Motor Cross Club Venray which had been in use since 1977. The track was expanded to a length of 1,500 meters and renamed Circuit de Peel. The track was located near the Lieutenant General Best Barracks. The first race of the new organisation was held in 1984. Under sanctioning of the KNMV and the FIM the first race was held on February 5, 1984. The international Pullshaw Nederland Trophy was attended by many international riders such as Kees van der Ven and Heinz Kinigadner. In its first years most races at Circuit de Peel were sanctioned by the International Motor Bike Association.

=== Start of oval racing ===
Map of the old Circuit de Peel

At the end of 1989 the Circuit de Peel lost its licence to host the Motocross World Championship Grand Prix. As this reduced the income of the track Harry Maessen decided to add an oval track. On the 18th of August 1990 the inaugural races at the oval track were held. The track was 470 meters long and was made out of concrete. Track owner Maessen participated in the Super Stock class. In 1991 the first Superstox World Championship was held by the Spedeworth organisation. Darren Innocent won the prestigious race at Circuit de Peel. The track was paved with asphalt in the winter of 1995/1996. A karting track was laid out in the infield of the oval track and also an autocross event was hosted at the oval. In 1999 the track started working with another oval track in the province of Limburg the JaBa Circuit. The coöperation made it possible for racing drivers to run both track championships without missing races. After the closure of Circuit de Berckt the Circuit de Peel had a big increase in drivers and spectators. The track was extended to a length of 520 meters.

In 2005 stockcar racing in mainland Europe suffered a major loss. During the highly prestigious Stockcar F1 World Cup at Circuit de Peel one of the drivers suffered a fatal accident. Piet Keijzer from Helmond had a flat tire in the outside lane. Keijzer spun and whilst approaching the infield had a head-on collision with Ed Neachell. Keijzer died from injuries sustained in the crash. It was the first and only deadly racing accident at Circuit de Peel.

=== Illegality ===
The racetrack was never included in the land-use planning but the municipality allowed the circuit to operate in order to prevent motorcyclists taking to the woods and causing more nuisance. Since 1993 the track lied within the "Ecologische Hoofdstrucuur", a network of nature reserves with restrictions on what could be done inside them, was implemented by the Dutch Government and the provinces, leading to the circuit not only operating without a license but also in an area where it could never be allowed to. During an inspection by the Ministry of Housing, Spatial Planning and the Environment the commission decided that the track had to cease its activities. The council of the local province decided that a replacement venue had to be found before the track would be closed. It was decided that a new venue had to be found before 2006 or a fine of €200,000 would be imposed. Three new venues were proposed, these were all declined. In January 2006, however, the King's Commissioner Léon Frissen allowed the track to continue activities for six months. The case in which various ecological societies demanding the local government to close the racetrack even went to court. The track was closed by the court in 2008. Two races were allowed to be run on the illegal race track. This caused a stir in local politics, both races were eventually canceled. In March 2008 Maessen built an oval track near the town of Oirlo without permission of the municipality. The entrepreneur Maessen was ordered to demolish the track within one week, an order which he obeyed. An illegal, unorganized, kart race was held on March 16. This caused further political unrest, especially from the SP. After the incident the council of the municipality decided to close of the old track with containers. The track was demolished in November 2008.

=== New circuit ===
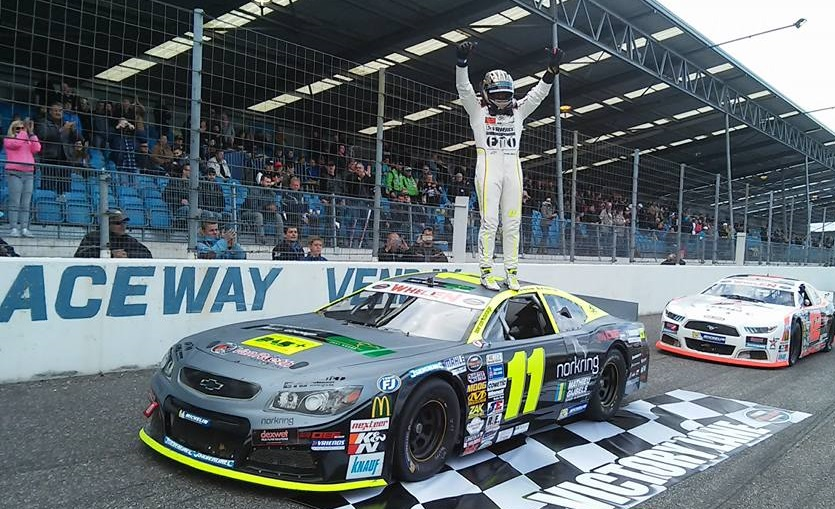
Stienes Longin won both races of the NASCAR Whelen Euro Series Elite 2 class in 2016

In February 2007 an agreement was reached to move the old circuit De Peel across the road from the old complex. For this move a pig farm had to be moved. Maessen bought the pig farm and surrounding plot for €1,100,000. In return, the pig farmer bought a plot to continue his farm from Maessen for €410,000.

The new quarter mile oval opened on Whit Monday 2009 with a demonstration event. The 2009 season only saw one race weekend at the track for the World Cups for BriSCA Formula 1 and Formula 2 Stock Cars. For the 2010 season the track only opened for the World Cup weekend again. Between the 2010 World Cup and the races on Whit Monday in 2011, the track was severely overhauled and the half mile oval was built around the quarter mile oval, which now had to share half of the width of its front stretch with the outer oval, a feature not liked by drivers in short-track classes. Although the track still had no full license, event licenses were obtained for four events in each of the 2011, '12 and '13 seasons. Over the 2011-2012 winter the short oval was shortened by bringing the straights closer together and a wall was constructed between the inner and outer oval.

At the end of 2013 a license was obtained allowing for 11 days of limitless noise and limited noise from events on other days. Ahead of the 2014 season the turn 1 grandstand was covered. The 2014 racing schedule expanded to seven races and first featured two rounds of the UK's Pickup Truck Racing Series. Midway through the season the infield grandstand was moved from the backstretch of the inner oval to turn 4 and part of a pedestrian bridge over the exit of turn 4 of the outer oval was constructed in order to allow spectators to go to and from the infield during races as well, though the bridge was not completed in 2014. Motocross also made its return in 2014, with the otherwise empty infield of turns 3 and 4 along with the back stretch of the oval being converted to a motocross track for the MON's International Youth Weekend. The full karting circuit was likewise first used in 2014, though sections inside the short oval's walls had been used previously already.

== Series and events ==
The primary spectator events at the track are stockcar races on the inner and outer ovals. During these, several races for local championships are held, though some events feature races for guest series. Besides these events, the track is also used for racing and drifting courses, club meetings, kart races and courses and races and motocross races.

=== Regular Series ===
Several local championships are held at the track. Some categories also run at associated tracks for which a separate championship is also awarded encompassing all tracks. Each local championship has a feature event at one race day each year. The following classes have local championships in Venray:

==== LMV8 Supercup ====
Year	Champion
2013	(Netherlands) Patrick den Biggelaar
2014	(Netherlands) Patrick den Biggelaar
2015	(Netherlands) Frank Wouters
2016	(Australia) Gerhard Newman

The LMV8 Supercup is the regular series at the half mile oval. It is the successor of the European Late Model Series. The LMV8 Supercup was introduced in 2013. The series features modern late model, such as Lefthander, Tanner and Howe, and older ASCAR chassis. All cars must be fitted with GM crate engine or GM LS1 engine. The inaugural season featured many drivers from the ASCAR series 2015 series such as Kieran Dynes. Dynes suffered a hard crash at Raceway Venray after which he retired from racing The following season more Dutch drivers joined the series such as Barry Maessen and Joey Hanssen. The championship in 2014 was a battle between Big Tuned Racing teammates Frank Wouters and Patrick den Biggelaar. Den Biggelaar won in 2014, while Wouters won the championship in 2015. 2015 series champion Frank Wouters holds the official half mile track record, beating the NASCAR Whelen Euro Series as well as Pickup Truck Racing.

==== Inner oval ====
- BriSCA Formula 1 Stock Cars, Dutch Tarmac Series with NOV Lelystad, qualifying for World Final
- BriSCA Formula 2 Stock Cars, Dutch Tarmac Series with NOV Lelystad, qualifying for World Final
- NHRRG National Hot Rods, NHRRG Cup with NOV Lelystad and NNO Ter Apel

=== Guest Series ===
Several events also have guest appearances from other series that might not have a local championship at Raceway Venray but instead run races at several tracks.

==== Outer Oval ====
- NASCAR Whelen Euro Series
- Pickup Truck Racing

==== Inner Oval ====
- Spedeworth 2 Litre Hot Rods, in conjunction with NNO Ter Apel, run clockwise
- 2 Litre Saloon Stock Cars
- BriSCA National Ministox
- BMW 325i Cup, in conjunction with NNO Ter Apel

=== Former series ===
==== European Late Model Series ====
The European Late Model Series used to be a regular guest but before the 2013 season the series split resulting in the Late Model V8 Supercup run by Raceway Venray as a local championship and the CAMSO V8 series run by CAMSO at its own track in Warneton and at Ipswich, Hednesford and Lydden Hill. In 2013 eight ELMS races were competed. Patrick den Biggelaar was the most successful driver winning five races.

==== BRL V6 ====
The BRL V6 was a series founded by track owner Harry Maessen in 2004. The series used silhouette Ford Mondeo bodies mounted on tube chassis. The cars were powered by Ford 4.0L V6 engine. The series ran at regular circuits, such as Zandvoort and Zolder, between 2004 and 2009. Following 2009 the cars were allowed to enter the Dutch Supercar Challenge. For 2010 Maessen decided to host a new BRL V6 series at Raceway Venray on the new half mile oval. Many well known Dutch racing drivers participated, such as Cor Euser and Donny Crevels. The first two seasons were won by former Formula Ford Festival winner Jacky van der Ende, the 2013 season was won by Renger van der Zande.

==== Formula Toyota ====
Classes that had previously run as local championships but have since not run at Venray include Formula Toyota, which last ran in 2010.

== Stockcar F1 and F2 World Cup ==
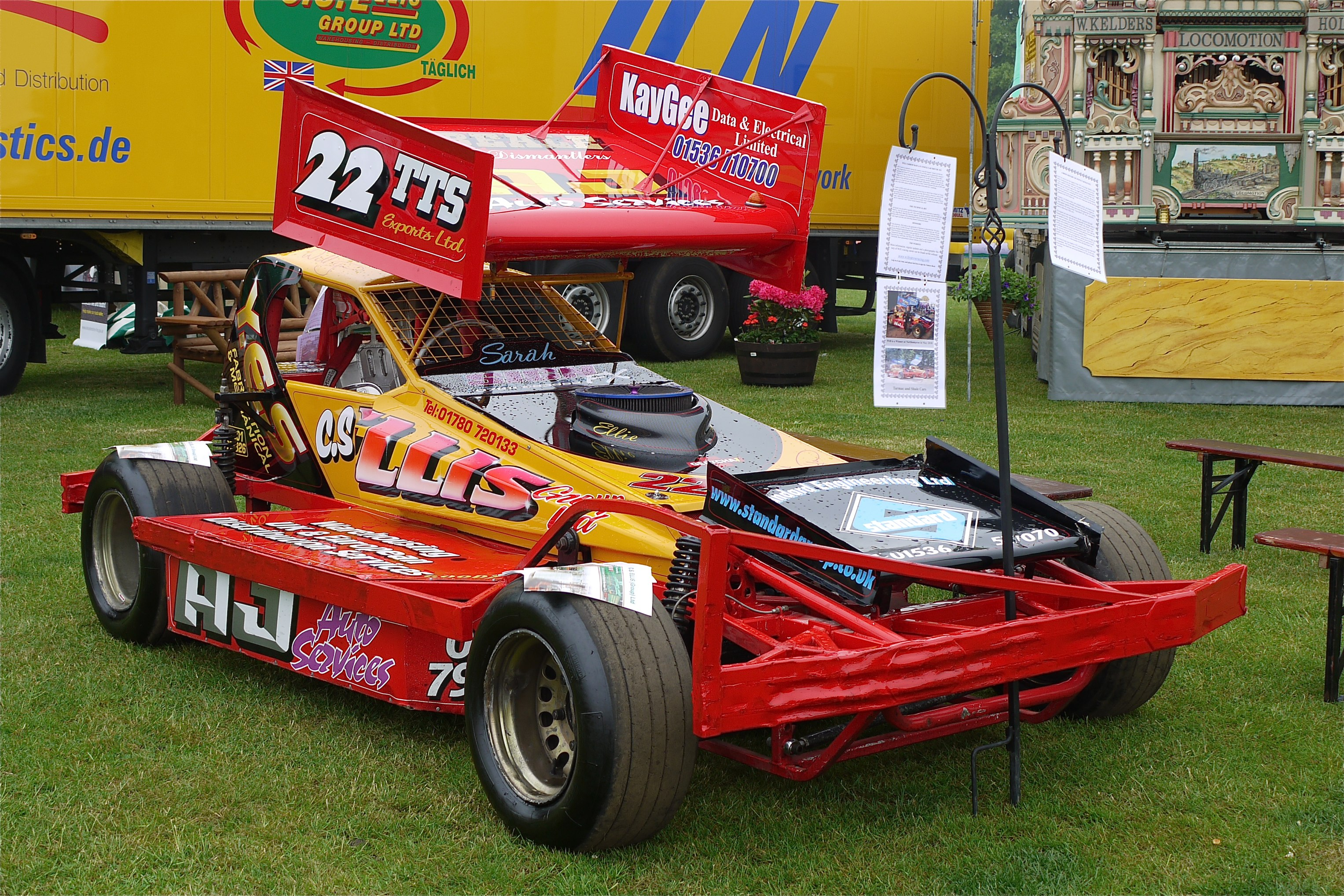
Stock car Formula 1 car similar to the cars used in the F1 World Cup.

Since the tracks initiation several prestigious non-championship races have been held at Circuit de Peel and subsequently Raceway Venray. The BriSCA Formula 1 Stock Cars made their debut at Raceway Venray in 1992. The first World Cup race was held in 2001. The World Cup is a highly prestigious battle between British drivers and drivers from continental Europe. The high tensions have resulted in many heavy crashes and injuries. In 2005 the event was marred by the deadly crash of Piet Keijzer. In 2014 another heavy crash involving Dutch driver Theo van Lier and British driver Tom Harris occurred. Van Lier suffered heavy injuries and was transported by air ambulance to the Radboud UMC. In 2016 the World Cup F1 was won by Dutch driver Roy Maessen (nephew of track owner Harry Maessen), the first Cup F1 win for a Dutch driver since 2009.

Year	Stockcar F1	Stockcar F2
2001	(Netherlands) Henk-Jan Rönitz	(United Kingdom) Rob Speak
2002	(Netherlands) Willie Peeters	(Netherlands) Toon Schut
2003	(Netherlands) Henk-Jan Rönitz	(Netherlands) Willie Peeters
2004	(Netherlands) Henk-Jan Rönitz	(Netherlands) Toon Schut
2005	(Netherlands) Piet Keijzer^{1}	(Netherlands) Toon Schut
2006	(United Kingdom) Frankie Wainman Jnr	(Netherlands) Toon Schut
2007	(Netherlands) Ron Kroonder	(United Kingdom) Gordon Moodie
2008	(Netherlands) Louw Wobbes	(United Kingdom) Gordon Moodie
2009	(Netherlands) Ron Kroonder	(United Kingdom) Gordon Moodie
2010	(United Kingdom) Gary Castell	(Netherlands) Toon Schut
2011	(United Kingdom) Gary Castell	(Netherlands) Christian Weyenberg
2012	(United Kingdom) Tom Harris	(Germany) Peter Baer
2013	(United Kingdom) Tom Harris	(Netherlands) Sebastiaan Vowinkel
2014	(United Kingdom) Dan Johnson	(United Kingdom) Gordon Moodie
2015	(United Kingdom) Frankie Wainman Jnr	(United Kingdom) Gordon Moodie
2016	(Netherlands) Roy Maessen	(Netherlands) Rick Lenssen
2017	(United Kingdom) Ryan Harrison	(Belgium) Jan Bekkers
2018	(Netherlands) Roy Maessen	(Netherlands) Kay Lenssen

=== Notes ===
^1 Keijzer was awarded the World Cup posthumously after his fatal crash during the 2005 main event.

== Motocross World Championship results ==
Year	500cc	250cc	125cc
1982	not run	not run	(Belgium) Marc Velkeneers
1982	not run	not run	(Belgium) Eric Geboers
1986	not run	(France) Jacky Vimond	not run
1986	not run	(Netherlands) Gert-Jan van Doorn	not run

== NASCAR Whelen Euro Series results ==
Year	Class	Driver	Team	Make
2015	Elite 1	(Italy) Nicolo Rocca	CAAL Racing	Chevrolet SS
2015	Elite 1	(Belgium) Anthony Kumpen	PK Carsport	Chevrolet SS
2015	Elite 2	(Austria) Philipp Lietz	GDL Racing	Ford Mustang
2015	Elite 2	(Austria) Philipp Lietz	GDL Racing	Ford Mustang
2016	Elite 1	(France) Frédéric Gabillon	RDV Compétition	Ford Mustang
2016	Elite 1	(Belgium) Anthony Kumpen	PK Carsport	Chevrolet SS
2016	Elite 2	(Belgium) Stienes Longin	PK Carsport	Chevrolet SS
2016	Elite 2	(Belgium) Stienes Longin	PK Carsport	Chevrolet SS
2017	Elite 1	(Belgium) Anthony Kumpen	PK Carsport	Chevrolet SS
2017	Elite 1	(Spain) Borja García	Alex Caffi Motorsport	Ford Mustang
2017	Elite 2	(Brazil) Felipe Rabello	CAAL Racing	Chevrolet SS
2017	Elite 2	(Brazil) Felipe Rabello	CAAL Racing	Chevrolet SS
2019	Elite 1	(Netherlands) Loris Hezemans	Hendriks Motorsport	Ford Mustang
2019	Elite 2	(Italy) Vittorio Ghirelli	PK Carsport	Chevrolet Camaro
2024	EN PRO	(Netherlands) Liam Hezemans	Hendriks Motorsport	Toyota Camry
2024	EN 2	(Czech Republic) Martin Doubek	Hendriks Motorsport	Ford Mustang

== Track records ==
Track records on the 0.5 miles (0.88 km) oval are as follows.

Series	Year	Date	Driver	Car Make	Time	Avg Speed
Late Model V8 Supercup	2014	26 October 2014	(Netherlands) Frank Wouters	Chevrolet	0:19.033	166.448 km/h (103.426 mph)
NASCAR Whelen Euro Series	2019	14 July 2019	(Canada) Jacques Villeneuve	Chevrolet	0:19.559	
BRL V6	2013	1 April 2013	(Netherlands) Patrick Peeters	Ford	0:20.119	157.463 km/h (97.843 mph)
BRL V6 Pick-Up	2015	24 May 2015	(Netherlands) Frank Wouters	Ford	0:20.607	153.734 km/h (95.526 mph)
Pickup Truck Racing	2014	5 July 2014	(England) Pete Wilkinson	Vauxhall	0:21.616	146.558 km/h (91.067 mph)
Mazda MX-5 Cup	2017	23 October 2017	(Netherlands) Isaac van der Slik	Mazda MX-5 NA	0:23.322	123.488 km/h (76.732 mph)

Track records on the 0.25 miles (0.33 km) oval are as follows.

Series	Year	Date	Driver	Car Make	Time	Avg Speed
NHRRG National Hot Rods	2016	16 May 2016	(Netherlands) Jeffrey Zwiep	Ford	0:13.320	89.189 km/h (55.419 mph)
BriSCA Formula 2 Stock Cars	2016	16 May 2016	(Netherlands) Kay Lenssen	Ford	0:13.895	85.498 km/h (53.126 mph)
BriSCA Formula 1 Stock Cars	2016	28 March 2016	(Netherlands) Sjeng Smidt Jr.	Chevrolet	0:13.929	85.290 km/h (52.997 mph)
Spedeworth 2 Litre Hot Rods	2017	17 April 2017	(United Kingdom) David Leech	Vauxhall	0:14.171	83.833 km/h (52.091 mph)
BMW 325i Cup	2016	27 October 2016	(Netherlands) Dudo de Bruijn	BMW	0:15.857	74.920 km/h (46.553 mph)
BriSCA National Ministox	2016	21 August 2016	(England) Courtney Witts	Mini	0:16.257	73.076 km/h (45.407 mph)

Track records on the 0.25 miles (0.44 km) oval before re-configuration were as follows.

Series	Year	Date	Driver	Car Make	Time	Avg Speed
BriSCA Formula 1 Stock Cars	2013	27 October 2013	(England) Neil Scothern	Chevrolet	0:14.486	109.347 km/h (67.945 mph)
NHRRG National Hot Rods	2014	17 August 2014	(Netherlands) Ralph Verberkt	Ford	0:14.503	109.219 km/h (67.866 mph)
BriSCA Formula 2 Stock Cars	2013	27 October 2013	(Netherlands) Sebastiaan Vowinkel	Ford	0:14.941	106.017 km/h (65.876 mph)
Spedeworth 2 Litre Hot Rods	2015	6 April 2015	(Netherlands) Martijn Vowinkel	Citroën	0:15.480	102.326 km/h (63.582 mph)
2 Litre Saloon Stock Cars	2015	28 June 2015	(Netherlands) Frankie van Riet	Ford	0:17.585	90.077 km/h (55.971 mph)
BMW 325i Cup	2015	27 September 2015	(Netherlands) Thomas Veldkamp	BMW	0:17.675	89.618 km/h (55.686 mph)
BriSCA National Ministox	2014	16 August 2014	(England) Courtney Witts	Mini	0:17.992	88.039 km/h (54.705 mph)

== See also ==
- Other Oval Circuits in Europe:
  - Lausitzring
  - Rockingham Motor Speedway
  - Tours Speedway
