= Aycliffe Stadium =

Sports venue in County Durham, England

- Location: Grindon Way, near Aycliffe Village
- Coordinates: 54°35′38.1″N 1°34′32.1″W
- Operator: Stock Cars (mid 1950s-1989); Greyhound racing (1946-1960)
- Opened: 1946

Aycliffe Stadium was a sports facility located in County Durham, England, on the southern edge of the Aycliffe Industrial Estate, which has Newton Aycliffe to the North and Aycliffe Village to the South. The stadium was originally used for greyhound racing and then speedway before stock car racing.

== Stock Cars ==
It was a short (370 yard) oval tarmac race track, which was used for stock car racing from the mid-1950s until it was closed at the end of 1989. The most regular formula to appear at Aycliffe Stadium was the BriSCA Formula 1 Stock Cars, closely followed by the smaller BriSCA Formula 2 Stock Cars category. National Saloon Stock Car Racing and Banger racing were also regularly held at Aycliffe, along with the occasional Demolition Derby, and the occasional demonstration visit from Autograss formula and Hot Rods (oval racing). The site was used each year for the town's firework display on Guy Fawkes Night.

For many Aycliffe is remembered as the Action Track. Aycliffe's tight corners and its suspended steel rope fence, combined with BriSCA's brand of contact racing regularly produced an action-packed spectacle. For most of its history, the stadium was associated with the British Stock Car Association (BriSCA). The first BriSCA licensed race took place on 10 July 1966, and the final BriSCA event was held on 19 November 1989.

On Good Friday, 16 April 1954, the first stock car race in Great Britain took place in London at New Cross Stadium. The sport was an instant success and races took place all over the country. Until recently, it is widely believed that the first Stock Car meeting at Aycliffe took place on 7 October 1956. However, photographs from 1955 of a driver's presentation evening at the North Briton Pub (in Aycliffe Village) suggest that stock car racing had already taken place at Aycliffe in 1955. In 1957, Jimmy Wilkinson took over as the promoter at Aycliffe. He retained control of the stadium until 1964, when he handed the role of promoter over to three regular Aycliffe drivers - Tony Neal (100), Ron 'Dixie' Dean (20), and Tom Geldard (154).

In 1966, the three brought Aycliffe Stadium into the BriSCA organisation. July 10 was the first licensed meeting. In 1975 Tony Neal emigrated to New Zealand, leaving Tom, Ron and Cissy Dean to run Aycliffe. In the early 1970s, Aycliffe ran a local formula call Supercars, but by 1976 this formula had been replaced by regular F2 racing. At the end of 1985 Ron and Cissy Dean retired from promoting. Jimmy Wilkinson returned to the helm and promoted the stock car racing at Aycliffe until it closed at the end of 1989 to make way for the expanding industrial estate.

=== BriSCA F1 Final Winners at Aycliffe ===
1966 - 11 Meetings - Ron Rogers 5, Ellis Ford 2, Tony Neal, Tom Geldard, Jimmy Young, Arthur Gibson

1967 - 17 Meetings - Tony Neal 7, Arthur Gibson 3, Ron Rogers 2, Ellis Ford, Ernie Dent, Earl Testo, Doug Cronshaw, Oliver Smith

1968 - 15 Meetings - Tony Neal 4, Tom Geldard 3, Ellis Ford, Arthur Gibson, Ernie Dent, Mike Holt, Bert Shipman, Chas Finnikin, Brian Wignall

1969 - 18 Meetings - Stuart Smith 6, Arthur Gibson 3, Jim Esau 2, Tony Neal, Tom Geldard, Jimmy Young, Oliver Smith, Doug Cronshaw, Bert Shipman, Warren Taylor

1970 - 16 Meetings - Stuart Smith 4, Jim Esau 2, Tony Neal, Arthur Gibson, Ernie Dent, Earl Testo, Doug Cronshaw, Bert Shipman, Pat Byrne, Willie Houseman, Derek Coleman, George Ansell

1971 - 14 Meetings - Stuart Smith 5, Tony Neal 3, Mike Holt 2, Jim Esau, Jim Donaldson, Willie Harrison, Brian Wignall

1972 - 15 Meetings - Stuart Smith 5, Doug Cronshaw 3, Tony Neal, Bert Shipman, Willie Harrison, Gordon Smith, Ray Watkins, Rod Falding, Gerald Taylor

1973 - 14 Meetings - Stuart Smith 8, Doug Cronshaw 3, Dave Fox, Alan Barker, Brian Wignall

1974 - 12 Meetings - Stuart Smith 4, John Hillam 3, Warren Taylor, Gordon Smith, Mike Close, Brian Wallace, Len Wolfenden

1975 - 11 Meetings - Stuart Smith 5, Doug Cronshaw 2, John Hillam 2, Willie Harrison, Gordon Smith

1976 - 13 Meetings - Stuart Smith 6, Mike Close 3, Doug Cronshaw, Willie Harrison, Frankie Wainman, Phil Hayhurst

1977 - 12 Meetings - Stuart Smith 7, Alan Barker 2, Mike Close, Willie Harrison, Frankie Wainman

1978 - 13 Meetings - Stuart Smith 7, Mike Close, Willie Harrison, Frankie Wainman, Gerald Taylor, Martin Farrar, Dave Hodgson

1979 - 12 Meetings - Stuart Smith 3, Len Wolfenden 2, Frankie Wainman 2, Brian Powles, Alan Barker, Mike Close, Andy Stott

1980 - 12 Meetings - Mike Close 4, Willie Harrison 3, Stuart Smith 3, Frankie Wainman 2

1981 - 13 Meetings - Len Wolfenden 5, Stuart Smith 3, Mike Close 2, Andy Stott 2, Trevor Todd

1982 - 13 Meetings - John Toulson 5, Mike Close 4, Andy Stott 3, George Wilkins

1983 - 13 Meetings - Mike Close 3, John Lund 3, Andy Stott 2, Len Wolfenden 2, John Toulson, Dan Clarke

1984 - 11 Meetings - Frankie Wainman 3, Mike Close 2, Andy Stott 2, John Lund 2, John Toulson, Harry Smith

1985 - 11 Meetings - Mike Close 3, Len Wolfenden 3, Richard Ainsworth 2, Harry Smith, John Lund, Ray Tyldesley

1986 - 11 Meetings - John Lund 6, John Toulson 2, Mike Close, Arthur Gibson, Frankie Wainman

1987 - 11 Meetings - John Lund 8, Ray Tyldesley, Doug Cronshaw, John Toulson

1988 - 10 Meetings - John Toulson 5, Peter Falding 2, John Lund 2, Ray Tyldesley

1989 - 11 Meetings - Peter Falding 4, John Lund 4, John Toulson, David Toulson, Len Wolfenden

=== BriSCA F1 European Championship Final at Aycliffe ===
1987 - Ian Smith (367) 1st,

=== BriSCA F1 Grand National Championship Final at Aycliffe ===
1986 - John Lund (racing driver) (53) 1st,

1989 - John Lund (racing driver) (53) 1st,

=== BriSCA F1 World Championship Semi Final Top 3 places at Aycliffe ===
1985 - Stuart Smith 1st, Harry Smith 2nd, Dave Berresford 3rd

1989 - Nigel Whorton 1st, Des Chandler 2nd, Les Mitchell 3rd

=== BriSCA F2 British Championship Final at Aycliffe ===
1989 - Rob Speak (218) 1st,

=== BriSCA F2 Grand National Championship Final at Aycliffe ===
1986 - Malcolm Locke (698) 1st,

=== BriSCA F2 Benevolent Fund Trophy at Aycliffe ===
1987 - Bill Trout (501) 1st,

== Greyhound racing ==
Independent (unaffiliated to a governing body) greyhound racing took place at the Aycliffe Stadium. After the war a syndicate of local businessmen constructed the stadium. The racing finished in 1960.

== Speedway ==
In 1948 a speedway track was constructed using ash from Darlington Power Station. This track was used for speedway training and practice sessions during 1948 and 1952.
