= Barry Goldin =

- Nationality: (United Kingdom) British
- Born: 24 July 1978 (age 48) Bolton, Greater Manchester

BriSCA Formula 2 Stock Cars career
- Debut season: 1995
- Car number: 401

Previous series
- 1991–1994: Ministox

Barry Goldin (born 24 July 1978) is a BriSCA Formula 2 Stock Cars racing driver from Bolton, Greater Manchester who races under number 401. Goldin is one of a select group of drivers who has won the National Points Championship on three occasions. In 2012, Barry married fellow racer and BTCC Grid Girl Jo Polley, although the pair announced their separation in September 2014.

== Racing career ==
Goldin began his racing career in Ministox at the age of 12 in 1991. He won numerous regional championships in 1993 and 1994 and the National Points Championship in 1993.

In 1995, Goldin began racing Formula 2 stock cars. He earned his first championship success in 1999, taking the English Championship. However, it wasn't until Rob Speak retired from Formula 2 that Goldin could step up to become the sport's number one driver. With Speak gone, Goldin won the first of three consecutive National Points Championships in 2000. The second and third Points Championships saw Goldin overcome his closest rival, Gordon Moodie.

Goldin switched his emphasis to winning the World Championship in 2003 and was successful straight away, winning the title at Taunton.

After that Goldin hit something of a slump in form, although he retained the red roof of a star or superstar driver. He found form again in 2011, winning the British Championship for a third time and the European Championship for the first time. In 2013, Goldin became the ninth confirmed Formula 2 stock car driver to win 100 meeting finals over the course of his career, followed by a second European title. In 2014 he won the UK Championship at Skegness in July and a month later he added the World of Shale title to his tally at Coventry. In September he looked like he was heading to his second World title, when he was comfortably leading the World Championship at Cowdenbeath. However disaster struck when a back-marking car he was following blew its engine and Barry crashed heavily on the resultant oil slick. He was concussed in the crash.

== Honours ==
- World Champion: 2003
- National Points Champion: 2000, 2001, 2002
- British Champion: 2001, 2004, 2011
- European Champion: 2011, 2013
- English Champion: 1999, 2002, 2008
- UK Champion 2014
- World of Shale Champion 2014
