= BriSCA Formula 2 Stock Cars World Championship =

The World Championship is an annual competition and the premier championship for BriSCA Formula 2 Stock Cars. The winner is granted the honour of racing with a gold roof and wing until the next World Final.

== Qualification ==
The World Final is usually held in September. The host tracks, all of which are based in Britain, are chosen by the designated promoter.

The grid for the World Final is composed of drivers from Britain who are chosen through a series of qualifying rounds and two World Championship Semi-Finals. Drivers who fail to progress from the World Semi-Finals may race again in a Consolation Semi-Final to choose two more entrants, and the reigning World Champion is entitled to start at the rear of the grid if they have not already qualified. The British drivers are joined by stock car drivers from the Netherlands, Northern Ireland and the Isle of Man.

The most successful driver in World Final races is Rob Speak, who has won eight. Other notable multiple winners include Bill Batten (four), Dave Brown (three) and Gordon Moodie (three).

== List of winners ==
All drivers are British, except where marked.

Year	Winner	Second	Third	Venue
1963	Roy Goodman	Chick Woodroffe	Fred Funnell	Swindon
1964	Roy Gaskin	Johnny Sparks	Don Evans	Swindon
1965	Johnny Marquand	Andy Webb	Steve Bateman	Swindon
1966	Steve Bateman	Johnny Marquand	Eddie Aisling	Northampton
1967	Andy Webb	Eddie Aisling	Ian Durham	Swindon
1968	Tom Pitcher	Ian Durham	Johnny Marquand	Rayleigh
1969	Ron Innocent	Tom Pitcher	Roy Goodman	Northampton
1970	Dave Chisholm	John Holley	Tom Pitcher	Harringay
1971	Dave Brown	Maurice Stirling	Colin Higman	Northampton
1972	Jim Murray	John Holley	Colin Higman	St Austell
1973	Tom Pitcher	Colin Higman	Fleming Bell	Bristol
1974	Dave Brown	Alistair Jackson	Tom Pitcher	Wembley
1975	Colin Higman	Roy Goodman	Ivor Greenwood	Bristol
1976	Colin Higman	John Maggafin	Mike Williams	St Austell
1977	Bill Batten	Kevin Stack	Mike Nancekivell	Taunton
1978	Jeremy Deeble	John White	Neil Johnson	Bristol
1979	Dave Brown	Phil Hayhurst	Bill Batten	Newton Abbot
1980	Dave Bunt	Steve Horton	Jim Cunliffe	Hartlepool
1981	Bill Batten	Gary Hooper	Kevin Stack	Northampton
1982	Bill Batten	Ian King	Dave Bunt	Taunton
1983	Dave Bunt	Kevin Stack	Malcolm Locke	Newton Abbot
1984	Malcolm Locke	Kevin Stack	Nick Lawrence	Newtongrange
1985	Malcolm Locke	Jimmy Moodie	Gary Sansome	Bristol
1986	Gary Hooper	Jimmy Moodie	George Beckham	Hartlepool
1987	Dave Luscombe	George Feagan	George Beckham	Skegness
1988	Jimmy Wallace	Alistair Hunter	Graham Bunter	Taunton
1989	Jimmy Wallace	Malcolm Locke	Paul Shepherd	Newton Abbot
1990	Alistair King	Jimmy Moodie	Steve Green	Cowdenbeath
1991	Rob Speak	Dave Luscombe	Bryn Thomas	Bristol
1992	Rob Speak	Les Clarke	Ian King	Skegness
1993	Ian King	John Mickel	Mark Taylor	Crewe
1994	Rob Speak	Bill Batten	Mick Sworder	Taunton
1995	Rob Speak	Bill Batten	(Netherlands) Toon Schut	Ringwood
1996	Rob Speak	Mike James	Daz McInstry	Northampton
1997	Rob Speak	Tim Farrell	Stephen Paterson	Cowdenbeath
1998	Rob Speak	Bert Finnikin	Mick Sworder	Swindon
1999	Rob Speak	Daz Kitson	Peter Gilbert	Buxton
2000	Daz Kitson	Bert Finnikin	Barry Goldin	King's Lynn
2001	Daz Kitson	Tim Farrell	Barry Goldin	Northampton
2002	Chris Burgoyne	Stu Gilchrist	Barry Goldin	Cowdenbeath
2003	Barry Goldin	Bill Batten	James Thackra	Taunton
2004	Bill Batten	Paul Broatch	Barry Goldin	Barford
2005	(Netherlands) Willie Peeters	Daz Kitson	Gordon Moodie	Northampton
2006	Gordon Moodie	Mark Simpson	Tim Farrell	Mildenhall
2007	Mick Sworder	James Thackra	Mark Simpson	Arena Essex
2008	Ian Thompson Junior	Dave Luscombe	Stuart Kelly	Bristol
2009	Micky Brennan	Robbie Dawson	Dave Polley	Buxton
2010	John Fortune	Chris Bradbury	Dave Polley	Skegness
2011	Mark Simpson	Rob Mitchell	Gordon Moodie	King's Lynn
2012	Micky Brennan	Chris Bradbury	Sam Wagner	Barford
2013	James Rygor	Chris Burgoyne	Neil Hooper	Taunton
2014	George MacMillan Junior	Gordon Moodie	Chris Bradbury	Cowdenbeath
2015	Kelvyn Marshall	Graham Fegan	George MacMillan Junior	Hednesford
2016	(Netherlands) Wim Peeters	Steve Wycherley	Dave Polley	Mildenhall
2017	(Netherlands) Wim Peeters	Gordon Moodie	Billy Webster	King's Lynn
2018	Gordon Moodie	Liam Rennie	Steven Gilbert	Bristol
2019	Gordon Moodie	(Netherlands) Wim Peeters	Kelvyn Marshall	Buxton
2020	Not held due to COVID-19 pandemic			
2021	Chris Burgoyne	(Netherlands) Wim Peeters	Luke Wrench	Skegness
2022	Dave polley	Micky Brennan	Charlie Guinchard	King's Lynn
