= Foxhall, Suffolk =

Civil parish in England

Coordinates: 52.034574°N 1.237974°E

Foxhall
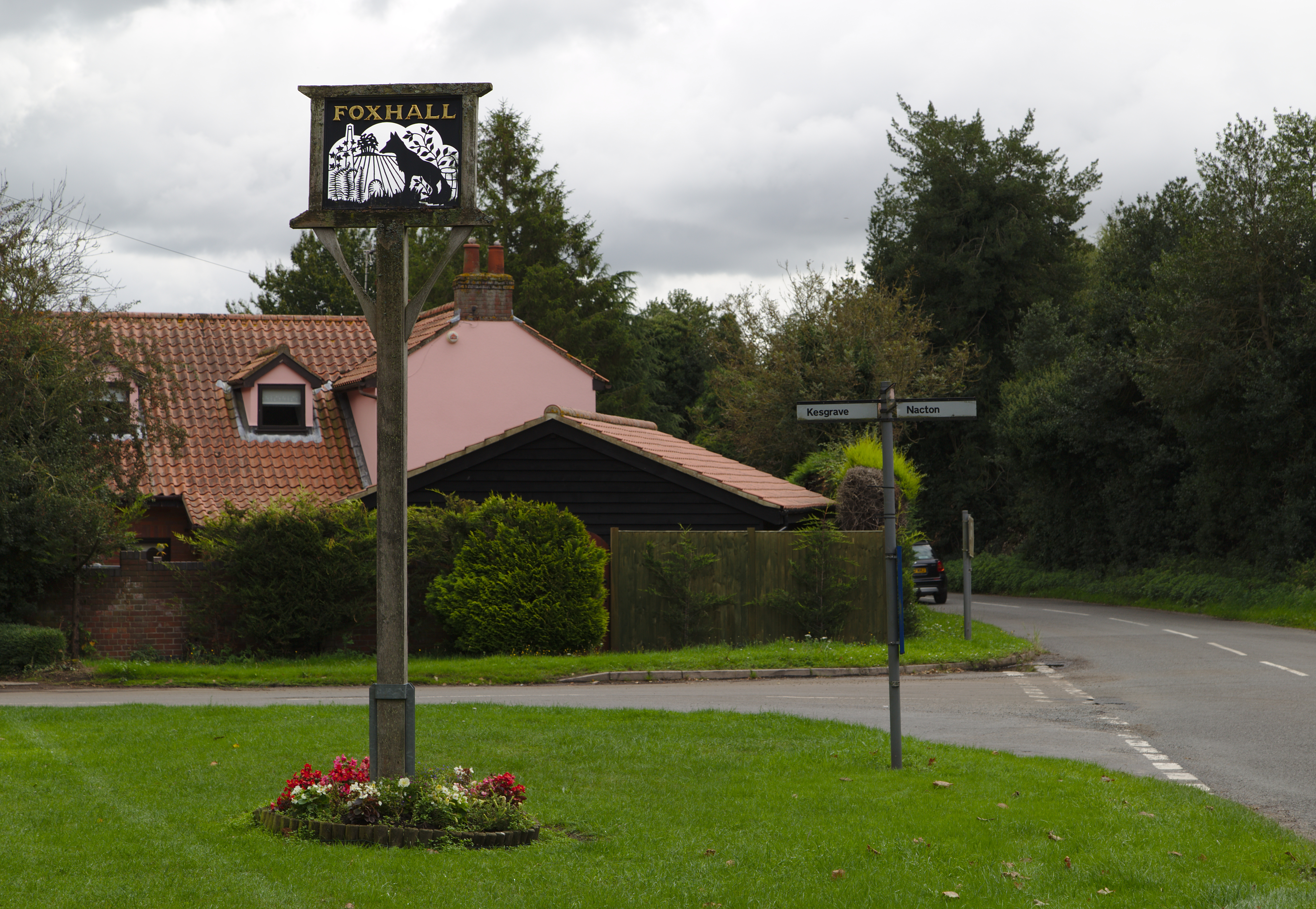
- Foxhall Village Sign

- Location within Suffolk
- Population: 200 (2011 census)
- Civil parish: Foxhall
- District: East Suffolk
- Shire county: Suffolk
- Region: East
- Country: England
- Sovereign state: United Kingdom
- Post town: Ipswich
- Postcode district: IP10
- Police: Suffolk
- Fire: Suffolk
- Ambulance: East of England
- UK Parliament: Suffolk Coastal
- Website: www.foxhall.suffolk.gov.uk

Foxhall is a civil parish in the East Suffolk district of Suffolk, England a few miles east of Ipswich. It is adjacent to the parishes of Kesgrave to the north, Martlesham to the northeast, Brightwell to the east, Purdis Farm to the south and the borough of Ipswich to the west. The three parishes of Brightwell, Foxhall and Purdis Farm have a common council. The 2001 population was 151 persons in 57 households according to the census, the population having increased at the 2011 Census to 200.

Foxhall was recorded in the Domesday Book of 1086 as "Foxehola". The history and meaning ('fox-hole') of the name Foxhall and many other place-names in the parish are studied in a paper by Keith Briggs. The survey mentions 1 holding under Foxhall: 15 acres valued at 2 shillings held by the Abbot of Ely. Under the heading of "Derneford", "which is no doubt Darnford in Foxhall, there was 80 acres and 2 acres of meadow, 3 bordars in Saxon times having 4 plough-teams when it was valued at 40 shillings, but at the time of the survey 3 plough-teams only, when it was valued at 15 shillings."

On the heath are several springs which flow into the Bucklesham Mill River, a tributary of the River Deben. All Saints’ Church stood north of this river; it was in ruins by the mid-16th century. Much of this church building survives; the north wall is mainly intact and can still be seen put to a new use as part of the barn of Foxhall Farm. It stands at the top of a slope overlooking one of the backroads that link Foxhall Road with Bucklesham Road. Two enormous buttresses give the game away, as well as an expanse of flint amongst the red-brick. In 1530, Foxhall became an ecclesiastical hamlet to Brightwell.

Despite its name the Foxhall Stadium, the home stadium of the Ipswich Witches speedway team is actually just across the parish boundary in Kesgrave. The stadium is run by Spedeworth UK Ltd, stock car promoters.

More recently the banger racing Unlimited World Final has been staged here since its move from the Plough Lane venue in London. The World Final was first held at Foxhall in 2008 and proved to be a successful event. The World Final is predicted to stay at Foxhall due to the LEZ emission laws enforced in and around London, making it difficult for many racers to transport their cars to the track.

The stadium opened in the mid-1950s and has been in continuous operation since.

Within the parish is the Nuffield Ipswich Hospital, a modern purpose-built hospital set in twenty acres of woodland.

The village once had its own beer house (brewery with pub attached) called the Waddling Duck, long since demolished.

There is a caravan site at Hollies Farm.

Foxhall is commonly thought of as a village because of its history and because many relatively modern houses have been built along the part of Bucklesham Road that lies in the parish. However, it is just an area with a few houses bearing the name 'Foxhall'.
