= Roy Goodman (racing driver) =

British racing driver (born 1929)

- Nationality: (United Kingdom) British
- Born: 11 December 1929 (age 96)
- Retired: 2004

BriSCA Formula 2 Stock Cars
- Years active: 1963-2004

Previous series
- 1954-1974: BriSCA Formula 1 Stock Cars

Roy Goodman (born 11 December 1929) is a former BriSCA Formula 2 Stock Cars racing driver. Goodman is one of the most successful drivers ever in the formula, having won the first ever World Championship in 1963 and National Points Championship on nine occasions. He also competed in BriSCA Formula 1 Stock Cars for two decades.

== Racing career ==
Goodman began racing BriSCA Formula 1 Stock Cars in 1954, the first season that the sport existed. Goodman did not reach the same heights of success that he would later achieve in Formula 2.

Goodman first began racing BriSCA Formula 2 Stock Cars in 1963, three years after the formula was introduced. He first raced while still a regular Formula 1 driver as a favour another driver, Ted Elliott, who was struggling to set up his car correctly. Goodman raced both formulae until he retired from Formula 1 in 1974.

In 1963, the first ever Formula 2 World Championship was held in Swindon. Goodman had won both semi-finals and started from pole position in his Ford Popular. He won the race with Chick Woodroffe and Fred Funnell in second and third.

Goodman continued to be successful after his World Final success. He won the National Points Championship in 1964 and 1966, then on six consecutive occasions between 1968 and 1973, and again in 1975. He continued racing Formula 2 until his retirement in 2004.

== Racing administration and post-retirement ==
Goodman built the stock car racing stadium at Taunton and operating as promoter between 1974 and 1994. He also acted as the Licensing Officer for BriSCA F2. In 2012, Goodman was invited to start the 2012 World Final from the back of the grid to mark the fiftieth running of the race.

== Honours ==
- World Champion: 1963
- National Points Champion: 1964, 1966, 1968, 1969, 1970, 1971, 1972, 1973, 1975
