= Mendips Raceway =

Motorsport venue in Somerset, England

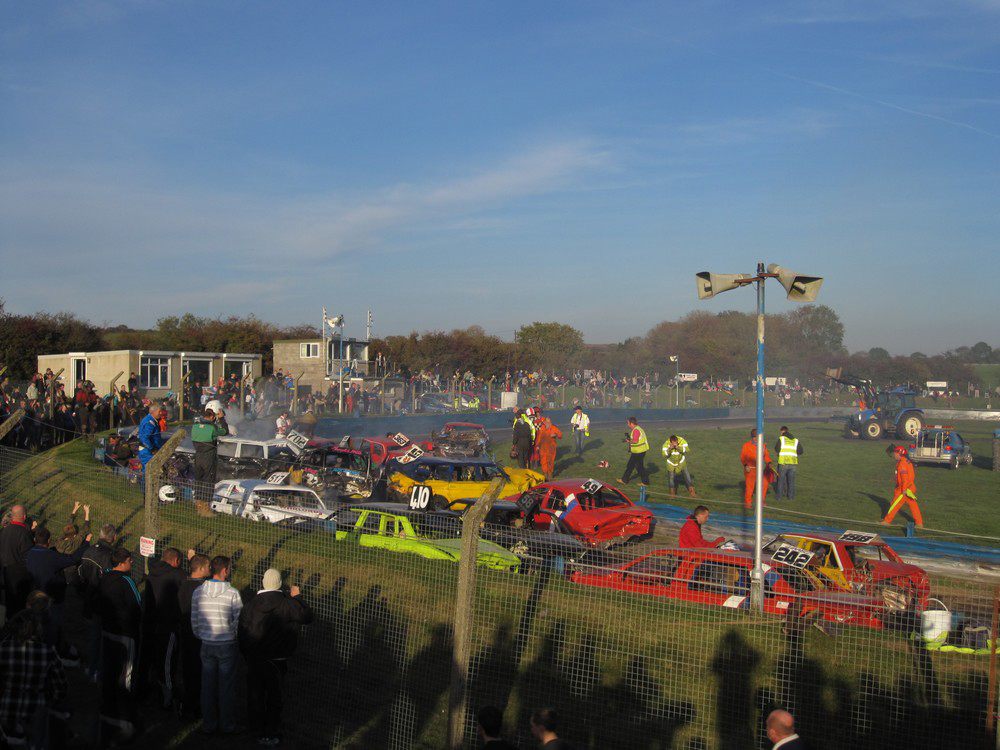
- Location: Mendip Hills, Somerset, England
- Coordinates: 51°17′51″N 2°46′14″W
- Owner: Graham, Pat & Jack Bunter
- Operator: Mendips Raceway Limited
- Opened: 1969
- Major events: Rods, Stock cars, Bangers, Demolition

Oval

Mendips Raceway is a motorsport venue in the Mendip Hills in Somerset, England. It is located on the rim of Batts Combe quarry between Shipham and Charterhouse. The oval shaped circuit is used for racing hot rods, stock cars, Hotstox, bangers and demolition events. The circuit, which was opened in 1969, features an oval and a figure of eight layout. The latter is used for different classes of banger racing which sometimes involve towing caravans, or feature specialist vehicles such as hearses or Reliant Robins.

Until 2018, it hosted the West of England Championship for Rods every August. It has also hosted the BriSCA F2 World Championship Final several times
