= Crimond Raceway =

Race track in Aberdeenshire, Scotland

Coordinates: 57.608268°N 1.896172°W

Crimond Raceway is the most northerly stock car track in the United Kingdom. It is located about a mile from the village of Crimond in Aberdeenshire, Scotland. The airfield nearby is where former Formula One world champion driver Jim Clark began his career.

The stock cars began in the 1950s with the original tracks on the runways on the nearby Crimond Aerodrome. However the Ministry of Defence reclaimed the land to build radio masts and so the track was moved three times before settling for its current situation in 1973/1974.

The track is an oval with two stands and a large tire wall around the outside to protect the spectators.

Today the track hosts National Hot Rod, Saloonstox, BriSCA Formula Two and other local formula championships under the auspices of the ORCi (Oval Racing Council International)
