= Barry Lee =

British racing driver (born 1944)

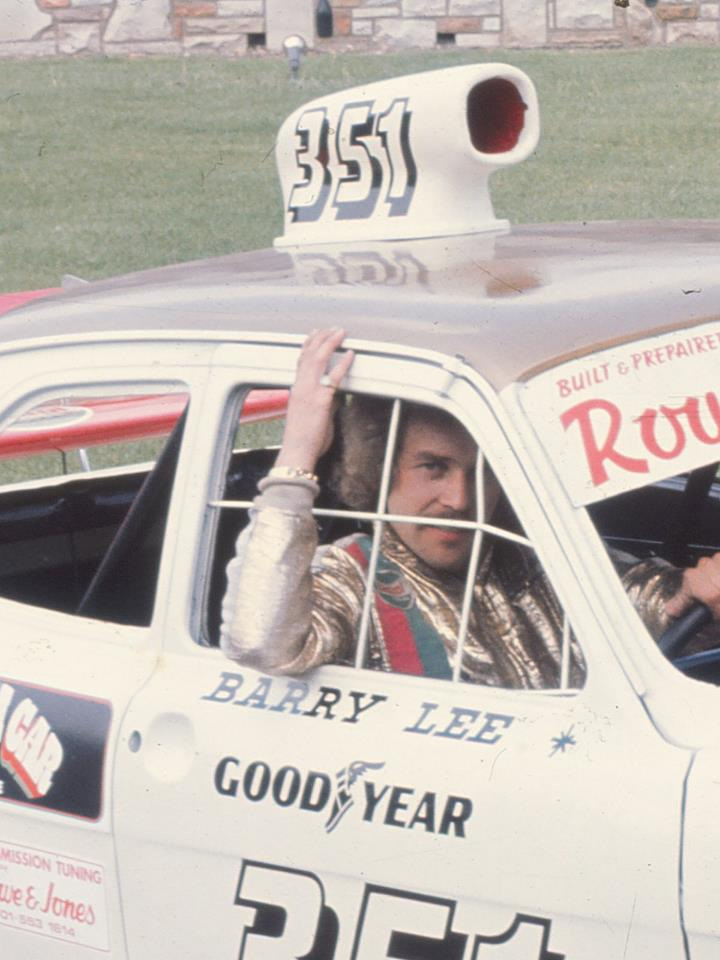
Walthamstow, 1974

Barry John Lee (born 17 August 1944 in Wisbech), nicknamed "Leapy" or "No 351", is a British racing driver who has been successful in many areas of motor sport. He started as a jockey, and then a speedway rider for Hackney and then moved into autocross, rallying and rallycross. His greatest successes were in short oval hot rod racing where he won four world titles. After retiring from short oval racing, Lee moved into raid rallying, making three attempts (1987–1989) at the Paris-Dakar Rally with Ted Toleman. In 1994, he won the inaugural Eurocar V6 Saloon Car Championship. He successfully defended the title in 1995 before moving into the new V8 Championship in 1996. Lee has also competed in the British Saloon Car Championship and the British Truck Racing Championship.

In short oval racing, Lee notched up over 1400 wins, a number that Motorsport magazine described as "never likely to be bettered".

== Major Titles Won ==
=== Autocross ===
1966 Players Autocross Champion

=== Rallycross ===
1978 BTRDA Rallycross Champion

=== Hot Rod Racing ===
World Champion 1973, 1974, 1977, 1978
European Champion 1974, 1975
National Champion 1972, 1975
Grand Prix / NHRPA Series Winner 1978, 1980
Spedeworth National Points Champion 1972, 1973, 1974, 1975, 1978, 1983
British Champion 1971, 1972, 1977, 1981
English Champion 1974, 1975, 1976, 1979, 1980

=== Eurocar V6 Saloon Championship ===
1994 Champion
1995 Champion

== Author ==
Lee has written two books on hot rod racing (see below) and was also a columnist for various motor racing magazines over the years, including Oval News, Auto Enthusiast and Rods & Stocks International. He has also commentated on hot rod racing for Sky Sports.

The Barry Lee Book of Hot Rod Racing (1972)
The Barry Lee Guide to Hot Rod Racing (1979)

In 2013, Lee released his autobiography, The Other Side of Winning.

== Racing record ==
=== Complete British Saloon Car Championship results ===
(key) (Races in bold indicate pole position; races in italics indicate fastest lap.)

Year	Team	Car	Class	1	2	3	4	5	6	7	8	9	10	11	12	DC	Pts	Class
1984	Barry Lee Racing	Ford Escort RS1600i	C	DON; Ret	SIL; Ret	OUL; Ret	THR; DNS	THR ovr:18 cls:5	SIL; DNS	SNE	BRH ovr:16 cls:6	BRH	DON	SIL		26th	3	7th
1985	Barry Lee	Ford Escort RS1600i	C	SIL	OUL	THR	DON	THR	SIL	DON	SIL ovr:19 cls:5	SNE; Ret	BRH	BRH	SIL	30th	2	11th
