= Rob Speak =

British racing driver

- Nationality: (United Kingdom) British
- Born: 14 March 1972 (age 54) Tyldesley, Greater Manchester
- Retired: 2016

BriSCA Formula 1 Stock Cars
- Years active: 1999-2002, 2012-2016

Previous series
- 1988-2016 1985-1987 2001-2004: BriSCA Formula 2 Stock Cars; Ministox; Ascar

Rob Speak (born 14 March 1972) is a racing driver from Tyldesley, Greater Manchester, he’s one of the most successful drivers in BriSCA Formula 2 Stock Cars history. He has won the National Points Championship eleven times in succession and the World Championship eight times (six in a row). In addition, he has won the BriSCA Formula 1 Stock Cars World Championship, National Points Championship plus the European Championship twice each. In September 2016 he became the new owner and promoter of the Skegness Stadium in Lincolnshire.

== Stock Car career ==
Speak began his racing career in a Ministox costing £50 at Long Eaton. In his three seasons in Ministox, he went on to win every major title, concluding his Minstox racing as National, National Points and British Champion in 1987.

In 1988, at the age of 16, Speed moved up to BriSCA Formula 2 Stock Cars. He went on to become the number one driver in the sport with records that may never be beaten. He won 147 races during his best season. At Cowdenbeath, he became the first driver in Scotland to win all his heats, final and Grand National races. In his first full BriSCA F2 season in 1989, he became the youngest National Points Champion at the age of just 17. He then went on to defend his title ten times. During this time he also won eight World Championship titles in the sport.

In 1999, while becoming disillusioned with BriSCA Formula 2 Stock Cars, Speak started to pursue a career in BriSCA Formula 1 Stock Cars. With just eleven appearances out of 47 race meetings, he finished the National Points Championship in 24th place with 247 points. The following year, Speak retired from BriSCA F2 and raced full-time in BriSCA F1. The highlight of the season was winning the European Championship at Northampton using a new Frankie Wainman Junior-built tarmac car for the first time. The 2001 season started badly at Coventry when the engine was damaged. After seven second places and four third places, it was not until 12 August at Skegness Stadium that he won his first meeting final. Nevertheless, consistent results kept him in the top three of the National Points. He also successfully defended the European Championship in July, and won the World Championship in September. 2002 saw Speak debut a new space-frame tarmac car. He won the meeting final first time out at Barford, but it was to be the only time that the car won a meeting final. By June, Speak had reverted to his previous car. 2002 was to be the first year he didn't win a major BriSCA F1 title, although he did come close with second place in both the British Championship and World Championship. He also suffered a puncture while in the lead in the European Championship. Rob took the decision to leave BriSCA F1 at the end of the season after disagreements with another driver.

In January 2000, Speak was voted 47th in a Motoring News poll to find the world's top 100 racing drivers. He beat names such as Nelson Piquet, Jacques Villeneuve, David Coulthard and Mika Häkkinen. Coverage of the results were included in The Sun newspaper.

2009 saw a much-anticipated return to BriSCA F2 Stock Cars. Speak was asked by Terry George to race a new Elite model stock car as a test bed for future cars. He raced in seven meetings, including a meeting final win at Buxton. This got him into the World Championship Semi-Final, in which he finished second behind Gordon Moodie. He was disqualified from the World Final for using outside assistance in the form of another car on the centre green to straighten a bent nerf rail. Speak qualified on the front row for the 2011 World Final at King's Lynn, but failed to complete the first lap after being shoved into the fence on the first corner after a heavy rain shower on the parade lap had turned the shale track very slick. He also competed in the World Finals in 2012 at Barford, 2013 at Taunton (where he started from pole position) and 2014 at Cowdenbeath, all of which he failed to finish and were dominated by his battles with Moodie, particularly 2013 which saw the pair clash spectacularly in a battle for the lead and resulted in Speak's tarmac chassis being written off in the crash. Then a year later, the duo had a run-in again, where Speak appeared to "brake test" Moodie on starting the second lap as he came to pass him, and this held both up. The pair did not meet on track until 11 months later when they both qualified in the same World Championship Semi Final at Skegness. They clashed again, and Speak took himself out of the race, and the 2015 World Championship in his efforts to stop Moodie. Speak won the 2013 British Championship at King's Lynn, after qualifying on the fifth row.

2012 saw a second return to competition, this time to BriSCA F1 Stock Cars. Initially a one-off to race for charity, Speak did enough to qualify for that year's World Championship. The following year saw him primarily a single-surface competitor on tarmac, in 2014, Speak raced both surfaces and won the National Points Championship. In 2015, he won the World Championship a second time, becoming the driver with the longest gap between World Final wins.

== ASCAR career ==
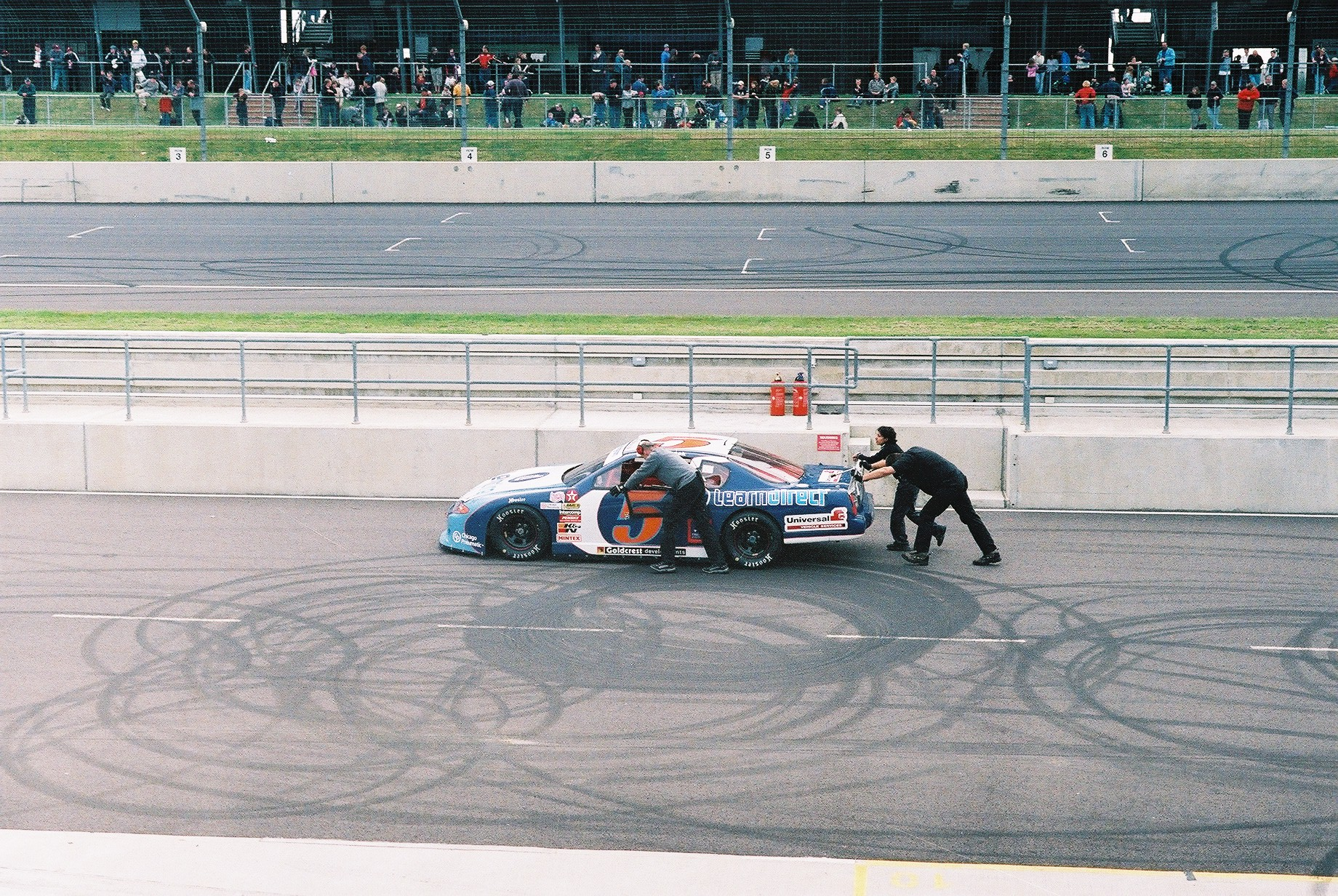
Rob Speak's car in the pits at Rockingham in 2003.

During the 2001 season, Speak debuted in the new ASCAR series racing at Rockingham Motor Speedway with two races for the Colin Blower team, in the second race he finished in fourth place, a season's best result for the team.

At the beginning of the 2002 season, Speak was given a full-time drive with the Colin Blower ASCAR team, it turned out to be a frustrating year with no podiums. A fifth place in Round 2 was to be his highest finish. He finished the season in ninth place.

In 2003, Speak decided to leave the world of F1 Stockcars and fully concentrated on his ASCAR racing. It was to be a frustrating year with many races being dogged with car trouble. But in a rain shortened 40 lap third round of the Championship, Speak produced his best race result, winning his first race. It showed what could be done when the car was right. Starting on the third row he took the lead on lap 16 to the flag. Results: RD 1 8th - RD 2 8th - RD 3 1st - RD 4 4th -RD 5 14th - RD 6 DNF - RD 7 18th - RD 8 DNF - RD 9 11th - RD 10 DNF - RD 11 DNA - RD 12 6th - RD 13 3rd.

The 2004 Days of Thunder Season was to be the final season he took part in the ASCAR racing with team mate Ben Collins.

== Other racing ==
In 2002, Speak raced in a National Hot Rod, driving Dick Hillard's spare Peugeot 205, finishing tenth and eleventh in heats but not completing the final due to a 15-car pile up.

Speak continues to occasionally race bangers. One of his typical best nights was the Belle Vue Charity Banger meeting. Speak went to enjoy himself and did just that winning the charity final and the Demolition Derby. This led to a drive in the Banger World Final at Wimbledon.

Speak started well from his 16th position on the 40 car grid. Driving a Granada under the GMP banner and was soon up into the top half dozen but progress was stopped when the engine packed up and that was the end of his night. Next stop Ipswich where he won a heat & started from the back of a 70 car final, he led with a quarter of a lap to go when he was T-boned by a rival from the centre green. He still managed to finish second. Then to Birmingham on cold wet night he came third in the final.

Speak is not to be confused with the driver of the same name who competed in a couple of British Touring Car Championship endurance races in the late 1980s.

== Honours ==
BriSCA Formula 2 Stock Cars:

- World Champion: 1991, 1992, 1994, 1995, 1996, 1997, 1998, 1999
- National Points Champion: 1989, 1990, 1991, 1992, 1993, 1994, 1995, 1996, 1997, 1998, 1999
- British Champion: 1989, 1992, 1998, 1999, 2013
- European Champion: 1994, 1996
- English Champion: 1993, 1998
- Scottish Champion: 1995, 1997
- Irish Champion: 1992, 1994, 1996, 1997, 1998
- Grand National Champion: 1990, 1993, 1995, 1996, 1998
- Nationals Champion: 1996, 1998
- Benevolent Fund Champion: 1993, 1996

BriSCA Formula 1 Stock Cars:

- World Champion: 2001, 2015
- National Points Champion: 2014, 2016
- European Champion: 2000, 2001
