= Skegness Stadium =

Racing circuit in Lincolnshire, England

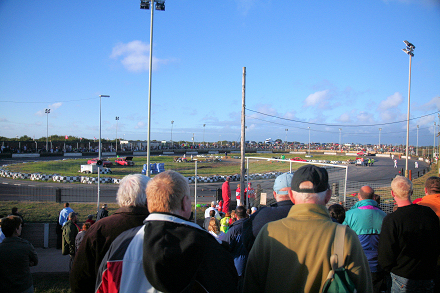
- Location: Marsh Lane, Orby, Skegness, Lincolnshire PE24 5JA
- Coordinates: 53°11′11″N 0°16′58″E
- Opened: 1977

Skegness Stadium is a short tarmac oval racing circuit used for stock car, banger racing and former greyhound racing and speedway stadium on Marsh Lane in Orby, Skegness, Lincolnshire. located just outside Skegness.

It hosts British stock car racing throughout the year, alongside special events such as truck racing, stunt shows, firework displays and caravan racing. Speedway racing was first staged at the stadium in 1997.

== Origins ==
The stadium was constructed in 1977 and is located in a rural setting north west of Skegness near Orby Marsh on the south side of Marsh Lane.

== Stock car and banger racing ==
Racing is usually held on weekends from March to November with some occasional mid-week meetings occurring over the summer months. The stadium hosts a variety of race formulas throughout the year with the BriSCA F1 Stock Car and banger team meetings attracting the biggest crowds. Some race meetings also having special events with stunt shows and demonstrations by Monster trucks used to attract a wider audience.

== Greyhound racing ==
Racing was sporadic after the opening night on 16 July 1981. The greyhound racing was independent (not affiliated to the sports governing body the National Greyhound Racing Club) and was known as a flapping track which was the nickname given to independent tracks.

The track had a 370 metres circumference and distances of 273, 460 and 640 metres. The principal race was the East Coast Derby and racing was held on Tuesday and Friday evenings with an additional race night on Saturdays during the summer months. The greyhounds operation closed and re-opened before finally closing for good on 16 February 1991.

== Speedway ==
The Skegness Braves speedway team rode at the stadium from 1997 to 1998.
