= Foxhall Stadium =

Stock car and speedway venue in Ipswich

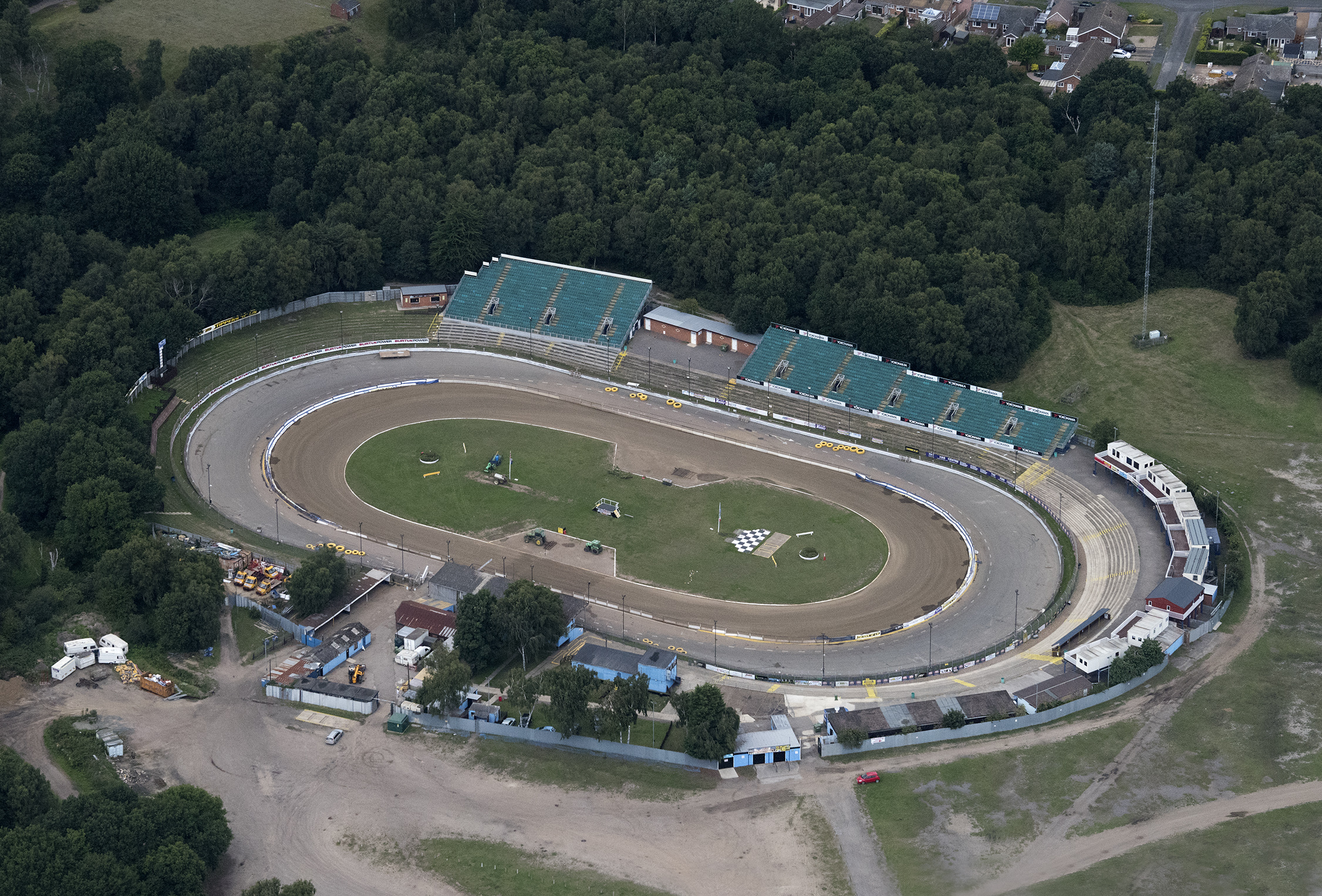
- Interactive map of Foxhall Stadium
- Coordinates: 52°3′16″N 1°13′30″E
- Owner: Spedeworth Motorsports
- Operator: Spedeworth Motorsports
- Surface: Stock cars (asphalt); Speedway (shale)

Construction
- Opened: 1951

Tenant
- Ipswich Witches (1951-)

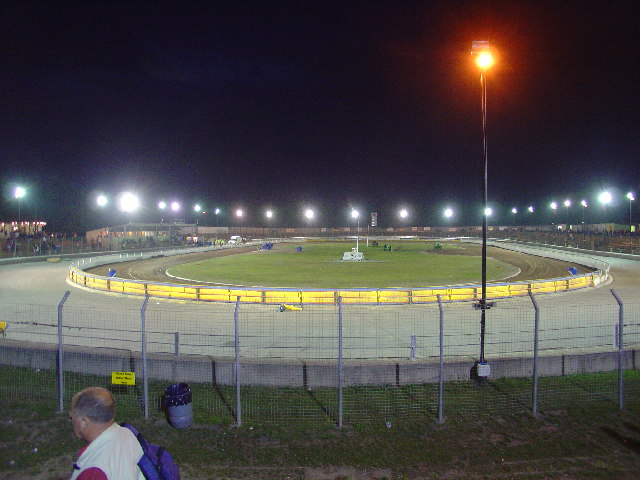
Foxhall Stadium

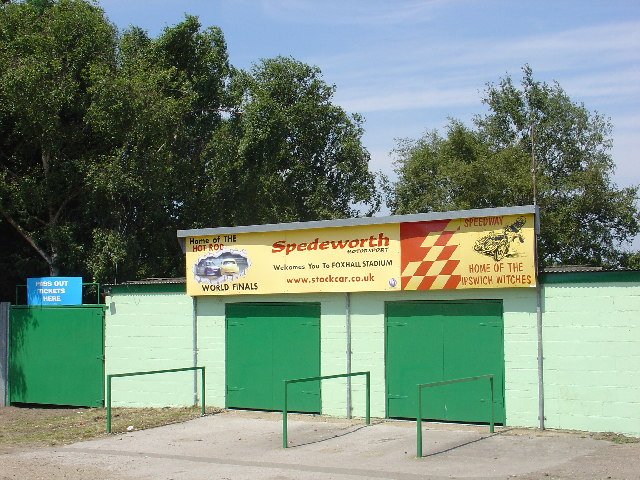

Foxhall Stadium is a Stock car and speedway stadium located in Foxhall near Ipswich. The stadium is run by Spedeworth Motorsports stock car promoters. The stadium opened in 1951 and has been in continuous operation since.

== Stock Car Racing ==
Known as the Foxhall International Raceway, the track is a 382-metre tarmac oval. The traditional main events at the Stadium include The National Hot Rod Championship of the World, held on the first weekend of July (as part of a two-day event labeled as 'Deaneweekend') and the Gala Night Held on the closest Saturday Night to Guy Fawkes Night. At both events a large entry of Stock Cars, Hot Rods and Banger Racers can be expected, as well as a capacity crowd of around 10,000.

More recently the Unlimited Banger World Final has been staged here since the event's move from the now demolished Plough Lane venue in London. The world final first ran at Foxhall in 2008 and proved to be a successful change. The world final is predicted to stay at Foxhall for the foreseeable future.

== Speedway ==
The Stadium is also used by the Ipswich Witches Speedway team, which race on most Thursday nights from March to October starting at 7.30pm. The venue first hosted speedway on 14 May 1951, when Ipswich competed against Yarmouth in a challenge match.

== Other uses ==
The stadium also hosts carboot sales on Sundays and Bank Holiday Mondays from March until the end of September opening at 6.00am and costing £9.00 to sell and 50p a person entry.

Another thing hosted at the stadium is Foxfest, a truck and car show, which takes place annually at the stadium during June. It is also seen as a fundraising event with aims to raise money for local charities.
