= Banger racing =

Type of motorsport

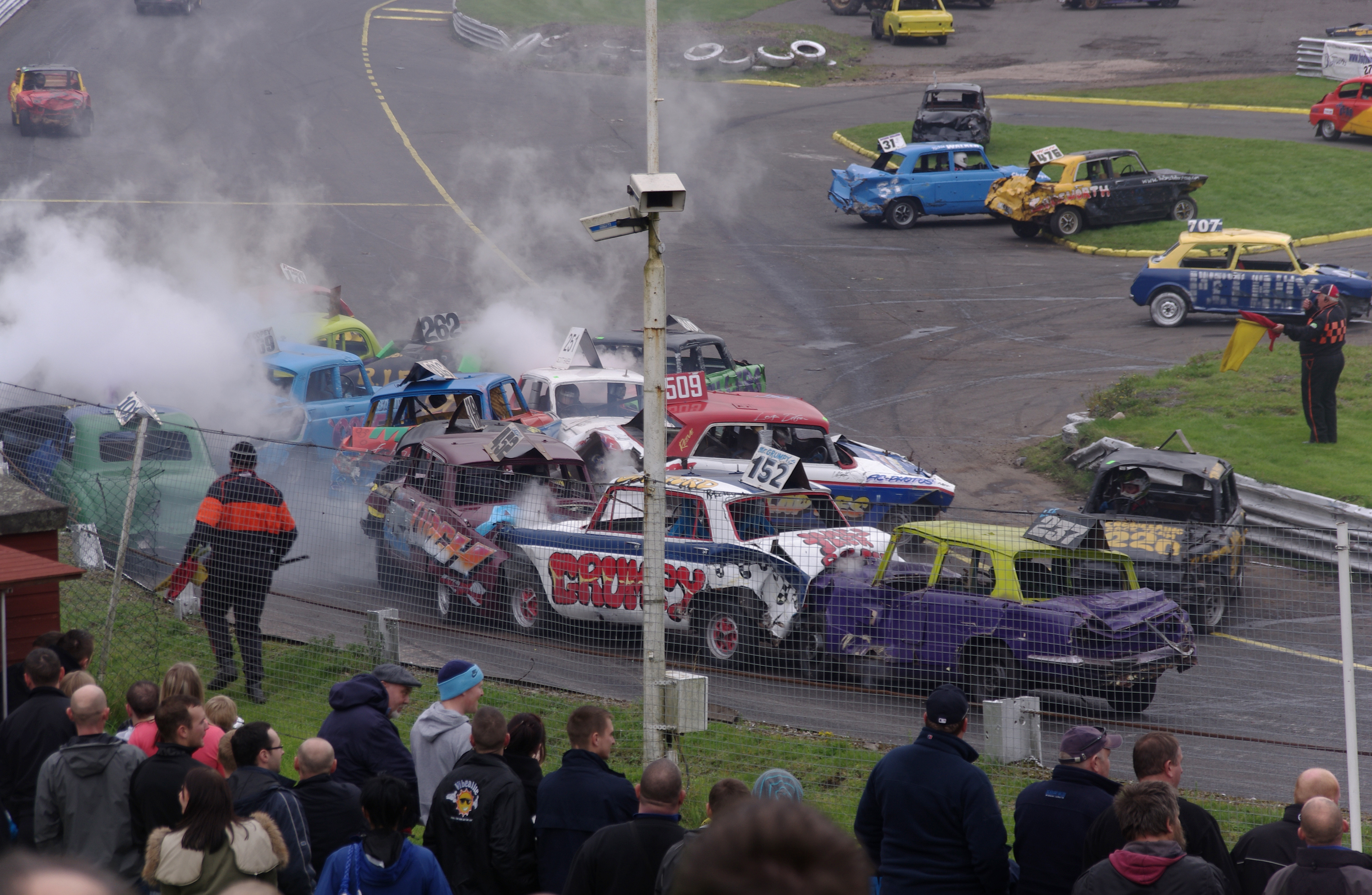
- Intentional crashing during a banger race at Hednesford Hills Raceway in Hednesford, Staffordshire, England in 2010
- First played: 1960s

Characteristics
- Contact: Yes
- Type: Outdoor
- Venue: Oval tracks and courses

Presence
- Country or region: United Kingdom, Ireland, Belgium, Netherlands

Banger racing is a type of motorsport event in which automobiles, traditionally derelict or totalled classic cars from scrapyards, are raced on oval, tri-oval, or figure-eight race tracks over several laps. The distinguishing feature of banger racing is that it permits and encourages contact between the participating vehicles, with the intent being to damage them over the course of the race.

Banger racing is similar to British stock car racing and demolition derbies, and is popular in the United Kingdom (where it originated in the 1960s), Ireland, Belgium, and the Netherlands. It is also known for being divisive among car enthusiasts regarding the motorsport's poor treatment of rare classic cars, the rare unchecked use of stolen vehicles at race events, and the dangers of crashing old cars with minimal safety features.

== Racing ==
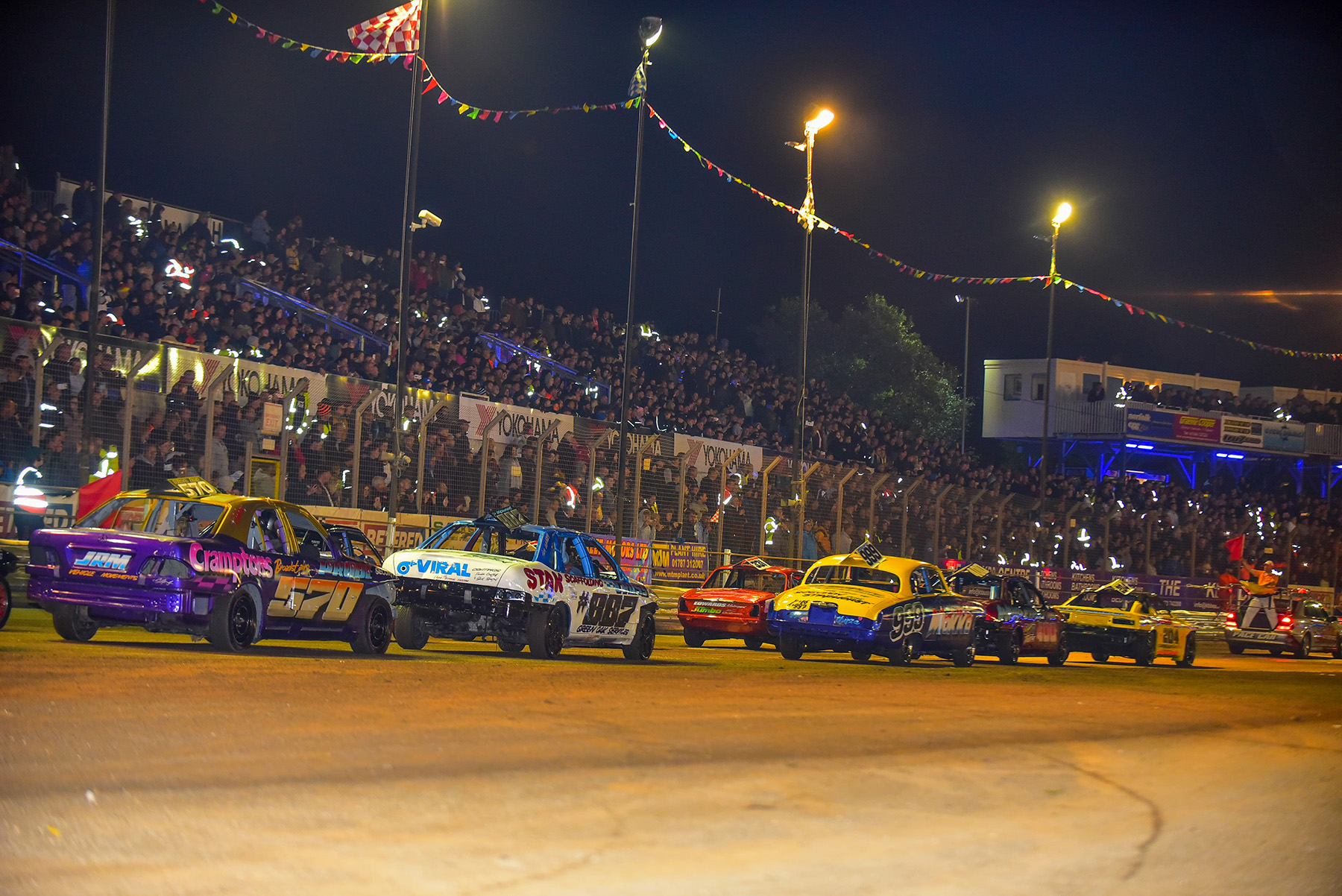
Racers being led by a safety car on World Final night at Foxhall Stadium in Ipswich, England

Banger racing within the UK is usually held to one of three rule presets that consist of varying degrees of contact during races. 'National' banger racing is the only one which is full-contact. Drivers are allowed to pull off aggressive hits like 't-bones', 'head-ons', 'follow-ins' and 'jack-ups' that are not allowed in other types of banger racing. Meetings held to National rulings are very popular and usually more destructive.

'Rookie' banger racing is a format designed to prolong the life of driver's cars with limited contact between drivers. The idea was brought about in the mid-1990s for those wishing to race bangers across the course of a season on a small budget. The reduced costs and crashes mean it is a safer and less aggressive environment for drivers, but not as popular with fans. The 'Rookie' banger format is commonly seen as a stepping stone for drivers who are looking to step up to the 'National' banger scene, with many drivers stepping up or partaking in both throughout their careers.

'Back to Basic' banger racing is an emerging part of the banger world, that is growing in success and popularity by acting as an entry-level way for fans to break into the sport. Racing is often held in the same style as the 'Rookie' banger division, but car preparation is scaled back, with drivers being able to leave in dashboards and on-key ignition, that would normally have to be removed. Drivers are also not allowed to protect their vehicles as much, with cars usually being stripped-down versions of how they appeared on the road. This is currently seen as the cheapest and easiest way to race bangers and harks back to the sport's roots of simple preparation and large grid sizes.

A banger race is distinct from a demolition derby, as the objective of the latter is not to turn laps, but to smash, destroy and ultimately immobilise all of the opposition, until only one vehicle is left. On occasions, though, the final event at a 'National' or 'Back to basic' Banger meeting may be a demolition derby where the cars that have raced compete to be the last one standing. At special events, caravans or small boats may be towed by racers during the demolition derby for added destruction during the event.

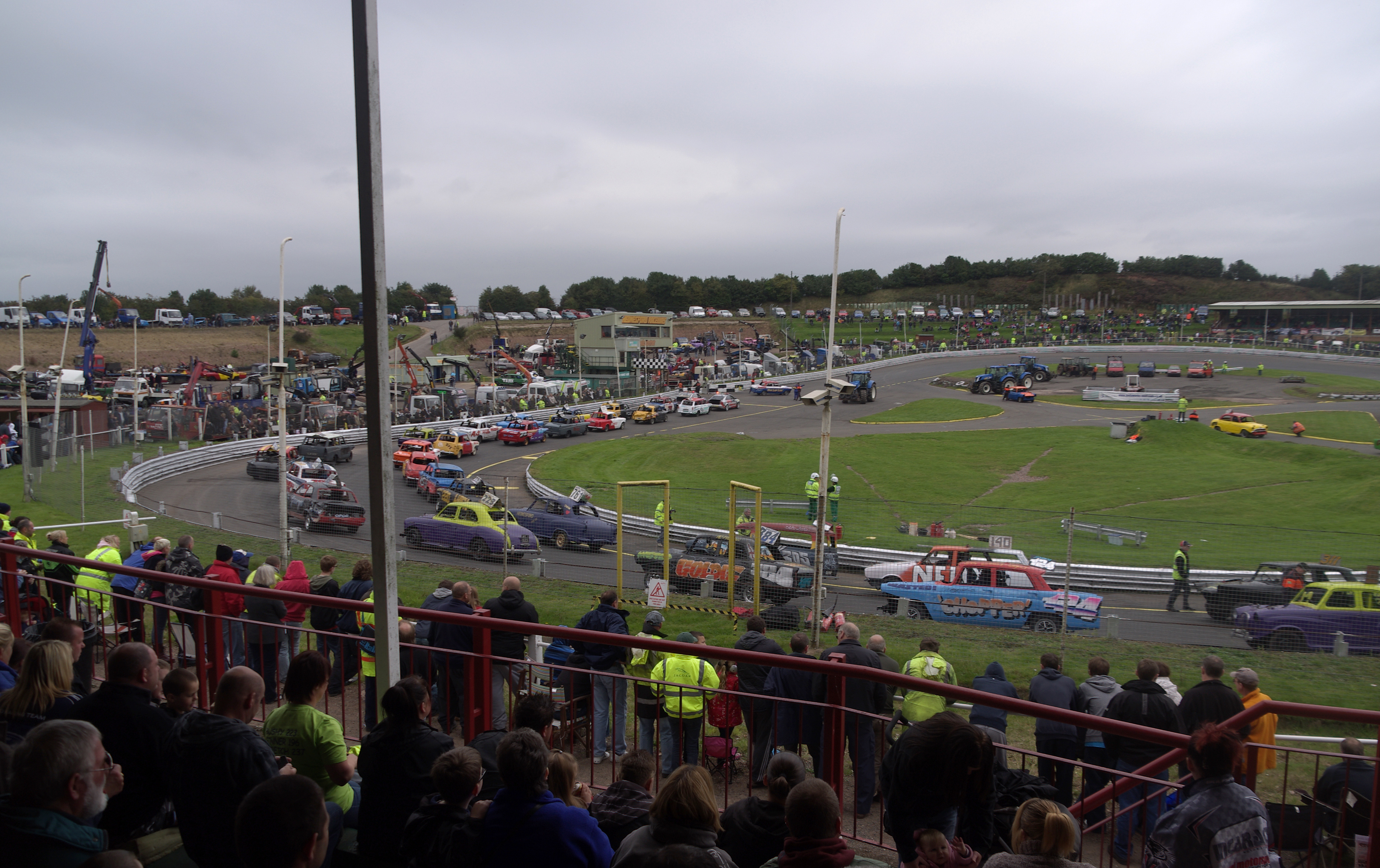
Bangers preparing to take part in a race at Hednesford Hills Raceway in 2010

At regular banger events, cars are gridded across the track, sometimes in a graded order of driver success, and then sent away to give a rolling start for the beginning of a race.

Despite the racing element of the sport, the community often categorise drivers into two different groups. There are those who are regarded as 'rodders', a term derived from the Hot Rod formulas that also commonly race on short ovals. These drivers aim to win races by any means possible. There are also those who are known as 'wreckers' and compete with the intention of destroying their own and other racer's cars. Wreckers are often more popular with the crowd, although drivers who win races and qualify for the world final are also respected.

Along with trophies for race winners and podium finishers, there are often trophies presented to the 'Best wrecker', 'Best entertainer' and 'Demolition derby winner', in order to attract drivers of both persuasions. Another trophy often given is a 'best car' award which is usually either given to the best-presented vehicle or the rarest car, with the latter being the subject of much controversy with classic car enthusiasts.

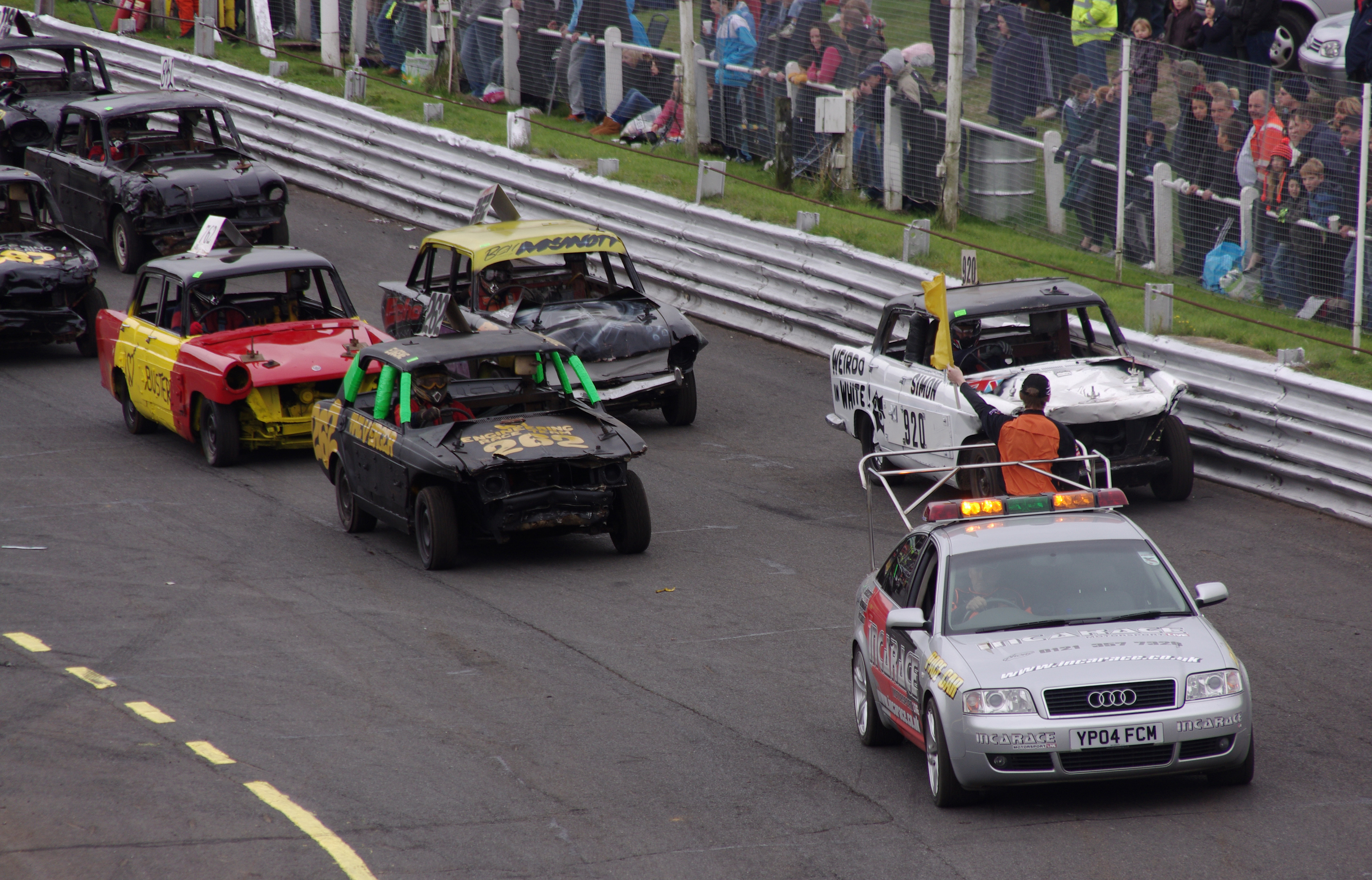
Banger racing cars behind the safety car at Hednesford Hills Raceway

In a banger race, yellow flags are used during the race to warn drivers that caution is required. Cars which stall or are stopped by opposing drivers are usually left on the course while the race continues. In recent times, drivers have been encouraged to remain inside a disabled car while the race continues, as this is adjudged to be the safest option. The largest association of European promoters has indeed mandated this, it is now a punishable offence to leave a car during 'green flags' unless deemed an emergency situation. If it is deemed necessary to move them or if a driver is in particular danger (including fire), a red flag may be used to stop the race. Races are then usually restarted when the situation has been cleared.

== Vehicles ==
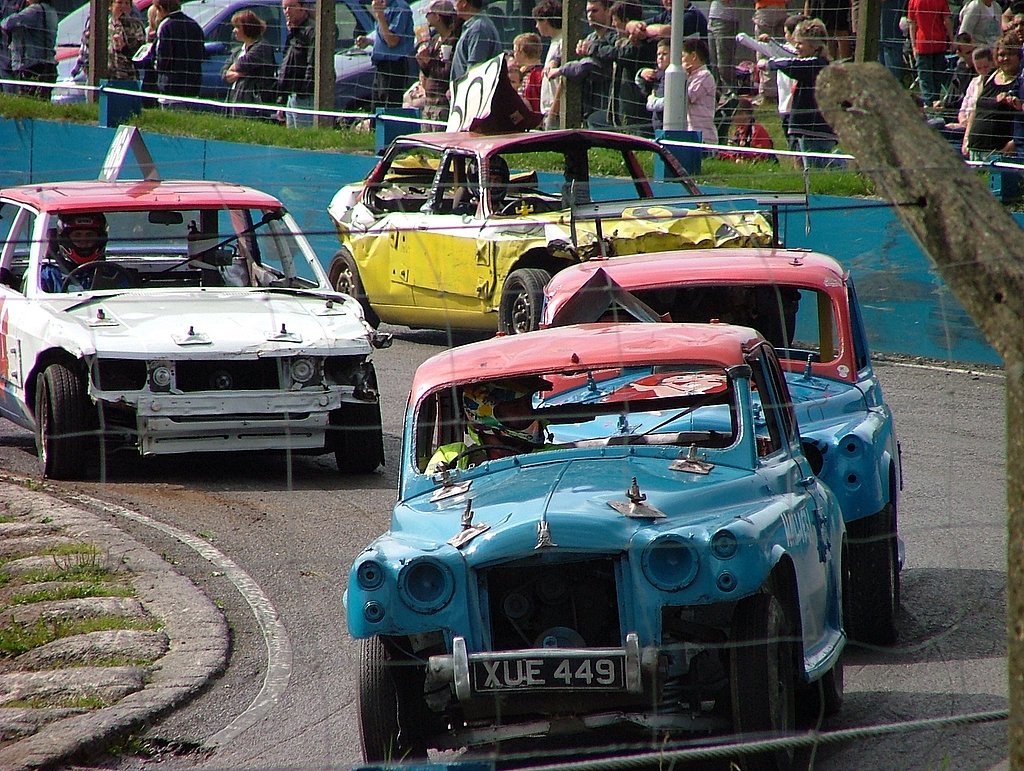
Several bangers racing at Mendips Raceway in Somerset, England

Vehicles used in banger racing, called "bangers", are typically scrapped or written-off cars in varying states of disrepair. They are most often from the 20th century, but in general are usually not newer than 10 to 20 years. In modern banger races, there are different events held for different vehicle classes.

The "Unlimited" class is the most common, where no limits are placed on engine displacement. Despite the high running costs, this is usually one of the most competitive classes and is favoured by most drivers because of the high speeds and car strengths. Its main stipulation is that the vehicle must be rear-wheel drive, unless it is from the American automotive market. This ruling makes car selections quite flexible for drivers, though certain models such as the SsangYong Rodius and Chrysler Imperial are prohibited due to their disproportionate strength compared to other vehicles in the same class.

The "Under 2000cc" class requires an engine displacement of under two litres. This class is particularly dominated by certain Ford models such as the Ford Mondeo and Ford Cougar, prompting some events to add additional constraints that force drivers to use different makes and models.

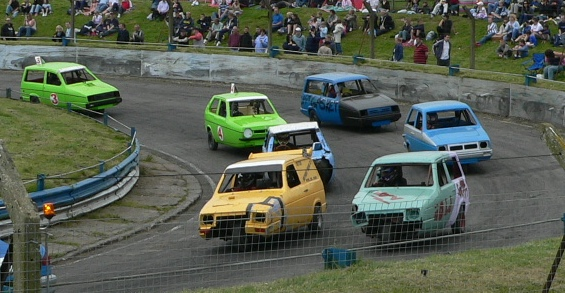
Reliant Robins racing at Mendips Raceway in 2005

The "Under 1300cc–1800cc" class, also known as "Domestic Bangers", has an engine displacement cap that varies based on the track or promotion that is holding the event. It is most common in the Rookie and Back to Basic formats.

The "Micro" class consists of A-segment and B-segment vehicles that are too small, underpowered, or uncompetitive to compete in the other classes. "Micros" have become increasingly popular due to the ubiquity of these types of cars in Europe and their cheap running and repair costs compared to the larger, older vehicles in other classes. Newer vehicles from the late 20th century and early 21st century, such as the Ford Ka, Ford Fiesta, and Nissan Micra, are more common in this class.

Other banger classes exist that are mostly only applied for special events, including those for SUVs, 4x4s, vans, lorries, large goods vehicles, buses, coaches, double-deckers, "Siamese" cars (two car bodies stacked on top of one another, with acceleration and braking controlled by the lower car and the steering controlled by the car on top), or "pre-" age-limited classic cars.

== History ==
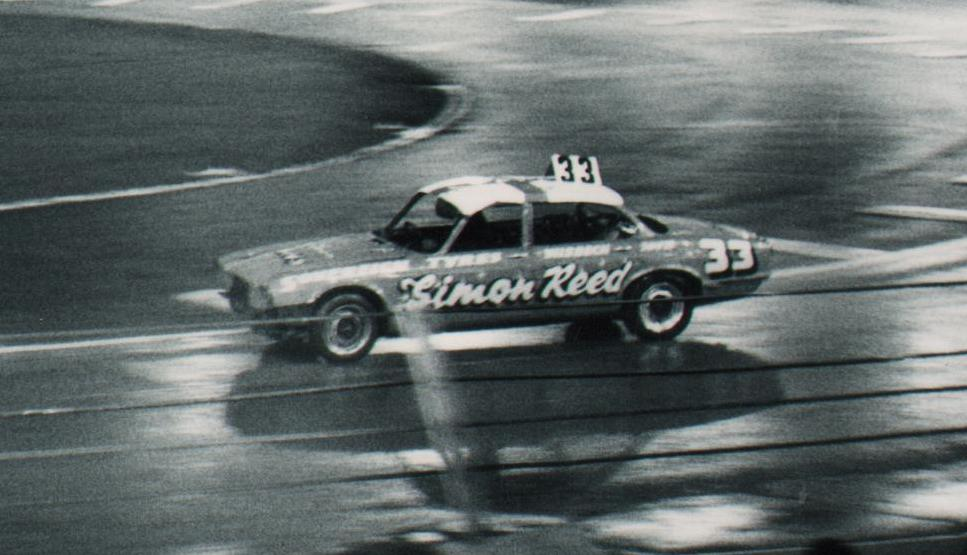
A Jaguar XJ6 in a banger race at Wimbledon Stadium in London, England

Banger racing is said to have started in the early 1960s in the United Kingdom, after a race promoter observed the most popular features of race meetings were the crashes. Drivers began using vehicles with very basic preparation, such as removed windows and headlights. Safety regulations improved in the 1980s with compulsory roll cages, driver's door plates, and interior-repositioned fuel tanks.

As the sport's popularity exploded during the 1970s and 1980s, many tracks in the UK and Ireland began to host banger events, building a strong driver and fan base in the process. These tracks and promotions began to host championship events, the first being PRI's Wimbledon World Finals in 1971 at Harringay Stadium in London. The Spedeworth Unlimited Banger World Final was another major championship event, first held in October 1974 at Wimbledon Stadium; since 2008, it has been held at Foxhall Stadium in Ipswich.

Around the late 1980s and early 1990s, promoters began hosting "open" meetings with few car limitations and large prize funds, the first being the British Open at Ringwood Raceway in Hampshire and the Firecracker 500 at Arena Essex Raceway in Essex. These meetings began to attract large turnouts and drivers from across the UK and Europe, with the annual Firecracker 500 becoming so popular that it became the venue's biggest meeting for fans and drivers alike until Arena Essex's closure in 2018.

Rookie banger racing was introduced in the mid-1990s as a way to reduce damage and preserve cars for new drivers. The new class initially mandated that the opening laps of each race remained 'non-contact', however this was later scrapped, as the large number participants on track meant it was very difficult for drivers to obey this rule.

=== Turnouts ===
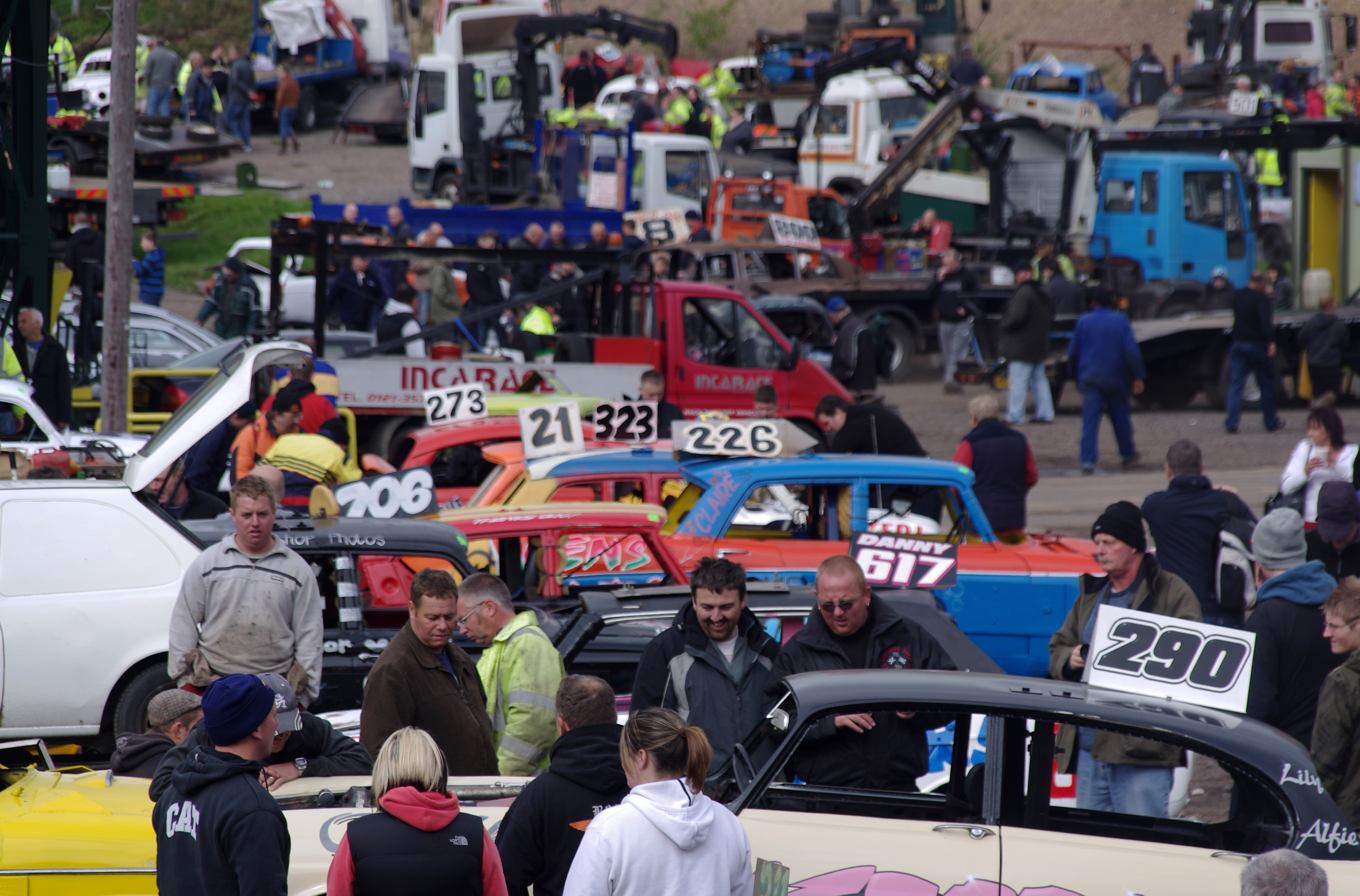
Drivers and fans examining banger race cars in the pit at Hednesford Hills Raceway

The peak number of cars to compete in one season was around 13,000 in 2003, of which around 9,500 were 'fresh' and had not been raced at any previous meetings. As for individual meetings, the largest turnouts vary depending on the banger class racing.

Meetings with 200+ bangers in attendance would be considered some of the biggest in the sport's history. The Unlimited "Icebreaker" meeting held at Swaffham Raceway on 8 February 1998 drew 209 cars, making it the first turnout with over 200 competitors. The largest accurate meeting turnout on record was the 2017 Spedeworth Unlimited National Banger World Final in which 269 cars were in attendance. The largest team meeting in the Netherlands was the Unlimited teams event held at Oval Emmem in 2016, which produced a turnout of 240 cars.

Turnout records have also been made within specific categories. The 2013 Olly Moran Memorial weekend held at Arena Essex Raceway in 2013 was the largest single-make turnout in the sport's history, with 232 drivers required to attend in a Mark I or Mark II Ford Granada. The 2018 Stan Woods Memorial meeting at Stoke had a similar requirement of only accepting cars produced before 1975, with 192 cars in attendance.

== Criticism ==
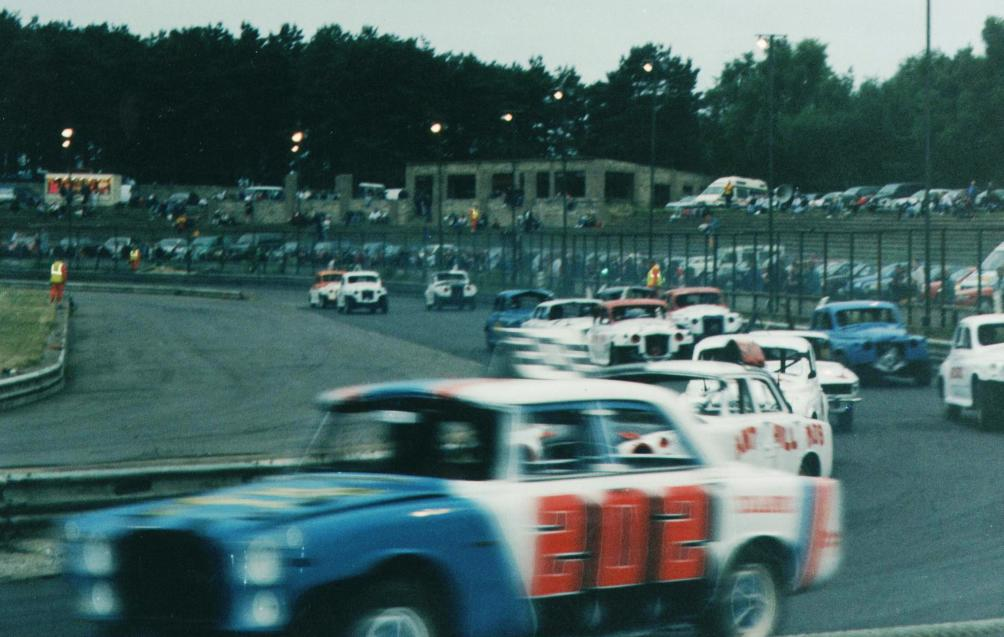
An "All-Rover" meeting at Ringwood Raceway in Hampshire. Such model-specific banger races have received criticism for unnecessarily destroying examples of said models in large numbers; a 2011 race at Arlington Stadium in Hailsham, for instance, destroyed over 100 Austin Westminsters.

Many vehicle enthusiasts, particularly classic car enthusiasts and automotive historians, object to banger racing, claiming it is responsible for the wanton destruction of restorable classic cars and their difficult-to-acquire parts, and is the reason why mid- and late-20th century vehicles from Ford, Austin, Rover, Jaguar, and Mercedes-Benz among other marques, along with uncommon special-configuration cars (such as hearses) and even some pre-war cars, have become increasingly rare. Banger racing enthusiasts claim that most of the vehicles used for banger racing are already damaged, destined for scrap, or otherwise beyond restoration, and that their use as a banger is a more fitting "send-off" than typical, "unceremonial" vehicle recycling methods such as crushing, shredding, abandonment, or intentional destruction in insurance fraud schemes. Regardless, many members of the banger racing community aim to assist preservation where possible by selling intact parts such as interiors and spare parts to owners, or placing age limits on the cars they use to avoid destroying older, rarer vehicles.

Criticism has also been aimed at banger racing regarding the uncommon use of stolen cars and car parts, even restored vehicles, and the lax efforts at some events to confirm proof of ownership. For example, in August 2022, a stolen 1985 Ford LTD Country Squire and 1965 Pontiac Grand Prix were destroyed at Ringwood Raceway. The drivers and vehicles were apparently not checked beforehand, and their identity as stolen vehicles was only determined after both had been raced and destroyed.

== See also ==
- Figure 8 racing – A similar sport in the United States
- Demolition derby – A 'last man standing' event commonly used to close banger race meetings
- Folkrace – A similar sport raced in Finland and Scandinavian countries
- "Mouldy Old Dough" – Widely regarded as the theme song for National banger racing
