= Hednesford Hills Raceway =

Motor racing venue in England

Coordinates: 52°42′31.15″N 1°58′40.71″W

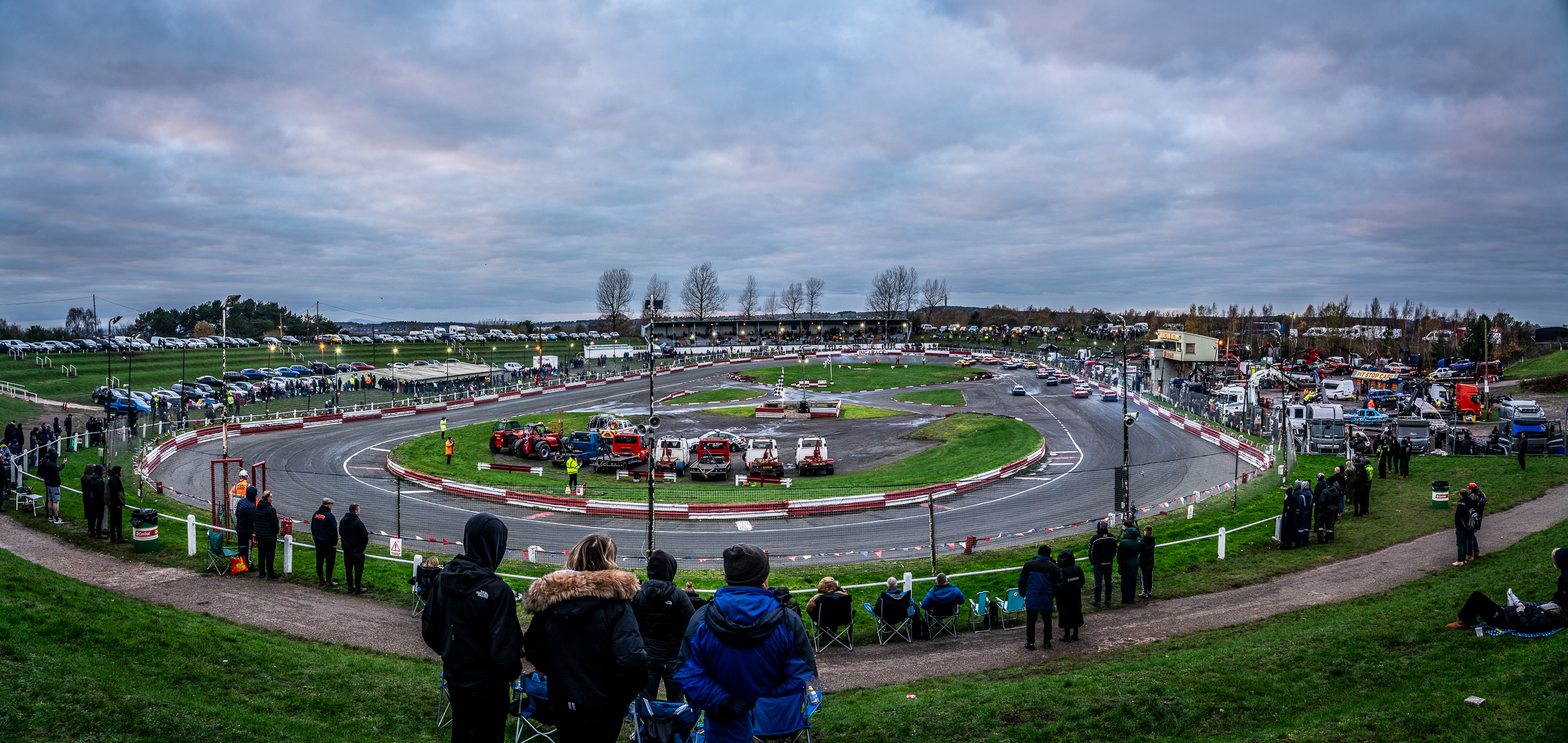
- Hednesford Hills Raceway in 2025
- Interactive map of Hednesford Hills Raceway
- Location: Hednesford, Cannock, WS12 1BF.
- Owner: Deane Wood
- Operator: Incarace (Spedeworth Group)
- Surface: Asphalt

Construction
- Opened: 1954

Hednesford Hills Raceway (often referred to as Hednesford Raceway) is an oval, short-circuit motor racing venue. It is situated on Cannock Chase, approximately 1-mile (1.6 km) from the town of Hednesford, Staffordshire, England and is operated by Incarace Ltd.

== About the circuit ==
The circuit was originally built inside a dis-used reservoir and operated by Claude Roe and Les Marshall in 1952, utilizing the site of a former reservoir, Scott House Reservoir, before opening for the first time in 1954. Due to failure in business, Roe and Marshall decided to abandon their plans for Hednesford Raceway and close down in 1955.

Following the closure of Tamworth Stadium in 1961, would-be promoter Bill Morris acquired the defunct Hednesford circuit and ran a handful of so-called 'practice meetings' in 1962. Bill Morris fully re-opened the circuit in April 1963 and from that point onwards the promotion of Stock Car and Hot Rod racing has been uninterrupted at the popular Staffordshire speed-bowl for over half a century.

The circuit is of a quarter of a mile in length, with two banked corners, and a tarmac track surface. The shale oval was eventually resurfaced with asphalt in 1966, enabling lap times to fall drastically and track records to tumble. It is even said that four times World Hot Rod champion Carl Boardley once got the quarter mile down to almost 12 seconds in unofficial practice, making Hednesford Europe's fastest quarter-mile oval.

With the circuit built at the base of the reservoir, the circuit has the advantage of being at the bottom of a large "bowl", with grass banks surrounding the circuit providing excellent views for spectators. For a small fee, spectators can even drive their cars onto the site and watch from their cars at viewing posts the top of the banks.

In addition to the grass banks surrounding the circuit, spectators can watch from terracing directly next to the track, along with two all-seater grandstands situated on the two corners, with covered seating for 3000 spectators. Other facilities include a permanent race control, licensed bar and cafe.

Bill Morris was the original promoter of stockcar racing on the site, having been inspired by friend Bill France's effort in Daytona (USA). In the early 1980s Bill retired from active promoting and handed over the reins to "Incarace", owned by his son Martin and Philip Bond.

In the late 1990s Martin retired and Philip Bond took over as sole promoter until retiring in March 2008.

William 'Bill' Morris founder of the Raceway died 9 October 2008.

Events at the circuit are still promoted and run by Midlands-based Incarace Ltd - which has now been taken over by Deane Wood, owner of Southern-based motorsports promotion Spedeworth International.

The stadium continues to be a flagship Short Circuit raceway in the UK.

== Events staged at the circuit ==
The circuit is a major venue for a number of National Hot Rods, BriSCA Formula 1 Stock Cars, BriSCA F2 and Banger racing events in the UK, with many formulas of racing being staged at the circuit. The circuit has also staged short-circuit truck racing events, and annually holds a large firework display. Major events include the "National Championship Weekend", the "Crash Cavalcade", "Veterans Day" and the "Civil War" - the oldest head-to-head banger meeting in the country.

== Trivia ==
The circuit has appeared on BBC's Top Gear programme in the past, in a feature on banger racing. In addition, a number of satellite TV channels feature both banger and stock car races from the circuit.

The Demons race team supplied a Car to Jeremy Clarkson a Ford Cortina for the Top Gear piece

The 100th edition of Tiswas was broadcast live from Hednesford Raceway back in the Seventies.

The launch of the Sony PlayStation game Destruction Derby Arenas took place at Hednesford Raceway and features a local Banger Racing team " The Demons Race Team "

Free Radio (network) have recorded a number of drive tests for Vauxhall Motors at Hednesford Raceway and are also an official partner of the venue, advertising each of the events held there.

The Scott House Reservoir was built in 1879 to hold water from nearby pumping stations but was abandoned in 1925 due to subsidence from local mining.
