= Gordon Moodie =

Racing driver

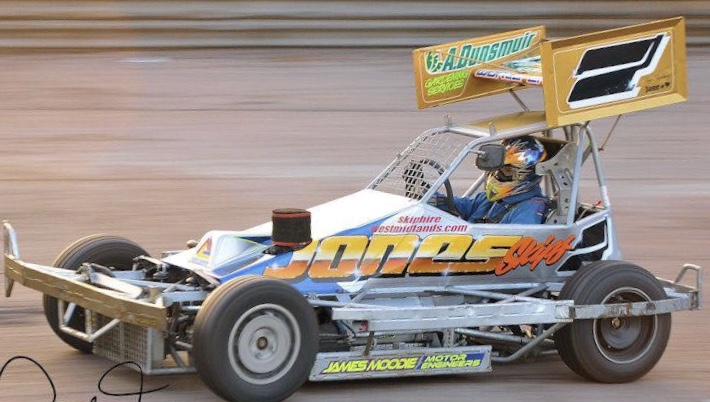
- Born: February 15, 1981 (age 45) Kirkcaldy, Fife, Scotland

BriSCA Formula 2 Stock Cars career
- Debut season: 1998
- Car number: 7

Gordon Moodie (born 15 February 1981) is a BriSCA Formula 2 Stock Cars racing driver from Windygates, Fife, Scotland, who races under number 7. Gordon Moodie is the most prolific major title holder in the 60+ year history of the sport. To date he has won 85 Championships including 5 World Finals and the National Points Championship/National Series 13 times. He also holds the all time record in oval racing history of having won 515 feature final wins.

== Racing career ==
Moodie began racing Formula 2 stock cars at the age of 17 in 1998, using one of his father’s cars and racing as number 79. After winning the World Championship in 2006, Moodie elected to race under number 7 in honour of his father, who used that number. Since then, Moodie has retained number 7.

Moodie’s first championship success came at the 2003 Scottish Championship at Cowdenbeath, a success which he regards as the turning point in his career. In the same season, Moodie won his first National Points Championship. It was the first of five consecutive National Points Championships, and Moodie also won another five consecutive titles between 2010 and 2014. He regained the National Points title in 2016, and again in 2017, but the silver roof was decided in a new shootout format called the National Series which he clinched at Belle Vue, Manchester.

Moodie finished first in the 2008 World Championship, but was subsequently disqualified and suspended from racing after scrutineering revealed a problem with his carburettor. Moodie proclaimed his innocence and later investigations revealed that there was a manufacturing fault in a batch of carburettors, of which Moodie’s was one. However, Moodie remained suspended and his lack of racing meant that he did not win the National Points Championship in both 2008 and 2009. A four-month ban imposed towards the end of 2014 saw Moodie miss the first half of the 2015 season, ruling him out of contention for the National Points Championship in 2015.

Moodie is the only British driver to have won the World Cup, raced for in August every year at Raceway Venray in the Netherlands, and holds the current record of seven wins.

== Honours ==
- World Champion: 2006, 2018, 2019, 2023, 2025
- National Points Champion: 2003, 2004, 2005, 2006, 2007, 2010, 2011, 2012, 2013, 2014, 2016, 2017 (Record Holder)
- Inaugural winner of the new National Series 2017 (previously known as National Points)
- Winner of the National Series 2018
- World Cup: 2007, 2008, 2009, 2014, 2015, 2019, 2024 (Record Holder)
- British Champion: 2007, 2014, 2021, 2023
- European Champion: 2006, 2009, 2012, 2014, 2022 (Record Holder)
- English Champion: 2005, 2009, 2012, 2018 (Record Holder)
- Scottish Champion: 2003, 2004, 2006, 2008, 2010, 2012, 2013, 2014, 2019, 2023 (Record Holder)
- Irish Open Champion: 2008, 2022, 2023
- Grand National Champion: 2003, 2004, 2006, 2011, 2012, 2013, 2016, 2019, 2024 (Record Holder)
- Benevolent Fund Trophy: 2002, 2009, 2015, 2017, 2019 (Record Holder)
- Challenge Trophy:

2006, 2011, 2014, 2022

- UK Open Champion: 2006, 2007, 2009, 2011, 2013, 2015, 2018, 2019, 2023 (Record Holder)
- Shoot Out Champion: 2014
- Gala Champion 2021
- BriSCA Nationals Champion 2022
- BriSCA Supreme Champion 2022
- Shale #lovef2s People’s Trophy 2022
- Record Holder 515 Feature Final Wins

Gordon was voted Kirkcaldy and Central Fife Sports Personality of the Year in 2013, 2018 and runner up in 2023.

In 2019, 2023 and 2024 he was presented by Fife Sport & Leisure Trust the Senior Award in recognition of his outstanding achievements in Motor Sport.
