= BriSCA Formula 2 Stock Cars =

Class of UK racing

Category	Stock car racing
Active since	1960
Country/region	United Kingdom The Netherlands Austria
World Champion	(Scotland) 7 Gordon Moodie
National Series Champion	(England) 183 Charlie Guichard
British Champion	(England) 667 Tommy Farrel
European Champion	(England) 414 Josh Raynor

BriSCA Formula 2 Stock Cars is a class of single seater auto racing in the UK. Cars are custom-built and race on oval tracks of either shale or tarmac of up to a quarter-mile in length. The tracks they race on are surrounded by either steel plate or post and wire fences to keep the cars on the track. Racing involves contact, drivers are allowed to push, punt or spin fellow competitors out of the way. The cars are very strong and are of an open wheel design, but are designed with the contact element in mind, with front and rear bumpers and a sturdy chassis and roll cage.

== History ==
BriSCA F2 Stock Car racing was introduced in a demonstration meeting at Tamworth in August 1960. Initially named ‘Junior Tens’, the formula was designed to be a cheaper option to Senior Stock Cars, now BriSCA Formula 1 Stock Cars. The first full season of competitive racing began in 1961. ‘Junior Tens’ became ‘Juniors’ and then eventually ‘BriSCA Formula 2’. The formula grew very quickly in the 1960s, with race meetings held in many different parts of the UK. The south west became a particular stronghold of the sport. In the present day, there are over 200 race meetings each season, and over 600 registered drivers.

== Cars ==
A modern BriSCA F2 is a purpose-built race car with front engine, rear-wheel drive, and open-wheeled with the driver located centrally. Cars make use of an aerofoil mounted on top of the roof that is similar to those found on American Sprint cars. Cars are normally powered by a 2-litre 8 valve Ford Pinto engine, or a 2 - litre 16v Ford Zetec engine which is the more popular choice being the faster engine.

Some drivers use two separate cars; one will be set up primarily for use on shale or dirt ovals, while the other car will be set up for tarmac, concrete or asphalt ovals; however a few drivers with limited budgets may optimise just one vehicle for both surface types, changing various components and set up for each different track and surface.

== Races ==
BriSCA F2 Stock Car races are normally held on short oval tracks, either tarmac or shale. The number of drivers per race is usually between 20 and 30 cars. Contact is allowed, and drivers push opponents from the racing line in order to pass. Deliberate fencing and following-in is not allowed.

Each driver is graded according to past results, their roofs painted accordingly: red aerofoils with amber flashing lights are known as 'superstar' grade drivers; then red, blue, yellow and white. The lowest grade drivers (white) start each race at the front of the field, while superstar drivers start each race from the rear of the field. Championship winners are also designated specific roof colours: gold for the World Champion, silver for the Shootout Series Champion, black and white checks for the British Champion, red and yellow checks for the European Champion,Saint George's Cross for the English Champion, Saint Andrew's Cross for the Scottish Champion and Green and White checks for the Irish Champion.

== World Championship ==
The World Championship is an annual competition and the premier BriSCA F2 championship. The winner is granted the honour of racing with a gold roof and wing until the next World Final. The World Final is usually held in September. The host tracks, all of which are based in Britain, are chosen by the designated promoter.

The grid for the World Final is composed of drivers from Britain who are chosen through a series of qualifying rounds and two World Championship Semi-Finals. Drivers who fail to progress from the World Semi-Finals may race again in a Consolation Semi-Final to choose two more entrants, and the reigning World Champion is entitled to start at the rear of the grid if they have not already qualified. The British drivers are joined by stock car drivers from the Netherlands, Northern Ireland and the Isle of Man.

The most successful driver in World Final races is Rob Speak, who has won eight. Other notable multiple winners include Bill Batten (four), Dave Brown (three) and Gordon Moodie (five).

== National Points Championship (1962-2016) and National Series (2017- ) ==
The National Series is a championship raced over approximately 11 race meetings towards the end of the season. Around 18 drivers are invited to take part based on meeting attendance, points scored and championship results. The winner is the driver who amasses most points over the series and is granted the honour of racing with a silver roof for the following season.

From 1962 to 2016, the silver roof was awarded to the winner of the National Points Championship: the driver who scored the most points at every stock car meeting throughout the season.

The most successful driver in National Points Championship and National Series history is Gordon Moodie, who has won thirteen. Other notable drivers include Rob Speak (eleven), Roy Goodman (nine), Bill Batten (six), Barry Goldin (three)Gary Hooper (three) and Blake Robertson (one)

== Tracks ==
The current BriSCA F2 UK tracks are:

- Bristol, Mendips Raceway
- Buxton Raceway
- Cowdenbeath Racewall
- Crimond Raceway
- Hednesford Hills Raceway
- King's Lynn, Norfolk Arena
- Knockhill Racing Circuit
- Mildenhall Stadium
- Northampton International Raceway
- Skegness Stadium
- Scunthorpe Raceway
- St Day, United Downs Cornwall
- Taunton, Smeatharpe Stadium
- Nutts Corner, Northern Ireland
- Ballymena Showgrounds, Northern Ireland (formerly)
- Tullyroan Oval, Northern Ireland (formerly)

Although not part of the official BriSCA calendar, BriSCA F2 drivers also occasionally compete at Ter Apel, Emmen, Posterholt, St Maarten, Venray in the Netherlands and Warneton in Belgium.
