= Stock car racing in the United Kingdom =

Stock car racing in the United Kingdom covers a number of different oval racing formulas.

The most notable difference between British Stock car racing and other nations is that contact is allowed in certain UK formula, that is, if you are unable to pass an opponent using speed alone, you are allowed to push or hit your opponent in order to pass. The degree of contact allowed varies from so called "nudge and spin" racing to "full contact" where drivers are permitted to drive their opponents directly into the walls of the raceway.

== History ==
Stock car racing started in the United States in 1915 and began in Europe in the 1950s. It was brought to Britain in 1954, following a series of races at Buffalo Stadium in Paris which had been well received. Australian promoter "Digger" Pugh, a former circus showman, and British motor racing journalist John Bolster, a former racing driver, were involved in organising the first meeting in the United Kingdom.

The first meeting took place at New Cross Speedway, a GRA greyhound stadium in London, on Good Friday 1954. The shale oval, nicknamed "The Frying Pan", was only 278 yards (254 m) in length. It was physically impossible for cars to pass each other without contact, so the organisers decided to legalise it. The stadium was packed to capacity with a crowd of 26,000 people.

The cars were mostly road cars from the 1930s with locked rear axle differentials and added armour for contact racing. After the first couple of years custom-built cars began to appear eventually making the 'stock' car name something of a misnomer. Since the early days of stock car racing in Britain the sport has developed into many different classes. In addition, non-contact oval racing became known as Hot Rods, while the original kind of armoured road car used in the 1950s developed into saloon stock cars and unarmoured cars raced in full contact banger racing.

== Open-wheel Stock car formulas ==
Stock car formulas are largely split into two organisations broadly based in the north and south, BriSCA and Spedeworth.

BriSCA Formula 1 Stock Cars are the most sophisticated stock car formula. Each vehicle races with a race-tuned V8 engine developing approximately 650 bhp. The cars are also fitted with quick-change axles, roof-mounted aerofoils, cambered wheels and brake setups for constant left turning. The chassis of each vehicle is also offset. Large bumpers are mandatory and contact is encouraged to push opponents out of the way. The Smaller BriSCA Formula 2 Stock Cars are also very popular. They are essentially a downsized version of the Formula 1 Stock Car, being powered by a 2-litre Ford engine. V8 Hotstox are a third BriSCA formula that race. They are a much cheaper class to race and use the Rover V8 engine. This class is often used as a stepping stone to the Formula 1 class.

Licensed and promoted by Spedeworth are the Superstox. Superstox are similar to BriSCA Formula 2 Stock Cars with the main visual difference being a smaller wing on the roof. These cars are also powered by the 2-litre Ford Pinto engine. Spedeworth also run V8 Stock Cars, which are similar in design to the BriSCA Hotstox, but use small-block 5-litre Chevrolet engines.

Stoxkarts run 13 hp Honda engines. This formula is one where more than one driver can use the same car in the same meeting.

At the budget end of the racing spectrum is the growing Modstox formula. Visually similar to Formula 2 and Superstox, the formula is limited to the 850cc Reliant engine with other prescribed budget components, making it a starter or 'last chance' formula for more senior drivers.

== Closed-wheel Stock car formulas ==
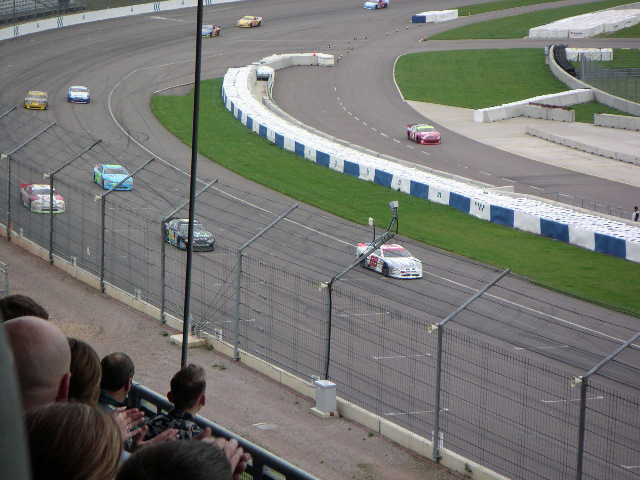
An ASCAR race at Rockingham during the 2004 season.

In 2001 the ASCAR Racing Series was formed and ran until 2008, the series was a "NASCAR" style racing series that was predominantly run at Rockingham Motor Speedway as well as briefly on the continent. The first season was won by John Mickel. Other notable champions were Nicolas Minassian and Ben Collins who also played as The Stig on Top Gear. The field was usually populated by professional or semi-professional stock car drivers, however notable drivers who were famous from other areas of motorsport either took part in single races or for one complete season, they included Colin McRae, Jason Plato, Matt Neal, Darren Manning, Max Papis, John Cleland and former NASCAR drivers Brandon Whitt and Randy Tolsma.

Another one of the most popular forms of UK stock car racing are the 2-Litre National Saloon Stock Cars, regulated by the Saloon Stock Car Association. This formula is typically based on heavily armoured Ford Sierra, Ford Mondeo, Vauxhall Vectra and Audi A6 models, purposely reconstructed for this full contact class.

The 1400cc Stock Cars hold very similar build specification to the 2-Litre Nationals, with cars being armoured all the way around. The major difference between the two are the different cars used. The smaller engine capacity means cars are a lot smaller and lighter. Most are front-wheel drive like the Vauxhall Corsa, Vauxhall Tigra and Honda Civic, however the class does allow the rear-wheel drive Toyota Starlet.

Rebels are a one-make purpose built formula also using the 850cc reliant engine with slight modifications, in a steel chassis with 'retro' plastic panels designed to give the look of a scaled down post-war Ford Popular.

== Hot Rods ==
Hot Rods are a non-contact race formula where each vehicle is based on a road car, or made to resemble a road going counterpart. The concept for the National series is similar to that of NASCAR. The cars that race resemble production cars, but are in fact purpose built space frame chassis with a Kevlar body which mimics a production car. Other Hot Rod categories do make use of standard production body/chassis.

== Bangers ==
Bangers are production cars that are raced with modifications for safety such as reinforced drivers' doors, H-frame roll cages added and all glass removed. The racing can be either "full contact" or limited contact. Full contact is when wrecking usually takes more importance than the racing with drivers some times having head on crashes to take out opponents. Limited contact on the other hand only allows some lighter crashing and spinning of cars with the racing aspect still being a key focal point. That said, this sport is not a Destruction Derby, although some banger meetings do end with one.

== Junior formulas ==
Ministox are one of the most popular routes for junior drivers to progress into senior stock car classes. Every car racing in must be derived from a Mini branded car. The cars resemble both senior closed wheel stock car classes in their build, but the speeds reached are generally lower to reduce risk levels. Drivers are encouraged to learn the racecraft and tactics that the senior drivers use in the 1400cc and 2-Litre Nationals.

Together with the Ministox, there are several formulae that cater for junior drivers interested in progressing up contact formulas.

There are also several non-contact classes for the juniors, which are often cheap and accessible steps towards the senior rod formulas.
