= Hot Rods (oval racing) =

Motorsport in the United Kingdom

Hot Rods refers to a number of British oval racing formula (not to be confused with hot rods, which are generally road-going modified vintage cars). Hot Rod racing was introduced at Hednesford Hills Raceway in the early 1960s as a British counterpart to NASCAR-style production car racing. The term 'stock car' was not adopted because it was already in use for a form of oval racing in Britain that had evolved in a very different way than American stock cars.

In south west England, hot rod racing evolved from a class known as sports and production car racing, which began at to be held at tracks in Plymouth and St Austell in the 1950s.

Most vehicles that race are based upon European or Japanese hot hatches, although compact cabriolet cars such as the Vauxhall Tigra are also widely used. As time has moved on, the sport has evolved to allow sportier cars such as the Ginetta G40, Lotus Exige and Mazda MX-5 to be raced, in order to increase the variety of cars on track. Races are conducted on tarmac ovals 1/4 mile in length. Despite deliberate contact between cars being banned, accidents can be common due to the large number of cars (30+) racing within a tight environment.

The fastest and most expensive Rod formula are the National Hot Rods (not to be confused with the American-based National Hot Rod Association) which use tube chassis, kevlar bodies and highly tuned 2 litre straight-4 engines. This formula also races in Ireland, continental Europe and South Africa. They have similarities with some of the more sophisticated mini-stock divisions in the USA. The World Championship race for the National Hot Rods is staged at the annual spedeweekend at Foxhall Stadium in Ipswich, which is traditionally held during the first weekend of July each year.

A smaller class known as 2 Litre Hot Rods are the next class down and are usually considered a stepping stone to the National class. Using smaller Hatchback style cars such as the Vauxhall Corsa and Citroën Saxo . Their annual World Championship race is held at various tracks in England and Scotland, With every third running being staged at either of the two Spedeworth-sanctioned tracks (Tullyroan Oval or Aghadowey Oval) in Northern Ireland.

== World Championship ==
First held in 1972, The World Championship Race for the National Hot Rods is considered the biggest and most important race of the year.

In its early years the title befitted from the invitation of drivers from across the globe. Later years have seen the event take on a more domestic focus, although frequently featuring European and South African representation where the formula also race.

Year	Venue	Winner	Car Model
1972	Ipswich	(England) 108 Bob Howe	Ford Escort mk1
1973	Ipswich	(England) 351 Barry Lee	Ford Escort mk1
1974	Ipswich	(England) 351 Barry Lee	Ford Escort mk1
1975	Ipswich	(England) 304 Derek Fiske	Ford Escort mk1
1976	Ipswich	(England) 306 George Polley	Ford Anglia
1977	Ipswich	(England) 351 Barry Lee	Ford Escort mk2
1978	Ipswich	(England) 351 Barry Lee	Ford Escort mk2
1979	Ipswich	(England) 356 Gordon Bland	Ford Escort mk2
1980	Ipswich	(England) 19 Mick Collard	Ford Escort mk2
1981	Ipswich	(Northern Ireland) 962 Ormond Christie	Toyota Starlet
1982	Ipswich	(Northern Ireland) 932 Davy Evans	Vauxhall Chevette
1983	Ipswich	(Northern Ireland) 962 Ormond Christie	Toyota Starlet
1984	Ipswich	(England) 88 Peter Grimer	Toyota Starlet
1985	Ipswich	(Northern Ireland) 962 Ormond Christie	Toyota Starlet
1986	Ipswich	(Northern Ireland) 950 Norman Woolsey	Toyota Starlet
1987	Ipswich	(England) 306 George Polley	Toyota Starlet
1988	Ipswich	(England) 63 Phil White	Toyota Starlet
1989	Ipswich	(Northern Ireland) 950 Norman Woolsey	Peugeot 205
1990	Ipswich	(Northern Ireland) 942 Davy McCall	Peugeot 205
1991	Ipswich	(England) 413 Roger Peck	Toyota Starlet
1992	Ipswich	(England) 63 Phil White	Vauxhall Nova
1993	Ipswich	(Northern Ireland) 950 Norman Woolsey	Peugeot 205
1994	Ipswich	(England) 639 Ricky Hunn	Peugeot 205
1995	Ipswich	(England) 96 Ian McKellar	Peugeot 205
1996	Ipswich	(Northern Ireland) 962 Ormond Christie	Ford Fiesta mk3
1997	Ipswich	(Northern Ireland) 962 Ormond Christie	Ford Fiesta mk3
1998	Ipswich	(England) 718 Colin White	Ford Fiesta mk3
1999	Ipswich	(England) 718 Colin White	Volkswagen Corrado
2000	Ipswich	(England) 718 Colin White	Volkswagen Corrado
2001	Ipswich	(England) 175 John Steward	Vauxhall Corsa B
2002	Ipswich	(Northern Ireland) 942 Davy McCall	Peugeot 206
2003	Ipswich	(England) 230 Dave Longhurst	Mitsubishi Colt
2004	Ipswich	(England) 911 Malcolm Blackman	Peugeot 206
2005	Ipswich	(Northern Ireland) 994 Keith Martin	Peugeot 206
2006	Ipswich	(England) 41 Carl Boardley	Vauxhall Tigra A
2007	Ipswich	(England) 41 Carl Boardley	Vauxhall Tigra A
2008	Ipswich	(England) 41 Carl Boardley	Vauxhall Tigra A
2009	Ipswich	(England) 41 Carl Boardley	Vauxhall Tigra A
2010	Ipswich	(England) 115 Chris Haird	Vauxhall Tigra B
2011	Ipswich	(England) 911 Malcolm Blackman	Peugeot 206 CC
2012	Ipswich	(Northern Ireland) 9 Glenn Bell	Vauxhall Tigra A
2013	Ipswich	(Northern Ireland) 962 John Christie	Vauxhall Tigra A
2014	Ipswich	(England) 115 Chris Haird	Vauxhall Tigra B
2015	Ipswich	(Republic of Ireland) 970 Shane Murphy	Vauxhall Tigra A
2016	Ipswich	(Northern Ireland) 76 Adam Maxwell	Vauxhall Tigra B
2017	Ipswich	(England) 115 Chris Haird	Vauxhall Tigra B
2018	Ipswich	(England) 305 Billy Wood	Vauxhall Tigra A
2019	Ipswich	(Scotland) 17 Robert McDonald	Vauxhall Tigra A
2020	Not held due to COVID-19 pandemic		
2021	Ipswich	(Scotland) 17 Robert McDonald	Vauxhall Tigra A
2022	Ipswich	(Scotland) 17 Robert McDonald	Vauxhall Tigra A
2023	Ipswich	(Northern Ireland) 20 Derek Martin	Vauxhall Tigra A
2024	Ipswich	(Scotland) 17 Robert McDonald	Ginetta G40R
2025	Ipswich	(Scotland) 17 Robert McDonald	Ginetta G40R
2026	Ipswich	(Northern Ireland) 9 Glenn Bell	Ginetta G40R

== Numbering System ==
As the sport developed across the country in the 1970s there was some confusion as drivers from different regions and promoters found themselves racing with the same numbers. The National Hot Rod Promoters Association (NHRPA) decided to introduce a national numbering system to help stop confusion, this format was used up until 1989.

- Incarace 1-299
- Spedeworth 300-599
- PRI 600-699
- West Country (Autospeed) 700-799
- Scotland 800-899
- Northern Ireland 900-999

== See also ==
- Stock Car Speed Association, American-style stock cars in Britain.
