= South Limburg coal mining basin =

Coal mining basin in Limburg, Netherlands

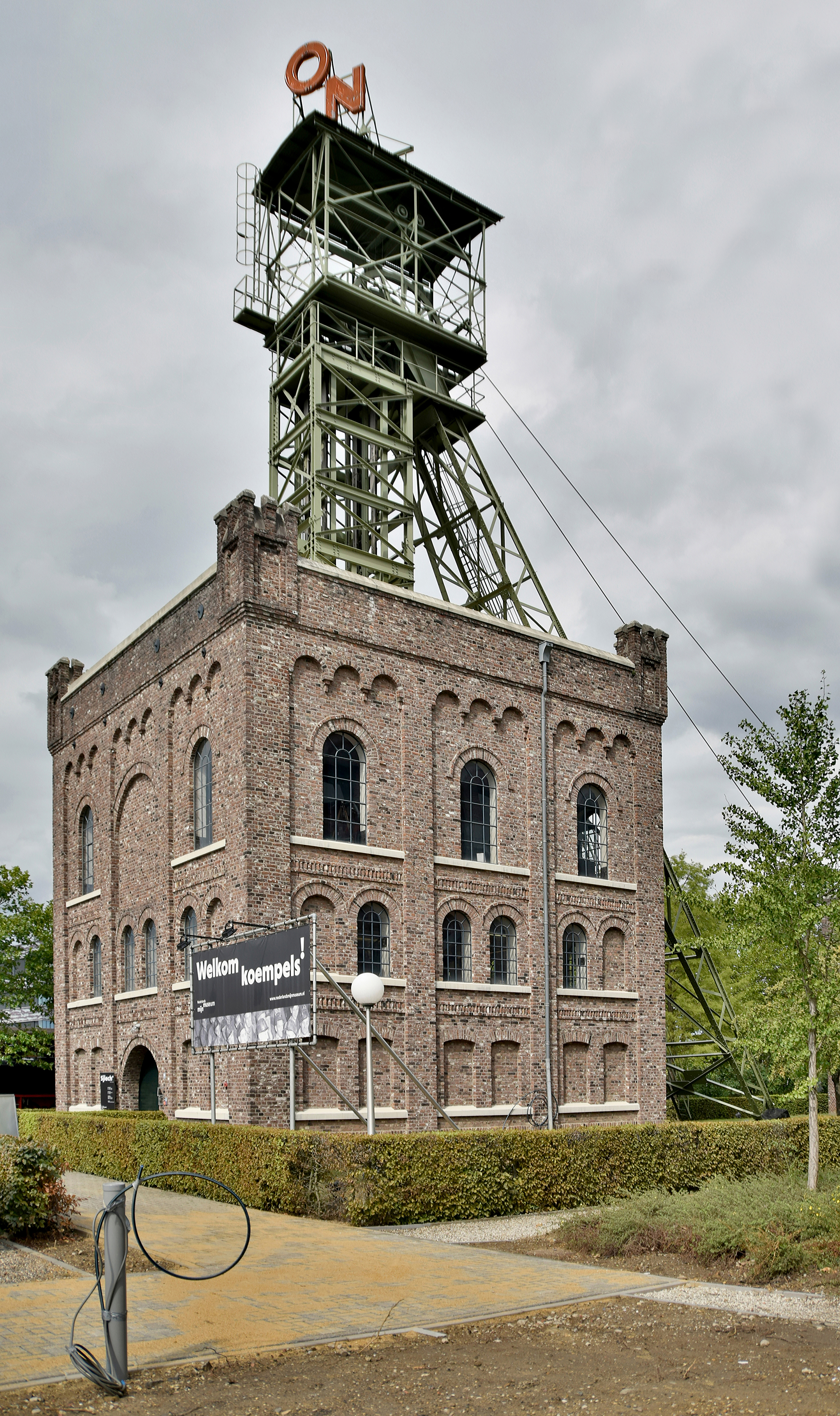
Former Coal mijn Oranje-Nassau I in Heerlen in September 2020

Coal mining in Limburg, a province of the Netherlands, has taken place since the 16th century.

Near the Augustinian Abbey of Rolduc, coal was found very close to the surface. The abbey owned the coal, and beginning in the 16th century hired local miners to extract the coal for sale as fuel. The mines of the abbey were the precursor of the first dutch states mine the Domaniale mine in Kerkrade. This mine was started in 1815.The true extent of the coal reserves in the south-east corner of Limburg first became apparent in 1870, when the wealthy Count Marchant and Ansembourg of Brussels ordered the first boreholes to be drilled near Eygelshoven, and a substantial seam of coal was found at a depth of 154 metres.

The demand for coal had grown explosively as a result of increased industrialization and urban expansion, but the national governments regarded any form of interference in the extraction and sale of this fuel as unnecessary. Thus it came about that the first concessions for the extraction of coal in South Limburg were granted without hesitation to foreign firms, although most of the coal consumed in the Netherlands was imported from Germany, and Dutch investors preferred to invest their capital in foreign countries, such as in Russian government loans, American railways, and Hungarian waterworks.

== State interference ==
Around 1900 the first voices were raised for nationalization of the Limburg coal fields, in the context of the threat of war in the Balkans. In 1897 the Venlo-born priest parliamentarian Dr. Willem Nolens uttered in the Lower Chamber of the Dutch parliament the phrase that would eventually lead to the formation of the Limburg State Mines: "A country that does not know how to use its natural resources of wealth demonstrates that it is not worthy of them".

In 1903, a start was made on the Wilhelmina state mine, and four years later the first coal from this mine came onto the market. In 1910 the net production of the state mines was 192,000 tonnes, and the total personnel numbered 1,479. Thirty years later, four mines financed by state money had been taken into production, and had overtaken the private mining sector. Production had reached almost eight million tonnes and the number of employees was 23,633. The biggest mine in the Limburg coal basin, and the biggest in Europe, was the Maurits state mine, which was the last to be taken into operation, in 1926, and the first to be closed down, less than forty years later.

The twelve Limburg pits had together produced around 600 million tonnes of coal when the cabinet of Jo Cals decided to completely close down coal production in the province of Limburg, and the then minister of economic affairs, Joop den Uyl, decided to make a personal visit to the mining centre of Heerlen to announce his decision. A natural gas field had been discovered in the province of Groningen, a gigantic reservoir of clean energy that would be much cheaper to exploit than coal from Limburg, which by then had to be fetched to the surface from a depth of over 800 metres.

== Impact of the mining industry ==
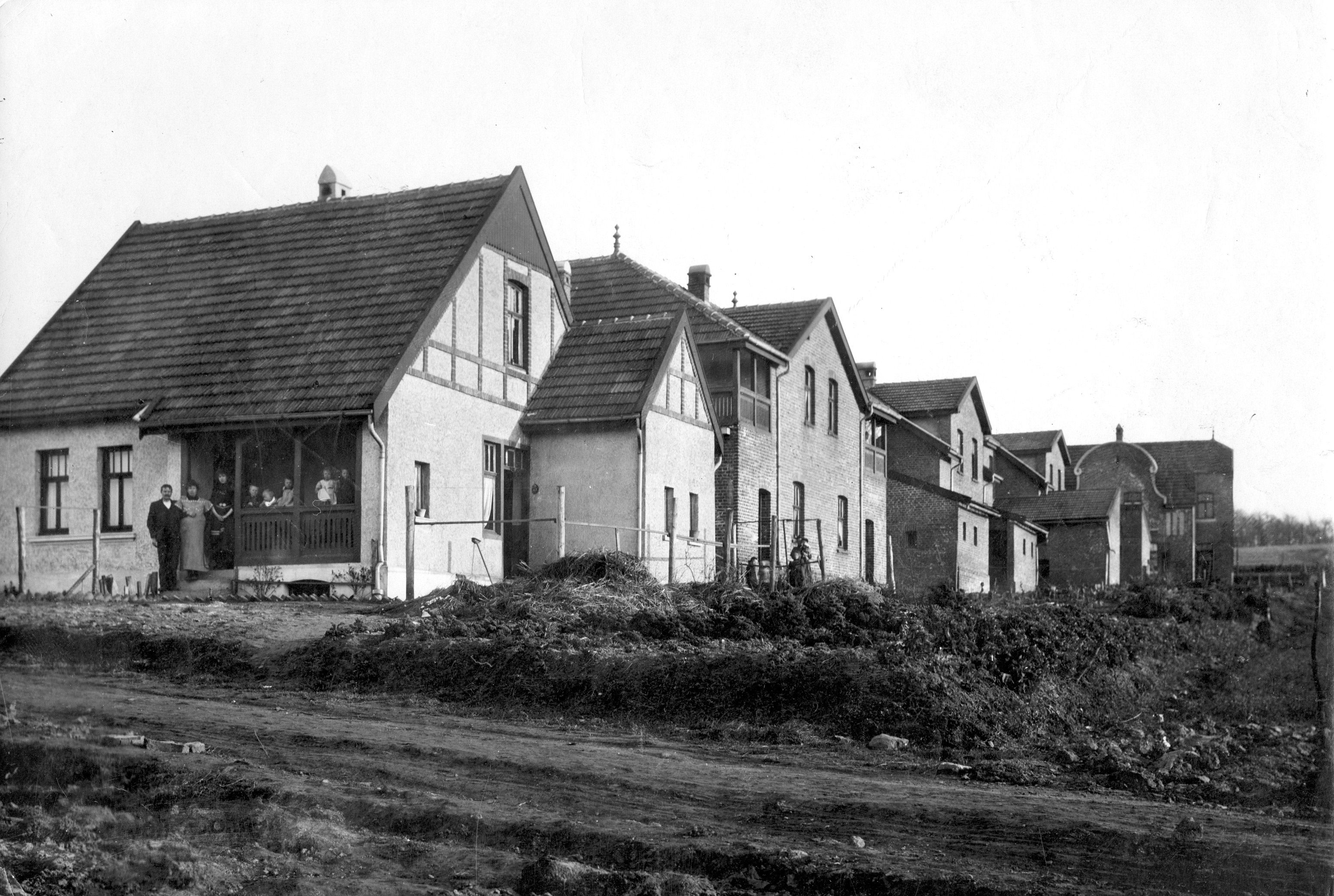
Houses in the miners' colony near Eygelshoven, 1914

In three quarters of a century the mining industry had drastically altered the eastern corner of South Limburg in every aspect. When the first pitheads were built, this was an agricultural region of small villages with a population of scarcely 22,000. By the time the mines were closed down, more than ten times as many people lived there, and it was one of the most densely populated parts of the Netherlands, second only to the Randstad, the urban agglomeration in the western part of the country.

The mining industry had attracted a host of supply industries and an excellent infrastructure of railways and canals had been built to facilitate the transport of coal to domestic and foreign markets. The Juliana Canal was constructed for this purpose in the years 1925–1936, and in the same period a 13 kilometer long railway line was built between Schaesberg and Simpelveld to cater for daily passenger traffic. This line became known as the 'million line', because it cost more than a million guilders per kilometre of track to lay it, a record sum for those days.

The most far-reaching changes, however, took place at the social level. There was a massive influx of workers to take up jobs in the mines. They came not only from all corners of the Netherlands, but also from older mining areas in Germany, Poland, Italy, Spain, Morocco and elsewhere. In 1939 almost 700 foreigners of nine different nationalities lived in Kerkrade, which had become the largest mining town in Europe.

Mine management began to build houses for their workforce at an early stage, so that mineworker colonies arose, such as that at Lutterade near Geleen. Because there were numerous social problems in the mining area, and most of the miners were Roman Catholic, the bishop of Roermond took an interest in them. In 1910, the priest-exegete Dr. Henri Poels (1868–1948) was posted as a working chaplain to the mine area, where he introduced the concept of social action. Dr. Poels, who was a member of one of the leading families of "De Grote Compagnie" in Venray, thereby laid the foundations for a social structure in which all the various population groups were integrated, and it was he who stood up for the material rights of the miners. He stimulated the formation of interest groups based on the 'harmony' model, and although this cooperative union between capital and labour found little or no resonance elsewhere in the Netherlands, it was to some degree responsible for the fact that the government-initiated mine closures in and after 1965 did not result in any significant social or political conflict.

== The end of mining ==
On December 17, 1965, the Dutch government announced the complete termination of coal mining. The consequence of the decision for employment, the social and economic structure and cultural and social developments in South Limburg were enormous, as all the Dutch mines were located in this area. Seventy-five years of mining had turned the south of the province of Limburg into one of the most densely populated areas of the Netherlands. The mines had resulted in the creation of supply industries and an infrastructure of roads, railways and waterways, mainly aimed at the transportation of coal within the Netherlands and abroad.

At the end of the 1950s, more than 55,000 people were employed in the mines. At the peak of the mining industry in 1960, 70% of the population of the Limburg mining region was directly or indirectly dependent on the mines.

When the last mine closed its doors in 1976, 45,000 people had lost their jobs. In addition, another 30,000 indirectly linked jobs with supply industries (particularly in building and the metal sector) were lost. The newly unemployed had difficulty finding other work, because their training was usually inadequate or completely related to the mining industry. In 1977, unemployment within the province of Limburg was twice as high as in the Netherlands as a whole.

As a result of the marked decline in employment, the expendable income in the mining area also fell. This had serious consequences for the prosperity of the region and for the retail trade. The Limburg mining area was in danger of becoming one of the impoverished regions of Europe.

On August 1, 1977, Dr. Kremers was appointed as Queen's Commissioner of the Dutch province of Limburg. As Queen's Commissioner, Dr. Kremers conducted an active economic policy to reduce the effects of the mine closures and to push back unemployment.

The economic restructuring policy for the province of Limburg was aimed at:

- the creation of alternative employment within the already existing chemical factories of the mines.
- the stimulation of new industries.
- the relocation of a number of large government services from the seat of the government in The Hague to the province of Limburg.

In 1975, the provincial government commissioned an independent company, the Industriebank LIOF to support existing employment and attract alternative employment. Since 1975, this organization has brought over 100 companies to the province of Limburg.

In 1982, the provincial government drew up a plan to stimulate tourism in South Limburg. The plan was aimed at four specific fields: conference tourism, holiday tourism, water sports and recreational facilities for a day trip. Conference tourism was given a considerable boost with the building of the Maastricht Exhibition and Congress Centre (MECC).

One of the offspring of the mining industry that survives till today is the chemical company DSM - a multinational active in various branches of the chemical industry. It still has a large industrial complex in Geleen.
