= Sjeng =

Sjeng may refer to:

- Sjeng (name), a Dutch given name
- Sjeng (software), a chess-and-variants playing program
