= Blitterswijck =

- Village
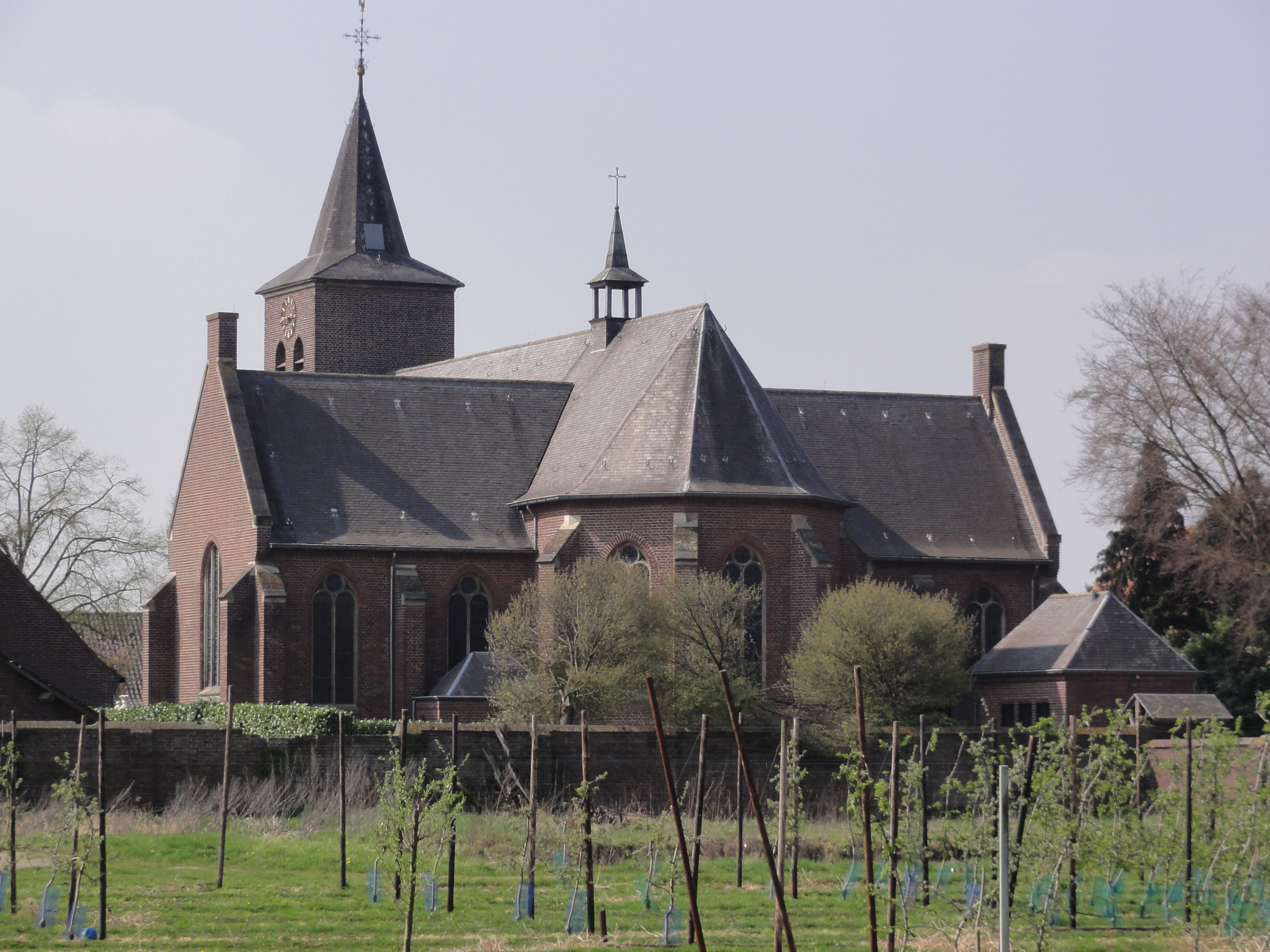
- Onze Lieve Vrouwe Church

- Flag

- Location in the Netherlands Location in the province of Limburg in the Netherlands
- Coordinates: 51°31′55″N 6°6′20″E
- Country: Netherlands
- Province: Limburg
- Municipality: Venray

Area
  - Total: 6.53 km^{2} (2.52 sq mi)
- Elevation: 18 m (59 ft)

Population (2021)
  - Total: 1,145
  - Density: 175/km^{2} (454/sq mi)
- Time zone: UTC+1 (CET)
  - Summer (DST): UTC+2 (CEST)
- Postal code: 5863
- Dialing code: 0478

Blitterswijck (Dutch pronunciation: [ˈblɪtərsʋɛik]; Limburgish: Blitterswik [ˈblɪtəʀswɪk]) is a village in the Dutch province of Limburg. It is a part of the municipality of Venray, and lies about 20 km north of Venlo.

The village was first mentioned in 1242 as "Willem van Blitterswijck", and means "settlement of Blicter (person)". Blitterswijck developed along the Maas near a castle. In 1815, it became part of the Kingdom of the Netherlands.

Castle Blitterswijck probably dated from the 14th century. In 1670, it was restored and redesigned in 1806. The castle was destroyed in 1944 and only ruins remain.

The Catholic Onze Lieve Vrouwe Church is a double aisled church and dated from around 1500. In 1944, it was severely damaged. The nave was restored between 1950 and 1951. In 1953, a larger tower was added. The Dutch Reformed church is an aisleless church founded by Barones Mackay in 1828.

Blitterswijck was home to 444 people in 1840. The village was severely damaged by war in 1944.

== Gallery ==
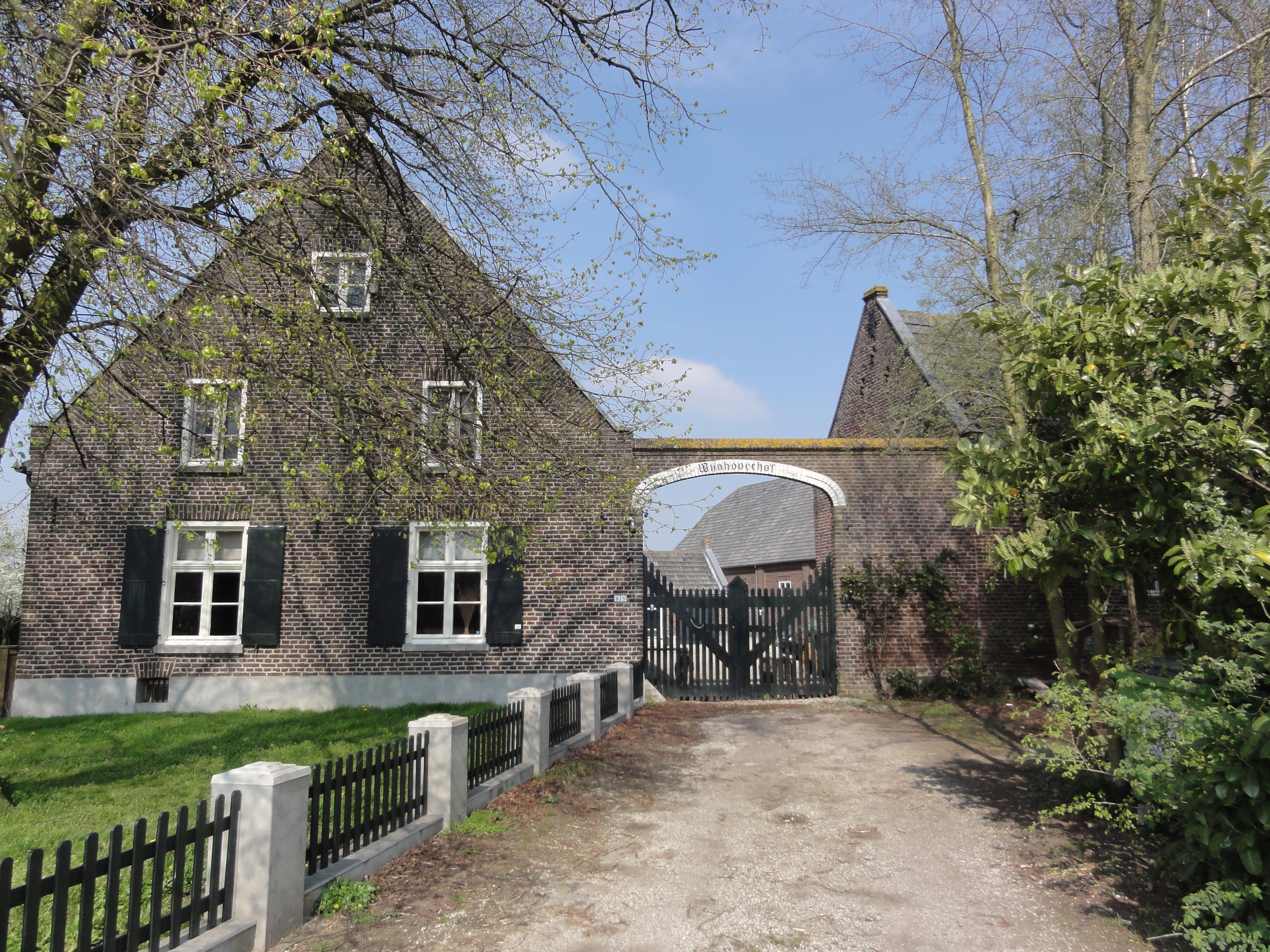
Farm in Blitterswijck

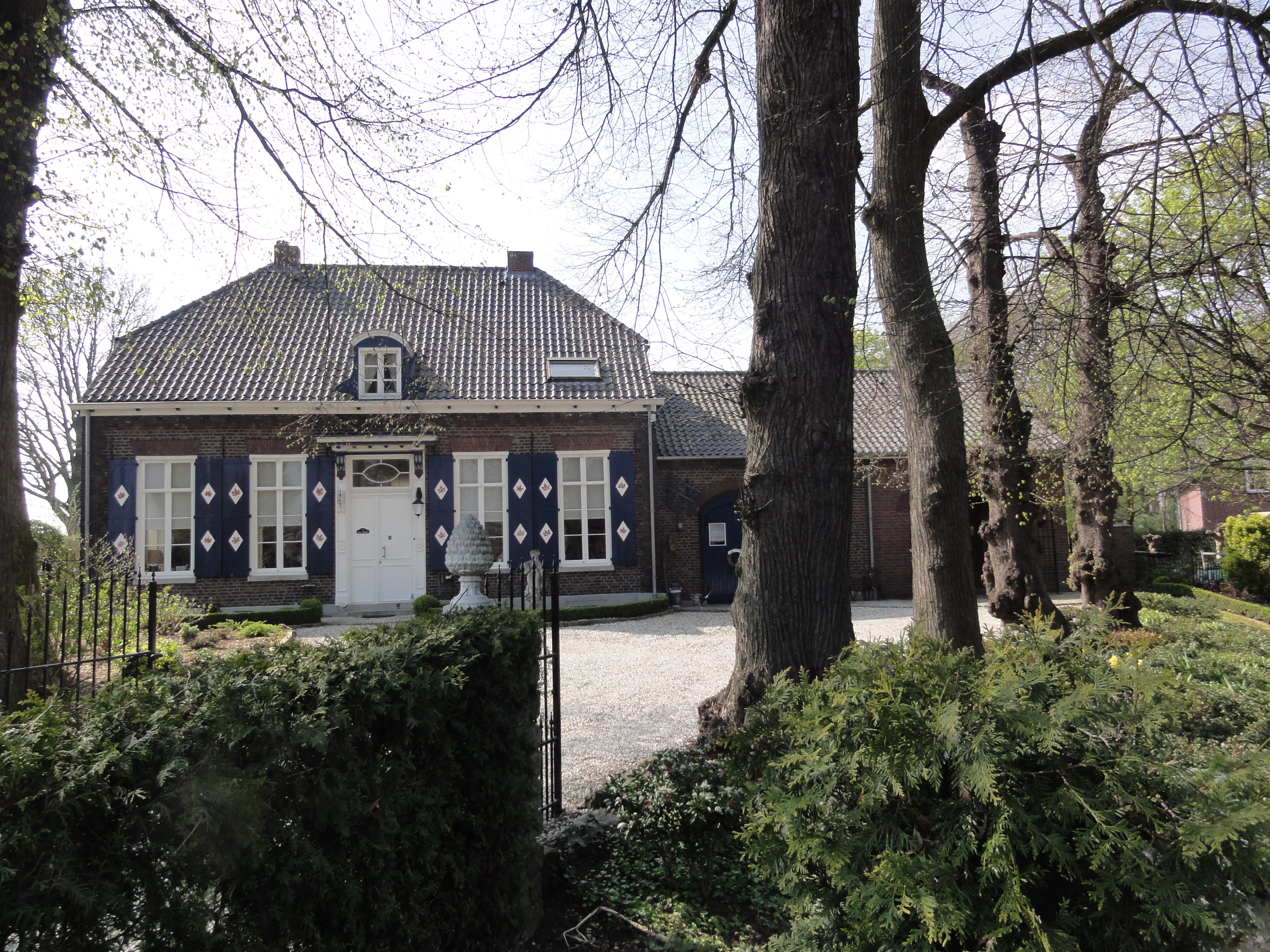
Clergy house

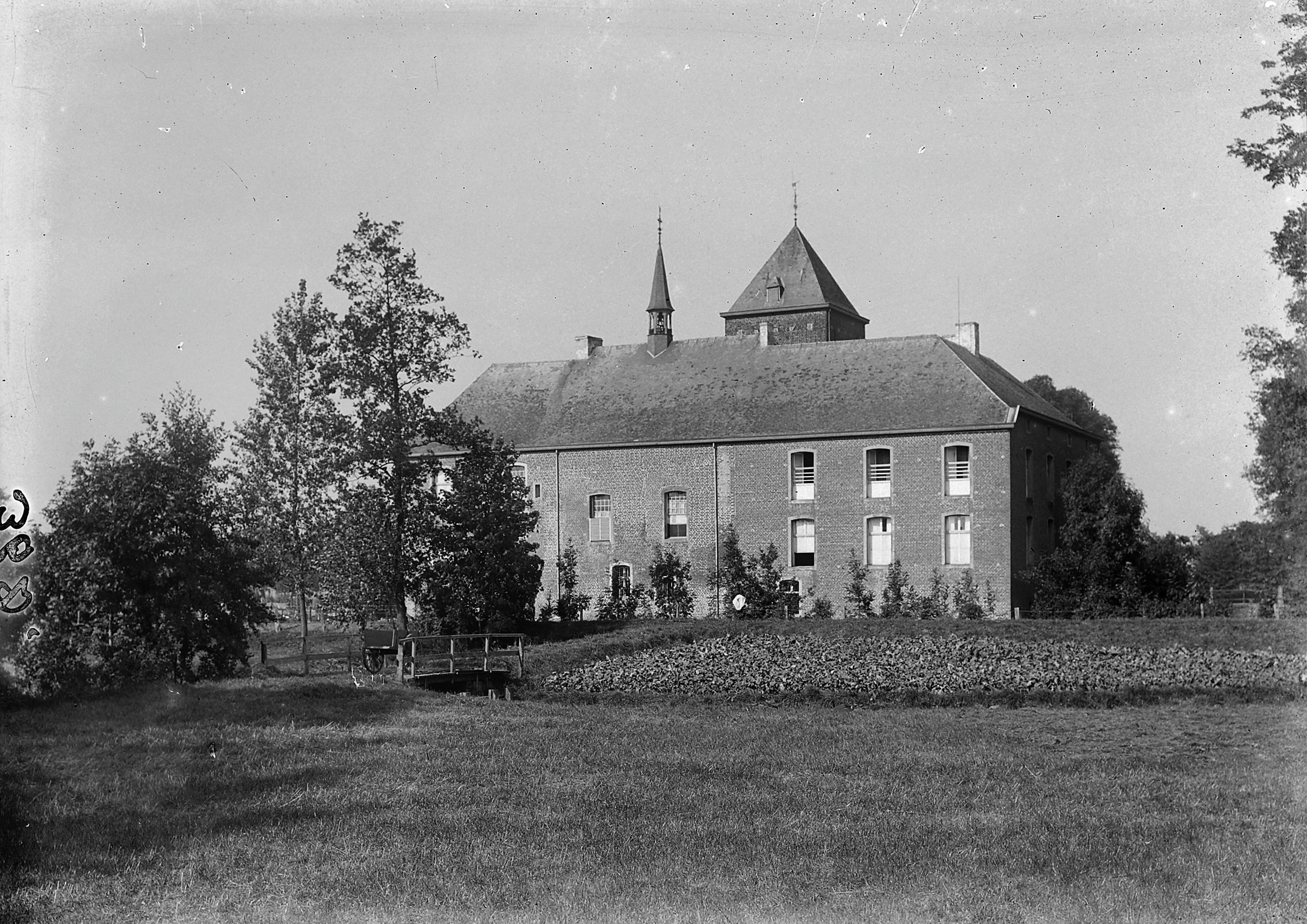
Former castle (before 1944)

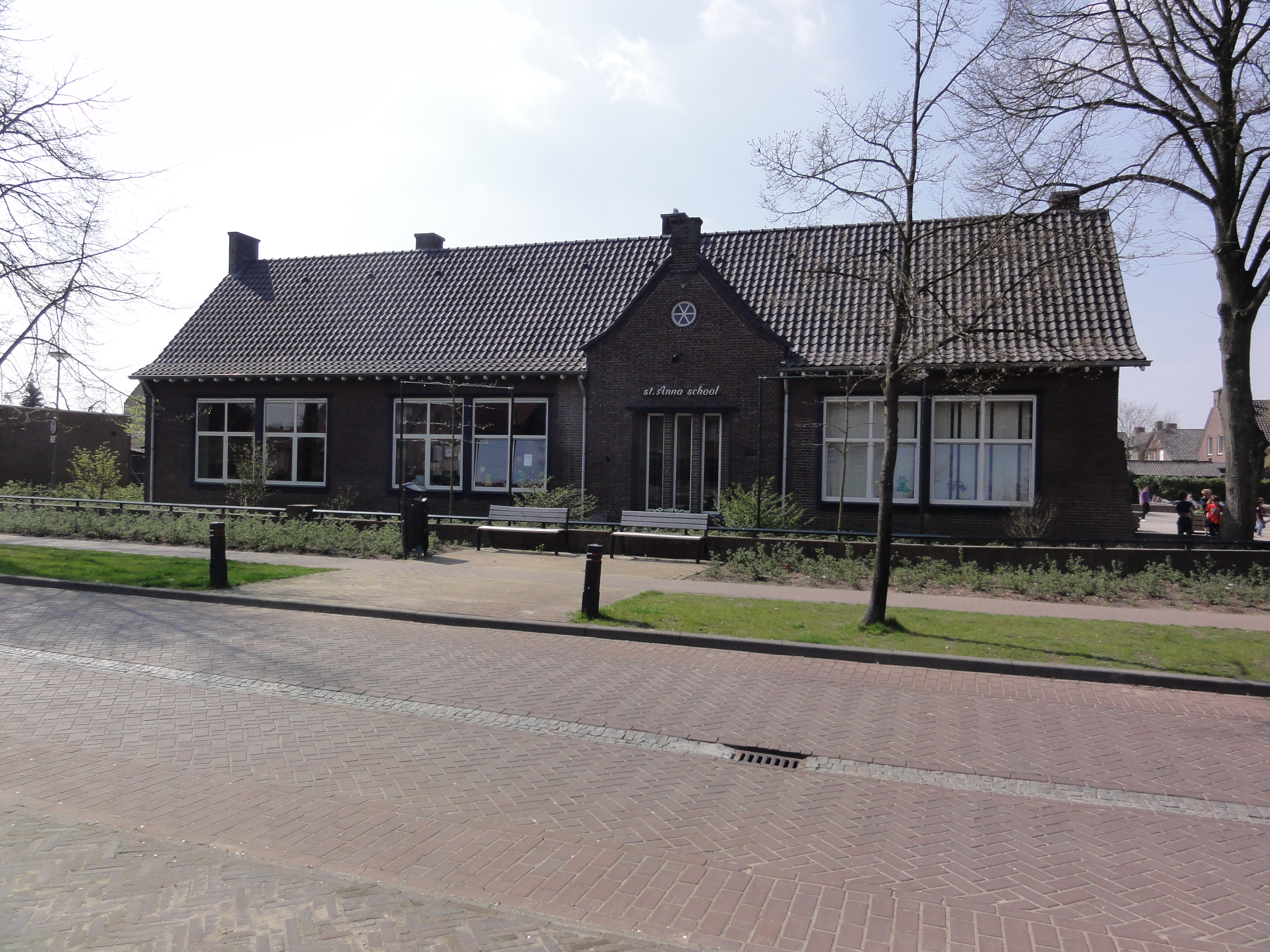
School
