= Rutgerus Sycamber =

Rutgerus Sycamber or Roger of Venray (b. 1456/57, d. after 1509) was a humanist, music theorist, and a prolific but little-published writer. He was a canon regular of the Augustinian Order based for most of his life at the monastery of Hagen near Worms.

Sycamber is notable for the expansiveness of his correspondence with other humanists in Germany, the Netherlands and France, among them Erasmus, Johannes Trithemius, Robert Gaguin and Wigand Wirt, the last debating the Immaculate Conception. His latest known letter is dated 3 September 1507. He was part of a circle of literary men living in the cities of southwest Germany, and was known for his "aggressive self-promotion."

Sycamber was born in Venray in upper Gelderland, close to the border with the Duchy of Cleves. In antiquity, this was the territory of the Germanic people called by the Romans the Sicambri, Sigambri, Sugambri, etc., and from this ethnonym he took his Latin surname. It can thus be surmised that he self-identified in some sense as "German."

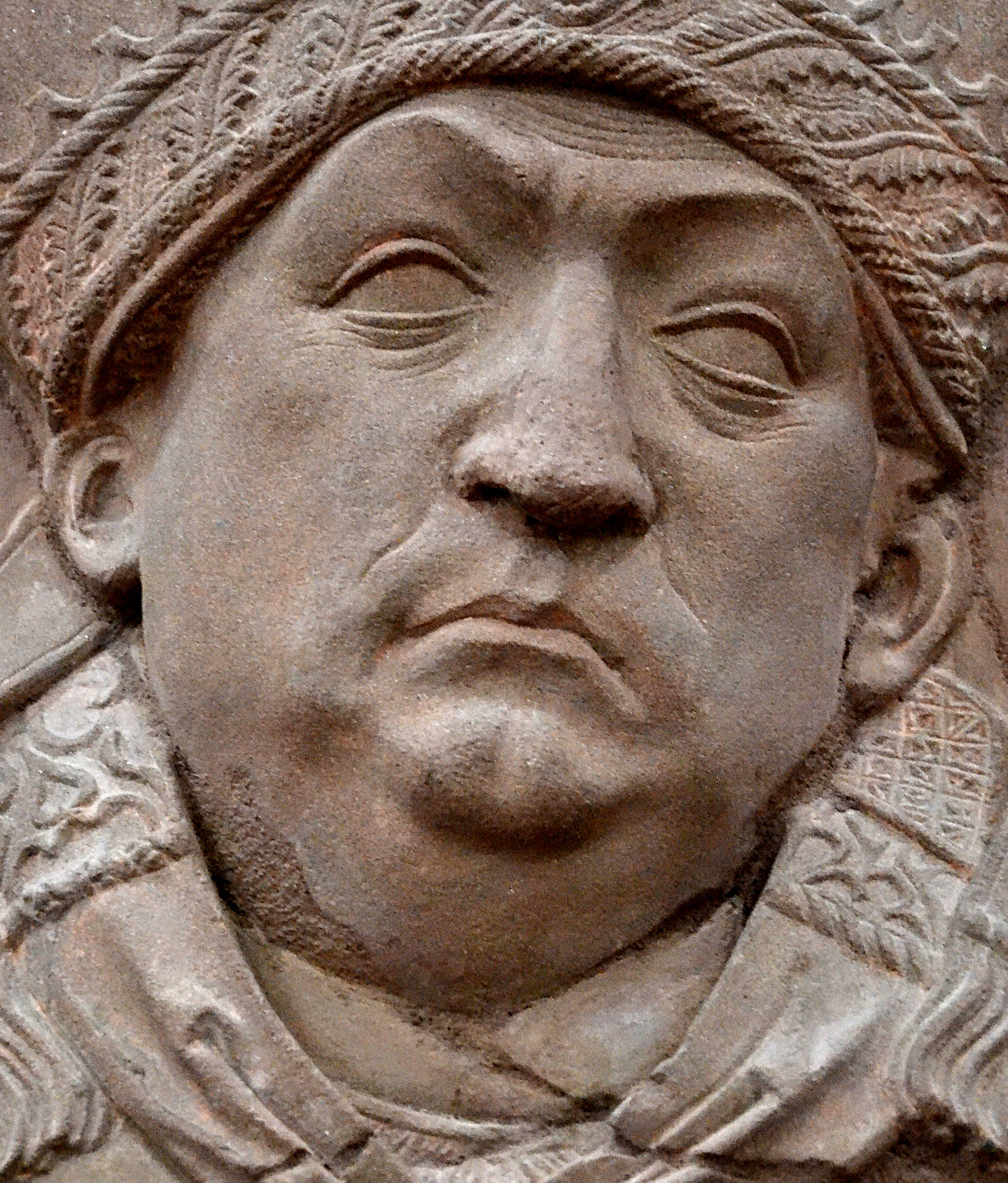
Trithemius, friend of Rutgerus Sycamber, who remarked on the "countless offspring" that issued from his pen

Little known in the 21st century, Sycamber was a prolific but "rather mediocre" writer. Between 1495 and 1505, he produced as many as 140 opuscula in both poetry and prose, which have survived only erratically. Despite his wide network of influential literary contacts, few of his works were published. Even his friend Trithemius remarked on his prodigious if unavailing output:

Our Rutgerus Sycamber is writing books as is his habit and produces countless offspring — so many that it is wearisome to me even to list individual titles … for he has completed (to use his own word) 136 works of his lucubrations in four volumes and he has not stopped writing today."

Sycamber's Dialogus de musica (ca. 1500), also known as De recta, congrua devotaque cantione dialogus, dealt with the correct performance of chant in the liturgy. Other published works are De quantitate syllabarum (Cologne, 1502) and Litania ad omnes sanctos (Deventer, 1514). The former is written as a dialogue between Sycamber and the dedicatee, the teacher (magister) Jacob Sonnenschyn, to whom Sycamber also addresses appended poems.

== Sources ==
- Unless otherwise noted, biographical information comes from R.A.B. Mynors, D.F.S. Thomson, and Wallace K. Ferguson, Collected Works: The Correspondence of Erasmus, Letters 1 to 141, 1484 to 1500 (University of Toronto Press, 1974), pp. 138–139 online.
- Detailed bibliographical information is provided by Konrad Wiedemann, entry on Sycamber in Contemporaries of Erasmus: A Biographical Register of the Renaissance and Reformation (University of Toronto Press, 1985, reprinted 1995), pp. 301–302, limited preview online.
- Further bibliography of primary sources by Paul Oskar Kristeller, Iter Italicum: A Finding List of Uncatalogued or Incompletely Catalogued Humanistic Manuscripts of the Renaissance in Italian and Other Libraries (Brill, 1983), vol. 3, pp. 336 online and 594 online.
- Three letters written by Sycamber (dated January 1498, where his tone is described as "uncooperative and even petulant," June 1503, and September 1507) appear in English translation in Barbara Crawford Helporn, The Correspondence of Johann Amerbach: Early Printing in Its Social Context (University of Michigan Press, 2000), pp. 74–80 online and p. 337 online.
