= Castenray =

- Village
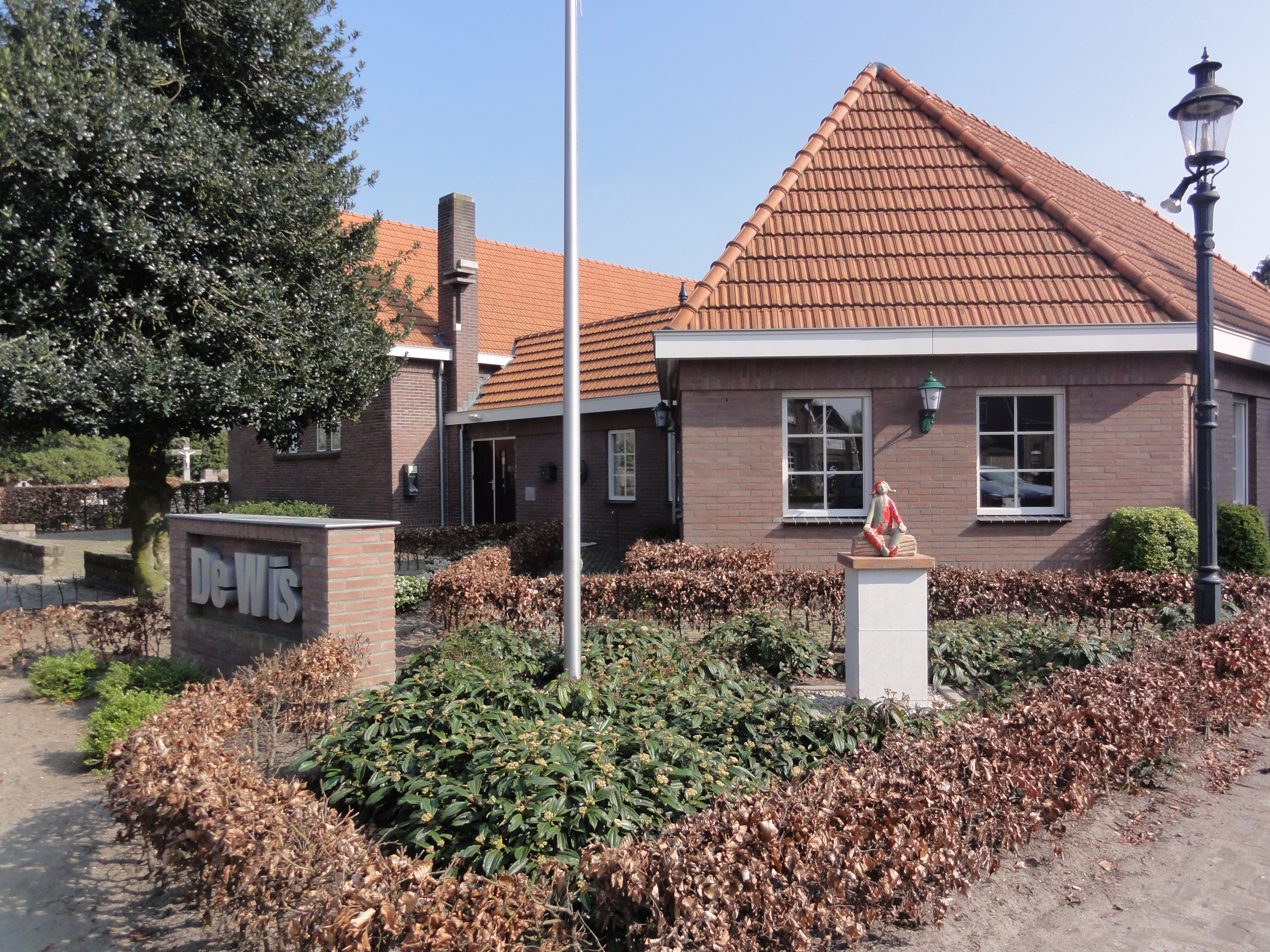
- Community house

- Location in the Netherlands Location in the province of Limburg in the Netherlands
- Coordinates: 51°29′20″N 6°2′8″E
- Country: Netherlands
- Province: Limburg
- Municipality: Venray

Area
  - Total: 9.50 km^{2} (3.67 sq mi)
- Elevation: 26 m (85 ft)

Population (2021)
  - Total: 835
  - Density: 87.9/km^{2} (228/sq mi)
- Time zone: UTC+1 (CET)
  - Summer (DST): UTC+2 (CEST)
- Postal code: 5811
- Dialing code: 0478

Castenray is a village in the Dutch province of Limburg. It is a part of the municipality of Venray, and lies about 17 km northwest of Venlo.

The village was first mentioned in 1409 as Casterloe. The etymology is unclear. Castenray was home to 211 people in 1840.

== Gallery ==
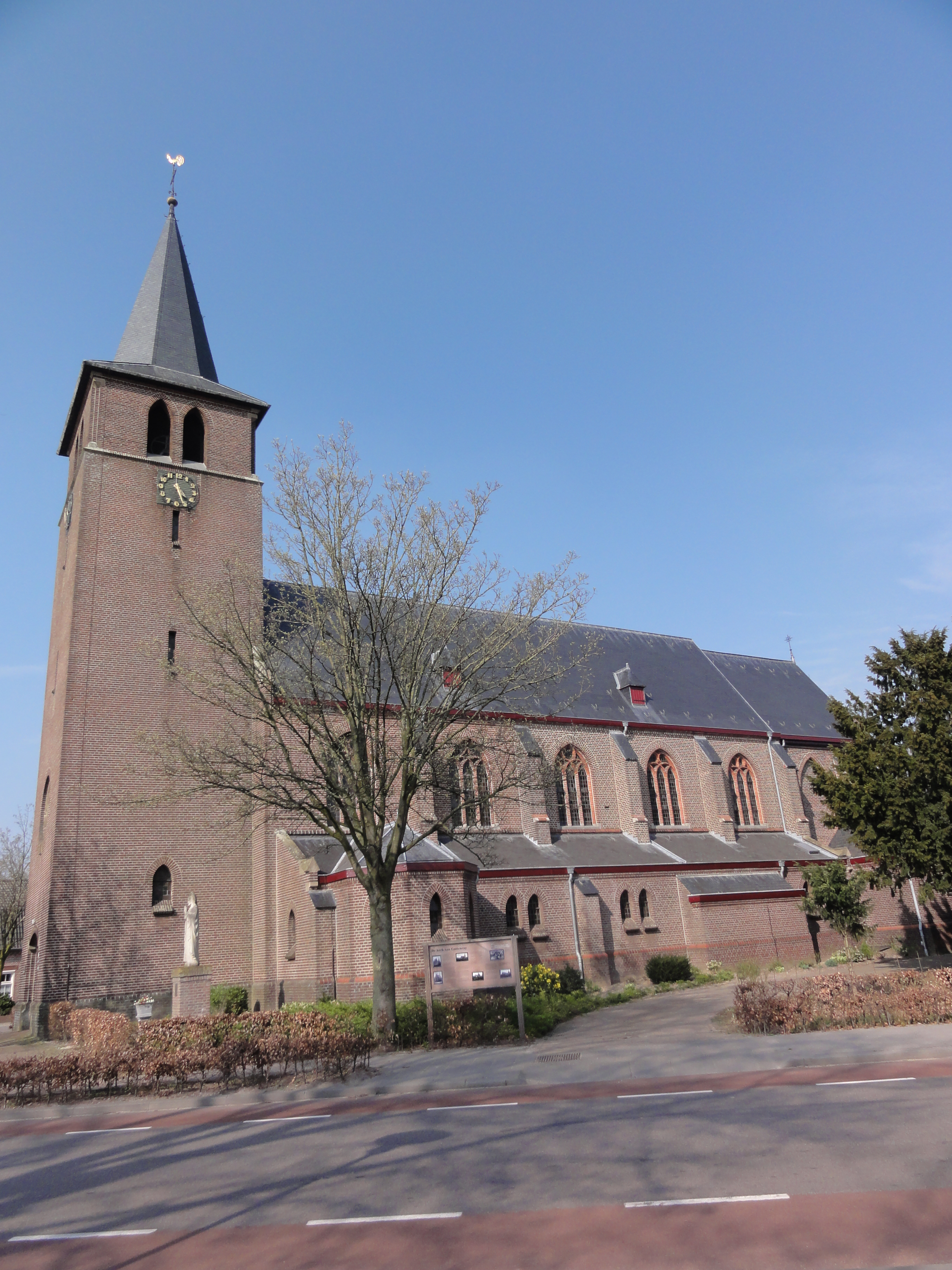
St Matthias Church

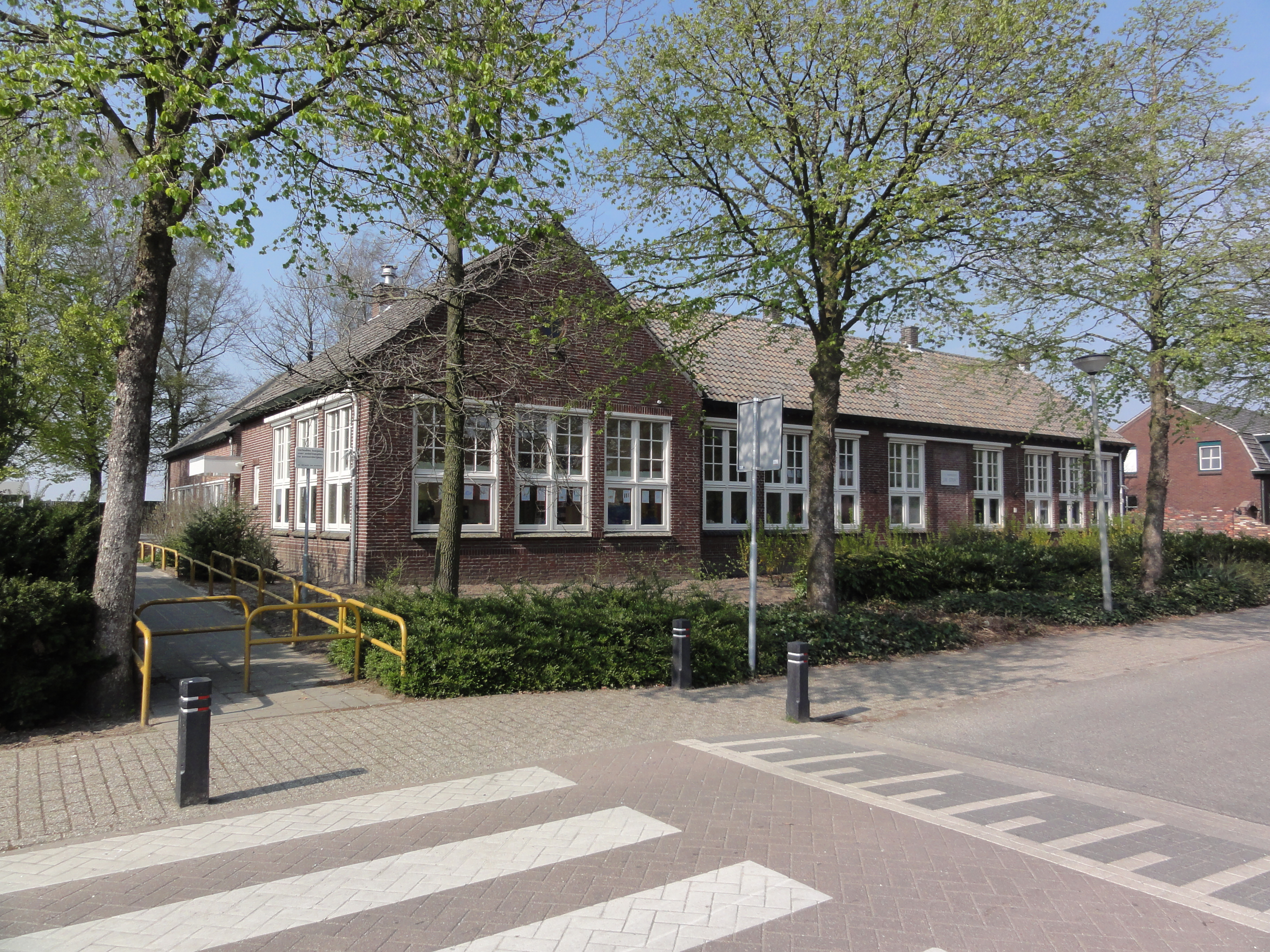
School in Castenray

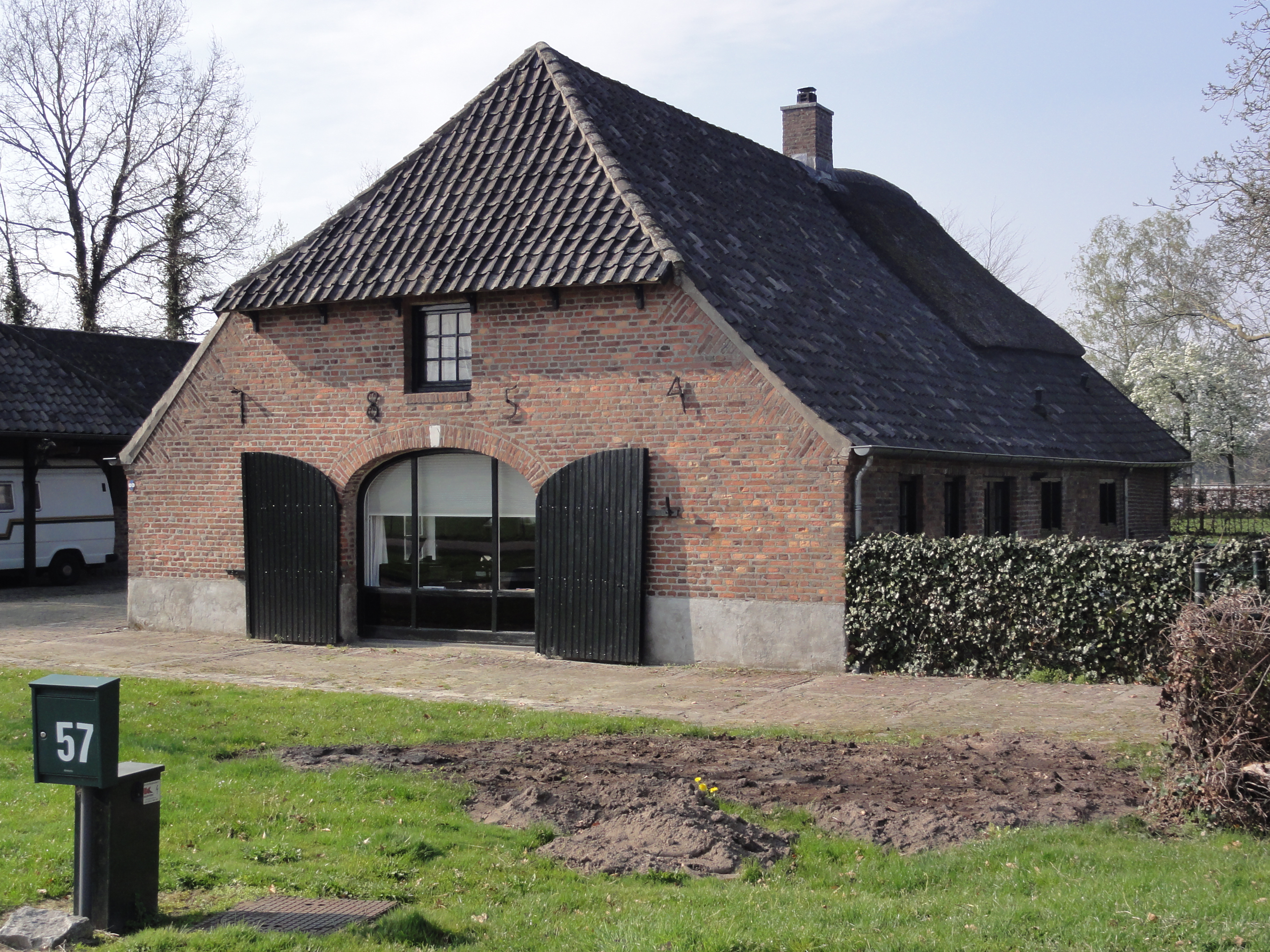
Farm in Castenray
