= Heide, Venray =

Heide
- Village
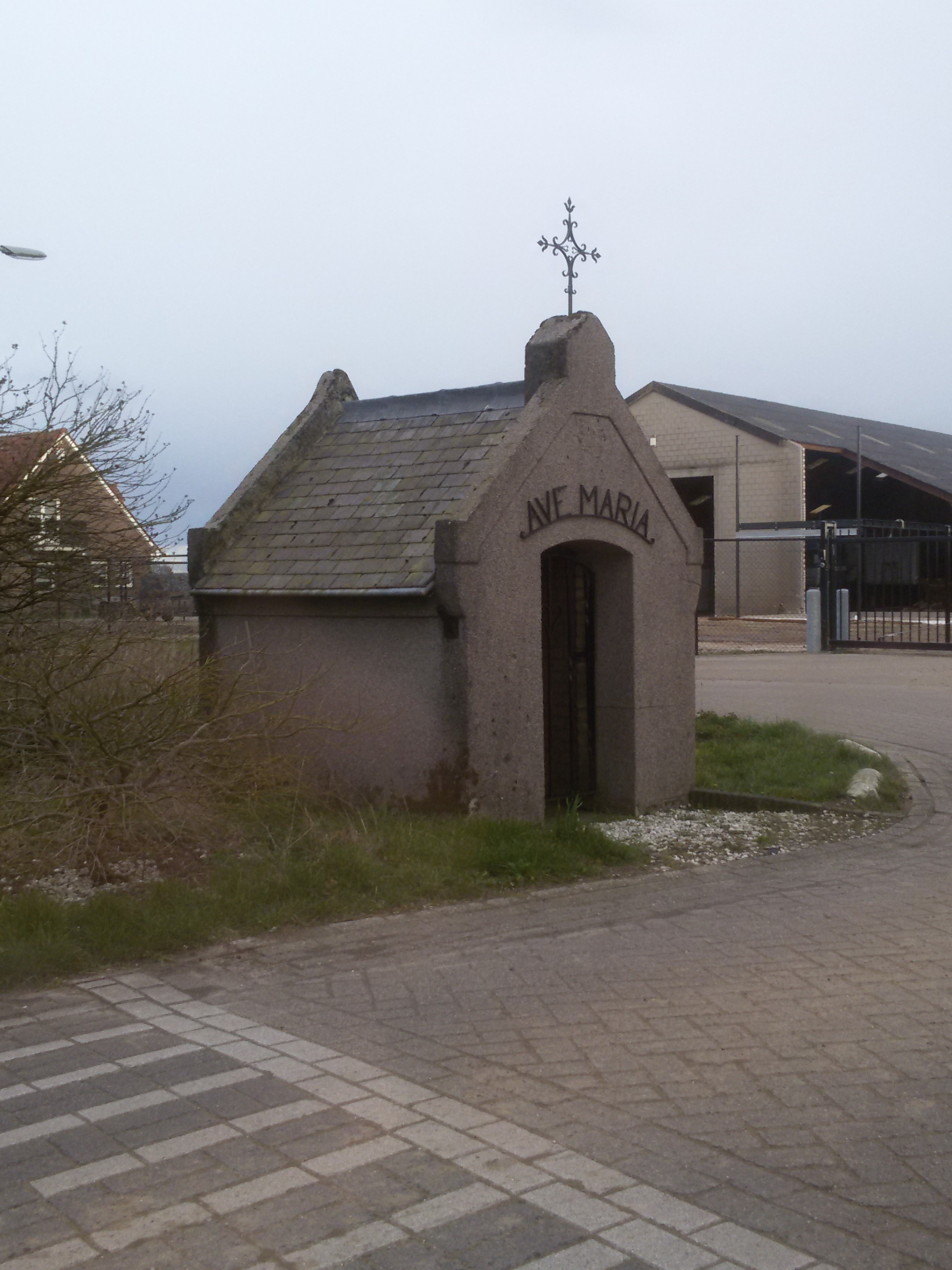
- Mary chapel

- Location in the Netherlands Location in the province of Limburg in the Netherlands
- Coordinates: 51°30′18″N 5°57′1″E
- Country: Netherlands
- Province: Limburg
- Municipality: Venray

Area
  - Total: 5.52 km^{2} (2.13 sq mi)
- Elevation: 28 m (92 ft)

Population (2021)
  - Total: 495
  - Density: 89.7/km^{2} (232/sq mi)
- Time zone: UTC+1 (CET)
  - Summer (DST): UTC+2 (CEST)
- Postal code: 5812
- Dialing code: 0478

Heide is a village in the Dutch province of Limburg. It is a part of the municipality of Venray, and lies about 20 km east of Helmond.

The village was first mentioned between 1838 and 1857 as "de Heijde", and means cultivated heath. Heide is located on the edge of the Peel region. In 1946, a temporary church was built. The building was replaced by a real church in 1965.
