= Sjeng (name) =

Male given name

Sjeng is a Dutch masculine first name. The name can still be found in Dutch Limburg particularly in the south, in and around Maastricht. The name is an alteration of the French name "Jean", just like the name Sjang that also can be heard in Limburg.

The male inhabitants from Maastricht are sometimes referred to as Sjengen (plural of Sjeng), by themselves as well as by people from Limburg outside the city of Maastricht. The Maastricht dialect is sometimes jokingly referred to as Sjengs.

== Notable people with the name Sjeng ==
- Sjeng Kraft: father of a female singer, well known in and around Maastricht: Beppie Kraft. He himself was known as an accordionist and a writer of carnival songs;
- Johan "Sjeng" Kremers: the Queen's Commissioner of the Dutch province of Limburg from 1977 to 1990;
- Sjeng Schalken: a former professional tennis player from the Netherlands, born in Weert;
- Sjeng Tans, the founder of the Maastricht University and the university's first president.

== Other uses ==
- "Sjeng aon de geng" ('Sjeng at work'), a song written in the Maastricht dialect by Frans Theunisz, singer of the band the "Nachraove". The song is played often during carnival in Maastricht and even become known throughout the rest of the country in 1995.
- Sjeng & the Gang, a band from the little town of Roggel.
- SjengGPT, the small language model out of Maastricht
