= Theo van Els =

Dutch university professor (1936–2015)

Theodorus Johannes Maria "Theo" van Els (14 May 1936 – 4 August 2015) was a Dutch academic who served as Rector magnificus of the Radboud University Nijmegen between 1994 and 2000. He was a professor of applied linguistics.

Van Els was born in 1936 in Wanssum, he obtained a degree in English language and literature at the Radboud University Nijmegen in 1961. In 1972, he obtained a PhD at the same university with a dissertation on an 8th-century manuscript of Old English names. In 1979, he became lecturer and two years later professor of applied linguistics.
