= Veulen =

Village in Limburg, Netherlands

- Village
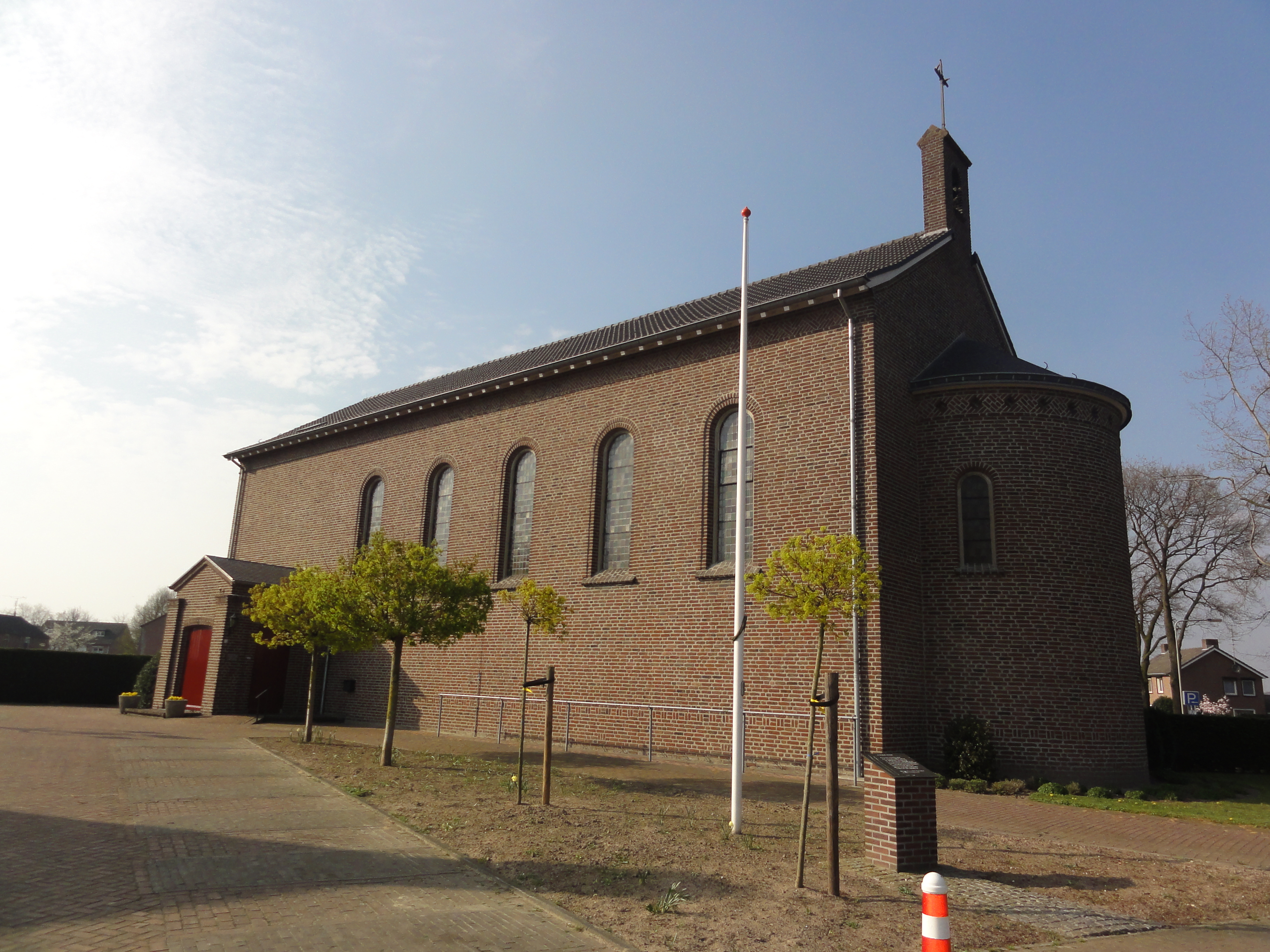
- Church of Veulen

- Location in the Netherlands Location in the province of Limburg in the Netherlands
- Coordinates: 51°29′N 5°57′E
- Country: Netherlands
- Province: Limburg
- Municipality: Venray

Area
  - Total: 10.29 km^{2} (3.97 sq mi)
- Elevation: 29 m (95 ft)

Population (2021)
  - Total: 555
  - Density: 53.9/km^{2} (140/sq mi)
- Time zone: UTC+1 (CET)
  - Summer (DST): UTC+2 (CEST)
- Postal code: 5814
- Dialing code: 0478

Veulen (Limburgs: 't Väöle) is a village in the municipality of Venray in Limburg, Netherlands.

The village was first mentioned in 1590 as Vairloe, and probably means "open forest located in front". Even though the current name translates to calf, there is no relation.

== Gallery ==
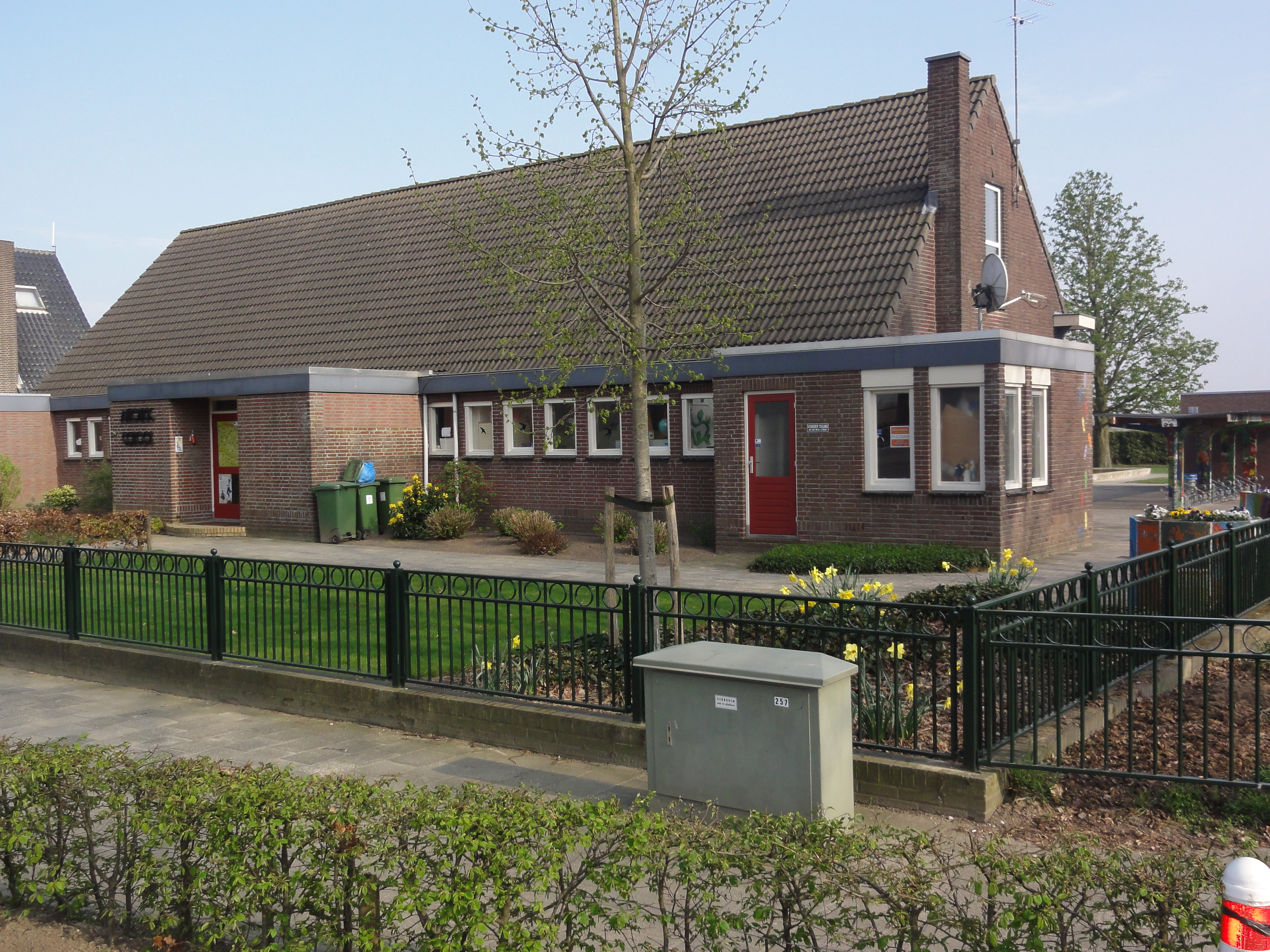
School in Veulen

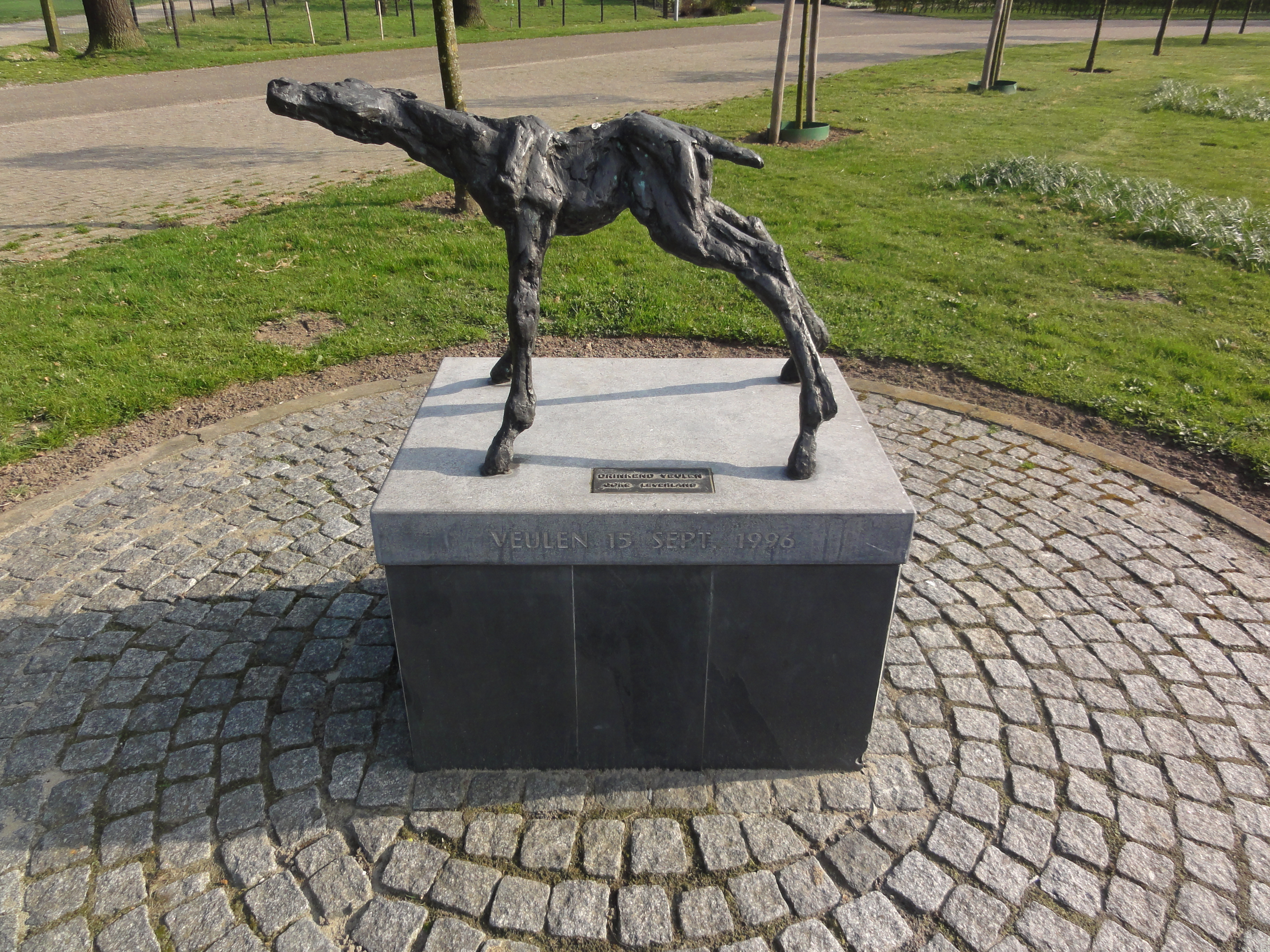
Drinking calf statue
