= Louis Sévèke =

Dutch left-wing activist (1964–2005)

Louis Sévèke

Jean Louis Bernhard Sévèke (Venray, 28 April 1964 – Nijmegen, 15 November 2005) was a Dutch radical left activist, journalist and writer. He was known for his legal action against the Police and the Dutch intelligence service. He was murdered by former comrade Marcel Teunissen in 2005.

== Life ==
Sévèke lived in Nijmegen from 1984, and later stopped his studies to become a full-time activist, involved in several squatting movements. He lived at the Grote Broek. In 1990 he authored a book about Dutch intelligence, called De tragiek van een geheime dienst ('The tragedy of a secret service'), and wrote for publications including Buro Jansen & Janssen, NRC Handelsblad and Vrij Nederland. He used his knowledge of security services and law to sue government agencies, and set up an organisation called Werkgroep Klachten Politieoptreden (Workgroup for complaints against acts of the police) that denounced police and judicial actions.

== Death ==
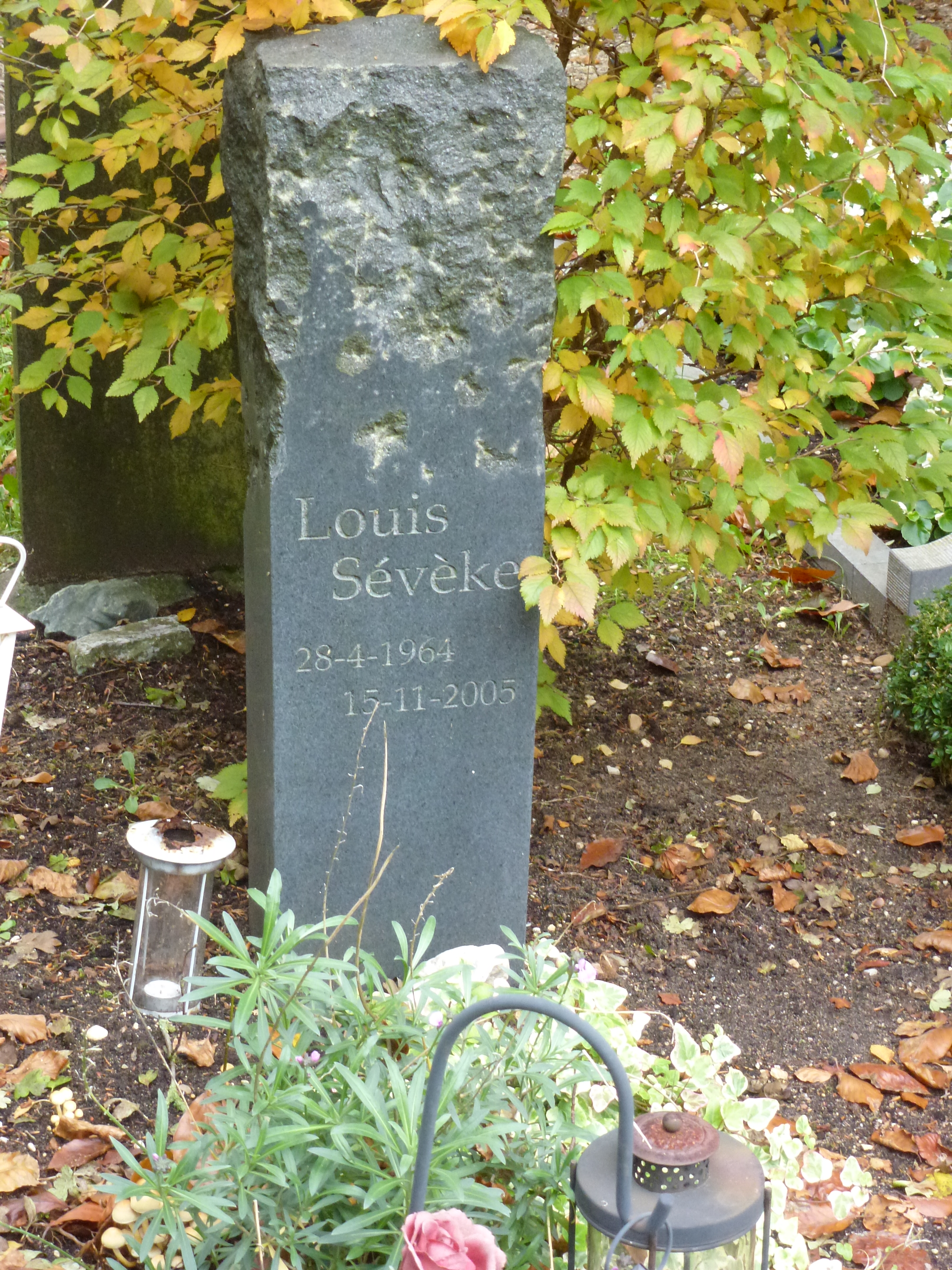
Grave of Louis Sévèke

Sévèke was shot dead, aged 41, in the city centre of Nijmegen on 15 November 2005. Family and friends were baffled as to the identity of the murderer. Since that time rumours of involvement of police or secret services have abounded. A year after the murder the police seemed to have made little headway. It has been suggested that the Dutch secret service (AIVD) had a 24/7 surveillance on Sévèke at the time of his murder; however, there were no signs of information coming from the secret service to the police.

== Teunissen ==
On 28 March 2007 the public prosecutor on the case revealed that a 38-year-old man named Marcel Teunissen (born 9 August 1968 in Nijmegen) from Rotterdam according to the Spanish police, had confessed to the murder. The murderer and victim knew each other from the squatting movement. The following day, it was revealed that revenge might have been the motive for the murder. Some people suggest that Sévèke suspected Teunissen to be an informant of the intelligence agency, and Teunissen had "sworn revenge" in his diary for being removed from the squatting scene because of that suspicion. Sévèke's family denies that Teunissen was removed from the scene but instead went away himself as a result of a discussion on taking money from houseowners for leaving. It was also suggested that the two men were linked since Sévèke had earlier helped Teunissen escape from prison.

Teunissen was convicted of the murder of Sévèke in March 2008, and was sentenced to full life imprisonment.
