= Venray =

Venray Venroj
- Municipality
- Venray city centre

- Flag Coat of arms

- Location in Limburg
- Coordinates: 51°32′N 5°59′E
- Country: Netherlands
- Province: Limburg

Government
  - Body: Municipal council
  - Mayor: Michiel Uitdehaag (D66)

Area
  - Total: 165.00 km^{2} (63.71 sq mi)
  - Land: 163.27 km^{2} (63.04 sq mi)
  - Water: 1.73 km^{2} (0.67 sq mi)
- Elevation: 25 m (82 ft)

Population (January 2021)
  - Total: 43,713
  - Density: 268/km^{2} (690/sq mi)
- Demonym(s): Venrayenaar, Venrayer
- Time zone: UTC+1 (CET)
  - Summer (DST): UTC+2 (CEST)
- Postcode: 5800–5817
- Area code: 0478
- Website: www.venray.nl

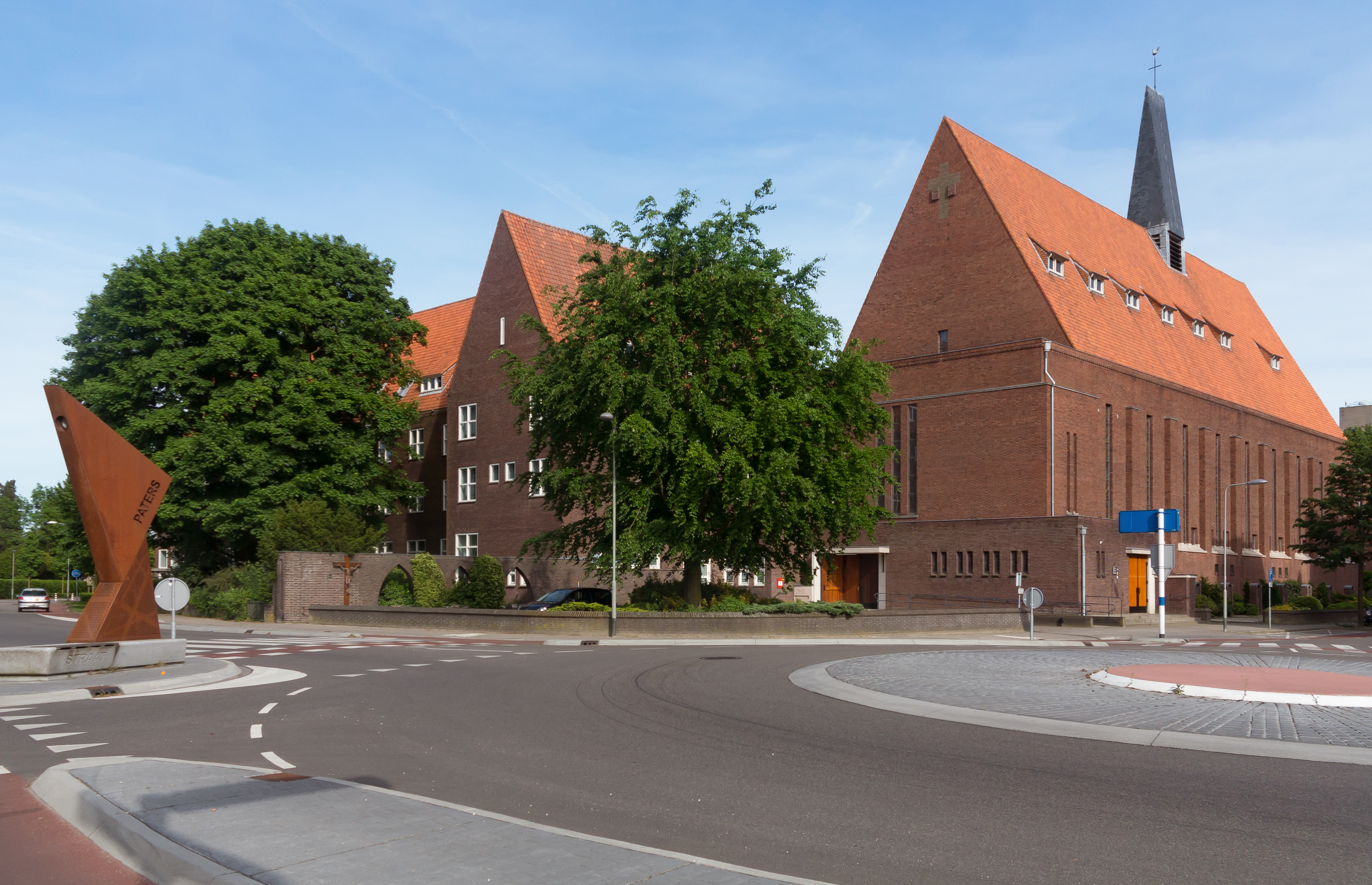
Church: de Onze Lieve Vrouw van Zeven Smarten of Paterskerk

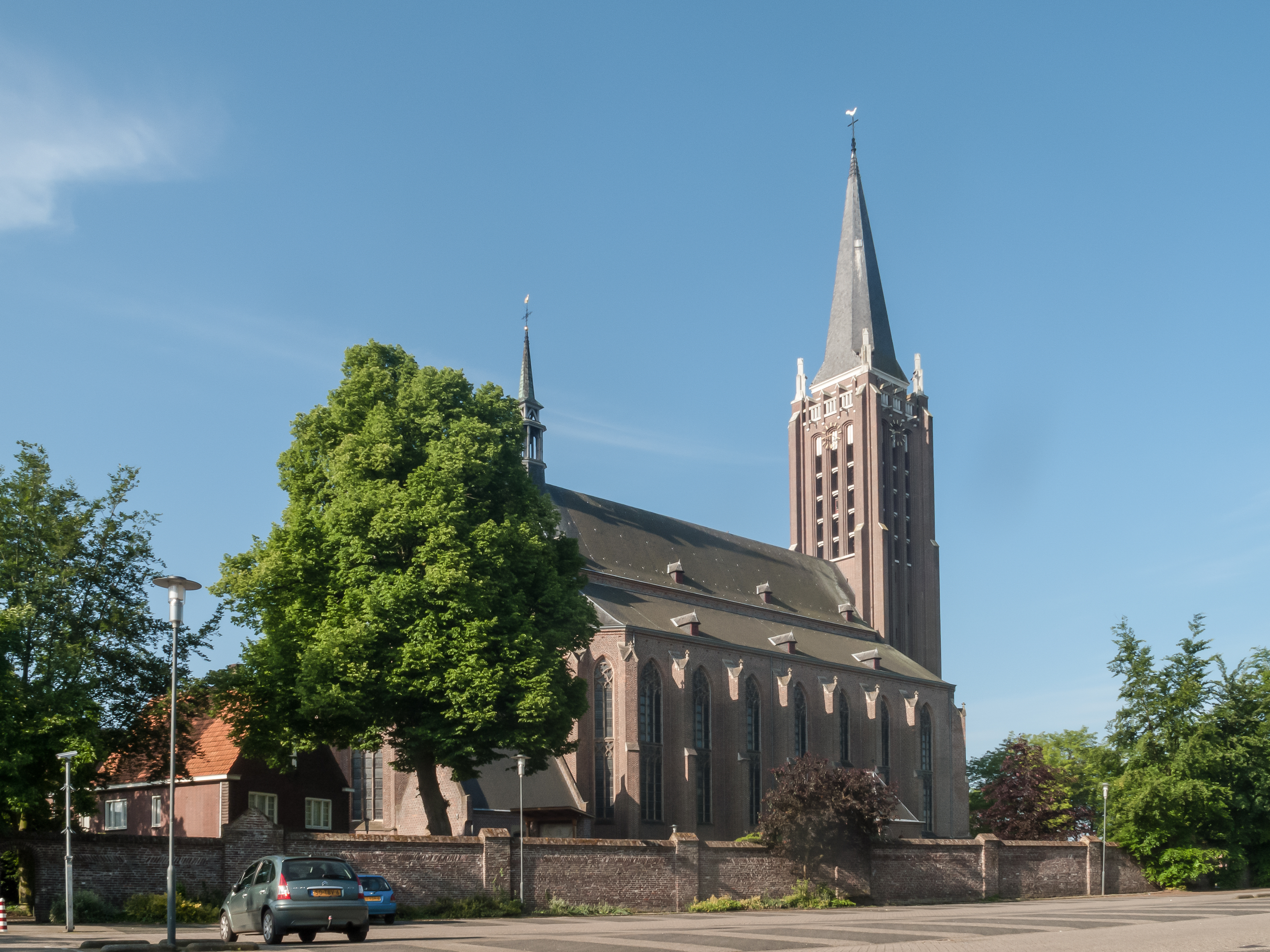
Church: de Sint Petrus Bandenkerk

Venray or Venraij (pronounced [ʋɛnˈraːi]; Limburgish: Venroj) is a municipality and a city in Limburg, the Netherlands.

The municipality of Venray consists of 14 towns over an area of 165 km^{2} (64 sq mi), with 43,494 inhabitants as of July 2016. About 30,000 of those inhabitants live in the city of Venray; the other 13,000 live in one of the 13 surrounding towns.

== Populated places ==
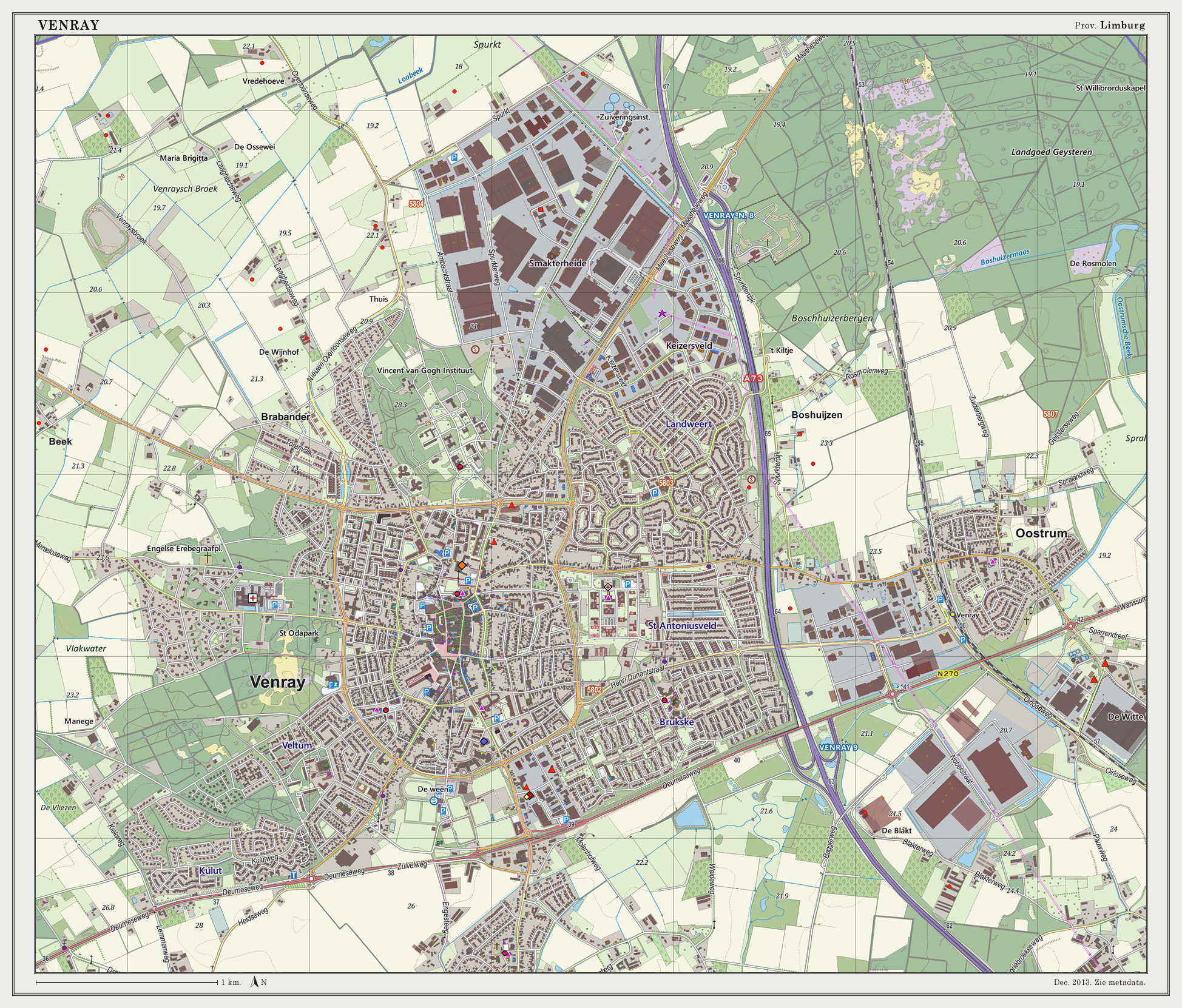
Map of Venray (town), Dec. 2013

- Beek - hamlet
- Blitterswijck - village
- Castenray - village
- Geijsteren
- Heide - village
- Leunen
- Merselo
- Oirlo
- Oostrum
- Smakt
- Venray - town
- Veulen - village
- Vredepeel - village with military base
- Wanssum - village
- Ysselsteyn - village

== Mental hospitals ==
In 1905, the Sint Servatius mental hospital for men was built by the Brothers of Charity. The first patients arrived in 1907. In 1906, the Sint Anna mental hospital for women was built by the Sisters of Charity of Jesus and Mary. The first patients arrived in 1909. In 1969, management of the mental hospitals was transferred to two separate foundations. Both mental hospitals have a continuing impact on Venray from cultural, religious and employment perspectives. Nowadays, both mental hospitals are managed by GGZ Noord- en Midden-Limburg.

Venray also hosts one of 12 mental hospitals in the Netherlands, De Rooyse Wissel, that houses people assigned to mental treatment as a court measure.

== St. Peter in Chains Church ==
The St. Peter ad Vincula church in Venray hosts one of the largest late medieval collections of wooden sculptures that survived the iconoclasm of the protestant reformation in the Netherlands. The church itself was originally built in the 15th century in the gothic style. It was rebuilt after extensive damage following the World War II Battle of Overloon.

== World War II ==
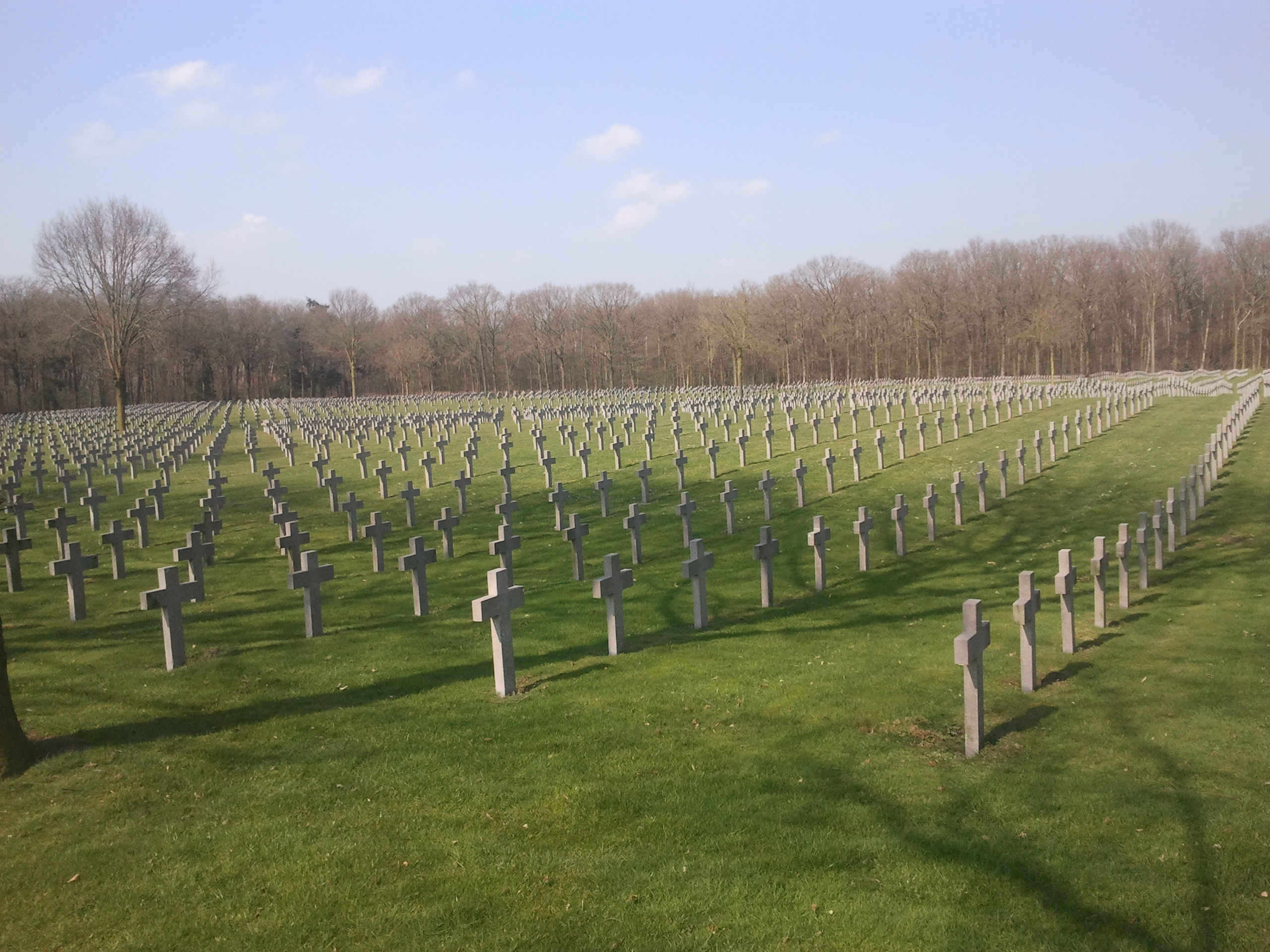
German war cemetery

Towards the end of World War II there were several battles in and around Venray, damaging large parts of the center of Venray. These include the Battle of Overloon from 30 September to 18 October 1944, one of the largest tank battles between the Germans and western Allies. Venray town was not liberated until 1945. It has the only German War Cemetery in the Netherlands. 31,598 German soldiers are buried here.

== Economy ==
- Flextronics: Venray hosts manufacturing units and logistics centers for Flextronics
- Herbalife: Venray hosts a European logistics center for Herbalife.
- ModusLink: Venray hosts a major supply chain location for ModusLink
- OTTO Work Force: Venray hosts the head-office for OTTO Work Force, a temp agency that predominantly provides Polish expatriate workers.
- Xerox: Venray hosts a manufacturing plant and European logistics center for Rank Xerox, later Xerox. Nowadays, the European logistics center and a Toner and Photoconductor plant remain. In the 1990s Xerox outsourced manufacturing of copier and printers to Flextronics.
- Royal Netherlands Air Force: Venray houses De Peel Air Base.

In recent decades Venray has made a transition from manufacturing to a third-party logistics base. As a consequence many warehouses have been built on industrial estates in recent years.

Small and medium enterprises and mental healthcare also continue to play an important role in the local economy. Venray also provides logistics through its Meuse river harbor in Wanssum and A73 motorway.

== Nature ==
The western section of Venray, the villages Vredepeel and Ysselsteyn, was reclaimed from the Peel peat bogs in the early 20th century. Parts of the peat bogs remain and have been transferred to a national park. The western section of Venray is also straddled by part of the Peel-Raam Line, defensive works consisting of a canal and bunkers dating to the World War II period.

Venray, near Geijsteren, also has a forest and sand dune area, that is one of the few locations in the Netherlands that is home to common juniper.

== Notable residents ==
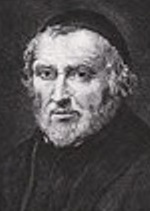
Godefrid Henschen, 1680

- Rutgerus Sycamber (late 15th century) humanist, canon regular of the Order of St. Augustine
- Godfrey Henschen (1601–1681) a Belgian Jesuit hagiographer, one of the first Bollandists
- Harry Peeters (1931–2012), a historian, psychologist and academic
- Theo van Els (1936–2015) a professor of applied linguistics
- Louis Sévèke (1964–2005) a Dutch radical left activist, journalist, writer and murder victim
- Michelle Courtens (born 1981), a singer
- Koen Heldens (born 1986), mixing engineer

=== Sport ===
- Peter Winnen (born 1957), a cyclist, winner of Alpe d'Huez
- Edward Linskens (born 1968), a football player
- Leopold van Asten (born 1976) a Dutch show jumping equestrian, participated at the 2004 Summer Olympics
- Mark Veens (born 1978), a freestyle swimmer
- Joey Hanssen (born 1991), a racing driver
- Mike Teunissen (born 1992) a Dutch racing cyclist
- Pauliena Rooijakkers (born 1993) a road cyclist

== See also ==
- Battle of Venray
- Venray sheep companies
