= Beek, Venray =

Beek
- Hamlet
- Location in the Netherlands Location in the province of Limburg in the Netherlands
- Coordinates: 51°32′12″N 5°56′35″E
- Country: Netherlands
- Province: Limburg
- Municipality: Venray
- Time zone: UTC+1 (CET)
  - Summer (DST): UTC+2 (CEST)
- Postal code: 5815
- Dialing code: 0478

Beek is a hamlet in the Dutch province of Limburg. It is located in the municipality Venray, about 3 km northwest of the center of that town.

Beek is not a statistical entity, and the postal authorities have placed it under Merselo. It has no place name signs, and consists of about 25 houses.
