= Johan Kremers =

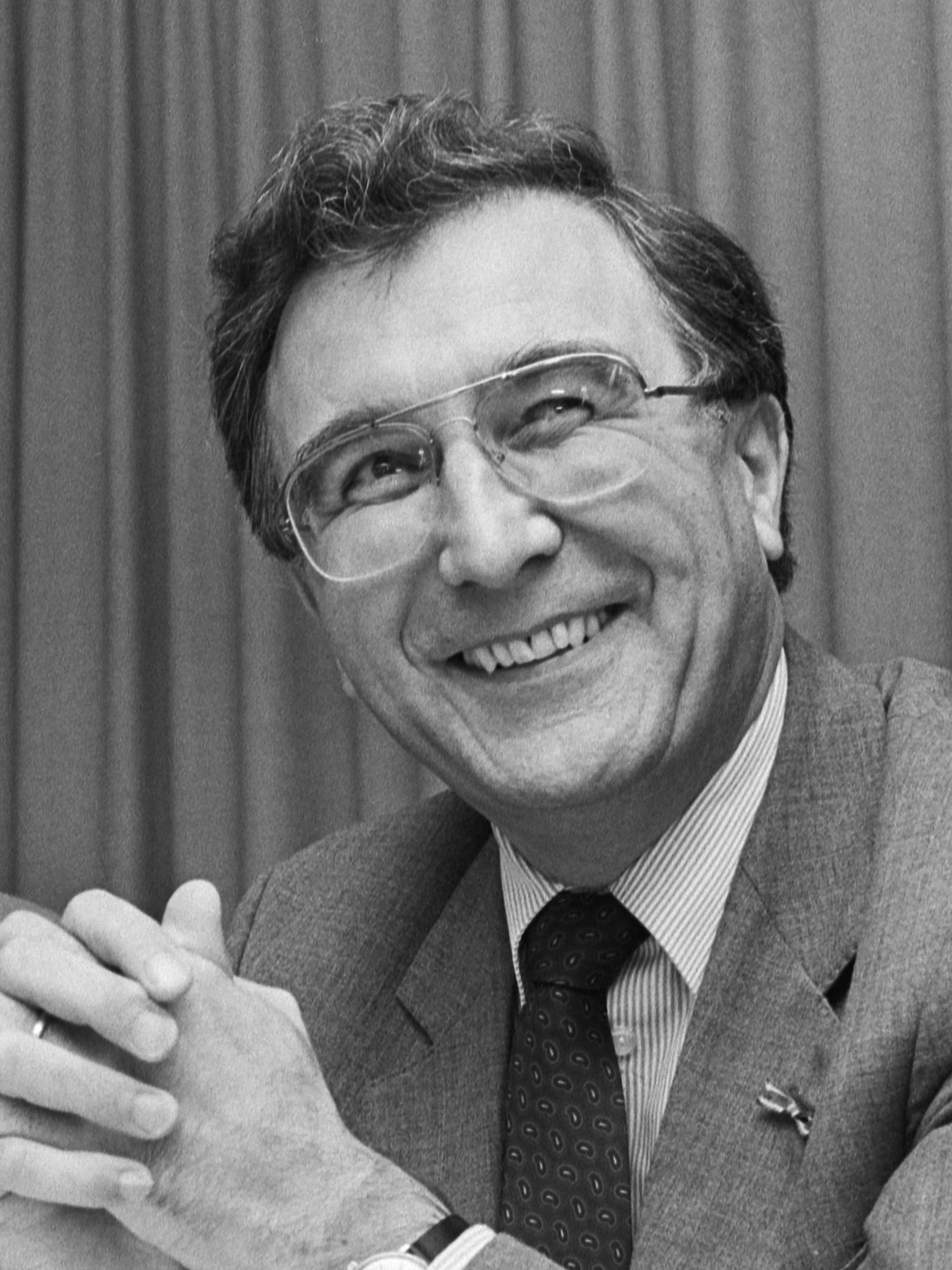
Johan Kremers (1981)

Dr. Johan (Sjeng) Kremers (born 10 May 1933) was the Queen's Commissioner of the Dutch province of Limburg from 1977 to 1990.

== Early life ==
Kremers was born in Nieuwenhagen, a village in the province of Limburg, in the very south of the Netherlands. His father was a miner who worked 37 years underground in the Laura mine in Eygelshoven.

From 1951 to 1957 he studied psychology at the Catholic University of Nijmegen (presently known as the Radboud University Nijmegen). In 1960 he obtained his doctorate in social sciences at the Nijmegen University. He was a scientific research worker at the psychological laboratory of the University of California at Berkeley in the United States from 1960 up to 1961. From 1961 until 1972 he worked at the Catholic University of Nijmegen.

In 1972 Dr. Kremers became a member of the Wetenschappelijke Raad voor het Regeringsbeleid, an independent think tank for the Dutch government.

== Queen's Commissioner of the province of Limburg ==
On August 1, 1977, Dr. Kremers was appointed as Queen's Commissioner of the Dutch province of Limburg. The province of Limburg was in turmoil then, because of the government-initiated mine closures.

Unemployment within the province was extremely high, because many miners had been dismissed, but also because of the deteriorating (inter)national economic situation. In 1977 unemployment within the province of Limburg was twice as high as in the Netherlands as a whole.

As Queen's Commissioner Dr. Kremers conducted an active economic policy to reduce the effects of the mine closures and to push back unemployment.

The economic restructuring policy for the province of Limburg was aimed at:

- the creation of alternative employment within the already existing chemical factories of the mines.
- the stimulation of new industries.
- the relocation of a number of large government services form the seat of the government in The Hague to the province of Limburg.

In 1975 the provincial government commissioned an independent company, the Industriebank LIOF to support existing employment and attract alternative employment. Since 1975 this organization has brought over 100 companies to the province of Limburg.

In 1982 the provincial government drew up a plan to stimulate tourism in South Limburg. The plan was aimed at four specific fields: conference tourism, holiday tourism, water sports and recreational facilities for a day trip. Conference tourism was given a considerable boost with the building of the Maastricht Exhibition and Congress Centre (MECC).

On May 16, 1990, Dr. Kremers resigned as Queen's Commissioner. The economy of the province of Limburg, although still weak, is in line with the national economy. Because of the successful economic policies Dr. Kremers is affectionately known in the province of Limburg as "Der Sjeng".

== Later life ==
After his resignation as Queen's Commissioner Dr. Kremers became vice-chairman of the Robeco Group, a Dutch portfolio company. He retired in December 1997.

== See also ==
- Queen's Commissioner
