= Wanssum =

- Village
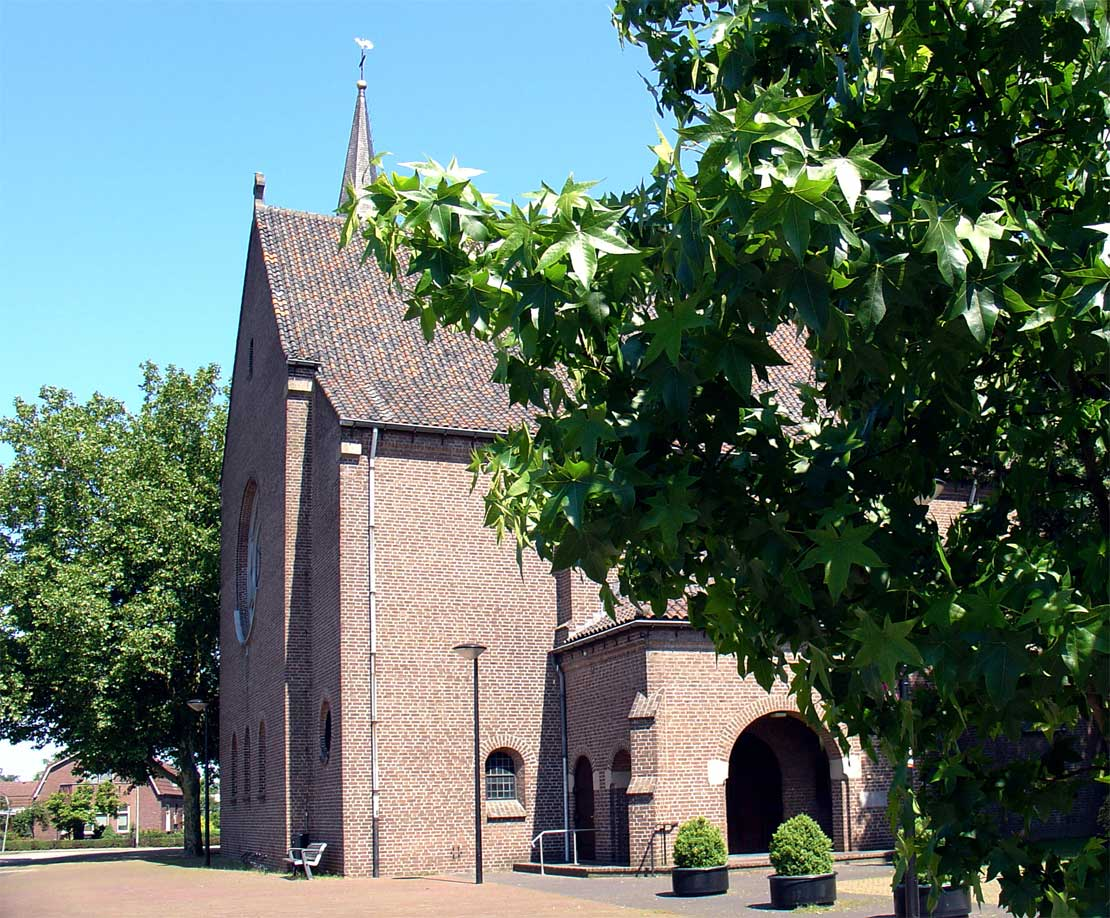
- Sint Michaëlskerk Wanssum

- Coat of arms

- Location in the Netherlands Location in the province of Limburg in the Netherlands
- Coordinates: 51°32′9″N 6°4′31″E
- Country: Netherlands
- Province: Limburg
- Municipality: Venray

Area
  - Total: 7.07 km^{2} (2.73 sq mi)
- Elevation: 16 m (52 ft)

Population (2021)
  - Total: 1,875
  - Density: 265/km^{2} (687/sq mi)
- Time zone: UTC+1 (CET)
  - Summer (DST): UTC+2 (CEST)
- Postal code: 5861
- Dialing code: 0478

Wanssum is a village in the Dutch province of Limburg. It is located in the municipality of Venray.

== History ==
The village was first mentioned in 1242 as Wanzem, and means "settlement of Wando or Wanso (person)". Wanssum developed at the confluence of the Grote Molenbeek with the maas. In 1485, it became an independent parish. In 1648, it became part of Spanish Guelders. In 1713, it was part of Prussia, and in 1815, it became part of the Kingdom of the Netherlands.

The St Michaels Church is a three aisled church built between 1950 and 1951 to replace the church which was destroyed in 1944.

Wanssum was home to 460 people in 1840. Most of the village was destroyed by war in 1944, and later rebuilt. Wanssum was a separate municipality until 1969, when it merged with Meerlo. In 2010, it became part of the municipality of Venray.
