= Venray sheep companies =

The Venray sheep companies were a group of Dutch livestock merchant companies who dominated the European trade in sheep in the 19th century.

== Background ==
With an area of almost 150 square kilometres, Venray, a municipality in the north of Limburg, is one of the largest municipalities in the Netherlands. More than half of the land used to be part of the Peel, an area of vital importance for the local farmers. The presence of wide areas of moorland led to the development of sheep farming and related cottage industries, such as the production of yarn, cloth and hats. Sheep produced an average of 2,5 kilograms of wool each per annum, and were therefore a welcome source of secondary income, quite apart from the droppings that they left on the land. At that time sheep were not reared for their meat.

However, the French soldiers who were stationed in Venray from 1794 to 1814 were enthusiastic mutton eaters, and this gave the farmers cause to take another look at the economic value of their animals.

== Foundation of the Venray sheep companies ==
Around 1809 some of the sheep farmers had the idea of driving their sheep to Paris, at that time the capital city of the empire to which they belonged, and offering them for sale. When it became known that this trade was profitable, others soon followed in the pioneers' footsteps. Five farmers pooled their interests and founded a partnership, "De Grote Compagnie" (The big company), which set up an organized trade route between Venray and Paris, with fixed staging posts along the way.

The drive on foot to the markets of Paris took two weeks on average, and ran south of the Peel to Antwerp, and then through the lush pastures along the Schelde to northern France. The herds were collected together in the border village of Warcoing before undertaking the last stage of their journey to Paris.

== Expansion of the Venray sheep companies ==
Initially the partners only drove their own sheep, but within a few years there was a network of buyers in The Netherlands, and Venray became the focus of a trade which saw tens of thousands of sheep being sent to France each year, not only by "De Grote Compagnie", but also by five smaller enterprises.

Under the Raets, Poels, Camps, Trynes and Vorstermans families the business flourished to such a degree that in 1845 a second outlet market, London, was opened up, to which the sheep were transported from ports such as Harlingen, Medemblik, Rotterdam, and Vlissingen.

Dutch sheep farmers were meanwhile unable to cope with the demand, so that ever increasing numbers of German sheep were being bought, and when even this source proved inadequate, representatives of the company travelled to the Ukraine, Denmark and Iceland in circa 1875, and in 1891 a trading office was opened in Buenos Aires, which arranged for the transport of not just live sheep, but also deep-frozen meat to Europe. At the beginning of the 20th century, the meat trade in the slaughterhouses of Paris, London and Antwerp was dominated by Venray businesses, and until the outbreak of World War II they were the most important producers of bacon and tinned ham in Poland, Hungary, and Canada.

Although the smaller sheep companies folded one by one after 1900, "De Grote Compagnie" remained in existence until 1951, when representatives of the eleven participating families from a number of different countries held their final annual gathering in the high-class Swan Hotel in Venray, at the card table of which, 150 years earlier, their joint company had been founded. In the intervening time this initiative had given rise to a host of independent companies. At this gathering the final collective bank balance, a sum of 5,000 guilders, was presented to the parochial church of Venray to finance a new choir stall, which since then serves as a reminder of a unique example of Limburg enterprise. History
