= New Zealand Superstock Championship =

Dirt track racing event

- Category: Superstocks
- Country: New Zealand
- Inaugural season: 1965/66 season
- Drivers: 131 (2024)
- Manufacturers: Ford, Nissan, Toyota, Chevrolet, BMW, Jaeger
- Drivers' champion: (New Zealand) Brad Uhlenberg 85V (2026)
- Official website: http://www.speedway.co.nz/CHAMPIONSHIPS/CHAMPIONSHIPS-1

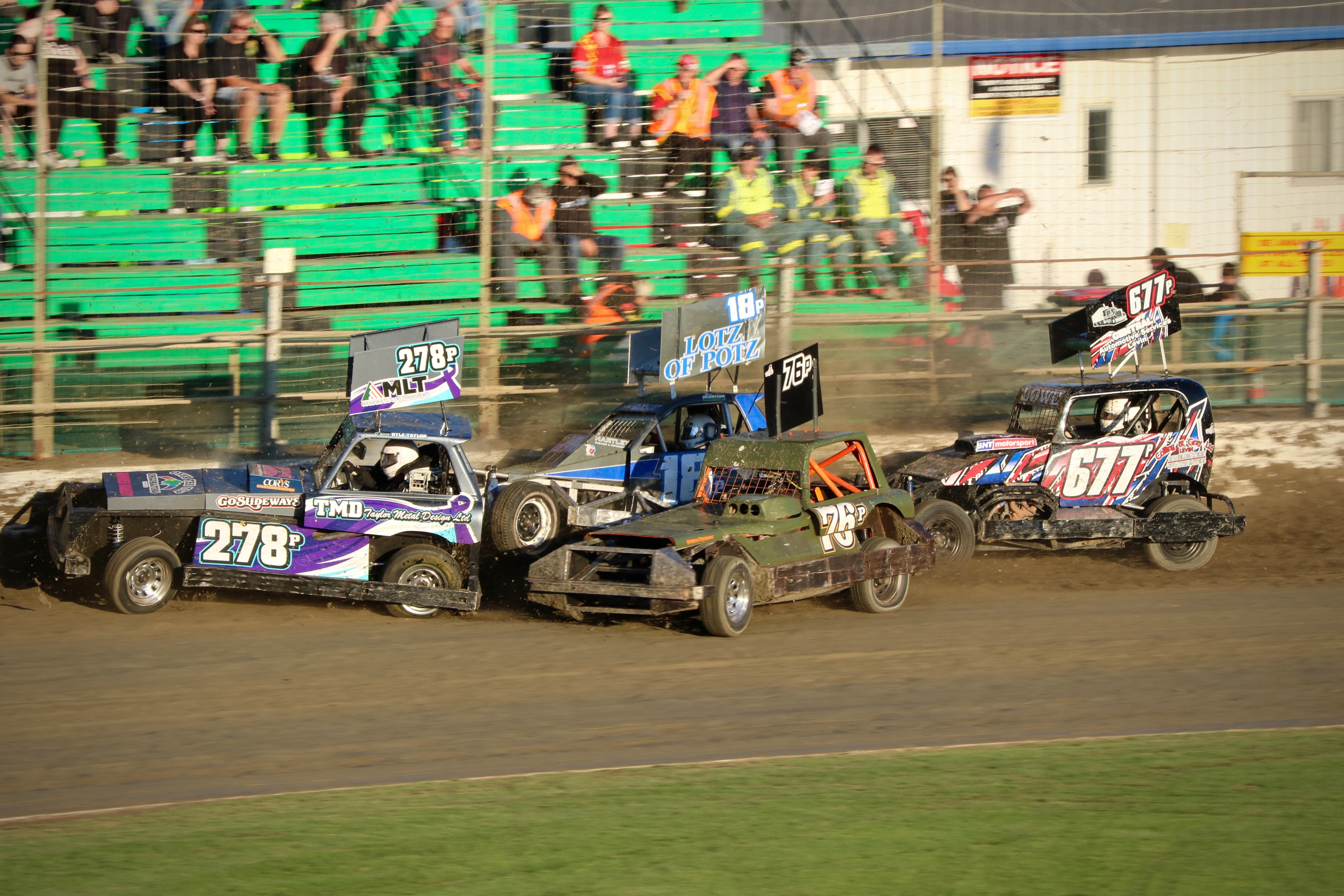
The often usual sight in NZ Superstock Racing

The New Zealand Superstock Championship is an annually contested national championship for superstocks on a rotating track schedule. The current champion is Brad Uhlenberg, registered to Oceanview Speedway, who won his first title at Wellington Speedway in January 2026.

Graham Stretch was the inaugural champion, winning the title at Palmerston North International Speedway in the 1965/66 season. Craig Boote, Kevin Free and Asher Rees have been the most successful winners, each winning 3 times. Asher Rees is the first to win 3 in a row

== Racing rules ==
Dirt track racing in New Zealand comes in many different forms such as sprintcars, sidecars, late model and many others, but the most popular is Superstocks racing. Superstocks racing allows for full contact, hardcore racing around oval dirt tracks with concrete walls in close proximity to the outside of the track. Drivers are entitled to push one another into the infield, up the wall or into one another in the fight for victory. With no blue flags backmarker cars may wait for the lead pack and if drivers wish, may take out lead cars to best suit their track code, friends, family or teammates from the New Zealand Superstock Teams Championship.

== Engines ==
Current Speedway New Zealand rules stipulate the engine must be no larger than 248 cubic inches, with most teams using V6 or V8 race engines. The estimated power output figure is around 500hp. Most cars tend to run:

- Toyota VVTI V8
- Nissan VK56 V8
- Nissan VH41 V8
- Ford V8
- Chevrolet V8

== Past champions ==
Season	Track	1st	2nd	3rd
2026	Wellington	Brad Uhlenberg 85V	Ethan Rees 127G	William Humphries 94P
2025	Nelson	Todd Hemingway 99M	Ethan Levien 46W	Shane Harwood 18N
2024	Meeanee	Asher Rees 1NZK	Blair Uhlenberg 28S	Zane Dykstra 38V
2023	Huntly	Asher Rees 1NZK	Josh Prentice 5G	Ethan Rees 127G
2022	Not held due to COVID-19			
2021	Rotorua	Asher Rees 126K	Jason Long 41B	Mitch Vickery 26K
2020	Whanganui	Randal Tarrant 66B	Adam Joblin 62P	Scott Joblin 52P
2019	Woodford Glen	Jason Long 41B	Peter Rees 10G	Simon Joblin 72P
2018	Waikaraka Park	William Humphries 94P	Adam Joblin 3NZP	Jordan Dare 2NZP
2017	Central Energy Trust Arena	Simon Joblin 72P	Jordan Dare 581P	Adam Joblin 62P
2016	Stratford	Shane Harwood 18N	Jason Long 41B	Graeme Barr 3NZP
2015	Wellington	Peter Rees 10P	Peter Bengston 58P	Graeme Barr 3NZP
2014	Meeanee	Shane Penn 1NZP	Jordan Dare 581P	Graeme Barr 32P
2013	Nelson	Shane Penn 3NZP	Dale McKenzie 85N	Thomas Stanaway 87N
2012	Huntly	Joe Faram 4B	Kerry Humphrey 79P	Shane Penn 7P
2011	Rotorua	Dale Ewers 14N	Scott Joblin 52P	Peter Rees 10P
2010	Kihikihi	Brendan Higgins 3NZN	Bevan Humphries 54P	Murray Long 96B
2009	Woodford Glen	Malcolm Ngatai 19C	Dale Ewers 14N	Brendan Higgins 79N
2008	Whanganui	Kyle Fraser 92R	Wayne Hemi 591P	Darryl Taylor 5V
2007	Dunedin	Simon Joblin 72P	Peter Rees 10P	Shane Penn 77P
2006	Waikaraka Park	Darcy Hunter 337R	Wayne Hemi 591P	Mark Osborne 16C
2005	Central Energy Trust Arena	Bryce Penn 121P	Rodney Wood 51M	Brendan Rowlands 37B
2004	Nelson	Kelvin Gray 46P	Wayne Hemi 591P	Geoff James 81M
2003	Stratford	Jared Wade 85H	Shane Penn 77B	Stan Hickey 515R
2002	Gisborne	Wayne Hemi 59W	Ross Thurston 6P	Neil McCoard 4R
2001	Meeanee	Murray Hobbs 94R	Barry Podjurskey 69P	Roydon Collingwood 7S
2000	Blenheim	Craig Boote 1NZN	Joe Faram 58R	Stan Hickey 515R/Tony McLanachan 5W
1999	Huntly	Craig Boote 7N	Brendan Rowlands 37S	Rodney Wood 51R
1998	Rotorua	Craig Pierce 116A	Roydon Collingwood 7S	Darren Gray 15W
1997	Woodford Glen	Craig Boote 7N	Tony McLanachan 5W	Chris Uhlenberg 76S
1996	Wellington	Kim Lace 71W	Ian King 84W	Darren Gray 15W
1995	Whanganui	Lyall Rumney 72R	Mike Johnston 78V	Roydon Collingwood 7S
1994	Invercargill	Barry Podjursky 69S	Neville Stanaway 1R	Rex Nield 88R
1993	Waikaraka Park	Kevin Free 36H	Craig Pierce 66M	Mark Decke 99M
1992	Central Energy Trust Arena	Barry Podjursky 69S	Graeme Gaskin 52w	Lyall Rumney 72r
1991	Nelson	Gary Parkes 4P	Barry Podjursky 69S	Bryce Penn 1B
1990	Stratford	Barry Hunter 38R	Dave Evans 6P	John Booker 25S
1989	Gisborne	Dave Tennant 75A	Frank Van Vroonhoven 24H	Kevin Free 36H
1988	Meeanee	Paul Wade 85HR	Bryce Penn 1B	Tony Warner 27B
1987	Blenheim	Bruce Simpson 7S	Graeme Barr 38S	Brian McPhee 5W
1986	Baypark	Russell Joblin 8S	Keith Simpson 13S	Bob Smith 53V
1985	Rotorua	Dave Evans 3P	Paul Grant 51P	Russell Joblin 8S
1984	Woodford Glen	Dave Evans 3P	Brian Musgrove 1W	Brian Anderson 1P
1983	Wellington	Gary Parkes 4P	Bryce Penn 61B	Barry Lane 7P
1982	Whanganui	Charlie Bernsten 432V	Tony Warner 27B	Bob Smith 53V
1981	Nelson	Warren McIntyre 1P	Peter Broughan 2P	Peter Wackildene 94p
1980	Waikaraka Park	Frank Irvine 10A	Garry Harris 16A	Craig Taylor 51M
1979	Central Energy Trust Arena	Keith Turner 16V	Barry Featherstone 99H	Ian Glenny 35B
1978	Stratford	Graham Mitchell 10A	Barry Featherstone 99H	Graham Smith 8H
1977	Gisborne	Lindsay Willis 14R	Barry Featherstone 99H	Joel Wright 6A/Perry Keyte 2H
1976	Hamilton	Kevin Free 61A	Joel Wright 7A	Barry Featherstone 99H
1975	Meeanee	Tony Warner 27B/Ray Morrow 29M		Graham Mitchell 10A
1974	Rotorua	Adrian Kaye 37R	John Hanright 2P/Peter Hetterley 32P	
1973	Wellington	Albert Gordge 95S	Gil Mallia 83W	Ian Taylor 21W
1972	Waikaraka Park	Phil Joyce 1A	Graham Mitchell 10A	Graeme McLachlan 2A/Colin Weller 7A
1971	Central Energy Trust Arena	Gary Scott 6S	Tony Baker 4R	Albert Gordge 95S
1970	Hamilton	Kevin Free 61H	Albert Gordge 95S	Conway Taylor 14H
1969	Stratford	George Wharehoka 42R	Kel Fapieta 41R	Alan Jago 36S
1968	Meeanee	Mike Weymss 27B	Dave Hooper 22P	Bill Prebensen 7B
1967	Central Energy Trust Arena	Gus Gapes 14P	Dave Hooper 22P	Graeme Handisides 6P
1966	Central Energy Trust Arena	Graham Stretch 3P	Alan Sperling 29P	Alan Pryce 17P
