= Auckland Stadiums =

Auckland Stadiums is a division of Auckland Unlimited (formerly Regional Facilities Auckland), a unit of Auckland Council in New Zealand that manages Auckland's regional stadiums. Auckland Stadiums manages, operates and promotes Mount Smart Stadium, QBE (North Harbour) Stadium, and Western Springs Stadium.
