= Western Springs Bowl =

Stadium in Auckland, New Zealand

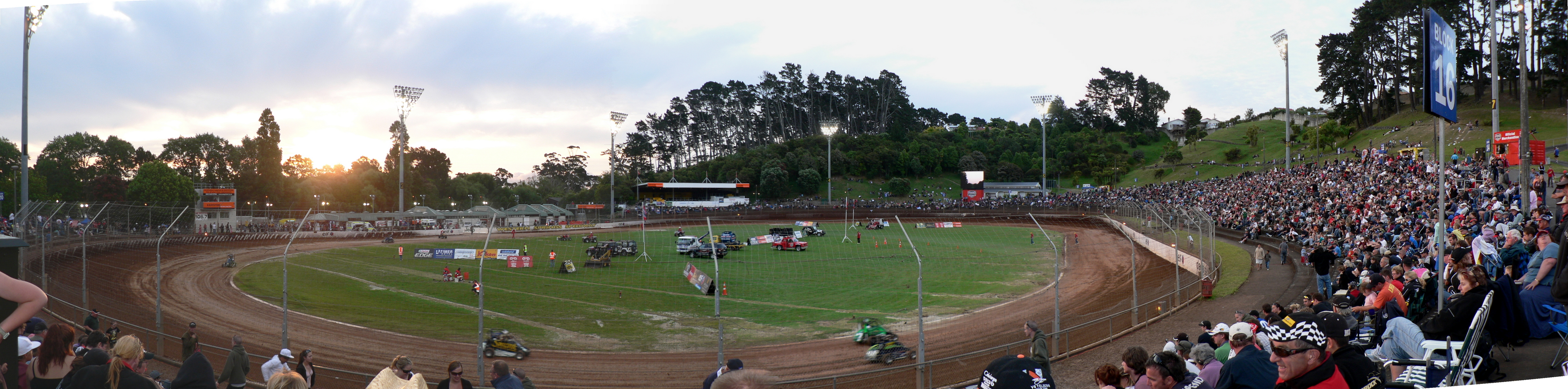
- Interactive map of Western Springs Bowl
- Location: Stadium Rd, Western Springs, Auckland, New Zealand
- Coordinates: 36°51′55″S 174°43′34″E
- Owner: Auckland Unlimited, Auckland Council (indirectly through Auckland Unlimited)
- Operator: Auckland Stadiums (division of Auckland Unlimited)
- Capacity: Concerts: 15,000 - 30,000; Sports: 5,000

Tenant
- Ponsonby RFC

Western Springs Bowl (formerly known as Western Springs Stadium) is a stadium in Auckland, New Zealand. Built within a natural amphitheatre, it is primarily used for rugby union matches during the winter and for speedway racing during the summer. It is also occasionally used for large concerts and festivals.

Western Springs Bowl primarily hosts concerts and festivals with a crowd capacity of 15,000 to 30,000, with sporting events of up to 5,000. It is located four kilometres (2.5 mi) west of the city centre in the suburb of Western Springs.

== History ==
Western Springs Stadium was built on land purchased from the Motion family by Auckland City Council in 1875 in order to build the Western Springs reservoir and pump station. Situated in a natural amphitheatre, concrete terracing was constructed. It was designed and modelled on European stadiums which included a banked concrete cycling track, a cinder running track, and a grassed centre area for football and sports. The original design included a covered grandstand which would fill the gap between the concrete terraces, the cycling track finishing straight was designed and built to start and finish in front of the proposed grandstand (where the pit area now is). The stadium was never completed.

In 1929, the stadium built by Relief Labour was opened to serve cycling, athletics and football sports. The cycling track was over 500 yards in circumference as the European tracks were then. The cinder all weather Athletic 440-yard running track was the first of its type in NZ and it with the overall stadium would have easily compared to the famous Wembley Stadium in England. Some conjecture has been made when motorcycle speedway commenced on Western Springs. Saroway Park Newmarket was being used at the time. Previously, the Mt. Albert volcanic crater had been used. It was not until 1935 Motorcycle broadsiding commenced on the cinder running track (as they did on Wembley). On Christmas Day December 1937 midget car racing was introduced at a special international meeting, it included NZ pioneers Ron Roycroft and Geo Smith. The first official season then followed in January 1938. Speedway was still being raced at the previous venue at the Epsom Showgrounds. Athletics disappeared from Western Springs as a result and New Zealand's only all weather Athletics track was replaced by the traditional grass tracks until the late 1960s. When the first of the new style all weather athletics tracks were built Western Springs was already many years ahead of its time with an all weather cinder surface laid in 1929.

The 1950s saw promoters "take over" with the blessing of the Auckland City Council pleased to receive a monetary return. The early promoters combined Cycling, Motorcycle Speedway and Speedway Cars who all raced together on the same programme with a large following. The war intervened and in 1944 Speedway became a huge entertainment and the formula of Cycling, Speedway Bikes and Midgets reached international heights.

Speedway previously had competed on Epsom Showgrounds, Blanford Park on the old cycling track around the soccer field (now under the Grafton Gully motorway) and Olympic Park (Saraway Park) in Newmarket.

Stock car promoters raised the height of the speedway/running track introducing stock cars and forcing speedway motorcycling out, who relocated to Rosebank Road. Speedway cars were affected at this time by a conflict with Stock Car promoters. During the 1960s, cycling was forced out of the stadium as the promoters in tandem with the Auckland City Council made access difficult and later impossible under the requirements of the speedway track. The Auckland City Council had little regard for Amateur sports such as Cycling and Athletics, nor for the stadium itself, never completing the complex and building the Grandstands. Neglect reached its nadir when the main concrete terraces slipped away during the 1960s, almost taking the cycling track with it. It took months to effect repairs; under strong public criticism they finally did some thing to re-instate the damaged terraces. The surrounding stadium grounds deteriorated into a Council yard with derelict equipment and buildings littering the boundary of the site which spread to the adjoining Lake and Pump House and abandoned relief campsite. Speedway Cars resurged into a new golden era when stock cars went to Gloucester Park and finally Waikaraka Park.

Because cycling was forced out, the cycling track was never able to be used again, so it was removed to widen the new speedway midget race track; at the same time, smaller cycling velodrome track sizes became the International requirement.

The 1960s saw a brief return of what the stadium concept originally was; this was assisted by the Speedway promoter who laid the athletic track. On the success of Peter Snells' Olympic victories an International Athletic and Cycling event was held with the largest crowd recorded for the stadium. It was larger than the 1950 British Empire Games cycling events and Closing Ceremony.

In February 2007, the WWE Road To Wrestlemania 23 Tour came to Western Spring attracting over 12,000 WWE fans.

In 2026 Western Springs Stadium was rebranded as Western Springs Bowl. A $2.5 million site redevelopment took place over four months from July to October 2026 to transform the traditional multi-use sports and speedway stadium into a dedicated outdoor music and festivals venue, and boutique sports arena outside the concert season.

== Speedway ==
Western Springs Stadium has been used for speedway since 30 November 1929 when motorcycling (broad siding) was introduced. Midget Car racing started in December 1937 with an International race including New Zealand pioneers Ron Roycroft and Geo Smith. The first full speedway season started in January 1938. With the war years, there was a break until 1944 when speedway with cycling, motor cycling and midget cars became the major entertainment event during the summer months in Auckland.

The site has hosted many significant events, including qualifying rounds of the Speedway World Championship and the New Zealand Solo Championship on 15 occasions from in 1931 to 1989.

On 31 March 2012, Western Springs Stadium played host to the opening round of the 2012 Speedway Grand Prix, the first time the Speedway Grand Prix (SGP) has ever been held in New Zealand. The 413 metres (452 yards) long track was one of the longest tracks ever used in the SGP series. The SGP of New Zealand was held in 2012, 2013 and 2014 before being cut from the 2015 Speedway Grand Prix series. The speedway announced that 2020/2021 season races are being streamed live on the internet to subscribers of United States–based FloRacing.

In 2024, the venue celebrated its 95th year of speedway but due to noise complaints and legal action from a local residents group, speedway events have been limited to 12 per season.

On 22 March 2025, Western Springs Speedway hosted its final speedway meeting. The Auckland council made the decision to move all speedway in the stadium to Waikaraka Park, and to renovate Western Springs Stadium. Michael Pickens won the final midget race at the Springs, a 96 lap feature event to commemorate the 96-year history of speedway at the venue. By December 2025, all open wheel speedway had been moved to Waikaraka Park.

== Rugby ==
Between late March and early October, the stadium is used by the Ponsonby RFC for training and games.

== Concerts ==
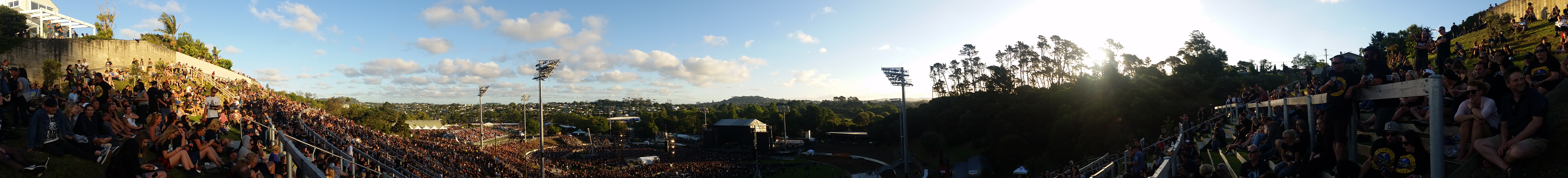
Guns N Roses at Western Springs Stadium

Two concerts held at the stadium were the largest concerts ever in New Zealand at the time. On 26 November 1983, one of the final dates of David Bowie's Serious Moonlight Tour was attended by either 74,480 fans (according to bootleg recordings) or by 83,000 (according to the promoter years later). On 14 March 1987, over 80,000 fans saw the concert by ZZ Top.

Other artists who have performed at the venue range from Six60 (2019, 2020), Led Zeppelin (1972), Bob Marley & The Wailers (1979), Elton John (1971, 1974, 1982, 1984 and 1990) to AC/DC (2010 and 2015). Including shows by Deep Purple 13/11/75, Alice Cooper 4/4/77, Rod Stewart 22/2/79, ELO (Electric Light Orchestra) 29/1/78, KISS 3/12/80, Fleetwood Mac 6/11/1977 and 22/3/80, Stevie Wonder 11/4/81 (weather delayed Monday), Bon Jovi 19/09/87, David Bowie 28/11/87, Pink Floyd 22/01/88, Mick Jagger 5/11/88, The Rolling Stones 11/2/73, 17/4/95, Genesis 23/11/86, Paul McCartney 27/3/93, Bruce Springsteen 28/03/03.

At the top of the hill that forms the amphitheatre is a street of houses – the residents have a view into the stadium from their back gardens. This has often been referred to by the artists on stage, who have often encouraged the residents to donate money to charity in lieu of an entrance fee – notably, Bono from U2 (1989) and Robbie Williams (2003). In 1993's ZooTV show, Bono made a mid-performance phone call to one of the neighbouring properties with a grandstand built in the backyard overlooking the stadium, and earlier in the day the band had sent up a selection of tour merchandise to attempt to sell to the viewers.

In January 2014, Western Springs was the venue for the Big Day Out, with a reported 40,000+ in attendance. It was the festival's first return to Auckland since Mount Smart Stadium in 2012 but the final time the Big Day Out was held in Auckland.

On 15 February 2014, rapper Eminem performed at the venue for an estimated 55,000 fans. It was his first in the country and is the first to be headlined by a rap act in the venue's history.
