= Ministock (New Zealand) =

New Zealand racing vehicle class

Ministocks are a class of car raced at many New Zealand speedway tracks. Ministocks are primarily youth grade but at some tracks are raced as an adult class. Ministocks are not currently a 'recognized' class in New Zealand; this means they are not able to run big championships in the North, South, and New Zealand Championships. In the youth grade drivers are aged from 12 to 16 and are taught to focus on how to handle a car on the racing track, learn racing rules and various sorts of tactics. Kids can start racing at the age of 10 at non speedway NZ tracks such as Waharoa. Once the drivers are at the stage of moving up a level, they are able to keep their existing cars and race in Adult Ministocks, or move into another class, i.e. Streetstocks, Stockcars, Superstocks, Modifieds, Midgets, Three Quarter Midgets, Saloons, Super Saloons, Production Saloons, Minisprints or Sprintcars.

== Adult Ministocks ==
This class is not raced on many tracks in the North Island but are more popular in the South Island, some South Island tracks also allow youth Ministocks to race on all their tracks.

== Cars ==
Ministocks are built to resemble New Zealand Stockcars, but unlike Stockcars, Ministocks are a non-contact class. The engines in them are from Nissans (a12) and also Toyota 3K engines. Nissan engines are the most popular with the Ministock class, but with donor cars slowly disappearing, more Toyota's are being used. These lightweight cars can go as fast as 90 km/h (60 mph).

== Tracks ==
(Around New Zealand)

A=Auckland (Waikaraka Park) H=Huntly (Huntly Speedway) R=Rotorua (Paradise Valley Raceway) AS=Ashburton (Ashburton Speedway) C=Christchurch (Woodford Glen) B=Hawkes Bay (Meeanee Speedway) S=Stratford (Stratford Speedway) DV=Dargaville (Finlayson Park) C=Christchurch (Ruapuna Speedway) I=Invercargill (Riverside Speedway) T=Cromwell (Central Motor Speedway) F=Egmont Village (Ferndene Park Speedway) D=Dunedin (Island Park) K=Kihikihi (Kihikihi Speedway) V=Wanganui (Oceanview Speedway) EM=Ellesmere Raceway (Ellesmere Motor Racing Club ) E=Blenheim (Eastern States) M=Mt Maunganui (Baypark Speedway) W=Wellington (Upper Hutt Family Speedway ) KK=Kaikohe (Kaikohe Speedway) G=Gisborne (Gisborne Speedway) N=Nelson (Nelson Speedway) A=Western Springs (Springs Speedway) MM=Meremere (Meremere Raceway) GM=Greymouth (Greenstone Park) P=Palmerston North (Palmerston North Speedway) Y=Westport (Sunset Speedway) OX=Oxford (Oxford Speedway) RV=Waharoa (Range View Speedway) TP=Taipa (Taipa Speedway) WK=Waiuku (Waiuku Dirt Track Club) WR=Whangarei (Whangarei Speedway)

== History ==
Ministocks were first started at the Wanganui Speedway by Darryl Taylor on 6 January 1996.

== See also ==
Dirt track racing in New Zealand
