= Aotea Centre =

Performing arts centre in Auckland, New Zealand

Coordinates: 36°51′07″S 174°45′45″E

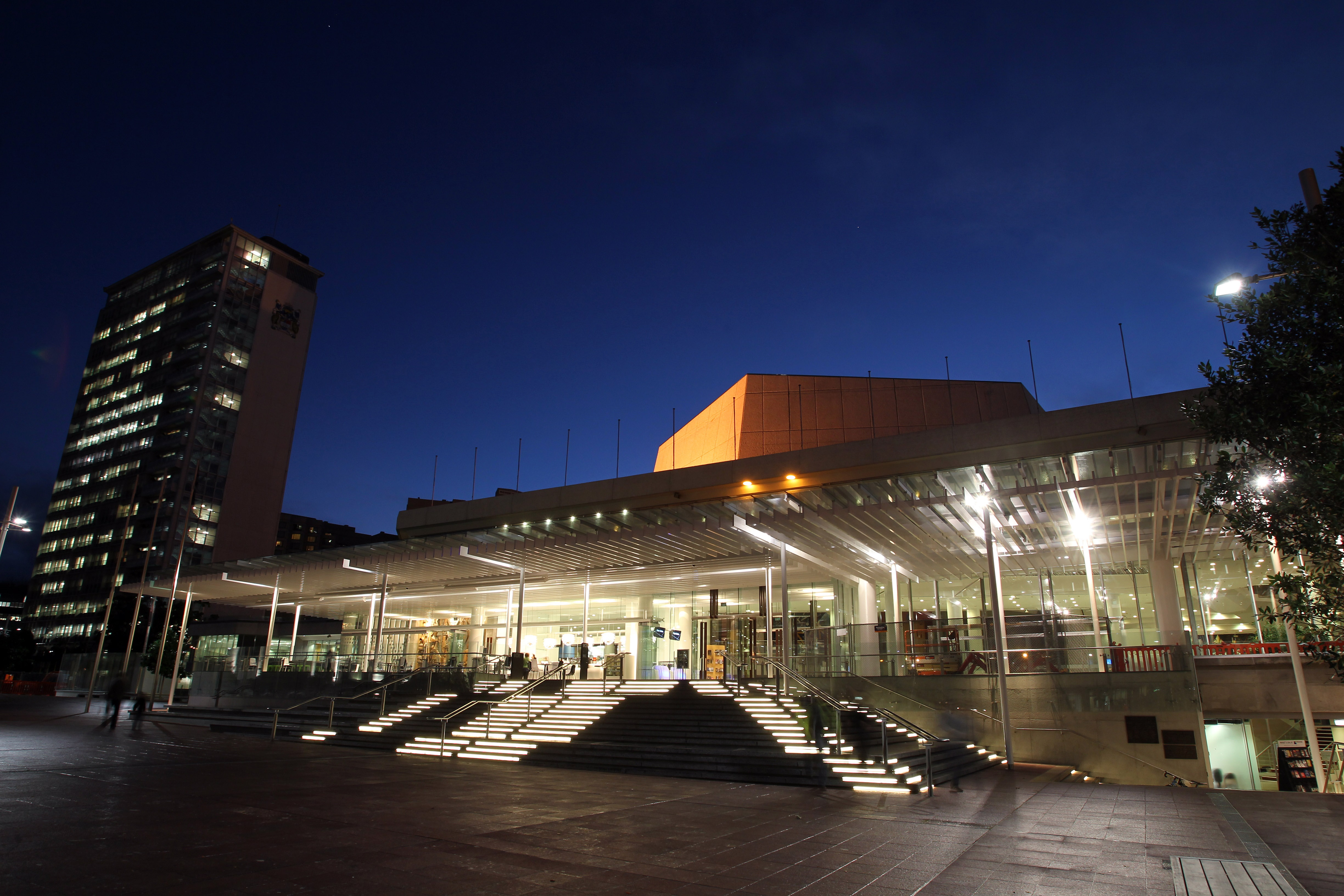
- View of venue from Aotea Square
- Interactive map of Aotea Centre
- Location: Auckland CBD
- Owner: Auckland Council
- Operator: Auckland Unlimited

Construction
- Built: 1985–89
- Renovated: 1998, 2011, 2012
- Cost: NZ$128.5 million NZ$15 million (2011 renovations)

Website
- www.aucklandlive.co.nz/venue/aotea-centre www.aucklandconventions.co.nz/venues/aotea-centre

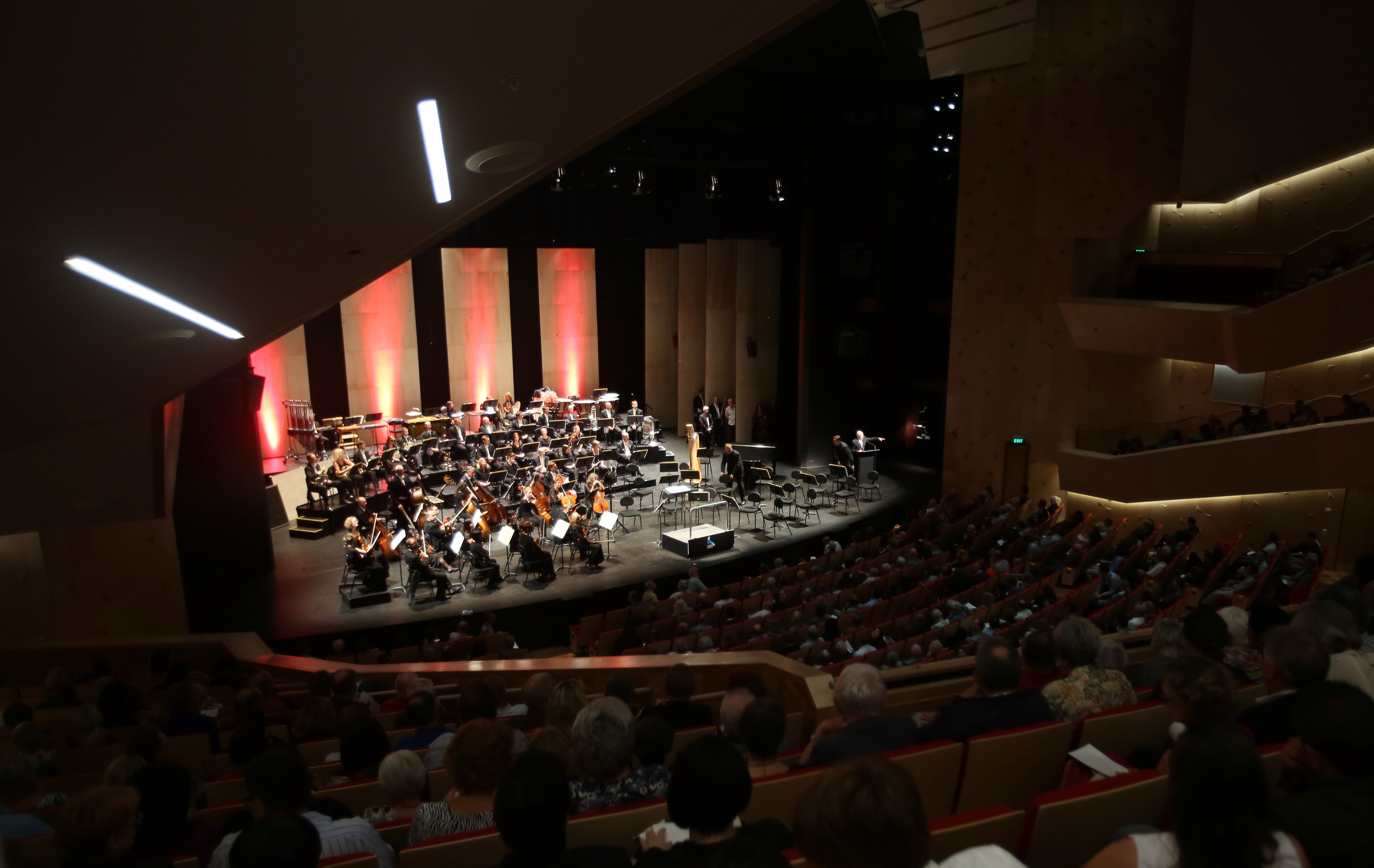
Interior of the Kiri Te Kanawa Theatre, Aotea Centre

The Aotea Centre (Māori: Aotea – Te Pokapū) is a performing arts and events centre in Auckland, New Zealand. Located at the western edge of Aotea Square, off Queen Street, the centre provides a cultural, entertainment and conventions venue space in the heart of the city, and is managed by Auckland Unlimited (which also operates the Auckland Town Hall and The Civic, both in the vicinity of the Square). The origin of its name is Motu Aotea, the Māori name for Great Barrier Island, which is the largest offshore island of New Zealand and approximately 90 km from downtown Auckland.

The main construction of the centre was finished in 1989, having cost NZ$128.5 million. The centre officially opened the following year.

Designed by the City architect Ewen Wainscott in 1974, the building was not actually built until more than a decade later. It won the NZIA Silver Medal award. Costs escalated greatly during construction resulting in several features being omitted. Due to poor acoustics, the main auditorium required a refit in the mid-1990s and underwent refurbishment in 2012. In the wake of this, the theatre won the inaugural Best Medium Venue at the Entertainment Venues of New Zealand (EVANZ) awards in late 2013.

The Centre provides a range of foyers, gallery spaces, and function rooms as well as the 2,139 seat Kiri Te Kanawa Theatre (formerly ASB Theatre, renamed in 2019) and the much smaller, 186-seat Herald Theatre, which is mainly used by small independent theatre companies.

In 2000 a design competition was held for the Aotea Precinct, and the winner was the landscape architecture-urban design team consisting of Ted Smyth, Rod Barnett and Dushko Bogunovich.

In 2011, an upgrade of Aotea Square also included a major facelift of the public stairs in front of the Centre, including creating a cafe space (The Terrace Café) under a large veranda open to the Square. The Centre hosted the draw for the 2023 FIFA Women's World Cup which was held in Australia and New Zealand.

Several New Zealand artworks are on display in the foyers of the Aotea Centre, including the digital work, Ihi, by Lisa Reihana, and the Aotea Cartouche by Dennis O'Connor made from Eritrea marble and Mount Somers limestone. ‘Waharoa’, a seven-metre-high gateway, stands at the entrance to Aotea Square, transforming it into a marae or meeting place. The Aotea Centre also holds Terry Stringer's sculpture of Dame Kiri Te Kanawa. Made of bronze, this statue sits on Level 3 of Aotea Centre, adjacent to Door D into the Kiri Te Kanawa Theatre. It was unveiled by Dame Kiri Te Kanawa herself. Finally, there is Taula, the Anchor Stone donated from the people of the Pacific Islands This was given to New Zealand at the 1998 Pacific Vision Conference. It is placed by the level 2 stalls at the front of the Aotea Centre. The arrow points to the north-east, in the direction of central Polynesia. The arrangement signifies Aotearoa New Zealand's North and South Islands.

There have been many shows and concerts at the Aotea Centre. They have a very wide variety, from cultural shows to DJs. The acclaimed Nepal Festival was held at this venue in previous years.
