= North Harbour Stadium =

Sports stadium in Auckland, New Zealand

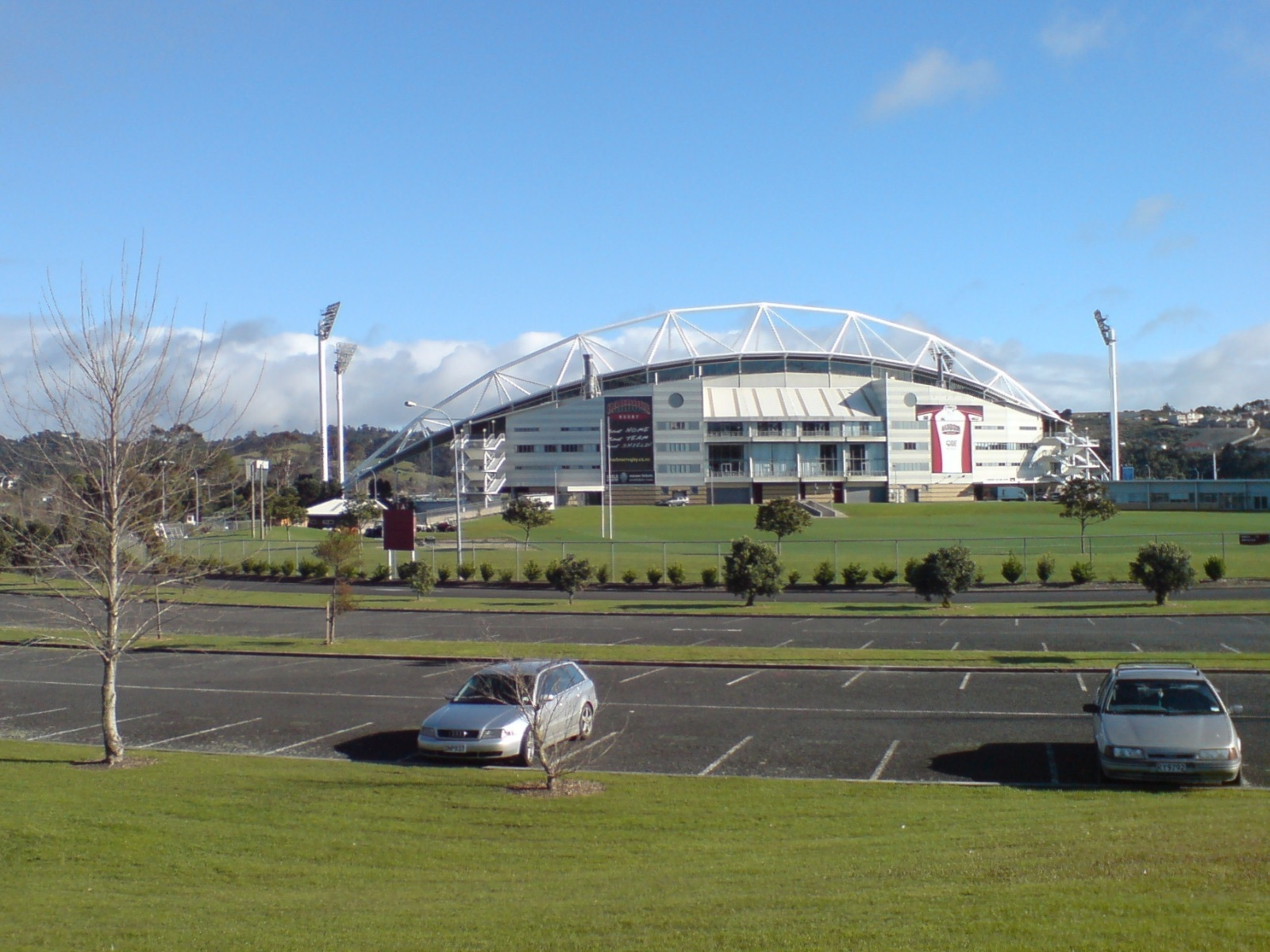
- Interactive map of North Harbour Stadium
- Former names: QBE Stadium (2014–2019)
- Location: between Coliseum Drive, Albany expressway, Don McKinnon Drive and Oteha Valley Road, Albany, Auckland
- Coordinates: 36°43′37″S 174°42′6″E
- Owner: Auckland Unlimited, Auckland Council (indirectly through Auckland Unlimited)
- Operator: North Harbour Stadium trustees (Auckland Stadiums)
- Capacity: 14,000
- Surface: Grass

Construction
- Opened: 8 March 1997
- Cost: NZ$41 million

Tenants
- Moana Pasifika (Super Rugby Pacific) (2025 onwards); North Harbour Rugby Union (Mitre 10 Cup) (1997–present); Auckland Blues (Super Rugby) (1999–present) (occasional); Auckland FC (A-League Men) (2024–present) (headquarters and training base); New Zealand Knights (A-League) (2005–07); Auckland Tuatara (ABL) (2019–2023); Waitakere United; New Zealand national football team

North Harbour Stadium is a stadium situated in Albany, Auckland, New Zealand. It was opened in 1997, after nearly a decade of discussion, planning and construction. Rugby union, association football, rugby league, and baseball are all played on the main ground. The neighbouring oval plays host to the senior cricket matches. The stadium also hosts large open-air concerts.

== History ==
It is the home ground for Moana Pasifika, which became the first Super Rugby team to make the stadium its fulltime home with an announcement in 2024. The team will begin playing its home games at the ground in 2025.

Since the stadium opened in 1997, it has been used by the North Harbour side in the National Provincial Championship, taking over from North Harbour's previous home venue, Onewa Domain in Takapuna. From 1997 to 1998 it hosted home games for the Chiefs when the Hamilton-based side represented North Harbour for a short time. In 1999, North Harbour fell under the Auckland Blues which typically hosted one of its home games in Albany each year until 2019. In 2022 the Blues hosted a one-off Super Rugby game at North Harbour when Covid restrictions prevented a fixture against the Highlanders from being taken to Whangarei.

It has played host to several rugby union and rugby league internationals. The New Zealand Warriors NRL team has played warm-up matches at the ground. It was the home ground for The New Zealand Knights, the one New Zealand soccer team in the otherwise all-Australian Hyundai A-League, from 2005 until their licence was revoked by the league at the completion of the 2006/2007 season. It played host to the FIFA Under-17 Women's Football World Cup in 2008. Radio Control Car Racing is occasionally held in a racetrack next to one of the carparks. On 20 June 2015 the stadium hosted the final of the FIFA Under-20 World Cup.

Between January 2014 and January 2019, the stadium was sponsored by QBE Insurance and called QBE Stadium.

The Auckland Tuatara of the Australian Baseball League use the Stadium as their Home Ground, The Residence began in 2019, after making renovations to make the stadium to make it suitable for baseball.

In July 2024, new A-League club Auckland FC announced that their headquarters and training base would be at this stadium.

In September 2024, it was announced that Moana Pasifika would make North Harbour Stadium its fulltime home, with five games to be hosted at the venue in 2025. It will be the first time since 2015 that more than one Super Rugby game is played at the stadium in a single season.

== Layout ==
It has an official capacity of 22,000 for sporting events. The stadium has four seating areas – the main grandstand, on the southern side, which seats 12,000 and contains corporate facilities; an uncovered stand opposite which seats 7,000; and grass embankments at either end which each seat 3,000.

The capacity was reduced by demolishing a big part of the northwestern stand to accomondate a baseball diamond for the Tuatara.

A media tower was built prior to the 2011 Rugby World Cup looking down on the uncovered seats and across to the grandstand.

The stadium is lit by four 45-metre tall light towers.

== Rugby Union World Cup 2011 ==
New Zealand won the Rugby World Cup 2011 hosting rights in 2005, prompting a debate in late-2006 as to which stadium should be used to host the final. Eden Park and Stadium New Zealand were considered to be the two main options with North Harbour as an outsider. Eventually, the New Zealand government decided that Eden Park would host the final, with North Harbour as the official reserve option. The stadium's media facilities were updated for matches that were hosted at the venue. A large broadcast tower was developed on the western side of the ground. It comprises three levels for venue operations and ground announcer on the first floor, television and radio commentators and television match official on the second with an retraceable window on the third floor for cameras.

Preceded by None; inaugural event	FIFA U-17 Women's World Cup; Final Venue; 2008	Succeeded by Hasely Crawford Stadium; Port of Spain
Preceded by Türk Telekom Stadium; Istanbul	FIFA U-20 World Cup; Final Venue; 2015	Succeeded by Suwon World Cup Stadium; Suwon
