= Civic Theatre (Auckland) =

Theatre in Auckland, New Zealand

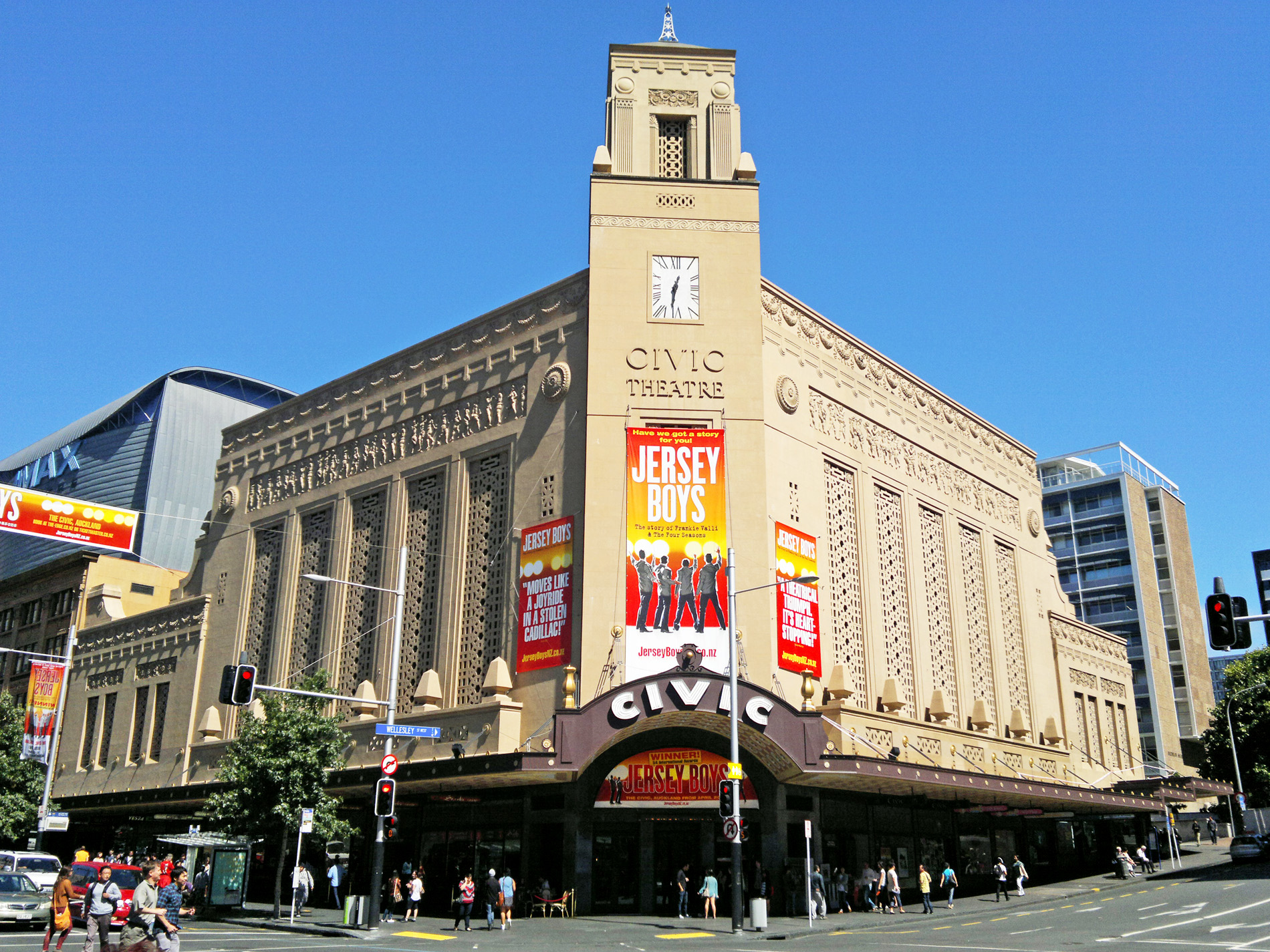
- The theatre from the front
- Interactive map of the Civic Theatre area

General information
- Type: Movie theatre; Performing arts venue
- Architectural style: Moorish Revival
- Location: 267 Queen Street, Auckland, New Zealand
- Coordinates: 36.851072°S 174.763920°E
- Inaugurated: 20 December 1929
- Renovated: 1998–1999
- Owner: Auckland Unlimited, Auckland Council (indirectly through Auckland Unlimited)
- Landlord: Auckland Live

Design and construction
- Architects: Charles Bohringer and William T. Leighton
- Main contractor: Fletcher Construction

Other information
- Seating capacity: 2,378

Heritage New Zealand – Category 1
- Designated: 27 June 1985
- Reference no.: 100

The Civic Theatre is a large heritage combination performing-arts theatre, live-music venue, and cinema seating 2,378 people in Auckland, New Zealand. First opened on 20 December 1929, it underwent a major renovation and two-year conservation effort in the late 1990s, and was reopened on 20 December 1999 (its 70th birthday). It is a famous example of the atmospheric theatre style wherein lighting and interior design create the illusion of an open sky complete with twinkling stars, giving the audience the impression of being seated in an outdoor auditorium at night. The Civic is managed by Auckland Live, a business unit of Auckland Unlimited.

== Significance ==
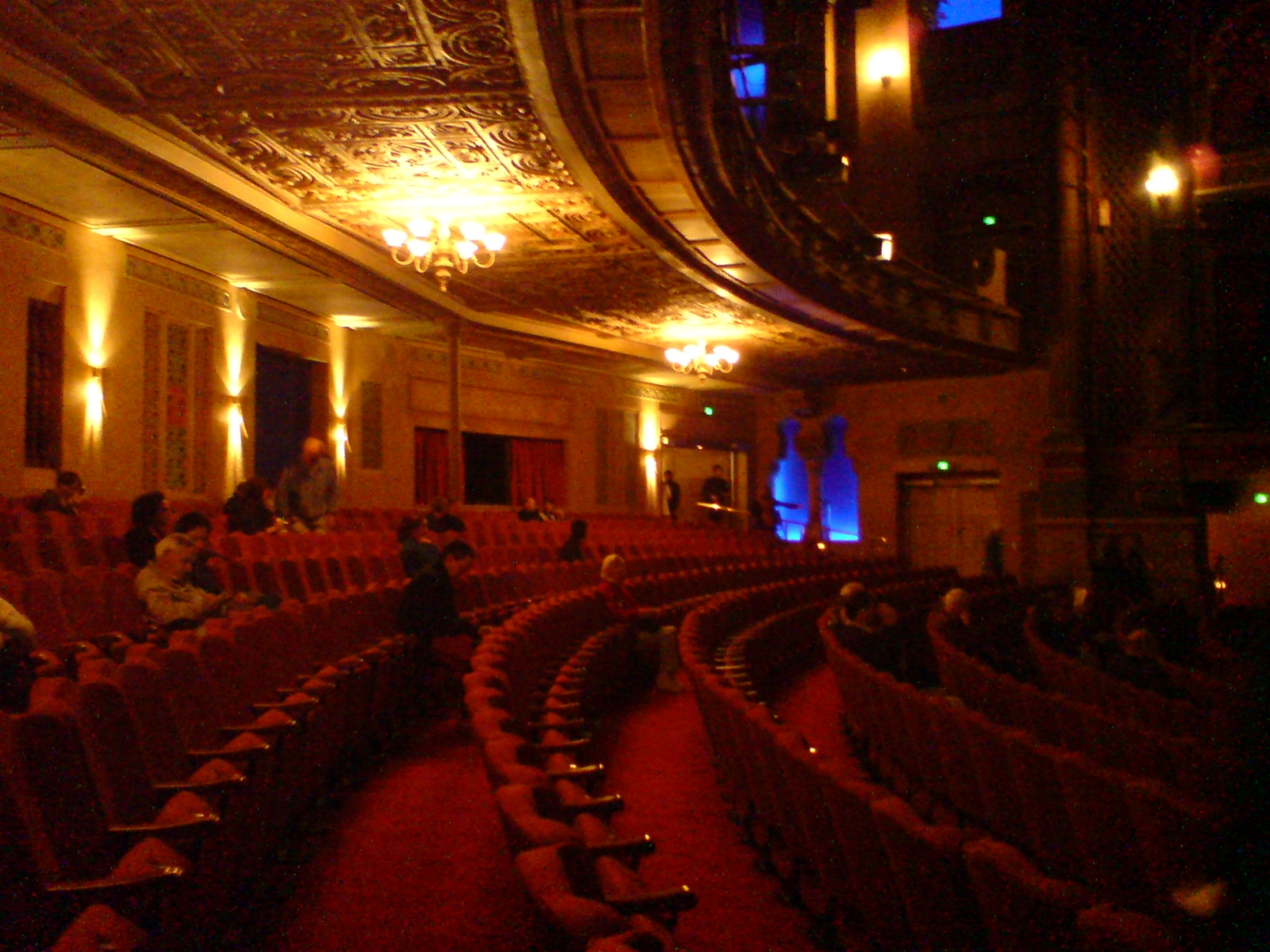
Civic Theatre auditorium

The Civic is internationally significant as the largest surviving atmospheric cinema in Australasia and was the first purpose-built cinema of its kind in New Zealand. It is also known for its Indian-inspired foyer, which includes seated Buddhas, twisted columns and domed ceilings. The main auditorium is of a similarly exotic style, imitating a Moorish garden with turrets, Minarets, spires and tiled roofs, as well as two life-sized panther statues on the proscenium arch and flanking the stage.

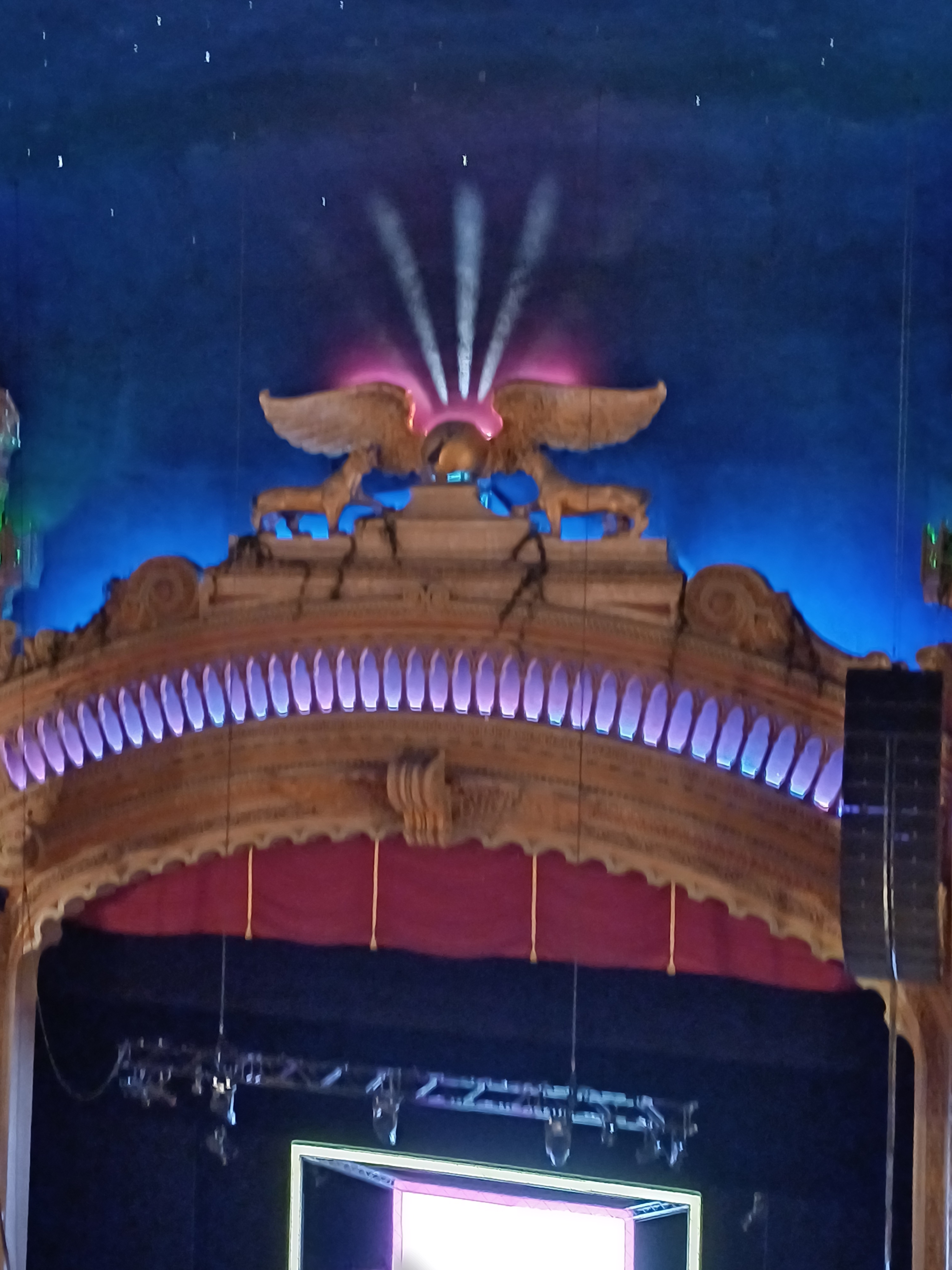
Photograph of the proscenium arch featuring panther statues

The Civic accommodated 2,750 people at its opening, and is still the largest theatre in New Zealand even at its current reduced-seating capacity.

== History ==
The theatre was the creation of Thomas O'Brien, who built a movie empire in Auckland's inner suburbs in the 1920s, and brought the atmospheric cinema to New Zealand when he opened Dunedin's Moorish-style Empire De Luxe Theatre in 1928. O'Brien persuaded a group of wealthy Auckland businessmen to build a massive atmospheric cinema on Queen Street, and managed to secure a £180,000 loan from the Bank of New Zealand for the project. The cinema was built by Fletcher Construction over eight months. However, the BNZ loan and soaring construction costs caught the attention of the New Zealand Parliament as the final price tag ballooned to over £200,000 (approximately NZ$18.9 million in 2016).

With supreme confidence in the future of Auckland, and with gratitude to those who have toiled with me in this great endeavour, I present to my fellow citizens the consummation of an ideal – the creating of a place of entertainment symbolising the progressive spirit of our beautiful city.

— Thomas O'Brien

The Civic opened amid great fanfare in December 1929, but the onset of the Great Depression contributed to disappointing attendances, as did O'Brien's stubborn insistence on showing British rather than the more popular American films; he eventually declared bankruptcy. After several modifications during the following decades, the theatre was eventually restored to an approximation of its original design in the late-1990s.

The Wintergarden, an underground ballroom in the Civic complex, became one of the major centres of entertainment for American soldiers who were stationed in Auckland during World War II. During this period, the venue was host to events such as concerts by Bob Hope, speeches by Eleanor Roosevelt and General Bernard Montgomery, and erotic dances by Freda Stark.

By the 1960s, the Civic struggled as a venue, as the theatre was too large for modern film audiences, and faced increased competition in the 1990s after the Aotea Centre opened nearby. In 1993, the building's lease reverted to the Auckland City Council, who considered demolishing the venue. After a campaign by a support group named the Friends of the Civic, the council spent $41.8 million dollars to refurbish the venue. It reopened in 1999 for both film and theatre, followed by the Wintergarden re-opening in 2000.

The theatre also gained some fame when its interiors were used in Peter Jackson's 2005 remake of King Kong, standing in for a New York theatre called The Alhambra.
