= Superstocks =

Racing car class in New Zealand

New Zealand Superstock Championship
- Category: Superstocks
- Country: New Zealand
- Inaugural season: 1965
- Drivers: 125 (2020)
- Drivers' champion: (New Zealand) Brad Uhlenberg 1NZv/85V
- Official website: speedway.co.nz

Superstocks (previously known as A Grade Stockcars) are a class of New Zealand Speedway (dirt track racing). Cars are designed with integral roll cages built to rules provided by Speedway New Zealand. Superstocks weigh 1,400 to 1,500 kilograms (220 to 240 st; 3,100 to 3,300 lb) and are usually powered with modified production car engines of up to 248 cubic inches (4,060 cc). Contact between cars is allowed and is intended as part of the class

== The cars ==
Cars are built by numerous different builders throughout the country, some of chassis are:

- Rees Race Cars
- Murray Gordge
- Graeme Barr Motorsport
- Podjursky Tanks
- Lintern Engineering
- HSP - Humphries Steel and Performance
- Lampp Engineering & Motorsport
- RRC - Robbs Race Cars
- Home-Builts
- Keith Gill Motorsport
- Hampton Tri-Rail
- Higgins
- Ward Built (971P)

Superstocks usually run engines such as

- Toyota VVTI V8
- Nissan VK56 V8
- Nissan VH41 V8
- Ford V8
- Chevrolet V8 or V6

Cars come in all different shapes and designs, varying from Gordge chassis designed by builder and driver Murray Gordge, to the "Tank" popularised by Dave Evans, and the Rees Race Cars Chassis built by Peter Rees and his sons Asher and Ethan.

== Championships ==
Superstocks compete in individual championships nationwide, including:

- New Zealand Superstock Championship
- World 240 Invitational Superstock Championship
- New Zealand Superstock Grand Prix
- North/South Island Superstock Championship
- Battle of the Stocks

== Teams Championships ==
- ENZED Superstock Teams Champs
- Superstock Team Nats
- Wanganui Teams Challenge
- Huntly Superstock teams Invitation

These championships are seen as the major events, and the big ones to win. Numerous other events are run throughout the country, ranging from track championships through to series run over a number of meetings.

Another major meeting is the annual New Zealand Superstock Teams Championship, run at Palmerston North International Speedway, in the first weekend of February.
