= Mount Smart Stadium =

Stadium in Penrose, Auckland, New Zealand

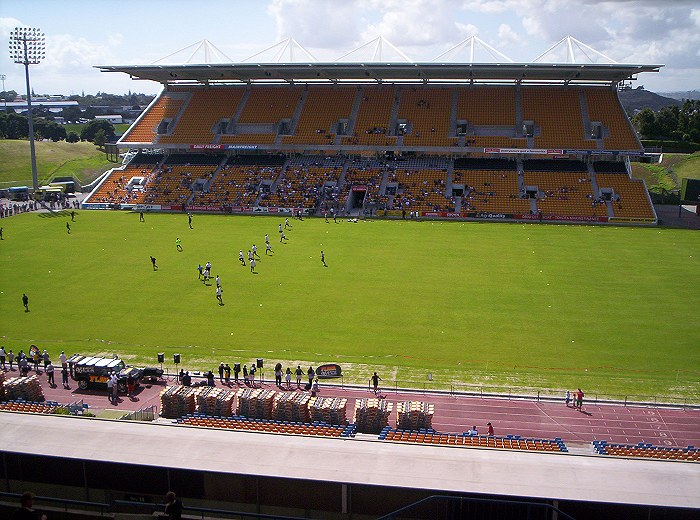
- Interactive map of Mount Smart Stadium
- Former names: Ericsson Stadium (1995–2006)
- Address: 2 Beasley Ave; Penrose, Auckland 1061
- Location: Auckland, New Zealand
- Coordinates: 36°55′6″S 174°48′45″E
- Owner: Auckland Unlimited, Auckland Council (indirectly through Auckland Unlimited)
- Operator: Auckland Stadiums (division of Auckland Unlimited)
- Capacity: Sports: 25,000
- Surface: Grass
- Public transit: Penrose Station

Construction
- Groundbreaking: 1965
- Opened: 1967

Tenants
- New Zealand Warriors (NRL) / (SL) (1995–present); Auckland Vulcans (NSWRL) (2008–2013); Counties Manukau Rugby Union (NPC) (2006–2008); Moana Pasifika (Super Rugby) (2021–2022); Football Kingz (NSL) (1999–2004); Auckland FC (A-League Men) (2024–present)

Mount Smart Stadium, branded as Go Media Stadium for sponsorship reasons, is a multi-purpose stadium in the suburb of Penrose, Auckland, New Zealand. It is the main home ground of the New Zealand Warriors of the National Rugby League and Auckland FC of the A-League Men, and occasionally hosts rugby union and international rugby league matches. Built within the quarried remnants of the Rarotonga / Mount Smart volcanic cone, it is located 10 kilometres south of the city centre, in the suburb of Penrose.

== History ==
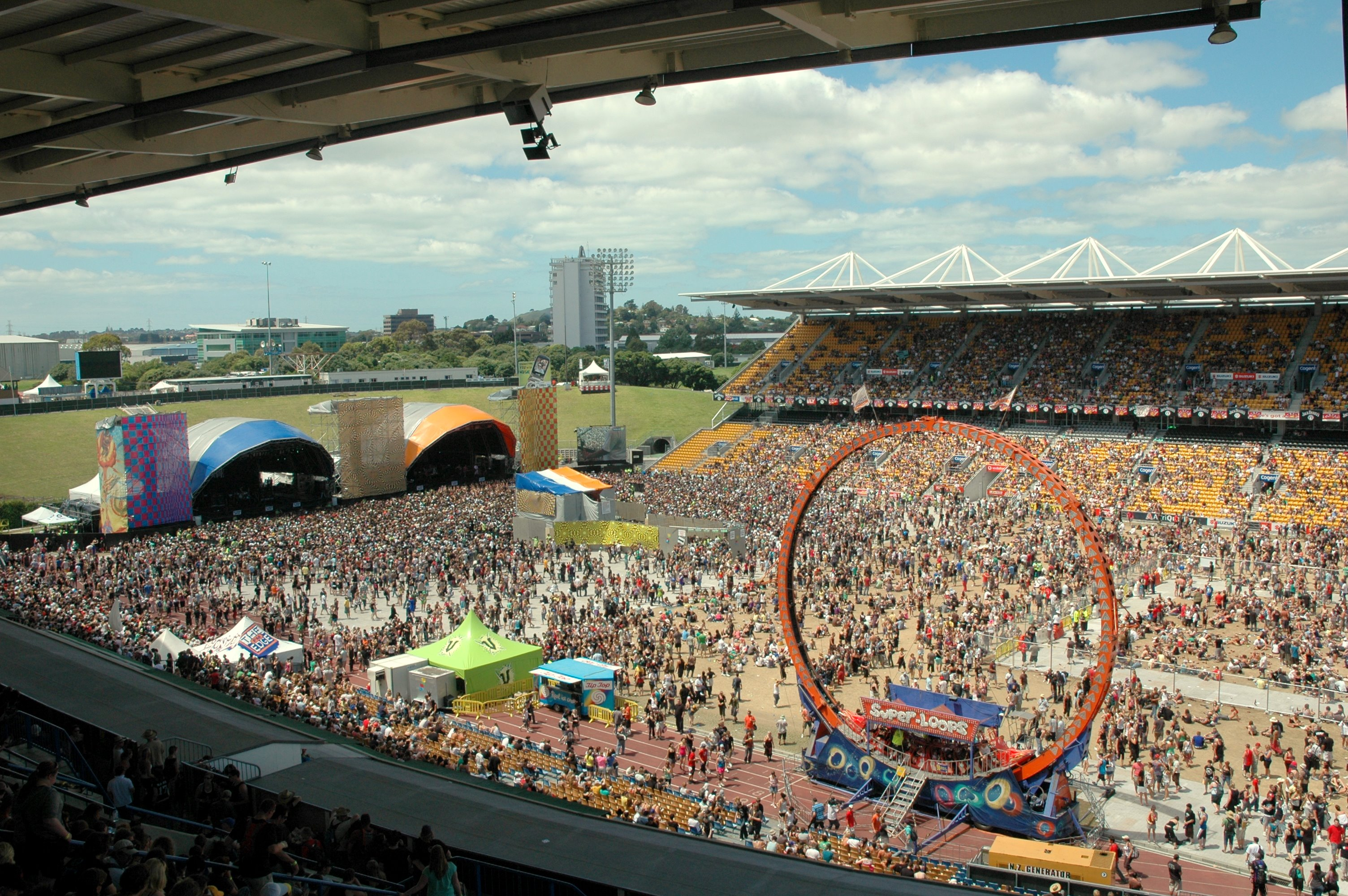
Big Day Out Double Stages, Auckland 2007

The Mount Smart Domain Board was established in 1943 with the purpose of transforming the former quarry site into a public reserve. In 1953, a plan was approved for a sports stadium which was officially opened in 1967. In 1978, it hosted 3 matches of the World Series Cricket tour of New Zealand. The stadium hosted track and field events including the highly successful Pan Am series during the early 1980s.

During the 1988 Great Britain Lions tour the Auckland rugby league team defeated the tourists 30–14 at Mt Smart before a crowd of 8,000. Mount Smart hosted its first rugby league international on 23 July 1989 when New Zealand and Australia played the third test of the Kangaroos 1989 New Zealand Tour. In front of 15,000 fans, Australia defeated the Kiwis 22–14 to wrap up the series 3–0.

The stadium was chosen as the Main Athletics Stadium as well as the opening and closing ceremonies venue of the 1990 Commonwealth Games. It was where the New Zealand men's national football team (the All Whites) played all their home qualifying games for the 1982 FIFA World Cup. This was the first occasion that New Zealand had qualified for a FIFA World Cup and the event captured the imagination of the nation with large crowds packing the stadium. It will also host the 2026 A-League Men Grand Final contested between Auckland FC and Sydney FC.

Adele holds the attendance record of the stadium, with 45,000 fans, who saw her play at Adele Live 2017. Ericsson Stadium was the host of the Super League's 1997 World Club Championship Final between Australian teams the Brisbane Broncos and Hunter Mariners. In front of 12,000 fans, the Broncos defeated the Mariners 36–12. Ericsson Stadium hosted three-quarters of the 1999 Rugby League Tri-nations' games, including the final, which New Zealand lost 20–22.

The stadium is now owned by the Auckland Council, following the merger of Auckland's regional authorities and managed by Auckland Stadiums. During the late 1980s and early 1990s, the back of the grandstand roof at Mount Smart was used for Bungee jumping. Following the first rugby league test at the stadium in 1989, Australian captain Wally Lewis and teammate Peter Jackson both 'took the plunge'.

Mount Smart Stadium also hosted the first standalone NRL Women's Premiership match between the New Zealand Warriors and St. George Illawarra Dragons on 22 September 2019. The Dragons won this match 26–6.

== Naming rights ==
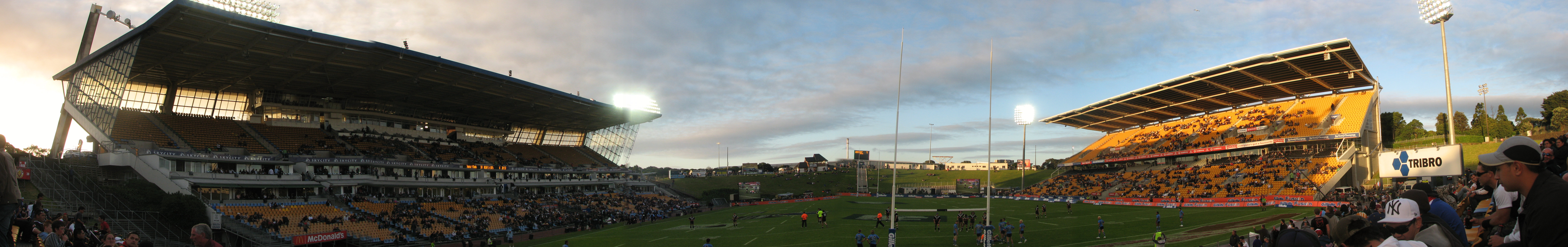
Panoramic image of Mt Smart Stadium in 2006

On 14 July 2017 the Stadium was temporarily renamed Manu Vatuvei Stadium for the Warriors vs Panthers game where the Warriors bid farewell to club legend Manu Vatuvei.

On 15 May 2023, the stadium became known as Go Media Stadium when Auckland Stadiums signed a naming rights deal with the advertising company. On 10 July 2024, the naming rights deal was extended until at least May 2028.

On 18 August 2023, the stadium was renamed Daniel Anderson Stadium for one day only as a fundraiser for former NZ Warriors coach Daniel Anderson who became an incomplete quadriplegic after a bodysurfing accident in 2022.

On 19 August 2024, the stadium was renamed Shaun Johnson Stadium for one week to commemorate the final home game of Shaun Johnson's career on 23 August 2024, before his retirement after the season.

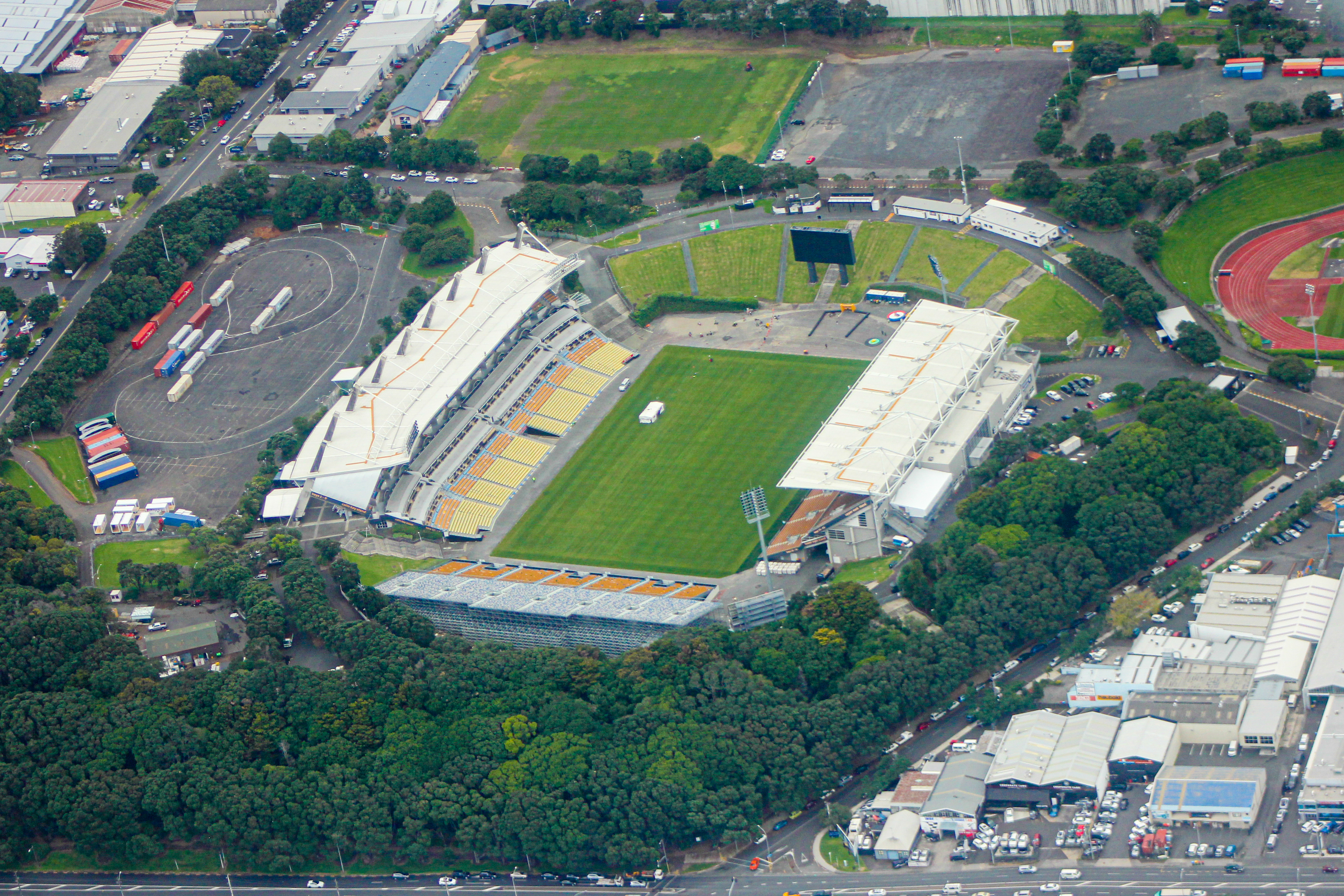
Aerial view of the stadium

== Tenants ==
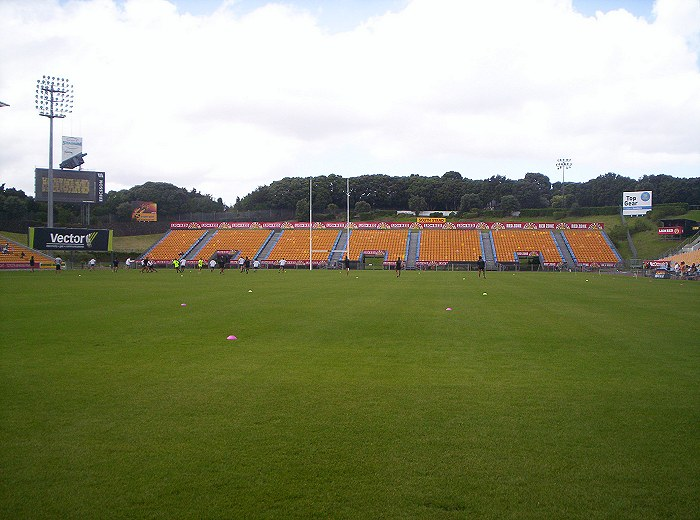
The South Stand at Mt Smart Stadium, shot from the northern end of the stadium. Warriors Open Day, February 2005.

It currently serves as the home ground for the New Zealand Warriors in the Australian National Rugby League and NRL Women's Premiership.

The Moana Pasifika rugby union club used the stadium as its primary home ground in 2022 and 2023, and hosted some matches at the stadium in 2024.

In March 2024, new A-League Men club Auckland FC was announced to be playing their first season at this venue. In July 2024, it was announced that the club had signed a five-year deal meaning the stadium would be Auckland FC's home until at least 2029. It is the former home of the Football Kingz of the Australian National Soccer League.

The Athletics Ground (officially Mt Smart Stadium Number 2) hosts athletics meets.

== Concerts ==
The capacity of the stadium for concerts is roughly 47,000 people. This can be expanded to 60,000 when the temporary north and south stands are installed.

Mount Smart Stadium was the Auckland venue of the Big Day Out music festival until 2012. In 2014, Western Springs Stadium served as the venue for the festival in Auckland. Among the concerts hosted were Rainbow Warrior Benefit Concert (Greenpeace 1986) featuring multiple artists including Neil Young on acoustic guitar and Jackson Browne, Graham Nash, Topp Twins, Dave Dobbyn and a Split Enz reunion within Mt Smart Stadium.

An album of Maori artists who came to support the aims of the Mt. Smart Stadium project was released in 1981. It was called The Mauri Hikitia. It reached no 4 on the New Zealand charts. It featured Rhonda, Ken Kincaid, Deane Waretini, and the Lightwood family.

Michael Jackson performed twice at the stadium, on November 9 and 11, 1996 during his HIStory World Tour. The combined attendance for both shows was 86,000. Destiny's Child, described by The New Zealand Herald in 2002 as 'the biggest girl group in the world', performed in the country for the first time at this venue in May 2002 during their Destiny's Child World Tour, drawing thousands of fans. Adele performed three times at the stadium during her Adele Live 2016 World Tour. In 4 Days, 130,000 people headed to Mount Smart Stadium to see her perform. Taylor Swift brought the Reputation Stadium Tour to the stadium for one night only, on 9 November 2018. It was the only New Zealand show on the tour, and sold out with 35,749 attendees.
