= Te Mārua Speedway =

Speedway stadium in Te Mārua, New Zealand

- Location: SH2, Te Mārua, Upper Hutt 5018, New Zealand
- Coordinates: 41°05′12″S 175°08′13″E
- Opened: 1968
- Length: 0.385 km (0.239 mi)

Te Mārua Speedway also known as Wellington Family Speedway is a speedway venue, located approximately 2 kilometres north from the centre of Te Mārua and on the west side of Stuart Macaskill Lakes.

== History ==
In 1964, the Wellington Stock Car Society was formed and stock cars were raced at the track, under the promotion of Stock Car Promotions Ltd. The first meetings took place in 1968 and the promotion continued until 1972. In between, solos (conventional motorcycle speedway) had made their debut at the facility, in addition to saloon and sprint cars.

The track became a significant venue for important motorcycle speedway events. It held test matches between New Zealand and England in 1973, which featured the legendary riders Ivan Mauger and Barry Briggs. The series was described as being the third time that speedway had been held in Wellington, with previous venues being at Kilbirnie (1930s) and Taitā (1940s).

On 11 February 1978, a qualifying round of the Speedway World Championship was held, won by Larry Ross. It has also hosted the New Zealand Solo Championship (the national championship of New Zealand) in 2004.

The track today features primarily stock cars and saloon and is run by a selected volunteer committee.
