= Stratford Speedway =

Speedway stadium in Stratford, New Zealand

- Location: 9A Flint Road West, Stratford 4394, New Zealand
- Coordinates: 39°19′19″S 174°16′48″E
- Opened: 1964
- Length: 0.38 km (0.24 mi)

Stratford Speedway is a motorcycle speedway venue in Stratford, on Flint Road East, off the New Zealand State Highway 3. The track races various types of cars including stock cars, saloons, midgets and superstocks. The track is owned by the Taranaki Stockcar Club.

== History ==
The first racing at the track (stock cars) took place during the 1964/1965 season.

The track became a significant venue for important motorcycle speedway events, including qualifying rounds of the Speedway World Championship in 1994.

It has also held the final of the New Zealand Solo Championship in 1977, 1994 and 1997.

The facility continues to host major events such as the Mini-sprint New Zealand Championship in 2024.
