= Tātaki Auckland Unlimited =

Auckland economic and cultural agency

- Tataki Auckland Unlimited
- Predecessor: Auckland Tourism, Events and Economic Development (ATEED) | Regional Facilities Auckland
- Formation: December 2020
- Type: Council-controlled organisation
- Purpose: Cultural, events and destination agency of Tāmaki Makaurau Auckland
- Headquarters: Levels 23 & 24/135 Albert Street, Auckland CBD, Auckland 1010
- Location: New Zealand
- Region served: Auckland
- Parent organization: Auckland Council
- Website: https://aucklandunlimited.com/

Tātaki Auckland Unlimited is the council-controlled organisation (CCO) of Auckland Council that serves as Auckland's cultural, events and destination agency. It manages and supports a range of major cultural, entertainment and visitor assets and programmes across the Auckland region, including Auckland Zoo, Auckland Art Gallery Toi o Tāmaki, Auckland Live venues auch as Aotea Centre, and major sports and entertainment facilities. It was formed in December 2020 from the merger of Auckland Tourism, Events and Economic Development (ATEED) and Regional Facilities Auckland. It self-funds some of its operations but is subsidised by the council for the majority.

== Background ==
Tātaki Auckland Unlimited was formed from the merger of Auckland Tourism, Events and Economic Development (ATEED) and Regional Facilities Auckland in December 2020, following a review of Auckland's council-controlled organisations. The review recommended that the two CCOs be amalgamated on the basis that they had similar goals and performed similar activities, some of which overlapped. The review concluded that having these functions all performed by a single entity would lead to cost savings and efficiencies, as well as a single coordinated programme for delivery of these functions. The council followed through with the recommendation – reducing the number of CCOs from five to four – and councilors voted to call the new organisation "Auckland Unlimited," with its Māori language name introduced as Tātaki Auckland Unlimited. At the time of merger, the two organisations had a combined annual budget of $175 million, with the new organisation expected to yield $6.7 million in annual cost-savings over the first decade of its existence. On 1 July 2025, responsibility for Auckland Council’s economic development functions transferred from Tātaki Auckland Unlimited to Auckland Council. Tātaki Auckland Unlimited subsequently became focused on its cultural, events and destination functions.

== Purpose ==
Tātaki Auckland Unlimited is Tāmaki Makaurau Auckland’s cultural, events and destination agency. It works to enrich Auckland through major and cultural events, regional venues and taonga, destination management and promotion, and activities that strengthen Auckland’s reputation and deliver cultural, social and economic benefits for the region.

The organisation's Statement of Intent lists its strategic responsibilities as being:

- "Experiences and events: We curate and deliver inspirational experiences, activations and events which drive and enhance Tāmaki Makaurau Auckland’s unique identity, vibrancy and prosperity."
- "Taonga and places: We look after and enrich Auckland’s taonga and places for the benefit of current and future generations"
- "Auckland’s reputation: We strive to ensure Tāmaki Makaurau Auckland is known and loved for what makes it unique and special."
- "All Aucklanders: We positively engage all Aucklanders through our diverse programme of experiences and events, and our accessible taonga and places."

== Organisation ==
=== Owned Facilities ===
- Aotea Centre
- Auckland Art Gallery
- Auckland Zoo
- Bruce Mason Centre
- Mt Smart Stadium
- New Zealand Maritime Museum
- North Harbour Stadium
- The Civic Theatre
- Western Springs Bowl
- Viaduct Events Centre
- Spark Arena (long-term lease to a third party)

== Controversies ==
=== Wayne Brown ===
==== 2022 Mayoral Campaign ====
In his 2022 Mayoral Campaign, candidate Wayne Brown was heavily critical of Auckland's council-controlled organisations - including Auckland Unlimited. He campaigned to "Take Back Control of Council Organisations", declaring that "Panuku & Auckland Unlimited are expensive organisations that need to prove their worth. They must be accountable and deliver real benefit for ratepayers or be shut down. [...] Auckland Unlimited is a sprawling empire that needs to be refocused back to top priorities." He was also reported as promising to stop ratepayer funding for the organisation, calling it a "tourism promotions company" and - at other times - a "travel agency" while questioning why the council was "subsidising" it. Upon assuming office as mayor, however, he was quoted as saying that he was "pleasantly surprised" with the organisation after attending a governing body briefing presented by the CCOs. During the campaign an article on the news website - Stuff - was critical of Brown's position on Tātaki Auckland Unlimited and his depiction of it as a "travel agency," pointing out that the organisation runs major Auckland assets such as "the zoo, theatres, stadiums, galleries and other facilities and self-funds 44% of its operation."

==== Art Gallery Controversy ====
In December 2022, Auckland Mayor Wayne Brown once again clashed with Auckland Unlimited over its management of the Auckland Art Gallery. The organisation presented its quarterly report to the CCO Direction and Oversight committee of the council's governing body; the presentation reportedly made mention of the fact that the Art Gallery missed its target of 13,000 visitors between July and September, and only had 9516. This reportedly led to the mayor making various "disparaging" remarks about the Art Gallery, including "How do we get to have 122 people looking after a few paintings in a building that nobody goes to?" and "9500 wouldn't run a dairy in terms of turnover." Tātaki Auckland Unlimited later clarified that the 9516 statistic referred to the visitors to paid exhibitions and that the Art Gallery received 54, 812 total visitors over that period.
