= New Zealand Superstock Teams Championship =

- Category: Superstocks
- Country: New Zealand
- Inaugural season: 1980/81 season
- Teams: 13 as of 2025
- Engine suppliers: 248 cubic inch V8
- Tyre suppliers: Hoosier

The New Zealand Superstock Teams Championship is a 2-day event held annually at Central Energy Trust Arena in Palmerston North, New Zealand. The event attracts crowds of 14,000 people on each day of the event, as they are entertained by up to 14 teams, all fighting with full-contact allowed for the ultimate New Zealand speedway crown. In 2018, the event gave the region a $5.2 million economic boost, an estimated $1.5M up from 2017.

== Racing ==
Superstocks racing allows for full contact, hardcore racing around oval dirt tracks with concrete walls in close proximity to the outside of the track. Drivers are entitled to push one another into the infield, up the wall or into one another in the fight for victory. With no blue flags backmarker cars may wait for the lead pack and if drivers wish, may take out lead cars to best suit their team. Superstocks teams racing consists of 2 teams facing off in each race progressing through qualifying night for a chance to be in the grand final. Teams of 5 cars take part with 1 car from either team sitting out each race as a reserve car. With a total of 4 cars in the race for each team most teams use a 2:2 tactic with 2 cars attacking and going to the victory while 2 cars block the other team from taking out their attackers. Because of the all-out nature of the sport there are often many rollovers and cars up into the catch fencing, leading to red flags where cars must stop in as little distance as possible, hold position and wait until the accident is cleared and the green flag is shown once again.

There are two other individual awards that are presented at the ENZED Superstock Teams Champs. The Spike Richardson memorial which is rewarded for the performance of the Teams Champs. Winners: 2024 - 5GB Charlie Sworder. The other award goes to the best Rookie driver and is named after Stephen Penn who lost his life doing what he loved in April 2022. The winners are 2023 - 26v Kaelin Mooney and 2024 - 74a Codi Chatfield.

== Deaths ==
There have been two deaths at the Superstock Teams Racing championship.

On 9 February 2009, Peter Barry, aged 44, was flown to Wellington Hospital in a critical condition with severe head injury. He succumbed to the injuries six days later at 6pm, February 12. Barry was driving a block car for the Kihikihi Kings versus the Hawkes Bay Hawkeyes when he lost consciousness from multiple hits between cars and the concrete wall. Barry's car continued to move slowly along the track for three quarters of a lap before a flag marshall stopped it. The coroner accepted fatalities were relatively rare in superstock racing, although the likelihood of injury was not. It was inherently high risk and violent, especially in teams' racing, where drivers crashed into each other on purpose. The coroner raised concerns about the HANS (head and neck restraint system) device, a safety item compulsory in many motorsports. The HANS device is now a primary piece of safety equipment used by every driver when racing.

In 2022 the Championships were not completed after the number 59P Stephen Penn who was driving for the Manawatu Mustangs went for an attempted hit into turn 3, sending himself into the concrete wall and sustained major injuries leading to his death on the track.

== Past Champions ==
Past Champions
Year	Date Held	Teams Entered	1ST	2ND	3RD
2026	February 7/8	12	Auckland Allstars (on appeal)	Stratford Scrappers	Great Britain Lions
2025	February 7/8	13	Canterbury Glen Eagles	Baypark Busters	Stratford Scrappers
2024	February 3/4/5	13	Canterbury Glen Eagles	Rotorua Rebels	Great Britain Lions
2023	February 4/5/6	14	Canterbury Glen Eagles	Palmerston North Panthers	Gisborne Giants
2021	February 6/7	13	Rotorua Rebels	Canterbury Glen Eagles	Gisborne Giants
2020	February 7/8	14	Hawkes Bay Hawkeyes	Gisborne Giants	Palmerston North Panthers
2019	February 2/3	13	Canterbury Glen Eagles	Hawkes Bay Hawkeyes	Wellington Wildcats
2018	February 3/4	14	Palmerston North Panthers	Gisborne Giants	Hawkes Bay Hawkeyes
2017	February 4/5	12	Hawkes Bay Hawkeyes	Great Britain Lions	Palmerston North Panthers
2016	February 6/7	12	Hawkes Bay Hawkeyes	Great Britain Lions	Gisborne Giants
2015	February 6/7	12	Palmerston North Panthers	Wanganui Warriors	Baypark Busters
2014	February 7/8	12	Baypark Busters	Wanganui Warriors	Hawkes Bay Hawkeyes
2013	February 8/9	13	Palmerston North Panthers	Manawatu Mustangs	Nelson Tigers
2012	February 4/5	12	Palmerston North Panthers	Nelson Tigers	Great Britain Lions
2011	February 4/5	11	Palmerston North Panthers	Stratford Scrappers	Nelson Tigers
2010	February 5/6	11	Nelson Tigers	Great Britain Lions	Manawatu Mustangs
2009	February 6/7	12	Palmerston North Panthers	Nelson Tigers	Great Britain Lions
2008	February 8/9	12	Palmerston North Panthers	Wanganui Warriors	Waikato Wanderers
2007	February 9/10	12	Palmerston North Panthers	Hawkes Bay Hawkeyes	Wanganui Warriors
2006	February 11/12	12	Palmerston North Panthers	Nelson Tigers	Manawatu Mustangs
2005	February 11/12/13	12	Manawatu Mustangs	Canterbury Glen Eagles	Baypark Busters
2004	February 20/21/22	12	Baypark Busters	Palmerston North Panthers	Waikato Wanderers
2003	February 21/22	12	Baypark Busters	Hawkes Bay Hawkeyes	Palmerston North Panthers
2002	February 22/23	12	Palmerston North Panthers	Rotorua Rebels	Baypark Busters
2001	February 23/24	12	Wellington Wildcats	Stratford Scrappers	Rotorua Rebels
2000	February 18/19	12	Nelson Tigers	Wellington Wildcats	Palmerston North Panthers
1999	February 19/21	12	Palmerston North Panthers	Wellington Wildcats	Bay of Plenty Raiders
1998	February 20/21/22	12	Wellington Wildcats	Rotorua Rebels	Palmerston North Panthers/Stratford Gladiators
1997	February 21/22	12	Stratford Gladiators	Palmerston North Panthers	Wellington Wildcats
1996	February 16/17	12	Taranaki Scrappers	Rotorua Rebels	Waikato Wanderers
1995	February 17/18	12	Waikato Wanderers	Auckland Allstars	Palmerston North Panthers
1994	February 18/19	12	Baypark Busters	Rotorua Rebels	Palmerston North Panthers/ Stratford Scrappers
1993	February 26/27	8	Waikato Wanderers	Palmerston North Panthers	Wellington Wildcats/ Hawkes Bay Hawkeyes
1992	February 28/29	10	Palmerston North Panthers	Wellington Wildcats	Christchurch Glen Eagles/Stratford Scrappers
1991	February 15/16	10	Palmerston North Panthers	Nelson Tigers	Baypark Busters/Waikato Wanderers
1990	February 16/17	10	Palmerston North Panthers	Wellington Wildcats	Stratford Scrappers/Rotorua Rebels
1989	February 17/18	10	Palmerston North Panthers	Baypark Busters	Waikato Wanderers/Nelson Tigers
1988	February 19/20/21	10	Stratford Scrappers	Palmerston North Panthers	Wellington Wildcats/Rotorua Rebels
1987	February 20/21	10	Stratford Scrappers	Palmerston North Panthers	Baypark Busters/Nelson Tigers
1986	February 21/22	10	Rotorua Rebels	Wanganui Warriors	Hawkes Bay Hawkeyes/Baypark Busters
1985	February 22/23	10	Palmerston North Panthers	Stratford Scrappers	Christchurch Glen Eagles/Nelson Tigers
1984	February 24/25	8	Palmerston North Panthers	Stratford Scrappers	Wanganui Warriors/Hawkes Bay Hawkeyes
1983	February 26/27	8	Stratford Scrappers	Bay of Plenty	Wellington Wildcats/Palmerston North Panthers
1982	February 26/27	8	Palmerston North Panthers	Wanganui Warriors	Palmerston North B/Stratford Scrappers
1981	March 7	8	Palmerston North B	Wanganui Warriors	Palmerston North Panthers/Hawkes Bay Hawkeyes

Team Records
Team	Entered	Semi Finals	Finals	Titles	2nds	Races	Wins	Win%
Palmerston North Panthers	40	34	23	18	5	133	105	79%
Hawkes Bay Hawkeyes	40	13	5	3	3	96	50	53%
Nelson Tigers	37	11	6	2	4	84	42	50%
Stratford Scrappers	39	14	8	4	4	93	47	52%
Rotorua Rebels	38	12	6	2	4	92	45	47%
Wellington Wildcats	33	12	6	2	4	82	40	49%
Canterbury Glen Eagles	33	5	5	4	2	70	23	30%
Manawatu Mustangs	31	6	3	2	1	77	34	45%
Wanganui Warriors	30	10	6		6	72	24	33%
Waikato Wanderers	29	9	2	2		72	37	53%
Baypark Busters	27	12	5	4	1	64	39	63%
Auckland Allstars	26	3	1		1	61	18	26%
Great Britain Lions	11	5	3		3	41	25	61%
Otago Cougars	7					14	0	0%
Kihikihi Kings	7					14	4	33%
Gisborne Giants	6	4	1		1	21	14	65%
Bay of Plenty	4	2	1		1	10	6	60%
Stratford Gladiators	3	3	1	1		11	8	73%
Rotorua Rookie Rebels	2					4	2	50%
Te Marua Terminators	2					4	0	0%
Blenheim Vikings	2					4	0	0%
Nelson Vipers	1					2	0	0%
Wanganui B	1					1	0	0%
Hawkes Bay Allstars	1					1	0	0%
