= Nelson Speedway =

Speedway stadium in Richmond, New Zealand

- Location: 105/123 Lansdowne Road, Richmond 7081, New Zealand
- Coordinates: 41°18′27″S 173°08′50″E
- Length: 354 m (0.220 mi)

Nelson Speedway is a motorcycle speedway venue near Richmond, it is located approximately 4 kilometres to the north of Richmond on Lansdowne Road, off Lower Queen Street and 11 Kilometres west of Nelson. The track races various types of cars, such as stock cars, superstocks, midgets, sprint cars, sidecars and saloons. The track is 354 metres and promoted by the Nelson Speedway Association.

== History ==
The facility has been a significant venue for important motorcycle speedway events, including qualifying rounds of the Speedway World Championship, (the first in 1988).
