= Meeanee Speedway =

Speedway stadium in Napier, New Zealand

- Location: 59 Sandy Road, Meeanee, Napier 4183, New Zealand
- Coordinates: 39°32′58″S 176°53′05″E
- Opened: 1961
- Length: 0.4 km (0.25 mi)

Meeanee Speedway is a motorcycle speedway venue, located in Meeanee, approximately 4 kilometres south of Napier, on Sandy Road, off the Meeanee Road. The track races various types of cars, in addition to motorcycle speedway. It opened in 1961 and is the home of Hawkes Bay Speedway Club.

== History ==
The track became a significant venue for important motorcycle speedway events, including qualifying rounds of the Speedway World Championship, the first in 1981.

It has also held the final of the New Zealand Solo Championship in 1976, 1992 and 1998.

The facility continues to host stockcars and midgets and held the Hawkes Bay Championships in 2024.
