= Dirt track racing in New Zealand =

Speedway is a popular type of motorsport that takes place on oval tracks in New Zealand. A number of tracks throughout the country provide regular racing programs and sanctioned racing series. The seasons tend to be from November to April.

== Types of event ==
There are several types of event in New Zealand speedway including

- championship meetings
- Superstock and Stockcar teams racing
- demolition derbies
- regular club and local points meetings.

Some types of racing (such as figure 8 racing) are banned by Speedway New Zealand, but are run from time to time by independent promoters.

== Travelling Series ==
There are several types of travelling series in New Zealand speedway including

- Oval Superstars Tour
- Saloon Speedweek
- Pro Dirt Super Saloons
- Super Saloon Supercup
- Hydraulink War of the Wings
- StreetStock Tri Series

== Classes ==
The classes that race at New Zealand tracks include

- 1/4 midgets (Kiwi Kidz)
- Sprint cars
- Midget cars
- Three quarter (TQ) midgets
- Superstocks
- Stockcars
- Super saloons
- Saloons
- Production saloon
- Streetstocks
- Modifieds
- Ministocks (adult and youth)
- Minisprints
- Solos
- Sidecars
- Youth Saloons
- Demolition derby cars
..

== Venues ==
=== North Island ===
Track Name	Code	Location	Type	Classes	Results
Baypark	M	Mount Maunganui	470 meter clay oval	Super Saloons, Saloons, Stockcars, Mini Stocks, Sprintcars	Results
Gisborne Awapuni Speedway	G	Gisborne	390 m. clay oval	Production Saloons, Superstocks, Stockcars, Ministocks, Super Saloons, Saloons, Streetstocks, Three Quarter Midgets, Sidecars, Solos	Results
Huntly Placemakers Speedway	H	Huntly	380 m. clay oval	Modifieds, Minisprints, Super Saloons, Saloons, Production Saloons, Superstocks, Stockcars, Ministocks	Results
McDonald's Kihikihi Speedway	K	Kihikihi	400 m. clay oval	Superstocks, Stockcars, Ministocks, Streetstocks, Saloons, Production Saloons, Sidecars, Minisprints	Results
Meremere Speedway	M	Meremere	dirt triangular oval	Super Saloons, Saloons, Sidecars, Superstocks, Stockcars, Ministocks, Streetstocks, Three Quarter Midgets	
Whangarei Speedway	WR	Whangārei	clay oval	Saloons, Stockcars, Production Saloons	
Ocean View Speedway	V	Whanganui	344 m. clay oval	Production Saloons, Sidecars, Superstocks, Stockcars, Mini Stocks	Results
Palmerston North International Speedway	P	Palmerston North	434 m. clay/lime oval	Super Saloons, Saloons, Superstocks, Stockcars, Ministocks, Street Stocks, Sprintcars, Minisprints, Midgets, Sidecars	
TWS Paradise Valley Raceway	R	Rotorua	365 m. clay/lime oval	Minisprints, Modifieds, Production Saloons, Saloons, Superstocks, Stockcars, Streetstocks, Youth Ministocks	Results
Rangeview Speedway	RV	Waharoa	clay oval	Formula 500s, Minisprints, Mini Stocks, Saloons	
Rosebank Domain	A	Avondale, Auckland	320 m. clay oval	Sidecars, Solos, 1/4 Midgets	Results
Stratford International Speedway	S	Stratford	380 m. papa mudstone oval	Modifieds, Super Saloons, Saloons, Superstocks, Stockcars, Mini Stocks, Street Stocks	Results
Waikaraka Park / Auckland Speedway	A	Onehunga, Auckland	450 m. clay oval	Modifieds, Super Saloons, Saloons, Stockcars, Super Stocks, Street Stocks, Minisprints, Ministocks, Midgets, Three Quarter Midgets, Sprintcars, 1/4 Midgets, F2 Midgets	
Wellington Family Speedway	W	Wellington	385 m. clay/sand/lime oval	Modifieds, Sprintcars, Super Saloons, Saloons, Superstocks, Minisprints, Youth Mini Stocks, Stockcars, Streetstocks.	Results
Meeanee Speedway	B	Meeanee, Napier	400 m. clay/sand/lime oval	Sidecars, Solos, TQ Midgets, Super Saloons, Saloons, Stockcars, Superstocks, Streetstocks, Production Saloons, Youth Ministocks and Kiwi Lites	
Harrisville Speedway		Bulls, New Zealand	480 m. dirt oval		
21 Speedway		Meremere	TBD banked dirt oval		

=== South Island ===
Track Name	Code	Location	Type	Classes	Results
Central Motor Speedway	T	Cromwell	446 m. clay oval	Midgets, Saloons, Sidecars, Stockcars, Mini Stocks	Results
Eastern States Speedway	E	Blenheim	420 m. clay oval	Super Saloons, Saloons, Production Saloons, Superstocks, Stockcars, Streetstocks, Ministocks, Sprintcars, Modifieds, Sidecars	Results
Greenstone Park Speedway	GM	Greymouth	403 m. clay oval	Modifieds, Saloons, Stockcars, Mini Stocks, Street Stocks, Three Quarter Midgets	
Beachlands Speedway	D	Waldronville	408 m. clay oval	Saloons, Stockcars, Mini Stocks, Street Stocks, Three Quarter Midgets	Results
Riverside Raceway	I	Invercargill	410 m. clay/crusher dust/lime oval	Midgets, Saloons, Stockcars, Standard Stocks, Street Stocks, Sprintcars, Youth saloons, production saloons, Modified Sprintcars	Results
Ruapuna Speedway	C	Christchurch	406 m. & 205 m. clay ovals	Midgets, Three Quarter Midgets, Quarter Midgets, Sprintcars, Modified Sprints, Six Shooters	Results
Ellesmere Motor Racing Club	C	Selwyn, Christchurch	443 m. clay oval	Midgets, Three Quarter Midgets, Sidecars, Sprintcars, Modified Sprints, Quarter Midgets, Productions, Six Shooter, Moto X	
Top of the South Speedway	N	Nelson	343 m. clay oval	Midgets, Three Quarter Midgets, Modifieds, Super Saloons, Sidecars, Stockcars, Street Stocks, Superstocks, Production Saloons	Results
Sunset Speedway	Y	North Beach, Westport	296 m. crushed mudstone oval	Saloons, Solos, Mini Stocks, Street Stocks	
Woodford Glen Speedway	C	Kaiapoi	410 m. clay mix oval	Modifieds, Saloons, Stockcars, Mini Stocks, Super Stocks, Street Stocks, Super Saloons	Results

== Class Champions List ==
=== SNZ New Zealand SprintCar Championship Winners ===
Season	Track	1ST	2ND	3RD
2024	Western Springs	Joel Myers Jr 46USA	Dean Cooper 84P	Jamie Larsen 82P
2023	Ruapuna	Daniel Thomas 3NZK	Michael Pickens 1NZA	Matthew Leversedge 78C
2022	Not held due to Covid			
2021	Baypark	Michael Pickens 2NZA	Jonathan Allard 11USA	Daniel Thomas 55K
2020	Palmerston North	Jamie Larsen 2NZP	Michael Pickens 3NZA	Rodney Wood 51M
2019	Cromwell	Buddy Kofoid 8USA	Jamie Larsen 82P	Michael Pickens 2NZA
2018	Western Springs	Kerry Brocas 21A	Michael Pickens 54A	James Dahm 6M
2017	Ruapuna	Jamie Larsen 3NZP	Jonathan Allard 1NZ(USA)	Jamie McDonald 71A
2016	Baypark	Jonathan Allard 0USA	Dean Brindle 22A	Jamie Larsen 82P
2015	Palmerston North	Jamie Duff 19A	Ricky Logan 18USA	Daniel Eggleton 78A
2014	Cromwell	Rodney Wood 51M	Dean Brindle 2NZA	Jamie McDonald 71A
2013	Western Springs	Peter Murphy 11USA	Dean Brindle 22A	Daniel Eggleton 78A
2012	Ruapuna	Sammy Swindell 1USA	Jonathan Allard 1NZ(USA)	Austen Wheatley 44USA
2011	Baypark	Jonathan Allard 2NZ(USA)	Tommy Tarlton 21USA	Peter Murphy 11USA
2010	Cromwell	Rodney Wood 51M	Jonathan Allard 0USA	Ricky Logan 10USA
2009	Palmerston North	Dean Brindle 22A	Ricky Logan 10USA	Greg Pickerill 18A
2008	Baypark	Carl Wilson 56A	Kerry Jones 84M	Phil Game 77A
2007	Western Springs	Jamie McDonald 2NZA	Kerry Jones 1NZM	Allan Wakeling 27A
