= List of concerts at the National Stadium, Cardiff Arms Park =

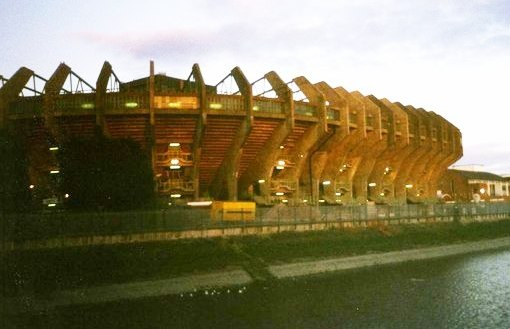
The National Stadium, Cardiff Arms Park

Concerts that were held at the National Stadium, Cardiff Arms Park, Cardiff, Wales, between 1987 and 1996 and included U2, Bon Jovi, Michael Jackson and The Rolling Stones. The last concert at the stadium was performed by Tina Turner on 14 July 1996. In 1997 the National Stadium was demolished to make way for the Millennium Stadium.

== Concerts ==
Year	Date	Headline artist	Tour	Supporting artists
1987	21 June	David Bowie	Glass Spider Tour	Big Country and The Screaming Blue Messiahs
1987	25 July	U2	Joshua Tree Tour	The Pretenders, The Alarm, The Silencers
1988	26 July	Michael Jackson	Bad World Tour	Kim Wilde
1989	5 August	Simple Minds	Street Fighting Years Tour	The Silencers, The Darling Buds, Texas
1990	16 July	The Rolling Stones	Urban Jungle Tour	Dan Reed Network
1992	23 May	World Choir	10,000 Voices at Cardiff Arms Park	Tom Jones, Dennis O'Neill, Gwyneth Jones and Owain Arwel Hughes (conducting)
1992	11 June	Dire Straits	On Every Street Tour	
1992	19 July	Bryan Adams	Waking Up the World Tour	Squeeze, Extreme
1992	5 August	Michael Jackson	Dangerous World Tour	Kris Kross
1993	29 May	World Choir II	World Choir II at Cardiff Arms Park	Shirley Bassey
1993	18 August	U2	Zoo TV Tour	Stereo MCs and Utah Saints
1995	21 June	Bon Jovi	These Days Tour	Van Halen (Balance Tour), Thunder, Crown Of Thorns
1995	23 July	R.E.M.	Monster Tour	The Cranberries, Del Amitri and Belly
1996	14 July	Tina Turner	Wildest Dreams Tour	Toto
Cancelled concerts
1991	27 June	Status Quo and Rod Stewart	Rockin' All Over The Years Tour	Joe Cocker

== See also ==
- Music of Cardiff
- List of concerts at the Millennium Stadium
- List of events held at the Millennium Stadium
