= List of concerts at the Millennium Stadium =

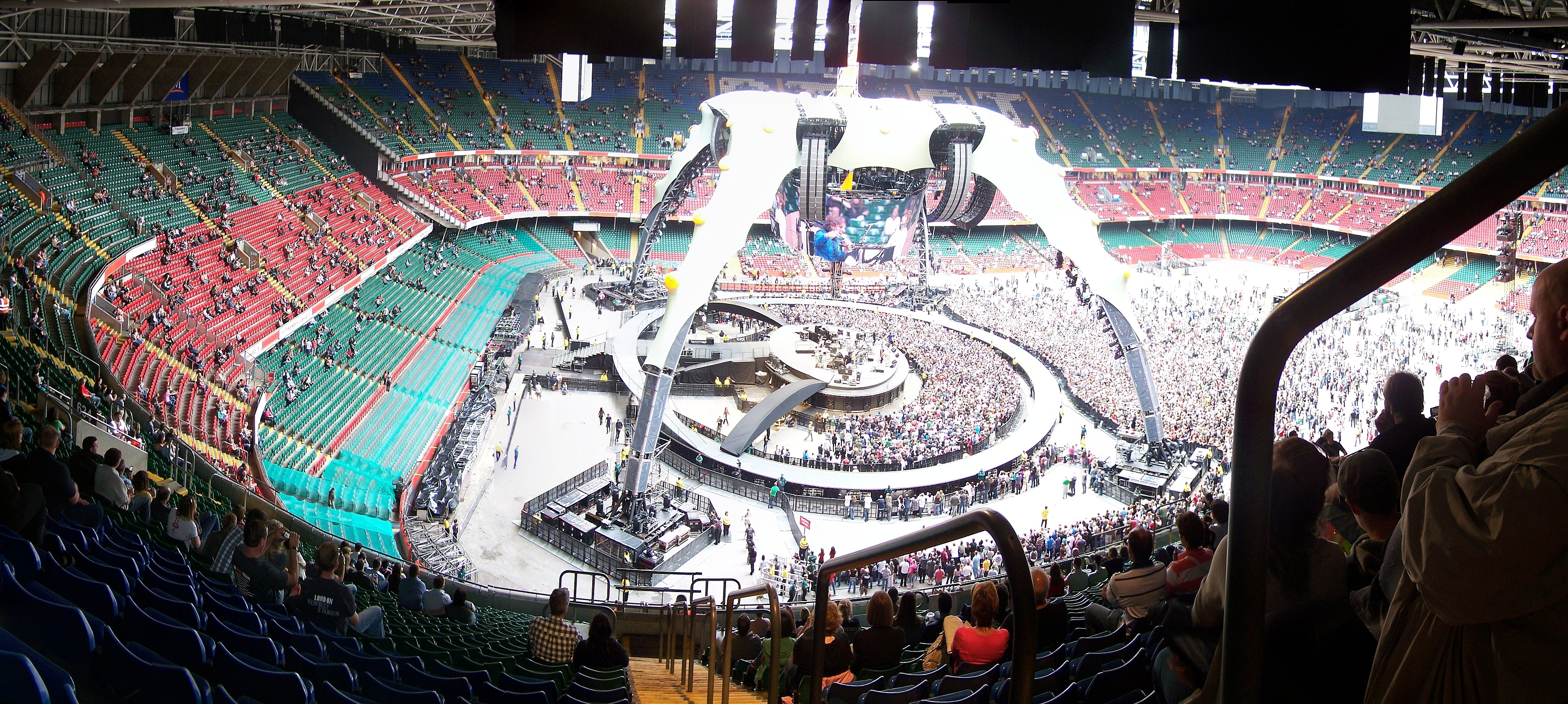
The £20 million stage, dubbed The Claw, used on the U2 360° Tour at the stadium.

Concerts have been held at the Millennium Stadium in Cardiff, Wales, since the stadium's opening in 1999. The musicians who have played at the stadium include Tina Turner, Beyoncé, Spice Girls, The Rolling Stones, Rod Stewart, Paul McCartney, Madonna and Rihanna. The highest concert audience at the stadium was 73,354, who saw U2 in 2009. In 2018 Ed Sheeran performed for a record-breaking 4 nights at the Stadium on his ÷ Tour. The stadium's total seating capacity for sporting events is 73,434.

== History ==
The first concert held was on New Year's Eve 1999 when the Manic Street Preachers headlined Manic Millennium, followed two days later by a concert for the BBC's Songs of Praise programme, with Cliff Richard performing his UK number-one single "The Millennium Prayer". This event attracted an attendance of 66,000.

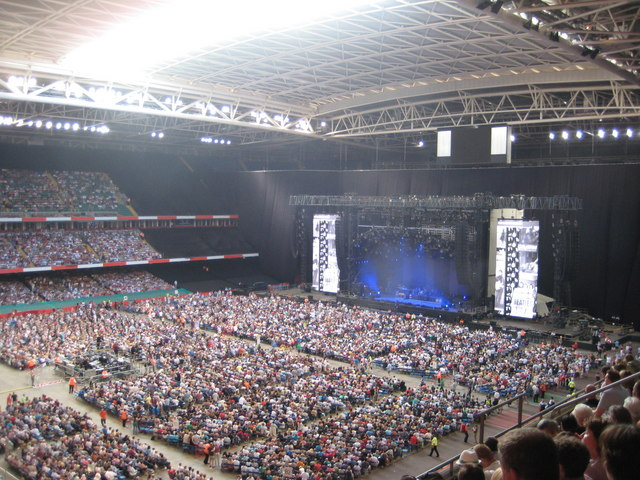
The Millennium Stadium with the roof closed during Paul McCartneys Up and Coming Tour with the Arena Partition Drape System

During 2003, the stadium established a new in-house promotions and events department to attract major concerts to the stadium, taking over from SJM Concerts. The stadium's General Manager Paul Sergeant at the time said of the change, "We looked at the current way our business was run, (and) realized that if we do it ourselves and have direct contact with the event owners and promoters...we will be able to offer an improved service".

At the end of January 2005, the stadium hosted a Tsunami Relief Cardiff, a tsunami relief concert, in aid of victims of the 2004 Indian Ocean tsunami, with Eric Clapton headlining the event. On 22 August 2009, U2 played at the stadium as part of their European leg of their U2 360° Tour, playing to a record-breaking concert attendance for a concert at the stadium of 73,354.

In 2005 the stadium installed an "Arena Partition Drape System" – a 1,100 kg black curtain made up of 12 drapes measuring 9 m (30 ft) x 35 m (115 ft) – to vary the audience from a capacity of over 73,000 down to between 12,000 and 46,000, depending on the four different positions that it can be hung. The curtains can be stored in the roof of the stadium when not in use. The £1m cost of the curtain was funded by the stadium, the Millennium Commission, its caterers Letherby and Christopher (Compass Group) and by the then Wales Tourist Board. The curtain was supplied by Blackout Ltd.

It was feared that music concerts and sporting events would take business away from local shops. However, David Hughes Lewis, chairman of Cardiff Retail Partnership, said in 2005 that "Despite initial concerns that major events in the Millennium Stadium hit trading in the shops, it now believed such events had a positive impact...When people come to Cardiff for the concerts, they more often than not arrive the night before and they'll spend the morning shopping".

=== Concerts ===
Concerts
Year	Day/month	Headline artist	Name of concert, tour or event	Supporting artists	Notes	Ref(s)
1999	31 December	Manic Street Preachers	Manic Millennium	Super Furry Animals, Feeder, Shack, and Patrick Jones.	This was the first rock concert held at the new stadium. There were safety concerns prior to the concert that there may be a "ripple effect" if the crowd started to jump up and down at the same time, although there was no danger of the stands collapsing. It was thought that the sway might panic the crowd into stampeding. Special props were put in place to support part of the stand before the concert. The 57,000 tickets were sold out a month before the concert and set a European indoor crowd record. The DVD Leaving the 20th Century was made of the event.	
2000	2 January	Cliff Richard	Millennium Songs of Praise.	Bryn Terfel, Daniel O'Donnell, Andrew Lloyd Webber and the Band of the Welsh Guards.	The concert was made for the BBC television programme Songs of Praise. It was the largest broadcast event in the programme's history, with 66,000 attending the event and was simultaneously broadcast live on BBC One.	
2000	9 July	Tina Turner	Twenty Four Seven Tour	Lionel Richie	Tina Turner said of the Twenty Four Seven Tour that, "This will be my final big stadium rock tour". Turner has subsequently toured again in her 50th Anniversary Tour throughout Europe and North America.	
2001	17 June	Bon Jovi	One Wild Night Tour	Matchbox Twenty, Delirious		
2001	14 July	Robbie Williams	Weddings, Barmitzvahs & Stadiums Tour	Toploader		
2001	15 July	Robbie Williams	Weddings, Barmitzvahs & Stadiums Tour	Toploader		
2001	21 July	Stereophonics	A Day at the Races	The Black Crowes, Ash, and The Crocketts.	An open-air concert was originally set for Chepstow Racecourse, called "A Day at the Races" and it was expected to attract a record crowd of 80,000 fans. On 18 April 2001, the concert was moved to the Millennium Stadium, because the racecouse was within the foot-and-mouth infected area. The concert was part of the Just Enough Education to Perform (J.E.E.P.) Tour. The DVD A Day at the Races was made of the event.	
2001	20 October	Atomic Kitten	Showtime @ The Stadium	S Club 7, A1, Steps, Charlotte Church, Sinéad O'Connor, Petula Clark, Russell Watson and Damage	A charity concert to raise funds for the Red Hot Aids Charitable Trust and Children in Need.	
2003	20 December	Stereophonics	You Gotta Go There to Come Back Tour	Feeder, Ocean Colour Scene, and Adam Masterson		
2004	23 June	Red Hot Chili Peppers	By the Way Tour	James Brown and Chicks On Speed		
2005	22 January	Eric Clapton	Tsunami Relief Cardiff	Jools Holland's Rhythm and Blues Orchestra, Badly Drawn Boy, Camera, Charlotte Church, Craig David, Embrace, Feeder, Goldie Lookin' Chain, Katherine Jenkins, Aled Jones, Kelly Jones, Keane, Lemar, Liberty X, Lulu, Manic Street Preachers, Brian McFadden, Raghav, Heather Small and Snow Patrol.	The concert raised £1.25m and 61,000 people attended the event at the stadium. The concert was, at the time, the biggest charity concert held in the United Kingdom since Live Aid in 1985. The main tickets sold out in just 3 days with a further 3,000 tickets issued selling out in 20 minutes.	
2005	29 June	U2	Vertigo Tour	The Killers and Starsailor		
2005	10 July	R.E.M.	Around the Sun Tour	The Zutons, Idlewild, and Jonathan Rice		
2005	10 December	Oasis	Don't Believe the Truth Tour	Foo Fighters, Razorlight, The Coral, The Subways, Nic Armstrong & The Thieves, and Yeti		
2006	21 June	Take That	The Ultimate Tour	Sugababes and Beverley Knight		
2006	25 June	Eagles	Farewell 1 Tour	No support act		
2006	30 July	Madonna	Confessions Tour	Paul Oakenfold		
2006	29 August	The Rolling Stones	A Bigger Bang Tour	The Kooks	48,988 attended the event	
2007	7 July	Rod Stewart	Rockin' In The Round Tour	Pretenders		
2007	19 October	The Police	Reunion Tour	Mr Hudson and the Library, Fiction Plane, and Coco Sumner		
2008	14 June	Bruce Springsteen & E Street Band	Magic Tour	No support act	48,500 attended the event	
2008	19 June	Neil Diamond	2008 World Tour	No support act	26,000 attended the event	
2008	23 August	Madonna	Sticky & Sweet Tour	No support act		
2009	12 June	Oasis	Dig Out Your Soul Tour	Kasabian, The Enemy, Twisted Wheel and The Peth		
2009	16 June	Take That	Take That Present: The Circus Live	James Morrison and Gary Go		
2009	17 June	Take That	Take That Present: The Circus Live	James Morrison and Gary Go		
2009	22 August	U2	U2 360° Tour	Glasvegas and The Hours	U2 played to a record-breaking concert attendance at the stadium of 73,354. A£20M stage, dubbed The Claw, was used for this concert.	
2010	26 June	Paul McCartney	Up and Coming Tour	Manic Street Preachers and The Joy Formidable	This was Paul McCartney's first concert in Wales for 35 years.	
2010	29 September	Shirley Bassey	Welcome to Wales	Katherine Jenkins, Lostprophets, Only Men Aloud! and Shaheen Jafargholi	This concert was held two days before the first match of the 2010 Ryder Cup golf tournament at Celtic Manor Resort in Newport. This event replaced the traditional gala dinner at the beginning of the event. The event was broadcast a day later on the television channel Sky2 with a programme title of "The Ryder Cup Concert".	
2011	14 June	Take That	Progress Live	Pet Shop Boys	Over 50,000 tickets were sold out within three hours of going on sale	
2011	15 June	Take That	Progress Live	Pet Shop Boys	Over 50,000 tickets were sold out within three hours of going on sale	
2011	8 October	Beyoncé (on a live video link), Christina Aguilera and Cee Lo Green	Michael Forever – The Tribute Concert	Jackson Brothers, Alexandra Burke, Yolanda Adams, 3T, Alien Ant Farm, Pixie Lott, Diversity, Craig David, JLS, Ne-Yo, Jamie Foxx, Gladys Knight, La Toya Jackson, Leona Lewis and Smokey Robinson.	A benefit concert dedicated to Michael Jackson to celebrate the 40th anniversary of his solo career.	
2013	10 June	Rihanna	Diamonds World Tour	David Guetta		
2013	23 July	Bruce Springsteen & E Street Band	Wrecking Ball World Tour	No support act		
2015	5 June	One Direction	On the Road Again Tour	McBusted		
2015	6 June	One Direction	On the Road Again Tour	McBusted		
2016	30 June	Beyoncé	The Formation World Tour	DJ Magnum	49,215 people attended the sold out concert.	
2017	3 June	Black Eyed Peas	2017 UEFA Champions League Final	No support act	Black Eyed Peas performed the opening ceremony of the 2017 UEFA Champions League Final.	
2017	21 June	Robbie Williams	The Heavy Entertainment Show Tour	Erasure		
2017	30 June	Justin Bieber	Purpose World Tour	Halsey		
2017	11 July	Coldplay	A Head Full of Dreams Tour	AlunaGeorge and Embrace		
2017	12 July	Coldplay	A Head Full of Dreams Tour	AlunaGeorge and Embrace		
2018	6 June	Beyoncé; Jay-Z	On the Run II Tour	DJ Tom Clugston	39,731 people attended the sold out concert.	
2018	15 June	The Rolling Stones	No Filter Tour	Elbow		
2018	21 June	Ed Sheeran	÷ Tour (Divide Tour)	Anne-Marie	No other act has played at the Stadium on four consecutive nights	
2018	22 June	Ed Sheeran	÷ Tour (Divide Tour)	Anne-Marie	No other act has played at the Stadium on four consecutive nights	
2018	23 June	Ed Sheeran	÷ Tour (Divide Tour)	Anne-Marie	No other act has played at the Stadium on four consecutive nights	
2018	24 June	Ed Sheeran	÷ Tour (Divide Tour)	Anne-Marie	No other act has played at the Stadium on four consecutive nights	
2019	27 May	Spice Girls	Spice World - 2019 UK Tour	Jess Glynne	Spice Girls first tour since 2007.	
2019	8 June	Take That	Greatest Hits Live	Rick Astley		
2019	20 June	P!nk	Beautiful Trauma World Tour	Vance Joy, KidCutUp, Bang Bang Romeo		
2022	26 May	Ed Sheeran	+–=÷x Tour (Mathematics Tour)	Maisie Peters, Dylan	Sheeran said "I've just done a big UK and Ireland stadium tour and this is by far my favourite stadium I've played."	
2022	27 May	Ed Sheeran	+–=÷x Tour (Mathematics Tour)	Maisie Peters, Dylan	Sheeran said "I've just done a big UK and Ireland stadium tour and this is by far my favourite stadium I've played."	
2022	28 May	Ed Sheeran	+–=÷x Tour (Mathematics Tour)	Maisie Peters, Dylan	Sheeran said "I've just done a big UK and Ireland stadium tour and this is by far my favourite stadium I've played."	
2022	17 June	Stereophonics	We’ll Keep A Welcome	Tom Jones, Catfish and the Bottlemen	Rescheduled from 17 and 18 December 2021.	
2022	18 June	Stereophonics	We’ll Keep A Welcome	Tom Jones, Catfish and the Bottlemen	Rescheduled from 17 and 18 December 2021.	
2022	30 June	Rammstein	Europe Stadium Tour	Duo Abélard	Rescheduled from 16 June 2021 due to the COVID-19 pandemic in Wales	
2022	8 October	AJ Tracey	FIM Supercross World Championship – British Grand Prix	No support act		
2023	17 May	Beyoncé	Renaissance World Tour	No support act	52,756 people attended the sold out concert.	
2023	6 June	Coldplay	Music of the Spheres World Tour	CHVRCHΞS, Elana Dara, Hana Lili, Bridgend Male Voice Choir, Kelly Jones (guest)	119,280 people attended the sold out concerts.	
2023	7 June	Coldplay	Music of the Spheres World Tour	CHVRCHΞS, Elana Dara, Hana Lili, Bridgend Male Voice Choir, Kelly Jones (guest)	119,280 people attended the sold out concerts.	
2023	20 June	Harry Styles	Love On Tour	Wet Leg		
2023	21 June	Harry Styles	Love On Tour	Wet Leg		
2024	5 May	Bruce Springsteen & E Street Band	Springsteen and E Street Band 2024 World Tour	No support act		
2024	11 June	P!nk	Summer Carnival	Gayle, KidCutUp, The Script		
2024	18 June	Taylor Swift	The Eras Tour	Paramore		
2024	25 June	Foo Fighters	Everything or Nothing at All Tour	Wet Leg, Himalayas		
2024	9 August	Billy Joel	Billy Joel in Concert	Chris Isaak	Billy Joel's only European tour date in 2024.	
2025	19 June	Chris Brown	Breezy Bowl XX	Bryson Tiller		
2025	23 June	Lana Del Rey	UK and Ireland Tour 2025			
2025	4 July	Oasis	Oasis Live '25 Tour	Richard Ashcroft, Cast	First Oasis Concert since V Festival in Weston Park, Staffordshire on 22 August 2009	
2025	5 July	Oasis	Oasis Live '25 Tour	Richard Ashcroft, Cast	First Oasis Concert since V Festival in Weston Park, Staffordshire on 22 August 2009	
2025	11 July	Stereophonics	Stadium Anthem Summer '25 Tour	Blossoms		
2025	12 July	Stereophonics	Stadium Anthem Summer '25 Tour	Blossoms		
2025	19 July	Kendrick Lamar; SZA	Grand National Tour	Mustard		
2025	1 August	Catfish and the Bottlemen	Catfish and the Bottlemen: Stadiums 2025	Travis, DMA's	This will be the band's first ever headline stadium concert. They will play at the Tottenham Hotspur Stadium in London two days later.	
2026	16 June	Take That	The Circus Live – Summer 2026	The Script, Belinda Carlisle		
2026	28 June	Metallica	M72 World Tour	Gojira, Knocked Loose		
Cancelled concerts
Year	Day/month	Headline artist	Name of concert or tour	Supporting artists	Reason for cancellation	Ref(s)
2001	27 October	Coldplay	FarmAid 2001	Reef and Toploader.	The concert was organised by Michael Eavis instead of the 2001 Glastonbury Festival. It was arranged as a 2001 foot-and-mouth benefit concert to aid farmers. Eavis had already decided to cancel the Glastonbury Festival in 2001 due to security problems at the festival the year before. It was cancelled "Due to the horrendous events (the September 11 attacks) in America".	
2006	28 January	The Strokes	One Earth Concert	Manic Street Preachers, The Darkness, Super Furry Animals, Elbow and Embrace.	The organisers of the event, Climate Change Now, but did not provide a reason why the event had been postponed, but did say "We apologise wholeheartedly for any inconvenience caused by the change of date...but we can assure those who have already purchased tickets that the event will still take place at the Millennium Stadium." The event never did take place.	
2008	25 August	R.E.M.	European Tour 2008	Editors and Guillemots	Due to poor ticket sales, the concert was transferred to Cardiff International Arena.	
2016	16 June	Rihanna	Anti World Tour	The Weeknd and Big Sean	Logistical reasons.	
2020	14 June	Rammstein	Europe Stadium Tour		Cancelled due to the COVID-19 pandemic in Wales. Rescheduled to 16 June 2021	
2021	16 June	Rammstein	Europe Stadium Tour		Cancelled due to the COVID-19 pandemic in Wales. Rescheduled to 30 June 2022	
2021	17 December	Stereophonics	We’ll Keep A Welcome	Tom Jones, Catfish and the Bottlemen	Cancelled due to concerns around the Omicron variant of COVID. Rescheduled to 17 and 18 June 2022	
2021	18 December	Stereophonics	We’ll Keep A Welcome	Tom Jones, Catfish and the Bottlemen	Cancelled due to concerns around the Omicron variant of COVID. Rescheduled to 17 and 18 June 2022	

== See also ==
- Music of Cardiff
- List of events held at the Millennium Stadium
- List of concerts at the National Stadium, Cardiff Arms Park
- List of highest-grossing concert tours
