= List of events held at the Millennium Stadium =

This is a list of events that have been held at the Millennium Stadium in Cardiff, Wales:

== Association football ==
=== UEFA Champions League final ===
- 2017 UEFA Champions League Final

=== Football at the Olympic Games ===
- 2012 Summer Olympics (Football Men's Quarter Final)
- 2012 Summer Olympics (Football Women's Quarter Final)

=== FA Community Shield matches ===
- 2001 FA Charity Shield
- 2002 FA Community Shield
- 2003 FA Community Shield
- 2004 FA Community Shield
- 2005 FA Community Shield
- 2006 FA Community Shield
- 2026 FA Community Shield

=== FA Cup finals ===
- 2001 FA Cup Final
- 2002 FA Cup Final
- 2003 FA Cup Final
- 2004 FA Cup Final
- 2005 FA Cup Final
- 2006 FA Cup Final

=== Football League Cup finals ===
- 2001 Football League Cup Final
- 2002 Football League Cup Final
- 2003 Football League Cup Final
- 2004 Football League Cup Final
- 2005 Football League Cup Final
- 2006 Football League Cup Final
- 2007 Football League Cup Final

=== Football League Trophy finals ===
- 2001 Football League Trophy Final
- 2002 Football League Trophy Final
- 2003 Football League Trophy Final
- 2004 Football League Trophy Final
- 2005 Football League Trophy Final
- 2006 Football League Trophy Final
- 2007 Football League Trophy Final

=== English Football League play-off finals ===
- 2001 Football League First Division play-off final
- 2001 Football League Second Division play-off final
- 2001 Football League Third Division play-off final
- 2002 Football League First Division play-off final
- 2002 Football League Second Division play-off final
- 2002 Football League Third Division play-off final
- 2003 Football League First Division play-off final
- 2003 Football League Second Division play-off final
- 2003 Football League Third Division play-off final
- 2004 Football League First Division play-off final
- 2004 Football League Second Division play-off final
- 2004 Football League Third Division play-off final
- 2005 Football League Championship play-off final
- 2005 Football League One play-off final
- 2005 Football League Two play-off final
- 2006 Football League Championship play-off final
- 2006 Football League One play-off final
- 2006 Football League Two play-off final

== Boxing ==
- Matt Skelton vs Danny Williams
- Joe Calzaghe vs Peter Manfredo
- Joe Calzaghe vs. Mikkel Kessler
- Anthony Joshua vs. Carlos Takam
- Anthony Joshua vs. Joseph Parker
- Tyson Fury vs Anthony Joshua

== Rallying ==
- 2005 Wales Rally GB-Millennium Stadium Super Special Stage
- 2006 Wales Rally GB-Millennium Stadium Super Special Stage
- 2007 Wales Rally GB-Millennium Stadium Super Special Stage
- 2008 Wales Rally GB-Millennium Stadium Super Special Stage

== Rugby League ==
=== Rugby League World Cup ===
- 2000 Rugby League World Cup (two group games)
- 2013 Rugby League World Cup (opening Ceremony and two group games)

=== Tours ===
- 2002 New Zealand rugby league tour (Wales test match)

=== Rugby League Challenge Cup finals ===
- 2003 Challenge Cup Final
- 2004 Challenge Cup Final
- 2005 Challenge Cup Final

=== Magic Weekends ===
- 2007 Magic Weekend
- 2008 Magic Weekend
- 2011 Magic Weekend

== Rugby Union ==
=== Rugby World Cup finals and quarter-finals ===
- 1999 Rugby World Cup Final
- 2007 Rugby World Cup Quarter-final
- 2015 Rugby World Cup quarter-finals

=== Six Nations Championship ===
- 2000-date Six Nations Championship

=== Heineken Cup finals ===
- 2002 Heineken Cup Final
- 2006 Heineken Cup Final
- 2008 Heineken Cup Final
- 2011 Heineken Cup Final
- 2025 Champions Cup Final

=== Judgement Day ===
- 2013-19, 2023, 2025 Judgement Day

=== WRU Challenge Cup ===
- 2000-2019 WRU Challenge Cup finals

== Speedway ==
=== Speedway Grand Prix of Great Britain ===
- 2001 Speedway Grand Prix of Great Britain
- 2002 Speedway Grand Prix of Great Britain
- 2003 Speedway Grand Prix of Great Britain
- 2004 Speedway Grand Prix of Great Britain
- 2005 Speedway Grand Prix of Great Britain
- 2006 Speedway Grand Prix of Great Britain
- 2007 Speedway Grand Prix of Great Britain
- 2008 Speedway Grand Prix of Great Britain
- 2009 Speedway Grand Prix of Great Britain
- 2010 Speedway Grand Prix of Great Britain
- 2011 Speedway Grand Prix of Great Britain
- 2012 Speedway Grand Prix of Great Britain
- 2013 Speedway Grand Prix of Great Britain
- 2014 Speedway Grand Prix of Great Britain
- 2015 Speedway Grand Prix of Great Britain
- 2016 Speedway Grand Prix of Great Britain
- 2017 Speedway Grand Prix of Great Britain
- 2018 Speedway Grand Prix of Great Britain
- 2019 Speedway Grand Prix of Great Britain

== Other sporting events ==
- 2002 Power Cricket Cup
- Express Eventing International Cup
- Monster Jam European Tour (2007, 2008, 2009, 2010, 2016, 2018, 2019, 2024)
- WWE Clash at the Castle (2022)

== Concerts ==
- Michael Forever – The Tribute Concert
- Tsunami Relief Cardiff
- Welcome to Wales
