= Millennium Stadium Charitable Trust =

UK charitable organisation

- Ymddiriedolaeth Elusennol Stadiwm y Mileniwm
- Founded: 8 February 2001
- Type: Charitable trust
- Headquarters: 4 Bessemer Road
- Location: Cardiff
- Region served: Wales
- Official language: English and Welsh
- Website: www.millenniumstadiumtrust.org.uk

The Millennium Stadium Charitable Trust (Welsh: Ymddiriedolaeth Elusennol Stadiwm y Mileniwm) is a charitable trust based in Wales, which was established 8 February 2001 and is registered with the Charity Commission. The Trust was established between the Millennium Stadium plc and the Millennium Commission when the Millennium Stadium was built in 1999.

== Activities ==
The Trust assesses any application it receives against the following criteria: quality of life, knowledge and need, passion and value, leaving a legacy, life exchanges and working with disadvantaged people.

The Trust only supports applications from non-profit making organisations, voluntary organisations, charitable organisations, voluntary groups working alongside local authorities. Priority however is given to organisations working in disadvantaged communities and to youth programmes in sport, arts, the environment and the community. Local, regional and national organisations can apply for funding, and they can receive up to £2,000, £10,000 and £20,000 respectively.

The Trust does not support any project outside Wales, any operating costs of a project, projects for third party organisations, any requests for payment of debts, retrospective requests for grants, requests from individuals, profit making organisations or requests made solely by local authorities.

== Revenue and grants ==
The predecessor trust was established in July 1996, to support local charitable activities in Wales and it received 10% of distributable profit from Millennium Stadium plc. The trust became the Millennium Stadium Charitable Trust on 8 February 2001, and its income also comes from a levy of £0.25 or 1%, whichever is greater, paid on every ticket that is sold at public events held at the Millennium Stadium. On 22 June 2007, the Chairman of the Millennium Stadium Charitable Trust, Tom Jones announced, "The Trust has now been able to distribute £2 million to more than 500 individual projects".
