= Michael Forever – The Tribute Concert =

2011 concert

Michael Forever - The Tribute Concert.
- Genre: Benefit concert
- Dates: Saturday 8 October 2011
- Locations: Millennium Stadium in Cardiff, Wales, United Kingdom
- Years active: 2011
- Founders: Katherine Jackson
- Website: www.michaelforevertribute.com

Michael Forever – The Tribute Concert was a music benefit concert which was held on 8 October 2011 at the 74,500 seater Millennium Stadium in Cardiff, the capital of Wales.

The concert was dedicated to American entertainer Michael Jackson, who died on 25 June 2009 after suffering a cardiac arrest, and celebrated the 40th anniversary of his solo career. The concert helped to raise awareness and funds for AIDS Project Los Angeles and The Prince's Trust.

== Background ==
The event was already in "advanced stages" in April 2011, when it was presented to the majority of the Jackson family. Katherine Jackson said "Michael gave his entire life to the world through his love, his music and his devotion to healing the planet. I am positive that this event will be an event great enough in scale, talent and imagination to form a worthy celebration of Michael's life."

== Production and broadcasters ==
The concert was organised by Global Live Events LLP, formed by film producers Michael Henry and CEO Chris Hunt, and US CEO Eric Bute.

It was expected that the concert would be broadcast throughout the world to 30 countries in 2D and 3D formats. However, this was later cancelled due to copyright issues.

== Ticket pricing and ticket sales ==
Tickets were priced from £55. Standard seats cost £87, with a restricted view at £55. Standard middle and upper-tier tickets cost £175 and £137 respectively and the more restricted standing tickets were sold at £97. The best seats in the middle tier were priced at £240 each, while the best standing tickets cost £195. Student tickets were available from £25.

Chris Hunt of Global Live Events confirmed before the event that the stadium's capacity had been reduced down from 75,000 to 50,000, with only 40,000 tickets having been sold. Cardiff Council also confirmed that some council staff and councillors were sent e-mails by the Millennium Stadium offering them "a number of free tickets" to the event. A Cardiff Council spokesperson confirmed that they did not know how many free tickets were available, but they were not offered to all council staff.

== Support ==
The event was organised by Global Live Events and had the support of Jackson's mother Katherine Jackson, his sister La Toya and his brothers Tito, Marlon and Jackie, but not that of his other brothers Randy and Jermaine, his other sister Janet, several relatives, the official Michael Jackson Fan Club or even the singer's executors, as they claimed the concert would distract from the involuntary manslaughter trial of Dr. Conrad Murray, Jackson's former doctor. Randy and Jermaine issued the following statement in opposition to the event:

While we wholeheartedly support the spirit of a tribute that honours our brother, we find it impossible to support an event that is due to take place during the criminal trial surrounding Michael's death. As everyone knows, those proceedings commence 20 September, and this Michael Forever concert takes place in Cardiff, Wales, on 8 October. In light of this, we feel it is inappropriate to be involved with such an ill-timed event and its promoter, Global Live. Furthermore, the decision to proceed with this concert disrespects opinions and wishes expressed in the strongest terms to Global Live during conversations in April when this event was presented to the majority of the family as an idea already in its advanced stages. There will come a time and place for an amazing and deserving tribute to Michael. But we feel that the most important tribute we can give to our brother at this time is to seek justice in his name.

The Michael Jackson Fan Club agreed with the two brothers, issuing a similar statement:

"We share their concerns that this concert is taking place at a most inappropriate time when everyone's care and attention should be focused on the matter of justice. We believe that, as stated by Jermaine and Randy, the most important tribute we can give to Michael Jackson at this time is to seek justice in his name."

== Performing acts ==
Musical acts who participated in the event included the Jackson Brothers, Christina Aguilera, Beyoncé, Alexandra Burke, Yolanda Adams, 3T, Alien Ant Farm, Cee Lo Green, Pixie Lott, Diversity, Craig David, JLS, Ne-Yo, Jamie Foxx, Gladys Knight, La Toya Jackson, Leona Lewis and Smokey Robinson. The BBC Radio 1 presenter Fearne Cotton co-hosted the event with Jamie Foxx. Frank Gatson Jr & Chris Grant staged and choreographed Dance Jam and La Toya Jackson numbers.

In the days running up to the event, three of the acts originally booked to perform pulled out: The Black Eyed Peas, due to "unforeseeable circumstances", which led to speculation in the media that the band were splitting up; Chris Brown, who failed to enter the country for the event as his working visa was denied over the assault of former girlfriend Rihanna; and Jennifer Hudson, due to "production issues". Kiss was also removed from the lineup after bass guitarist Gene Simmons made some hurtful comments against Jackson based on the child molestation allegations.

=== Setlist ===
1. Billie Jean
2. The Lady in My Life - Ne-Yo
3. The Way You Make Me Feel - JLS
4. Blame It on the Boogie - JLS & The Jacksons
5. Shake Your Body (Down to the Ground) - The Jacksons
6. Rock with You - Jamie Foxx
7. Smooth Criminal
8. P.Y.T. (Pretty Young Thing) - Alien Ant Farm
9. Stranger in Moscow
10. I'll Be There - Leona Lewis
11. Human Nature - Craig David
12. Can You Feel It/Show You the Way to Go/Smooth Criminal/Dangerous/Thriller - Dance Jam Choreographed & Staged by Frank Gatson Jr. & Chris Grant
13. She's Out of My Life - Smokey Robinson
14. Believe in Yourself - Gladys Knight
15. I Wanna Be Where You Are - Beyoncé (On Video Screen)
16. I Just Can't Stop Loving You - Gladys Knight & Smokey Robinson
17. Why/Heartbreak Hotel - 3T & Tito Jackson
18. Jam/Black or White/Remember the Time/Behind the Mask - Diversity
19. In the Closet/Jam - La Toya Jackson
20. I Can't Help It
21. You Can't Win - Cee Lo Green
22. Smile
23. Dirty Diana - Christina Aguilera
24. I Want You Back
25. You Are Not Alone - Pixie Lott
26. Earth Song - Yolanda Adams
27. Another Part of Me - Yolanda Adams
28. Who's Loving You
29. Scream - Alexandra Burke
30. Leave Me Alone
31. Gone Too Soon - Jennifer Hudson
32. Don't Stop 'Til You Get Enough - Jamie Foxx, JLS & The Jacksons

== Aftermath of the event ==
Global Live Events LLP, which had been formed on 29 March 2011 by film producers Michael Henry and Chris Hunt went into administration on the day of the concert, when both Henry and Hunt both quit the partnership. Both men, Global Live Events and Hunt's media company Iambic Productions were sued in the High Court by Quickdraw - a private investment fund, over ownership of the recordings of the concert. Quickdraw won the case, with the judge stating that Hunt and Henry were 'the most unreliable of witnesses' and their account to the court was 'wholly unbelievable'. Quickdraw was awarded damages of £5 million and costs of in excess of £700,000

== See also ==
- List of concerts at the Millennium Stadium
- List of awards and nominations received by Michael Jackson
- Philanthropy of Michael Jackson
