= Tsunami Relief Cardiff =

2005 charity music contest in Wales

- Logo for the Tsunami Relief Cardiff Concert
- Genre: Benefit concert
- Dates: 22 January 2005
- Locations: Millennium Stadium in Cardiff, Wales, United Kingdom
- Founders: Paul Sergeant
- Attendance: 66,000

Tsunami Relief Cardiff was a charity music concert held at the Millennium Stadium in Cardiff on 22 January 2005, in aid of the victims of the 2004 Indian Ocean earthquake, which had occurred the month before. The benefit concert raised £1,248,963.

The concert was, at the time, the biggest charity concert in the United Kingdom since Live Aid over 20 years before, and more than 60,000 fans watched live, with many millions more from around the world viewing the seven-hour-long concert. The main tickets sold out in 3 days; when a further 1,000 tickets were issued, they sold in 20 minutes.

== Concert ==
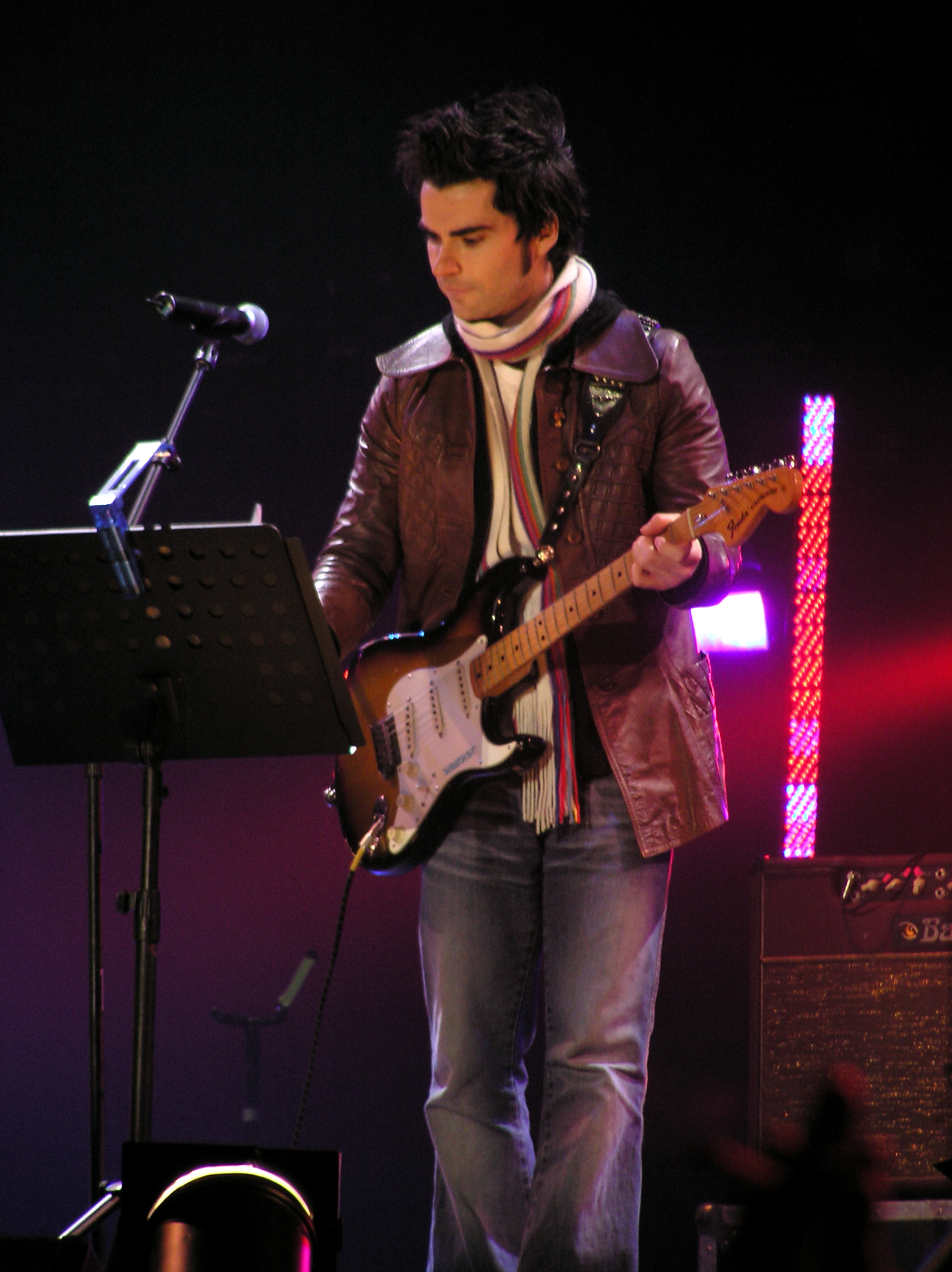
Kelly Jones performing at the concert

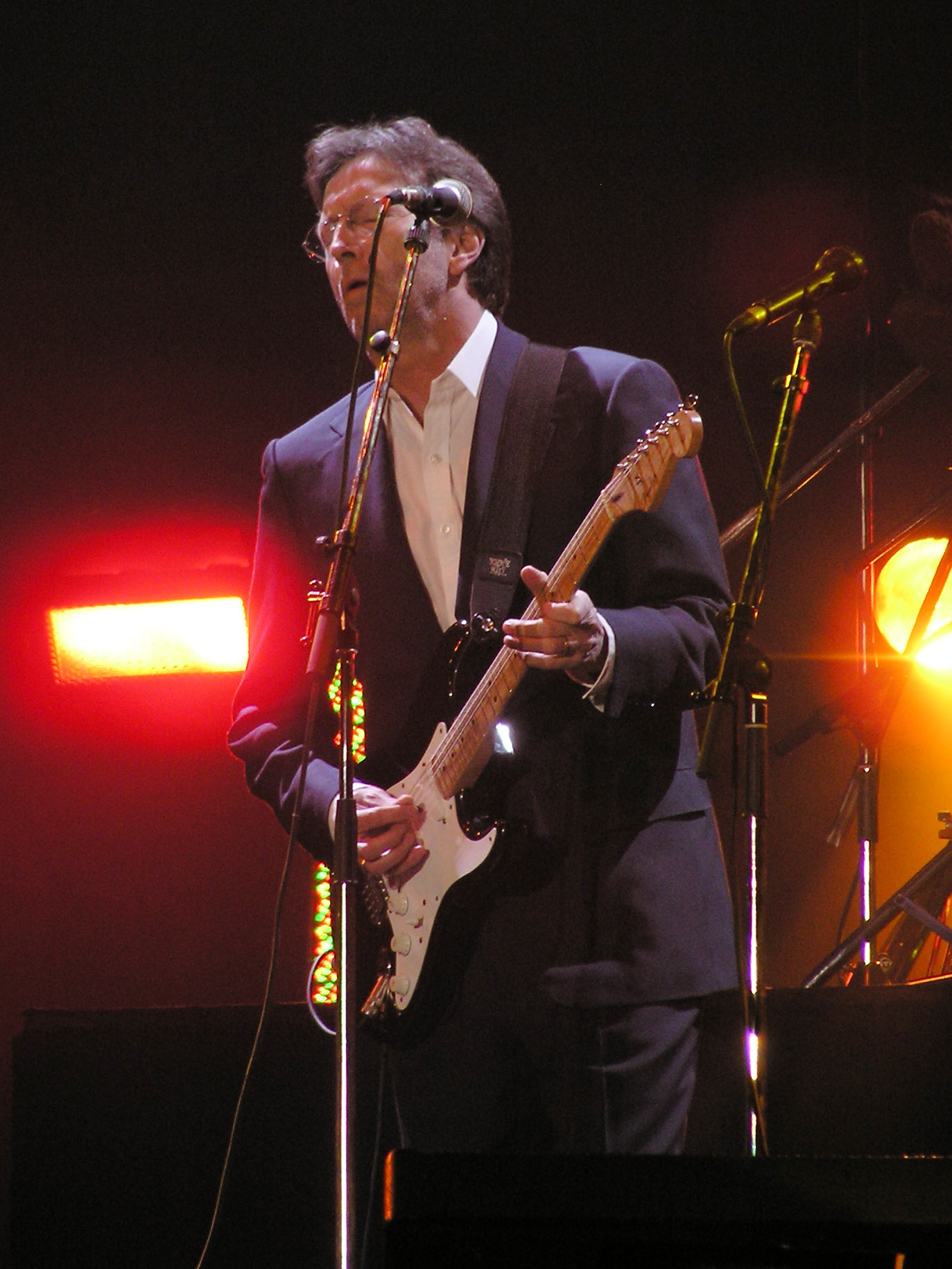
Eric Clapton

The concert featured a range of music styles, with long standing veterans such as Eric Clapton, Jools Holland, Lulu, classical performers in Aled Jones, Charlotte Church and Katherine Jenkins and Welsh rock groups such as Feeder, the Manic Street Preachers and, representing The Stereophonics Kelly Jones contributing. Midge Ure also made a surprise appearance at the concert, who introduced Feeder.

The concert began with little known Wrexham band Camera, but this was not shown on the TV broadcasts. For the television and internet audience, the show was started by classical singer Katherine Jenkins, with "Amazing Grace", "Caruso" and "You'll Never Walk Alone"; the audience waving red LED torches to represent victims of the Asian disaster. The music continued throughout the evening with an electric atmosphere culminating in a sing-a-long finale with Jools Holland and Eric Clapton playing "Shake, Rattle and Roll" accompanied by many of the artists who had performed throughout the day (who all waived their usual fees).

The event was chronicled in the January 2025 BBC Wales documentary film “The Impossible Gig”, which discussed the organisation process and the uncertainty surrounding the event going ahead, which was on the condition an “A-Lister” could be found. This was made difficult due to the short timeframe involved.

A member of the organisation team later happened to come across a contact who knew Eric Clapton, who agreed and soon contacted Jools Holland to accompany him.

== Broadcast ==
The full concert was carried live by BBC Radio Wales and S4C, with BBC Radio 2 and BBC One Wales airing some live coverage and recorded highlights later in the evening. The entire concert was available on UK digital television via the BBC Red Button service as well as being streamed online. Video highlights were available on the BBC's website soon thereafter and a highlights show was also broadcast on BBC Two and Five in the evening.

== Line-up ==
(in alphabetical order)

- Badly Drawn Boy
- Camera (Wrexham band)
- Charlotte Church
- Eric Clapton
- Craig David
- Embrace
- Feeder
- Goldie Lookin' Chain
- Jools Holland
- Katherine Jenkins
- Aled Jones
- Kelly Jones, lead singer of Stereophonics
- Keane
- Lemar
- Liberty X
- Lulu
- Manic Street Preachers
- Brian McFadden
- Raghav
- Heather Small
- Snow Patrol

== See also ==
- List of music concerts at the Millennium Stadium
