= Millennium Stadium =

National stadium of Wales

Principality Stadium Stadiwm Principality

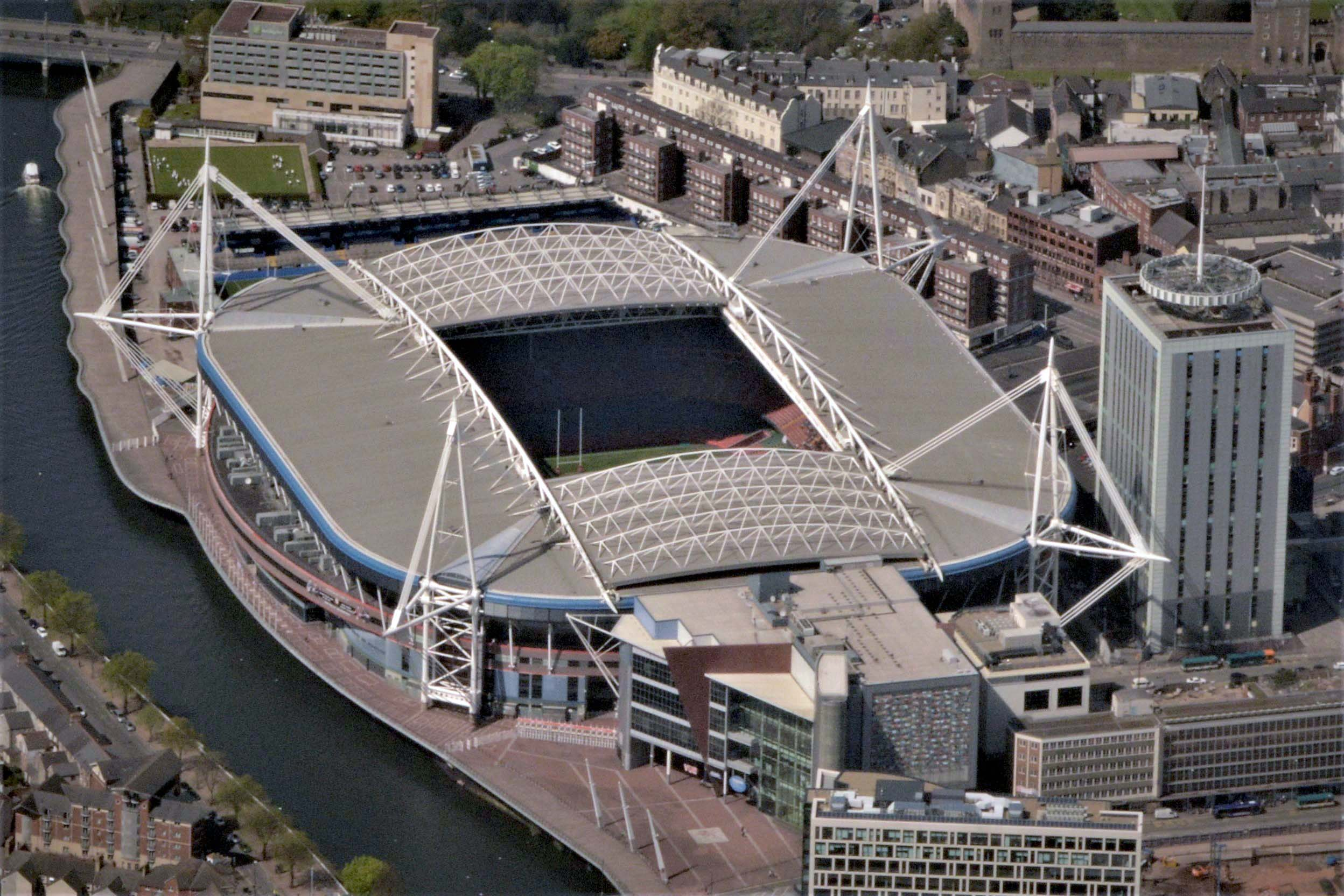
- UEFA
- Interactive map of Principality Stadium; Stadiwm Principality
- Former names: Millennium Stadium; Stadiwm y Mileniwm; National Stadium of Wales (UEFA competitions only); Stadiwm Genedlaethol Cymru
- Location: Westgate Street; Cardiff; CF10 1NS
- Coordinates: 51°28′41″N 3°10′57″W
- Owner: Millennium Stadium plc (Welsh Rugby Union)
- Operator: Millennium Stadium plc (Welsh Rugby Union)
- Capacity: 73,931 (rugby union and football); 78,000 (boxing)
- Executive suites: 124
- Roof: Retractable
- Surface: Grass (1999–2014); GrassMaster (2014–present)
- Record attendance: 76,000 (Metallica; 28 June 2026)
- Field size: 120 m × 79 m (394 ft × 259 ft)
- Public transit: Cardiff Central

Construction
- Groundbreaking: 1997
- Built: 1997–1999
- Opened: 26 June 1999; 27 years ago
- Cost: £114–121 million
- Architect: Bligh Lobb Sports Architecture
- Structural engineer: WS Atkins
- Main contractor: Laing

Tenants
- Wales national rugby union team (1999–present); Wales national football team (2000–2009) (Note: From 2000 to 2009, the Wales national football team played the majority of their home matches at the Millennium Stadium in an agreement with Welsh Rugby Union. Since 2009, Wales have played the majority of their home games at the Cardiff City Stadium, but the Millennium Stadium is still used on occasion.); Speedway Grand Prix of Great Britain (2001–2024)

Website
- www.principalitystadium.wales

The Millennium Stadium (Welsh: Stadiwm y Mileniwm), known since 2016 as the Principality Stadium (Welsh: Stadiwm Principality) for sponsorship reasons, is the national stadium of Wales in Cardiff. It has a retractable roof and a usual capacity of 73,931. It is the home of the Wales national rugby union team. Initially built to host the 1999 Rugby World Cup and replacing the National Stadium on the site known as Cardiff Arms Park, it has hosted other events including the Tsunami Relief Cardiff concert, the Super Special Stage of Wales Rally Great Britain, the Speedway Grand Prix of Great Britain and various concerts. It also hosted FA Cup, League Cup and Football League play-off finals while Wembley Stadium was being redeveloped between 2001 and 2006, as well as football matches during the 2012 Summer Olympics.

The stadium is owned by Millennium Stadium plc, a subsidiary company of the Welsh Rugby Union (WRU). The architects were Bligh Lobb Sports Architecture. The structural engineers were WS Atkins and the building contractor was Laing. The total construction cost of the stadium was £121million, of which the Millennium Commission funded £46 million.

The Millennium Stadium opened in June 1999 and its first major event was an international rugby union match on 26 June 1999, when Wales beat South Africa by 29–19 before a crowd of 29,000. With a total seating capacity of 73,931, it is the largest stadium in Wales and the fourth largest in the United Kingdom by capacity. It is also the fourth largest stadium in the world with a fully retractable roof and was the second stadium in Europe to have this feature. Listed as a category four stadium by UEFA, the stadium was chosen as the venue for the 2017 UEFA Champions League Final, which took place on 3 June 2017 and was won by Real Madrid. In 2015, the Welsh Rugby Union announced a 10-year sponsorship deal with the Principality Building Society that saw the stadium renamed as the "Principality Stadium" from early 2016.

== History ==
=== Background ===
Until 1969, Cardiff RFC and Wales both played their home matches on the same pitch at Cardiff Arms Park, but all this changed in the 1969–70 season. As a result of an agreement between Cardiff Athletic Club and the WRU, the National Stadium project established that a new stadium for international matches and events was required, with Cardiff RFC moving to a new, purpose-built stadium on the original cricket ground at the site of the former Cardiff Arms Park stadium. By 7 April 1984 the National Stadium was officially opened. However, in 1994, a committee was set up to consider redeveloping the National Stadium, and by 1995 the WRU had been chosen to host the 1999 Rugby World Cup.

National Stadium

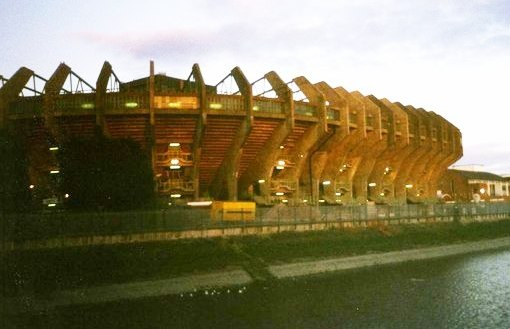
The West Stand of the National Stadium

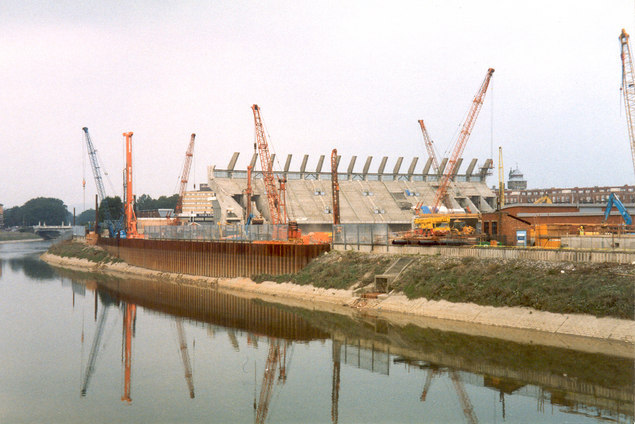
The remaining North Stand of the National Stadium, which would form the North Stand of the Millennium Stadium

In 1995, the National Stadium, which was designed in 1962, only had a capacity of 53,000; other nations' stadia, such as Twickenham (England) with a capacity of 75,000, and Murrayfield Stadium (Scotland) with a capacity of 67,000, had overtaken it. France was also about to build the Stade de France, which would have a capacity of more than 80,000 for the 1998 FIFA World Cup. The original capacity of the National Stadium was 65,000, but this had been reduced to 53,000, due to the Taylor Report. 11,000 of 53,000 capacity was on the East Terrace and the conversion to an all-seater stadium would have reduced the stadium capacity still further to just 47,500.

In addition to the problems of capacity, the National Stadium was also very well hidden by the neighbouring buildings to the south in Park Street, Wood Street and to the east in Westgate Street, and also by Cardiff Rugby Ground in the north. It was only fully visible from across the River Taff in the west. Access to the ground was also very restricted with the main entrance being a narrow opening in Westgate Street to the east which was shared by both vehicles and spectators alike.

The options for the new stadium included adding a third tier to the existing National Stadium, or moving to a new site in Bridgend. This last option was projected to have 100,000 seats and was backed by Bridgend County Borough Council, the leader of which told The Times that idea of building a new national stadium stadium in Cardiff was "half-baked". However, the Bridgend plan was discounted because it would have required a vast car parking facility, and that would have put severe short-term pressures on the local transport infrastructure, creating traffic jams and pollution. The committee eventually chose a new stadium on the same site but with considerable increase in its capacity. It would also involve moving the alignment of the stadium from west–east to north–south. This was the option supported by the Millennium Commission. It would become the fourth redevelopment of the Cardiff Arms Park site. It was also decided that the new stadium should have a sliding roof to accommodate a multi-use venue, with a grass pitch for rugby and football. The only other sliding roofs in Europe at the time were at two Dutch stadia – the Amsterdam Arena, completed in 1996 with a capacity of 50,000; and Gelredome in Arnhem, a 30,000-capacity ground built from 1996 to 1998.

To remain on the Arms Park site, additional space had to be found to allow safe access and to provide room for the increased capacity and improved facilities. This was achieved by the purchase of adjacent buildings to the south and east and by the construction of a new £6 million River Walk by the River Taff on the western side of the stadium.

By 1999, the Millennium Stadium had replaced the National Stadium, Cardiff Arms Park, as the national stadium of Wales for rugby union and association football international matches. Cardiff RFC continued as before to play at Cardiff Arms Park rugby ground, which had replaced the cricket ground in 1969.

=== Construction ===
The Millennium Stadium during construction

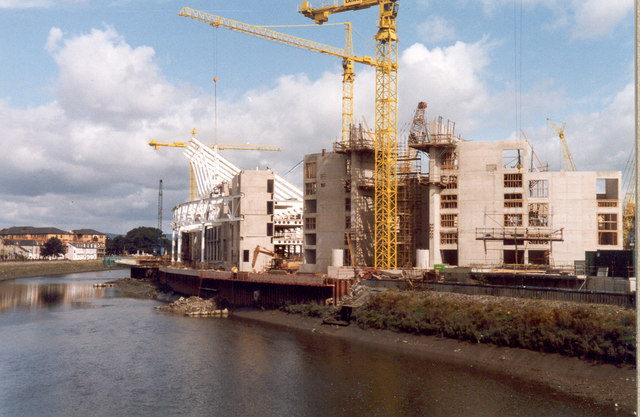
West Stand

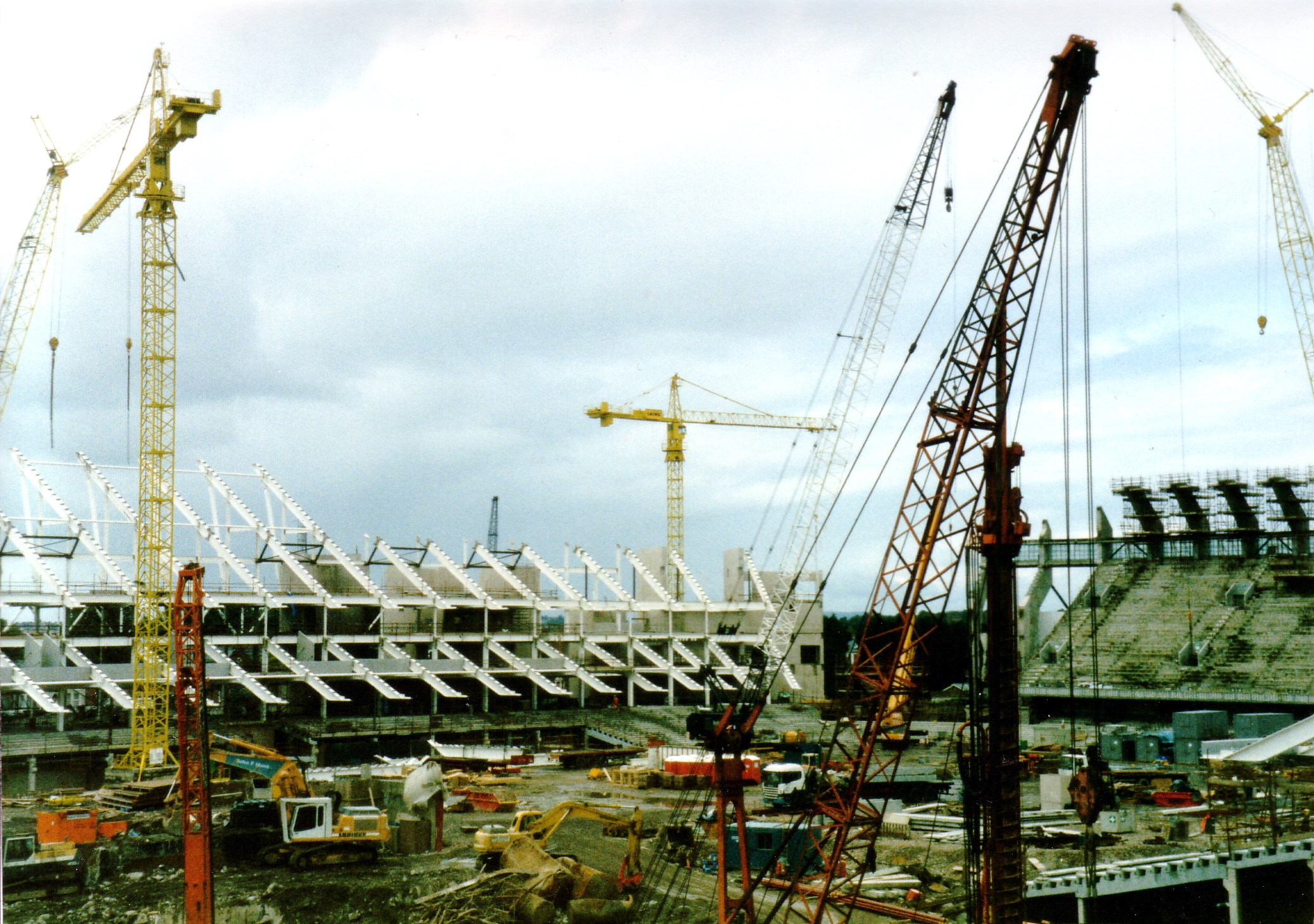
West Stand (left)
and the North Stand (right)

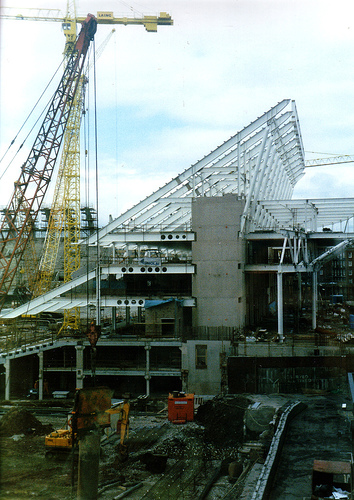
BT Stand

The stadium was designed by a team led by Rod Sheard at Lobb Sport Architecture, who later merged with HOK Sport to become Populous. The building contractor was Laing and the structural engineers were WS Atkins. Mike Otlet of WS Atkins designed the stadium's retractable roof, which was constructed by Kelsey Roofing Industries. Cimolai S.p.A. from Italy fabricated and erected the 72 steel plane frames for the stands and all the 4,500 components of the roof.

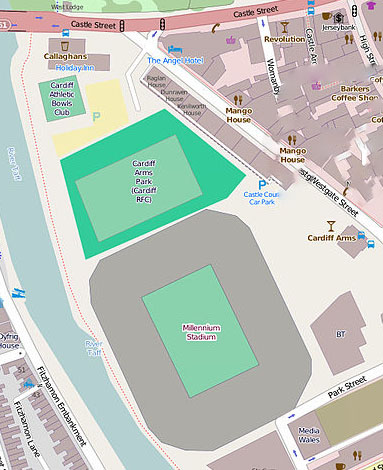
Map of the Millennium Stadium (south ground) and Cardiff Arms Park (north ground)

Construction involved the demolition of a number of buildings, primarily the existing National Stadium (Cardiff Arms Park), Wales Empire Pool (swimming pool) in Wood Street, Cardiff Empire Telephone Exchange building (owned by BT) in Park Street, the newly built Territorial Auxiliary & Volunteer Reserve building in Park Street, and the Social Security offices in Westgate Street.

The stadium was built by Laing in 1999 on the site of the National Stadium, with the head of construction being Steve Ager. It was built for the 1999 Rugby World Cup, for which Wales was the main host, with seven of the 41 matches, including the final, being played at the stadium.

The total construction cost of the stadium was £121 million, which was funded by private investment and £46 million of public funds from the Millennium Commission, the sale of debentures to supporters (which offered guaranteed tickets in exchange for an interest-free loan) and loans. The development left the WRU heavily in debt.

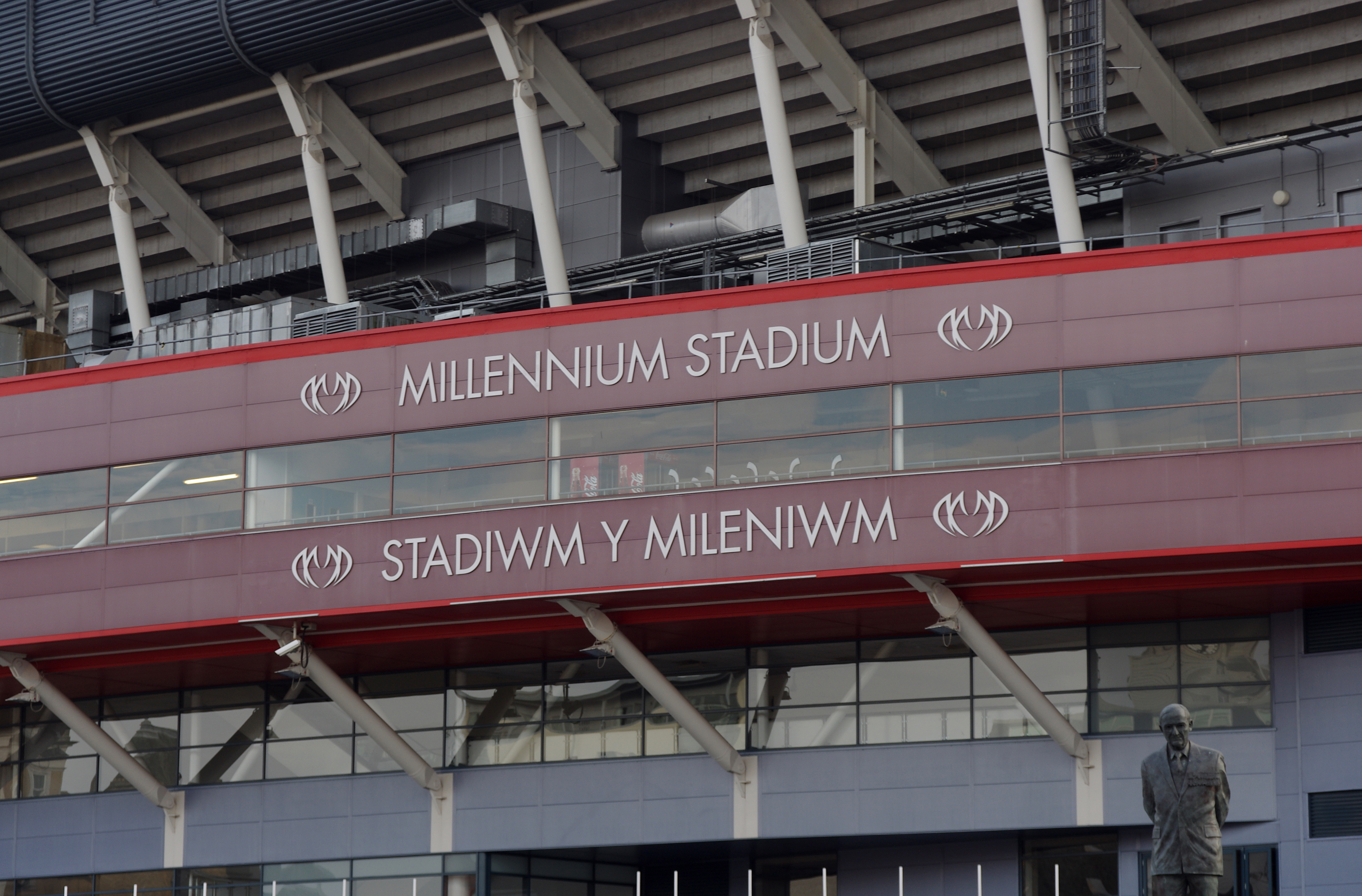
The stadium's previous branding on the exterior of the BT Stand

The Millennium Stadium was named as such in recognition of the Millennium Commission's contribution to the building.

The stadium was first used for a major event on 26 June 1999, when Wales played South Africa in a rugby union test match before a crowd of 29,000. Wales won 29–19: the first time they had ever beaten the Springboks.

=== 2016 renaming ===
On 8 September 2015 it was announced that the Millennium Stadium would be renamed Principality Stadium as the result of a 10-year naming rights deal with the Principality Building Society. Some fans expressed opposition on social media.

On 22 January 2016, the Millennium Stadium was officially renamed as the Principality Stadium. The new name, written bilingually ("Stadiwm Principality Stadium") and covering 114 square metres (1,230 sq ft) of the upper stadium, was lit up at a special evening ceremony, to be followed by a festival to encourage grassroots rugby. The change of name also meant a change of logo for the Millennium Stadium. There were three designs shortlisted, and a panel, which included the former Wales international captain Ryan Jones and staff and members of the WRU and Principality Building Society, chose the final design. A spokesperson for the WRU said: "The new stadium logo takes its inspiration from the venue's iconic architecture; four spires, curved frontage and fully retractable roof."

== Features ==
Panoramic views inside the Millennium Stadium

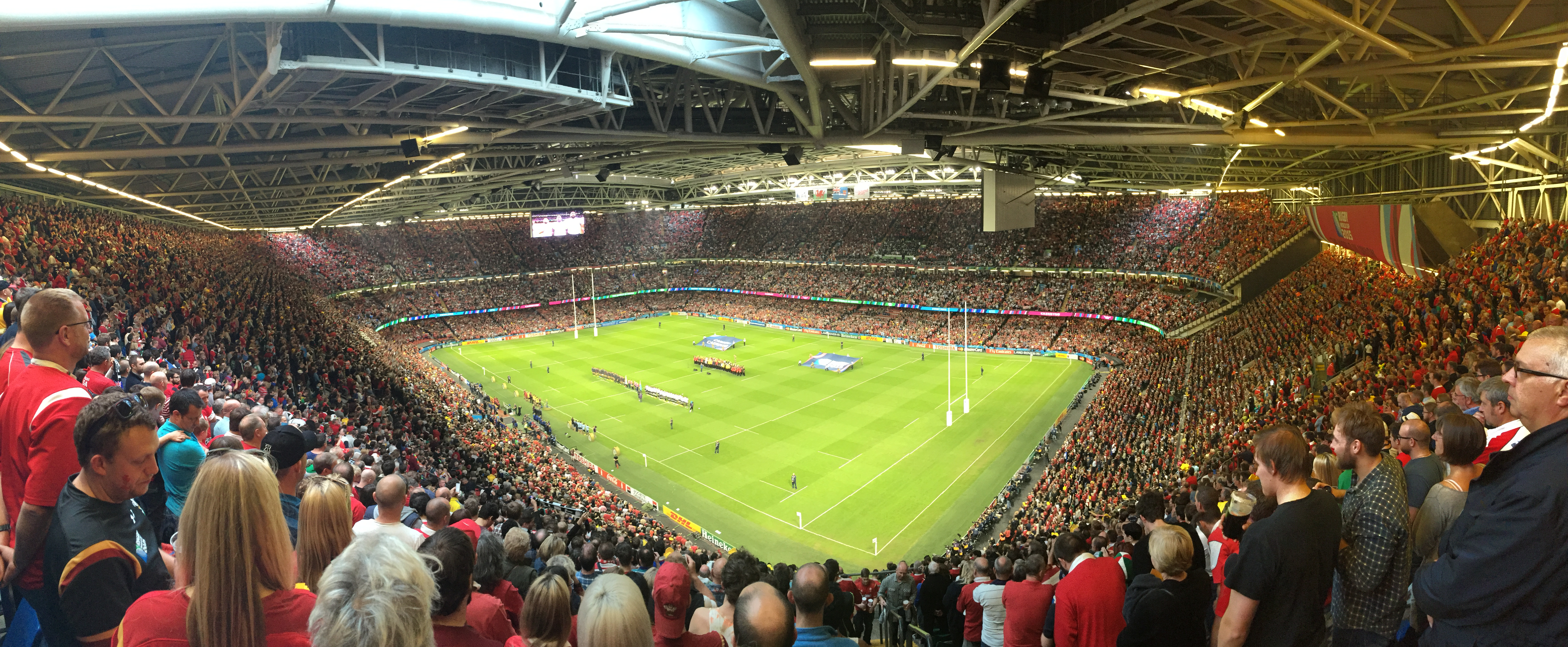
Wales vs Fiji in the 2015 Rugby World Cup

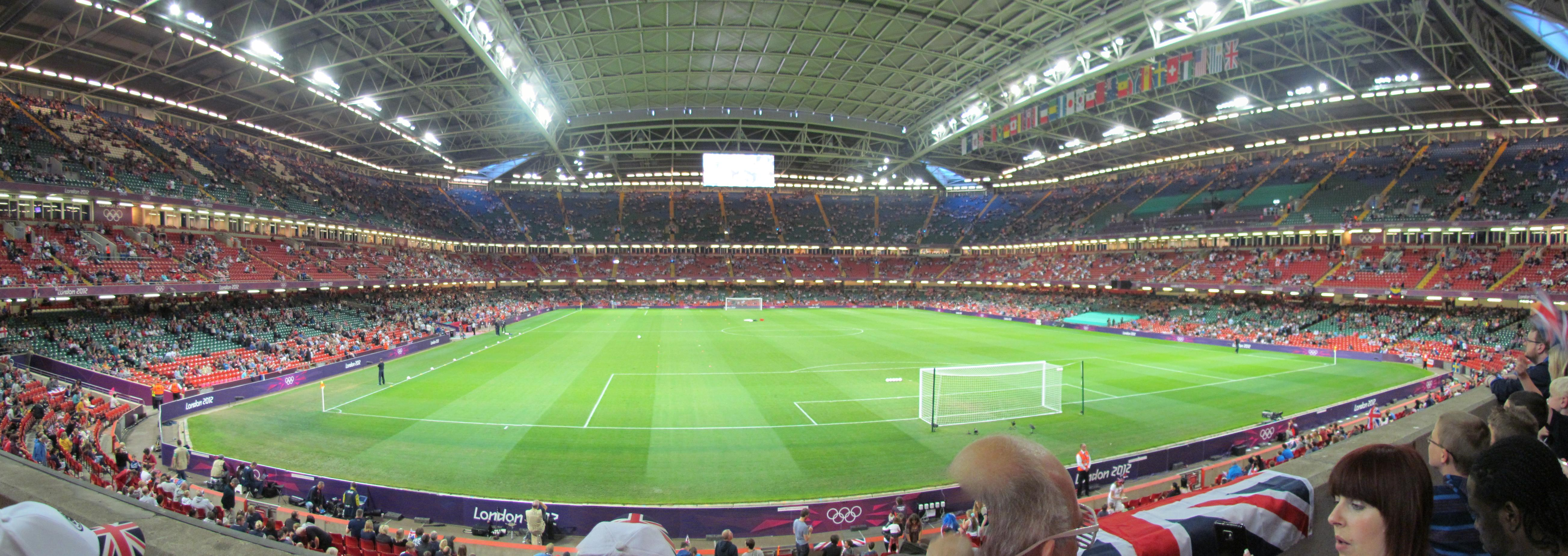
Hosting the Association Football event of the 2012 Summer Olympics

The all-seater stadium has the capacity for 74,500 supporters and features a retractable roof, only the second stadium of its type in Europe. When opened the stadium was the largest stadium with this feature in the world until the opening of the Cowboys Stadium in Arlington, Texas in the United States in 2009. It remained the largest in Europe until the renovations of the Bernabéu in Madrid, Spain were completed in 2024.

Additional seating is sometimes added for special events such as a rugby Test against the New Zealand All Blacks, or for the FA Cup Final. The current record attendance is set at just over 78,000, recorded at the Anthony Joshua v Carlos Takam fight, on 28 October 2017, in which Joshua successfully retained his WBA, IBF and IBO titles.

The natural grass turf was made up of a modular system installed by GreenTech ITM. It features built in irrigation and drainage. The pitch itself was laid on top of some 7,412 pallets that could be moved so the stadium could be used for concerts, exhibitions and other events.

In May 2014, after much trouble with disease and stability, the surface was removed and replaced with a more resilient interwoven sand based Desso pitch.

The four ends of the ground are called the North Stand, the West Stand, the South Stand and the East Stand. The South Stand was previously known as the Hyder Stand, until Hyder was sold while the East stand was called the BT Stand until the stadium was renamed in 2016. The stadium has three tiers of seating with the exception of the North Stand, which has two tiers. The lower tier holds 23,154 spectators, the middle tier holding 15,626 and the upper tier holding 35,151 spectators.

North Stand
Glanmor's Gap – the remaining section of the demolished National Stadium

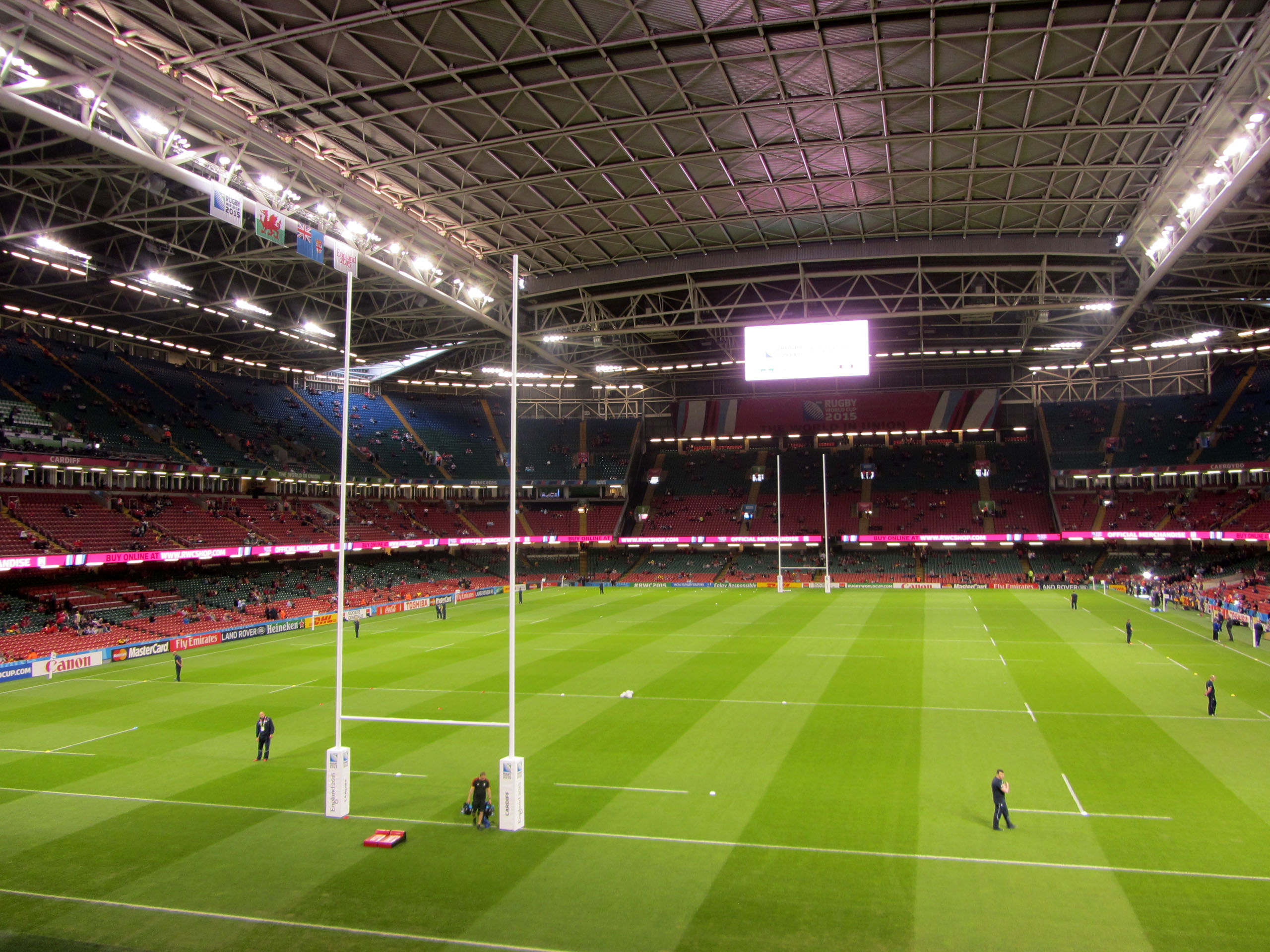
Roof closed
before a rugby union match

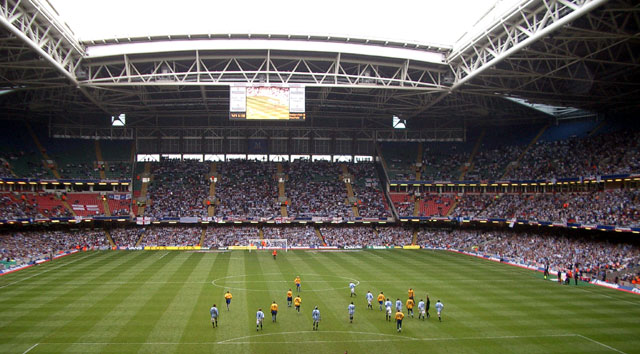
Roof open
before an association football match

The stadium was slightly restricted in size due to its proximity to Cardiff Rugby Club's home in the adjacent smaller stadium within Cardiff Arms Park. The WRU were unable to secure enough funding to include the North Stand in the new stadium and the Millennium Commission would not allow any of its funds to be used in any way for the construction of a new stadium for Cardiff RFC. The WRU held talks with Cardiff RFC to see if it would be possible for the club to either move or secure funding for the Cardiff Arms Park to be re-developed, but these were unsuccessful. The stadium thus had to be completed with a break in its bowl structure in the North Stand, known colloquially as Glanmor's Gap, after Glanmor Griffiths, then chairman of the WRU and now a former president.

The Millennium Stadium's Gates

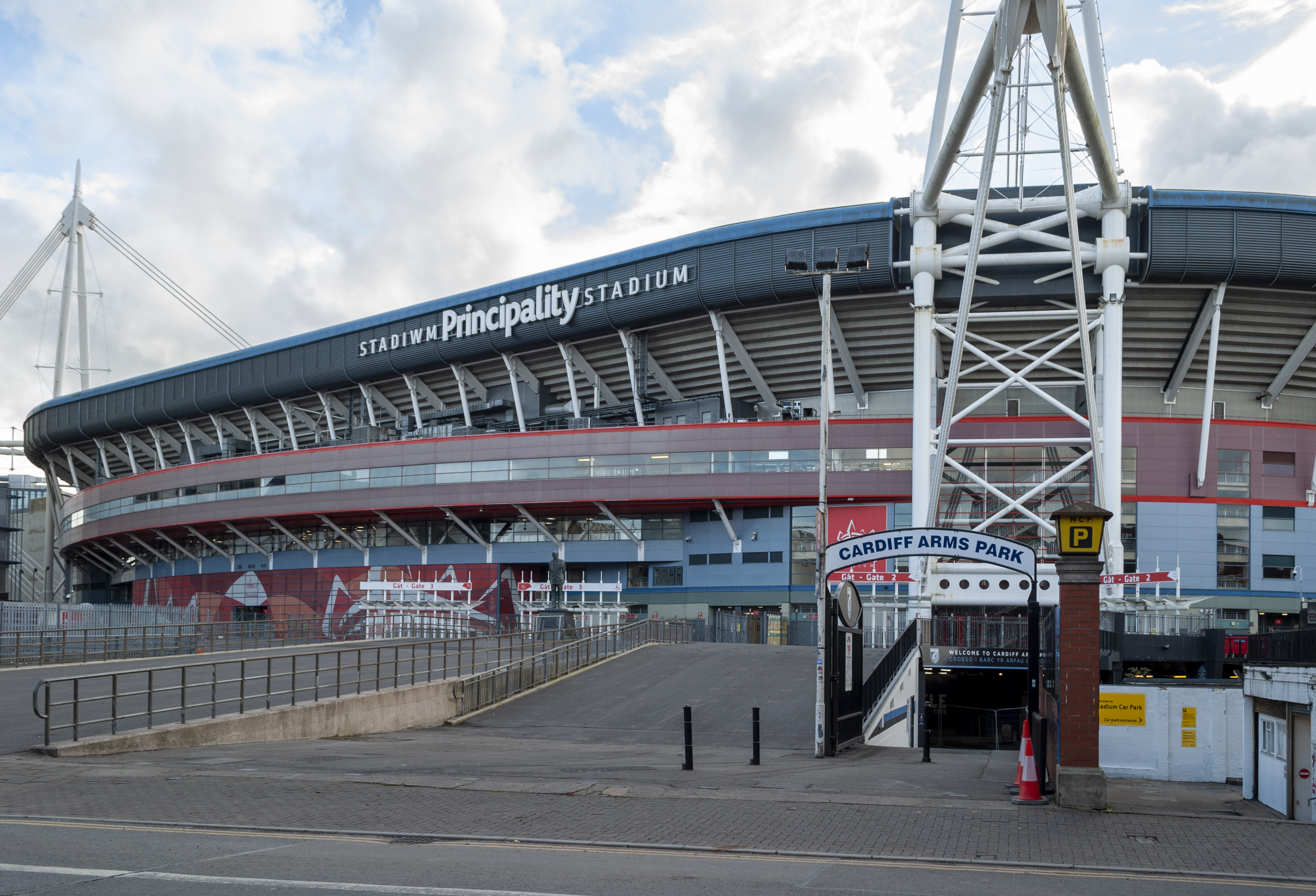
Gates 2 (left) and 3 (right) on Westgate Street

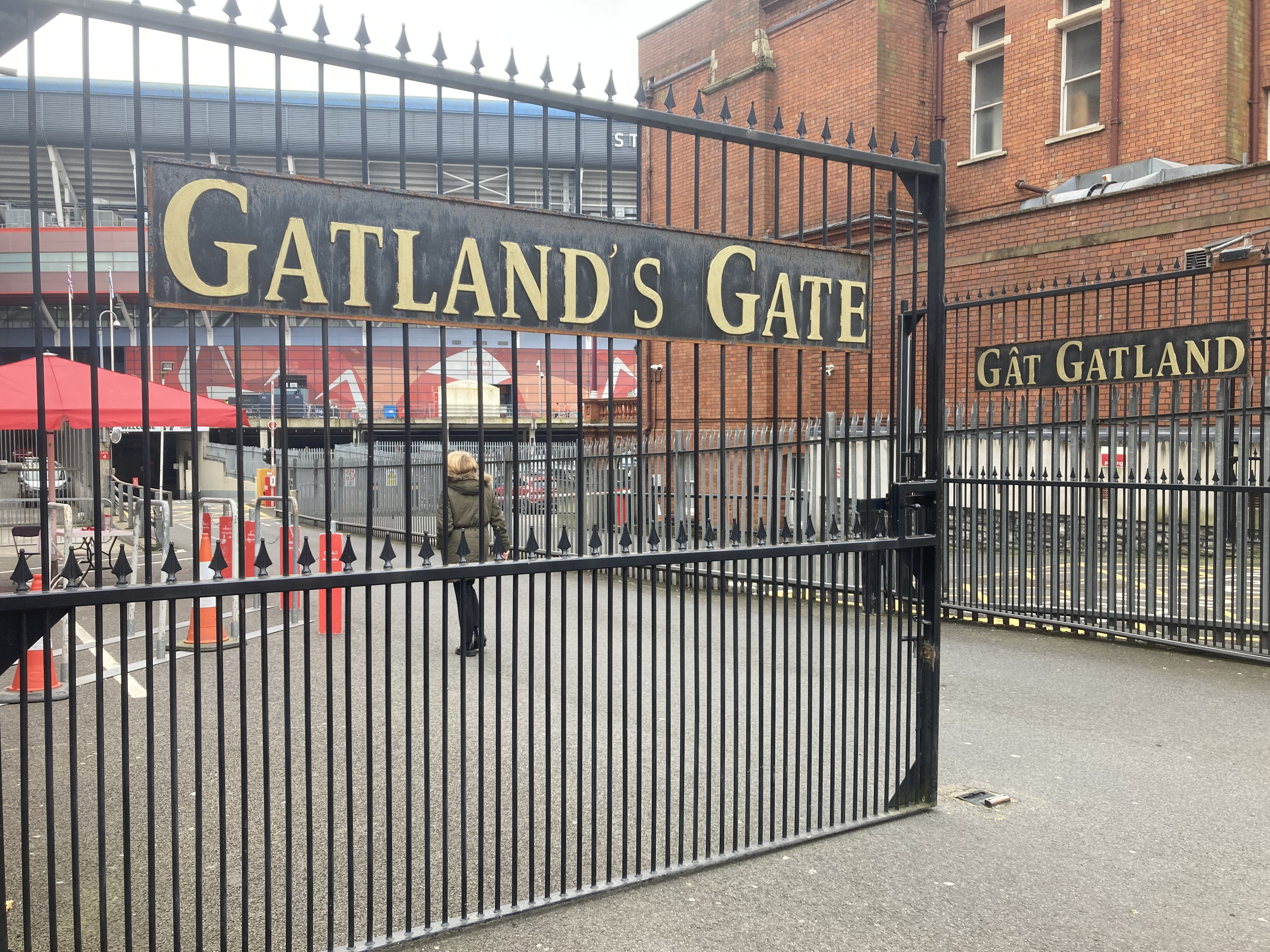
Gatland's Gate, previously known as Gate 4 on Westgate Street.

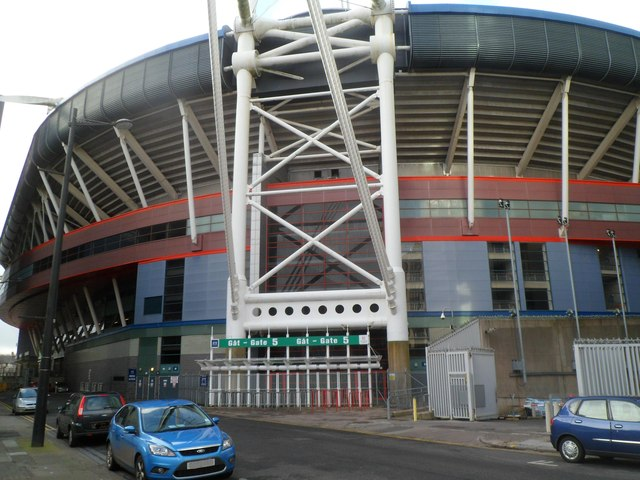
Gate 5 on Park Street.

The superstructure of the stadium is based around four 90.3-metre (296 ft) masts. The stadium was built from 56,000 tonnes of concrete and steel, and has 124 hospitality suites and 7 hospitality lounges, 22 bars, 7 restaurants, 17 first aid points, 12 escalators and 7 lifts. The stadium has 7 gates for access to the site; Gate 1 is from the River Walk via Castle Street (to the north), Gates 2 and 3 are via Westgate Street (to the east), Gate 4 which was renamed Gatland's Gate (Welsh: Gât Gatland) in honour of Warren Gatland in November 2019, is for team-coaches, celebrity limousines and other uses via Westgate Street, Gate 5 is via Park Street (to the south) and Gates 6 and 7 are via the Millennium Plaza (also to the south).

Any future renovation to the stadium will involve replacing the old North Stand of the former National Stadium with a new one similar to the three existing stands of the new Millennium Stadium. This will make the stadium bowl-shaped and will increase its capacity to around 80,000. It will resolve the existing problems of deteriorating concrete quality on the old structure in the north stand. However the WRU has been more resistant to the proposal in recent years, stating that the concrete has not been deteriorating in recent years meaning the cost of replacing Glanmor's Gap would not justify the limited increase in capacity it would provide.

In each of the stadium's bars, so-called "joy machines" can pour 12 pints in less than 20 seconds. During a Wales versus France match, 63,000 fans drank 77,184 pints of beer, almost double the 44,000 pints drunk by a similar number of fans at a game at Twickenham. The stadium has a resident hawk named "Dad", who is employed to drive seagulls and pigeons out of the stadium.

In 2005 the stadium installed an "Arena Partition Drape System" – a 1,100 kg (2,400 lb) black curtain made up of 12 drapes measuring 9 m × 35 m (30 ft × 115 ft) – to vary the audience from a capacity of over 73,000 down to between 12,000 and 46,000, depending on the four different positions that it can be hung. The curtains can be stored in the roof of the stadium when not in use. The £1 million cost of the curtain was funded by the stadium, the Millennium Commission, its caterers Letherby and Christopher (Compass Group) and by the then Wales Tourist Board. The curtain was supplied by Blackout.

In May 2015, the chairman of the WRU, Gareth Davies, announced that the stadium would be fitted with new seats, replacing the original seats from 1999 at a cost of £4 million to £5 million, which would be completed by 2018. In addition a new £3.1 million Desso hybrid pitch will be installed.

In February 2019, the stadium increased its disabled capacity from 168 to 214 at a cost of around £100,000. As a result, the overall capacity of the stadium was reduced from 74,500 to 73,931.

=== Statue of Sir Tasker Watkins ===
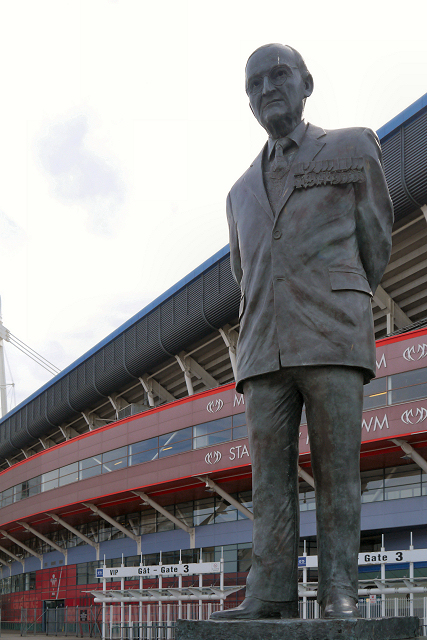
Statue of Sir Tasker Watkins

A statue of Sir Tasker Watkins, the former WRU president between 1993 and 2004, was commissioned to stand outside Gate 3 of the stadium. The bronze statue, 9 feet (2.7 m) tall, was sculpted by Llantwit Major based sculptor Roger Andrews. The Welsh Government contributed £50,000, as did Cardiff Council. It was officially unveiled on 15 November 2009 by his daughter, Lady Mair Griffith-Williams.

== Usage ==
As well as international rugby union and association football, the Millennium Stadium has hosted a variety of sports, including, rugby league (including the Challenge Cup Final on three occasions between 2003 and 2005, the opening ceremony of the 2013 Rugby League World Cup and Welsh Rugby League internationals), speedway, boxing, the Wales Rally Great Britain stage of the World Rally Championship, Monster Jam and indoor cricket. The indoor cricket match between The Brits and a Rest of the World team for the Pertemps Power Cricket Cup, which took place on 4 and 5 October 2002.

=== Rugby union ===
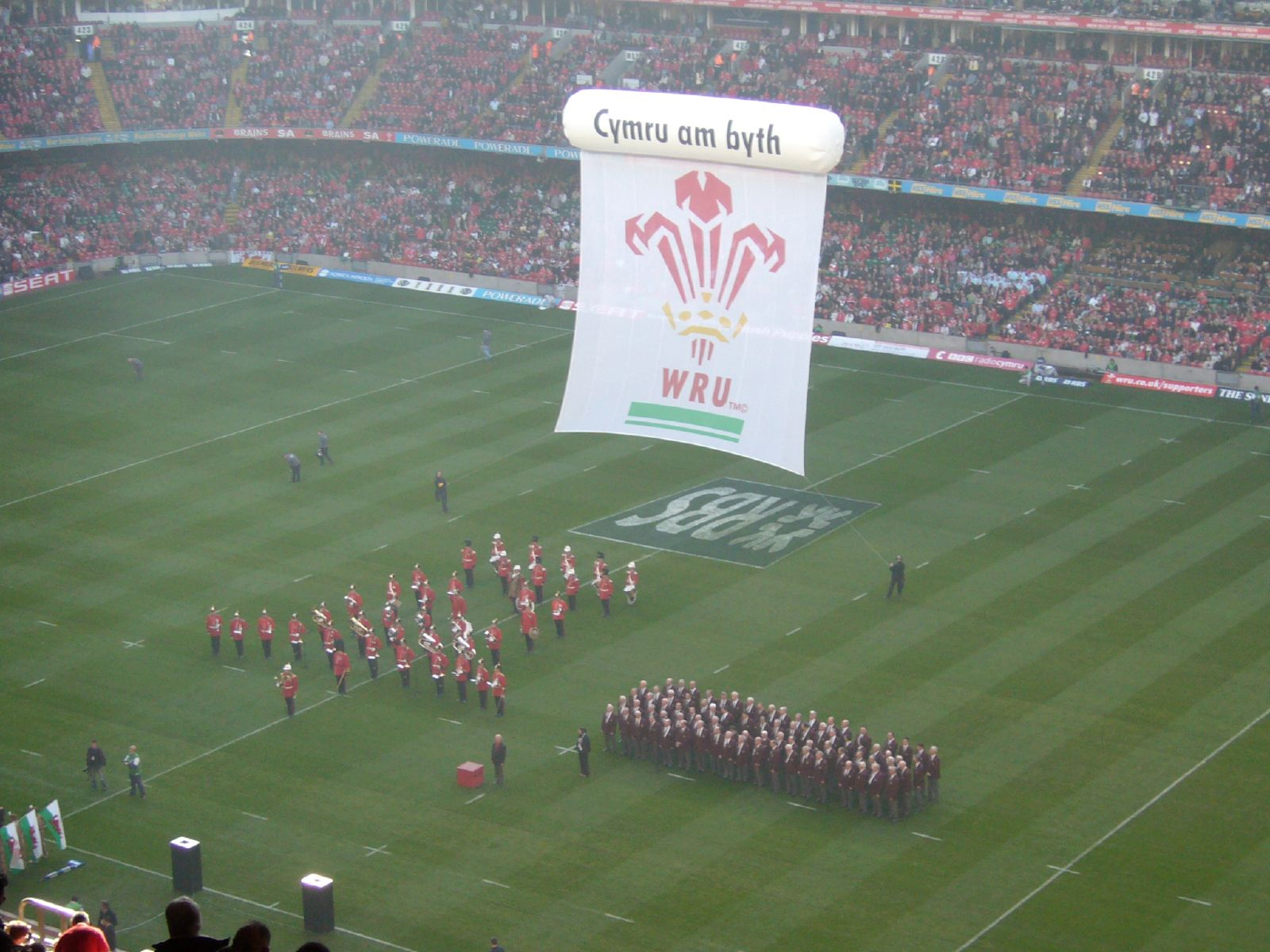
The pre-match entertainment before the Wales and Scotland match in the 2008 Six Nations Championship

The stadium is the home of the Welsh rugby union team, who play all of their home fixtures at the venue. These games include those during the Six Nations, as well as the Autumn Internationals against nations from the Southern Hemisphere. Apart from the national team, the stadium has also hosted the European Rugby Champions Cup finals on six occasions. In total, the site, including the National Stadium, has hosted the final of the European Rugby Champions Cup on eight occasions.

European Rugby Champions Cup finals
| Season | Winners | Score | Runners-up | Attendance |
|---|---|---|---|---|
| 2001–02 | Leicester Tigers (England) | 15–9 | (Ireland) Munster | 74,600 |
| 2005–06 | Munster (Ireland) | 23–19 | (France) Biarritz | 74,534 |
| 2007–08 | Munster (Ireland) | 16–13 | (France) Toulouse | 74,500 |
| 2010–11 | Leinster (Ireland) | 33–22 | (England) Northampton Saints | 72,456 |
| 2013–14 | Toulon (France) | 23–6 | (England) Saracens | 67,586 |
| 2024–25 | Bordeaux Bègles (France) | 28–20 | (England) Northampton Saints | 70,225 |

The stadium has also been used for Celtic League games, and the semi-finals of the Anglo-Welsh Cup in 2006 and 2007. Since 2013, the Millennium Stadium has hosted Judgement Day, a double-header between the four Welsh United Rugby Championship teams. The 2016 edition had 68,262 spectators, the highest in the history of the league.

The stadium hosted the first match in the 2005 British & Irish Lions tour to New Zealand when they drew 25–25 against Argentina in a warm-up test match.

Welsh Varsity rugby matches

On 30 March 2011, the stadium hosted the Welsh Varsity rugby match for the first time in the history of the match between the senior teams of Cardiff University and Swansea University. The stadium is used alternating years with Liberty Stadium in Swansea. The Welsh Varsity event celebrated its 20th anniversary in 2016.

Rugby World Cup

The Welsh Rugby Union hosted the 1999 Rugby World Cup with the Final being played at the stadium. The stadium also hosted 3 pool matches and 1 quarter-final match (New Zealand 18–20 France) of the 2007 Rugby World Cup.

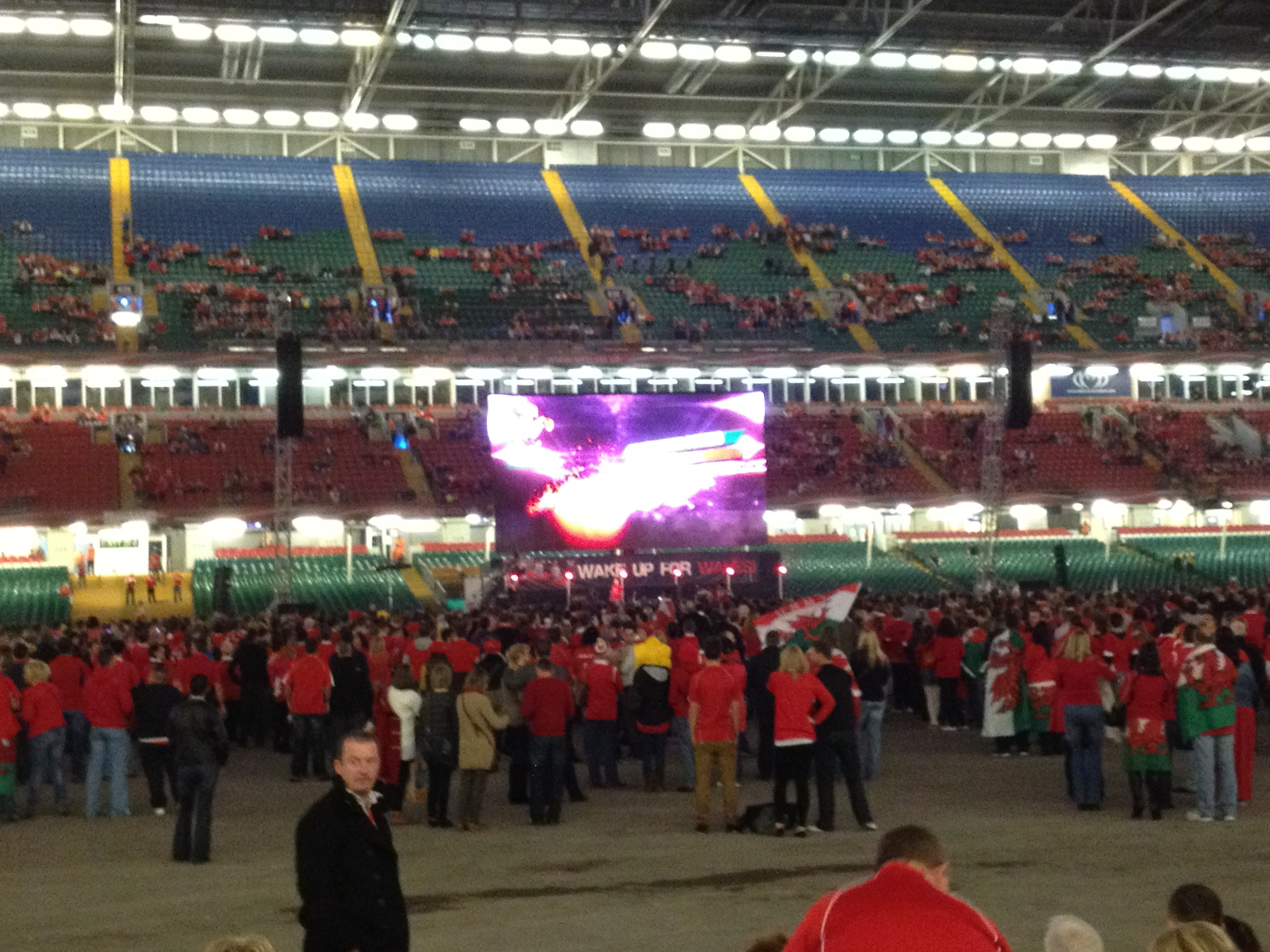
The big screen and some of the fans just after the doors opened for the semi-final between Wales and France

On 15 October 2011, the stadium was open to Welsh Rugby Union fans free of charge, providing that they wear red so that they could watch a live screening of the 2011 Rugby World Cup semi-final between Wales and France that was played at Eden Park, Auckland, New Zealand. The match was screened on the stadium's existing large screens, on all of their television screens and on a screen that was brought in for the occasion. The same was done for the Bronze Final between Wales and Australia which saw Wales defeated and take fourth place.

The stadium hosted six pool matches, including two featuring Wales, and two quarter-final matches during the 2015 Rugby World Cup.

| Year | Match | Country | Score | Country | Attendance |
|---|---|---|---|---|---|
| 1999 | Pool D match | Wales | 23–18 | Argentina | 72,500 |
| 1999 | Pool D match | Wales | 64–15 | Japan | 72,500 |
| 1999 | Pool D match | Wales | 31–38 | Samoa | 70,849 |
| 1999 | Pool D match | Argentina | 33–12 | Japan | 36,000 |
| 1999 | QF 2 | Wales | 9–24 | Australia | 74,499 |
| 1999 | Third place | South Africa | 22–18 | New Zealand | 60,000 |
| 1999 | Final | Australia | 35–12 | France | 72,500 |
| 2007 | Pool B match | Wales | 20–32 | Australia | 71,022 |
| 2007 | Pool B match | Fiji | 29–16 | Canada | 45,000 |
| 2007 | Pool B match | Wales | 72–18 | Japan | 35,245 |
| 2007 | QF 2 | New Zealand | 18–20 | France | 71,669 |
| 2015 | Pool A match | Wales | 54–9 | Uruguay | 71,887 |
| 2015 | Pool A match | Australia | 28–13 | Fiji | 67,253 |
| 2015 | Pool A match | Wales | 23–13 | Fiji | 71,576 |
| 2015 | Pool C match | New Zealand | 43–10 | Georgia | 69,167 |
| 2015 | Pool D match | Ireland | 50–7 | Canada | 68,523 |
| 2015 | Pool D match | France | 9–24 | Ireland | 72,163 |
| 2015 | QF 2 | New Zealand | 62–13 | France | 71,619 |
| 2015 | QF 3 | Ireland | 20–43 | Argentina | 72,316 |

=== Rugby league ===
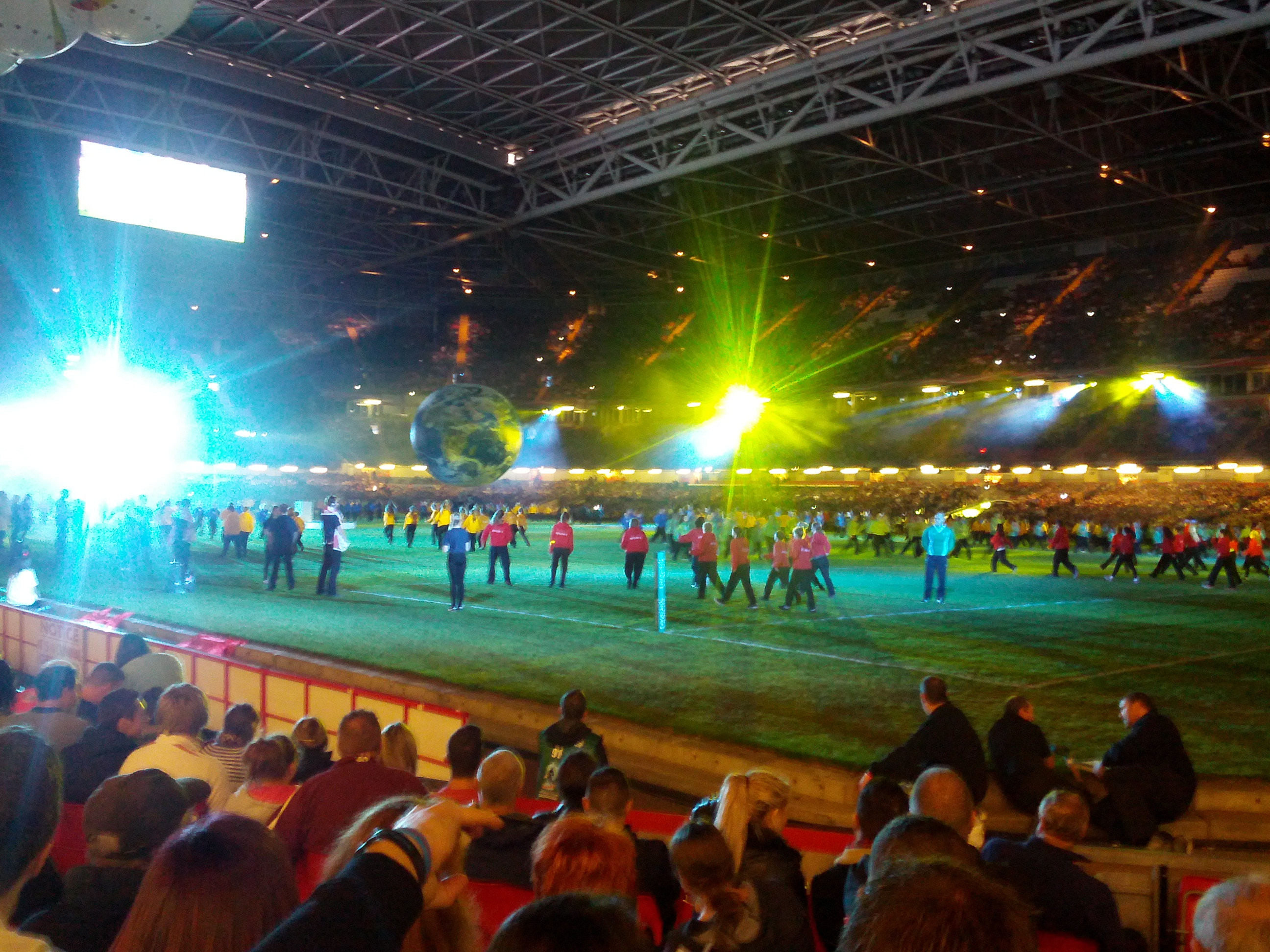
The opening ceremony of the 2013 Rugby League World Cup

The stadium first hosted rugby league football during the 2000 World Cup: a double header featuring Cook Islands versus Lebanon and Wales versus New Zealand that attracted a crowd of 17,612. It was again used as Wales' home ground during the 2002 New Zealand rugby league tour of Great Britain and France when they again hosted the Kiwis this time attracting 8,746 spectators.

The Stadium has hosted three Challenge Cup Finals, which are usually played at Wembley, from 2003 to 2005. In 2003 the Bradford Bulls defeated the Leeds Rhinos 22–20 in front of 71,212 fans. St. Helens defeated Wigan 36–16 in 2004 in front of 73,734 fans, while Hull F.C. defeated Leeds 25–24 in 2005 in front of 74,213 fans, the largest rugby league crowd at the stadium.

Also, in 2007 the stadium hosted the inaugural Millennium Magic weekend. This was a two-day event in May when an entire round of Super League matches were played, three games on the Saturday and three games on the Sunday. The event was deemed a success by the sport's governing body, the RFL, and second Millennium Magic event took place in May 2008, although the 2009 and 2010 events were held at Murrayfield Stadium and were renamed Magic Weekend. In 2011, Magic Weekend moved back to Cardiff with the opening round of Super League being played.

On 26 October 2013, the Millennium Stadium hosted the opening ceremony and the first two fixtures of the 2013 Rugby League World Cup: a double-header featuring Wales against Italy and England against title favourites and eventual tournament champions Australia. This double header produced an overall attendance of 45,052, which is an international rugby league record at the stadium.

| Date | Match | Country | Score | Country | Attendance |
|---|---|---|---|---|---|
| 5 November 2000 | 2000 World Cup Group 2 | Cook Islands | 22–22 | Lebanon | 17,612 |
| 5 November 2000 | 2000 World Cup Group 2 | Wales | 18–58 | New Zealand | 17,612 |
| 3 November 2002 | 2002 Kiwi tour | Wales | 22–50 | New Zealand | 8,746 |
| 26 November 2013 | 2013 World Cup Group A | Australia | 28–20 | England | 45,052 |
| 26 November 2013 | 2013 World Cup inter-group match | Wales | 16–32 | Italy | 45,052 |

=== Association football ===
From 2000 to 2009, the stadium was the almost-permanent home of Welsh football. The national team played the vast majority of home matches at the Millennium Stadium, with a handful of friendly matches once or twice a year at the Racecourse Ground, Wrexham or Liberty Stadium, Swansea. The first Welsh football game at the stadium was played against Finland in 2000, and drew a then-record home crowd for Welsh football of over 66,000. This has since been beaten on several occasions. However, since 2010, the majority of home games have been played at the smaller Cardiff City Stadium, the home of Cardiff City. Wales have only played at the stadium twice since 2009; in 2011 against England and in 2018 against Spain.

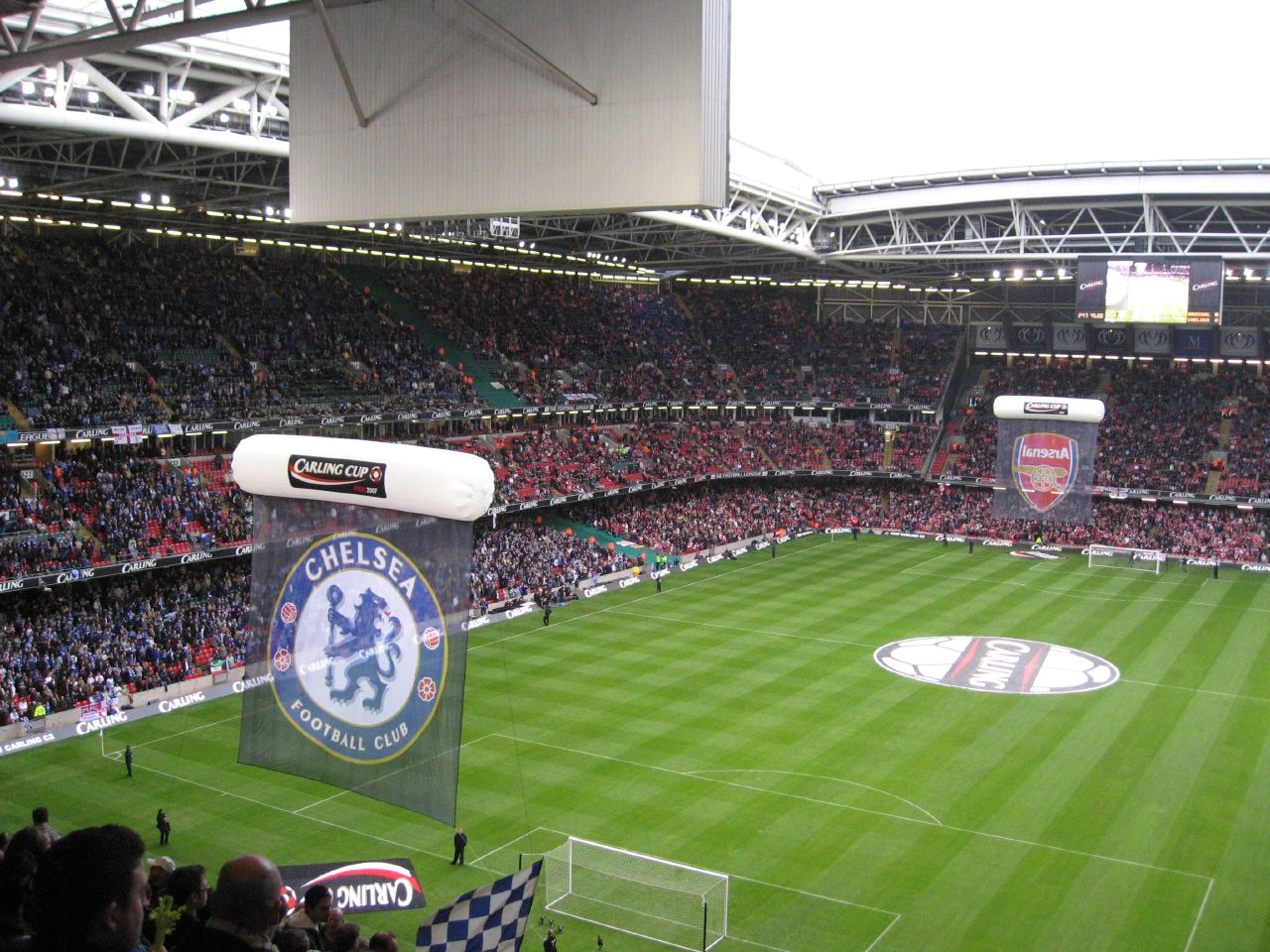
The 2007 Football League Cup Final between Chelsea and Arsenal

While the Millennium Stadium was under construction, the original Wembley Stadium had hosted the Welsh rugby team during the building of the new ground. The favour was returned from 2001 while the new Wembley Stadium was being built, with the Millennium hosting:

- FA Cup Final
- League Cup Final
- Football League Trophy Final
- Football League play-off Finals
- FA Community Shield

The stadium became notorious for an apparent "away team hoodoo"; the first 11 major cup finals were all won by the teams occupying the home dressing room. Stoke City beat Brentford 2–0 in 2002 to end the "hoodoo", after Paul Darby carried out a feng shui blessing.

Liverpool were the first team to win the FA Cup at the Millennium Stadium in 2001 after beating Arsenal 2–1. They were also the first team to win the League Cup at the Stadium, defeating Birmingham City in a penalty shoot-out earlier that year. In 2003, Liverpool won the League Cup for the seventh time in their history thanks to a 2–0 win over Manchester United in the final at the stadium. Liverpool also won the last FA Cup Final at the Millennium Stadium in 2006, beating West Ham United 3–1 in a penalty shoot-out that followed a 3–3 draw after extra time in what was billed as 'the best cup final of the modern era'.

The Football League Third Division play-offs in 2003 saw AFC Bournemouth beat Lincoln City 5–2. In this game, Bournemouth set a new record for the most goals scored by one team in a single match at the stadium. This record has since been matched but not beaten. The last domestic cup match played was when Doncaster Rovers beat Bristol Rovers 3–2 after extra time in the Football League Trophy Final on 1 April 2007.

When London was selected as the host city for the 2012 Summer Olympics, the Millennium Stadium was named as one of the six venues for the football competition. It had the distinction of hosting the opening event of the Games – a 1–0 win for the Great Britain women's team against New Zealand – as well as four other group games and a quarter-final in the women's tournament, and three group games, a quarter-final and the bronze medal match in the men's.

The stadium hosted the FA Community Shield Match between 2025-26 Premier League winners Arsenal and 2025-26 FA Cup Winners Manchester City on Sunday 16 August, as Wembley Stadium was in use for a concert by Canadian artist The Weeknd. This marked the first association football match to be played at the stadium since the 2017 UEFA Champions League Final. Arsenal won the match by a scoreline of 3-0.

==== UEFA Champions League ====
In 2001, the Football Association of Wales (FAW) confirmed that they had bid to host the 2003 UEFA Champions League Final. The stadium had recently been rated as a five-star stadium by UEFA, making it one of the favourites to host the match, but the final was eventually awarded to Old Trafford, the home of Manchester United.

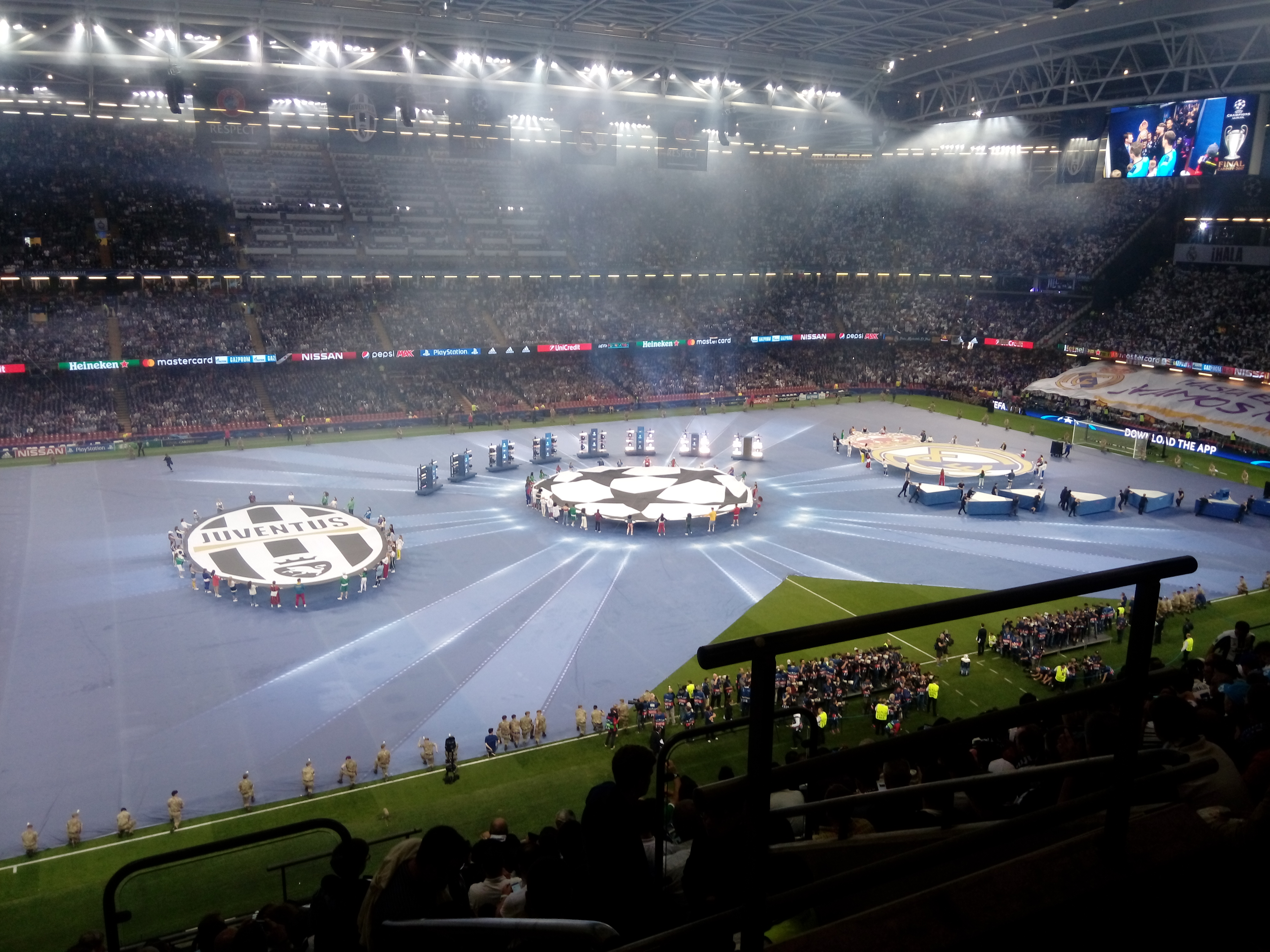
The opening ceremony of the 2017 UEFA Champions League Final

On 30 June 2015, the Millennium Stadium was chosen as the venue for the 2017 UEFA Champions League Final. Due to UEFA regulations regarding the use of names of non-tournament sponsors, the stadium continued to use the name "Millennium Stadium" in official literature, while the name "National Stadium of Wales" was used for the final itself. UEFA rules also resulted in all titles and logos – as well as those of other non-UEFA sponsors – being covered or removed for the duration. The game was played on 3 June 2017 between Italian club Juventus and Spanish club Real Madrid, in a repeat of the 1998 final; Real Madrid won the match 4–1.

UEFA Champions League finals
| Season | Winners | Score | Runners-up | Attendance |
|---|---|---|---|---|
| 2016–17 | Real Madrid (Spain) | 4–1 | (Italy) Juventus | 65,842 |

==== UEFA Euros ====
It was suggested that the stadium would have been one of the venues of a proposed UEFA Euro 2016 championship hosted jointly by Wales and Scotland. However, the bid did not reach the formal UEFA selection stage, having been abandoned by the Welsh and Scottish Football Associations for financial reasons.

In April 2014, the FAW did submit a formal bid to host three group matches and either a round of 16 match or a quarter-final at Euro 2020, which UEFA planned to host at 13 venues across Europe. When the host venues were voted on in September 2014, the Millennium Stadium lost out by a single vote behind Glasgow's Hampden Park, a decision that FAW chief executive Jonathan Ford put down to UEFA politics.

In November 2025 it was announced that the stadium would host 6 rounds of UEFA Euro 2028, Including the opening fixture, a Round of 16 match & a quarter final fixture. As with the 2017 Champions League Final, due to UEFA Rules the stadium will be referred to as the "National Stadium of Wales".

=== Boxing ===
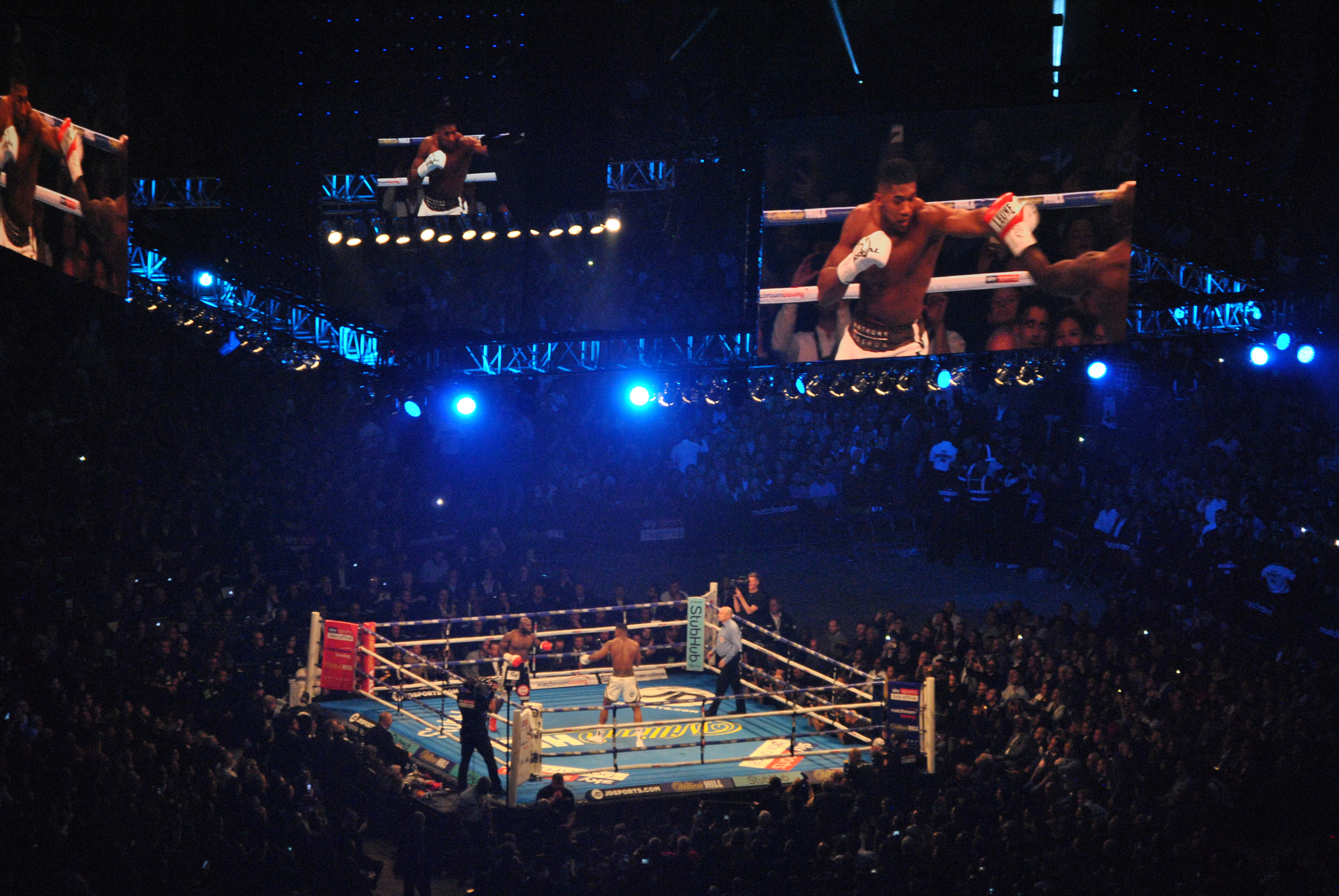
Anthony Joshua v Carlos Takam

There have been five nights of boxing at the stadium. On 8 July 2006 when Matt Skelton beat Danny Williams for the Commonwealth heavyweight title.

On 7 April 2007, Joe Calzaghe beat Peter Manfredo to retain his WBO super middleweight belt in front of 35,018 spectators.

On 3 November 2007, Calzaghe beat Mikkel Kessler to retain his WBO super middleweight belt and win the WBA and WBC super middleweight titles in front of 50,150 spectators.

On 28 October 2017 Anthony Joshua successfully retained his WBA (Super), IBF and IBO heavyweight titles against mandatory challenger Carlos Takam with a 10th round stoppage in front of 78,000 spectators.

On 31 March 2018, it hosted the World heavyweight unification fight between Anthony Joshua, holder of the WBA and IBF belts, and Joseph Parker, holder of the WBO belt. Joshua beat Parker on points in front of 78,000 spectators.

Anthony Joshua and Tyson Fury are due to fight at the stadium on 11 December 2026 , an event that will be live streamed globally on Netflix.

=== Motorsports ===
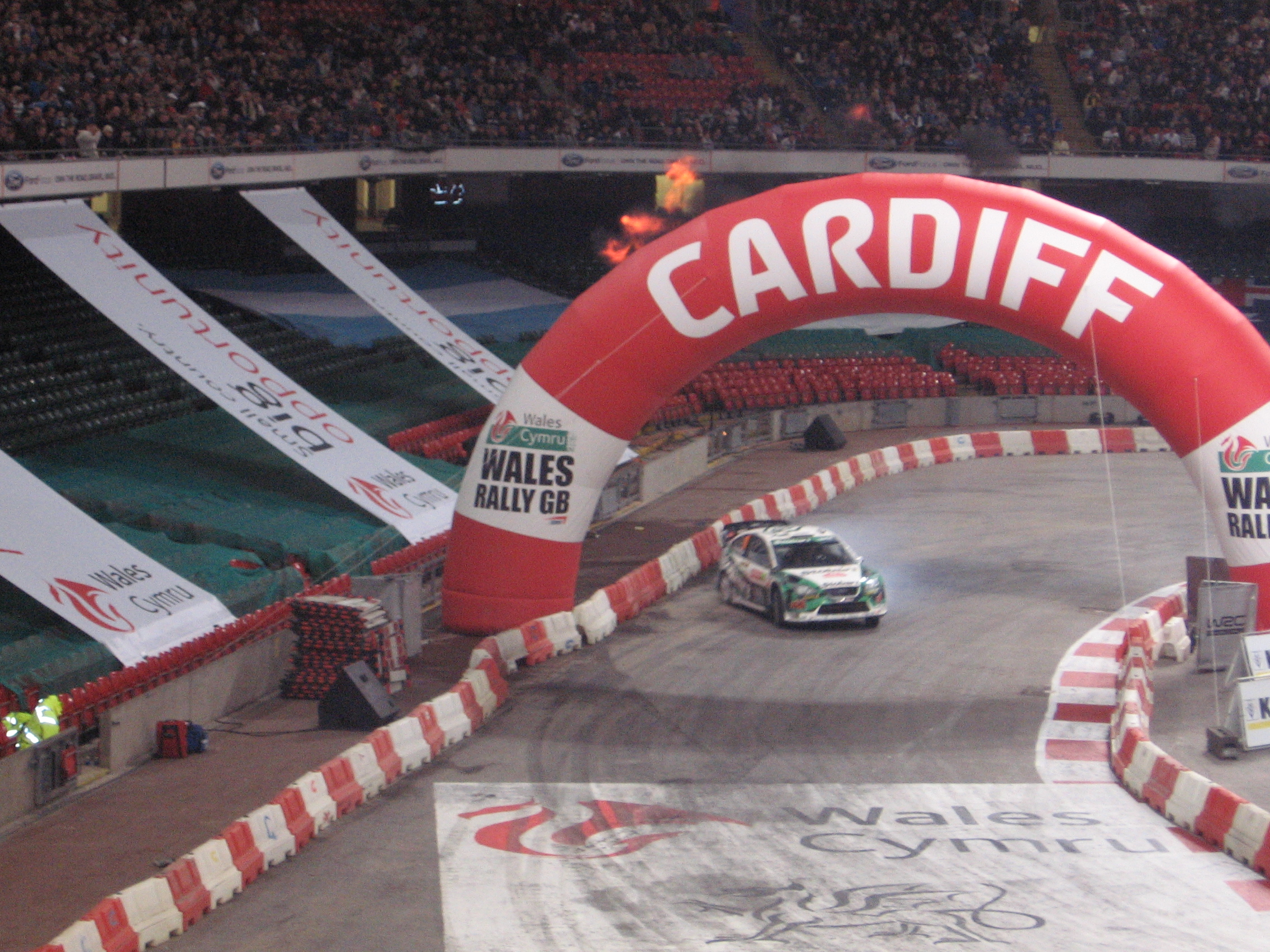
The 2006 Wales Rally Great Britain

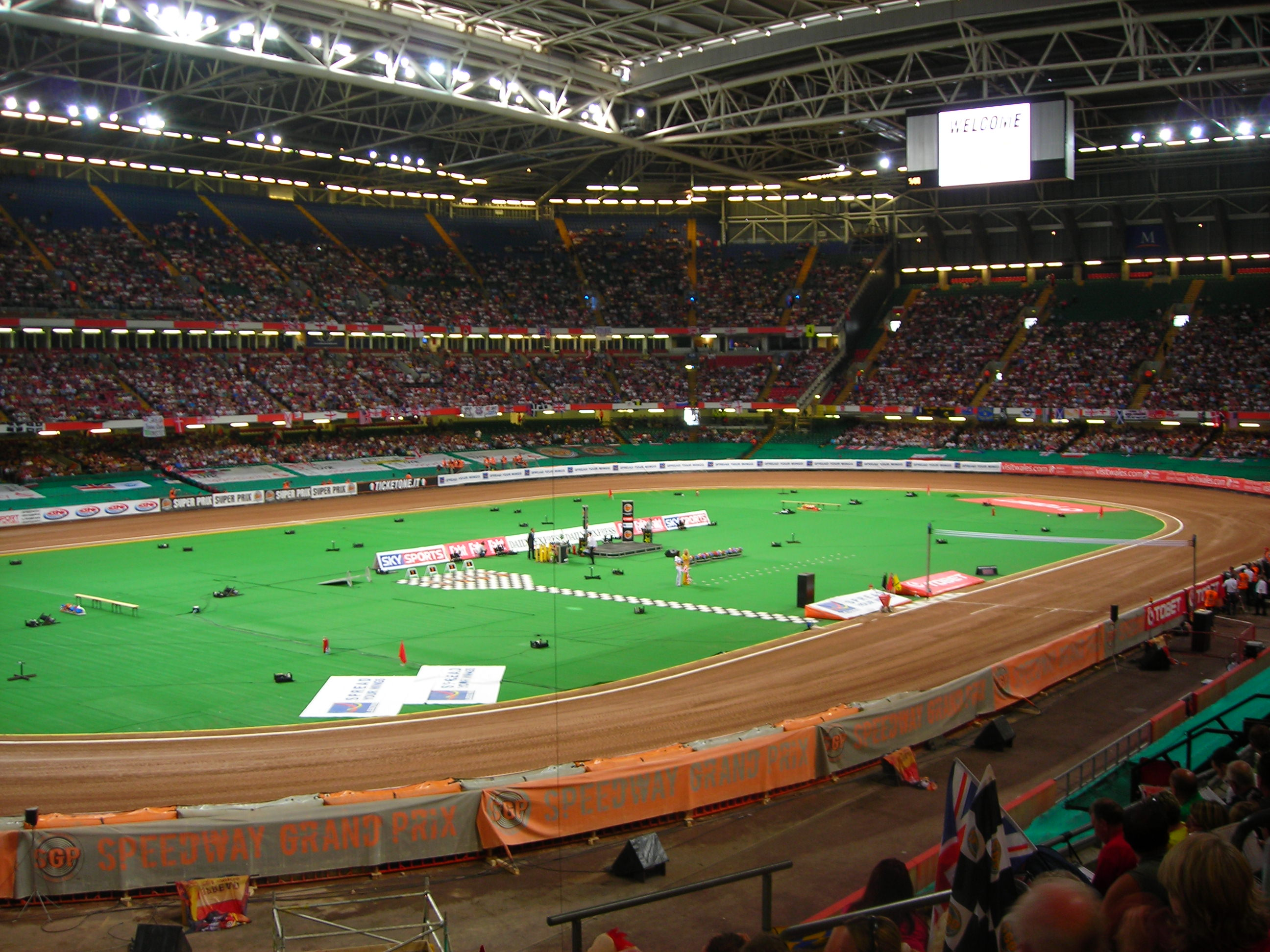
The 2009 Speedway Grand Prix of Great Britain

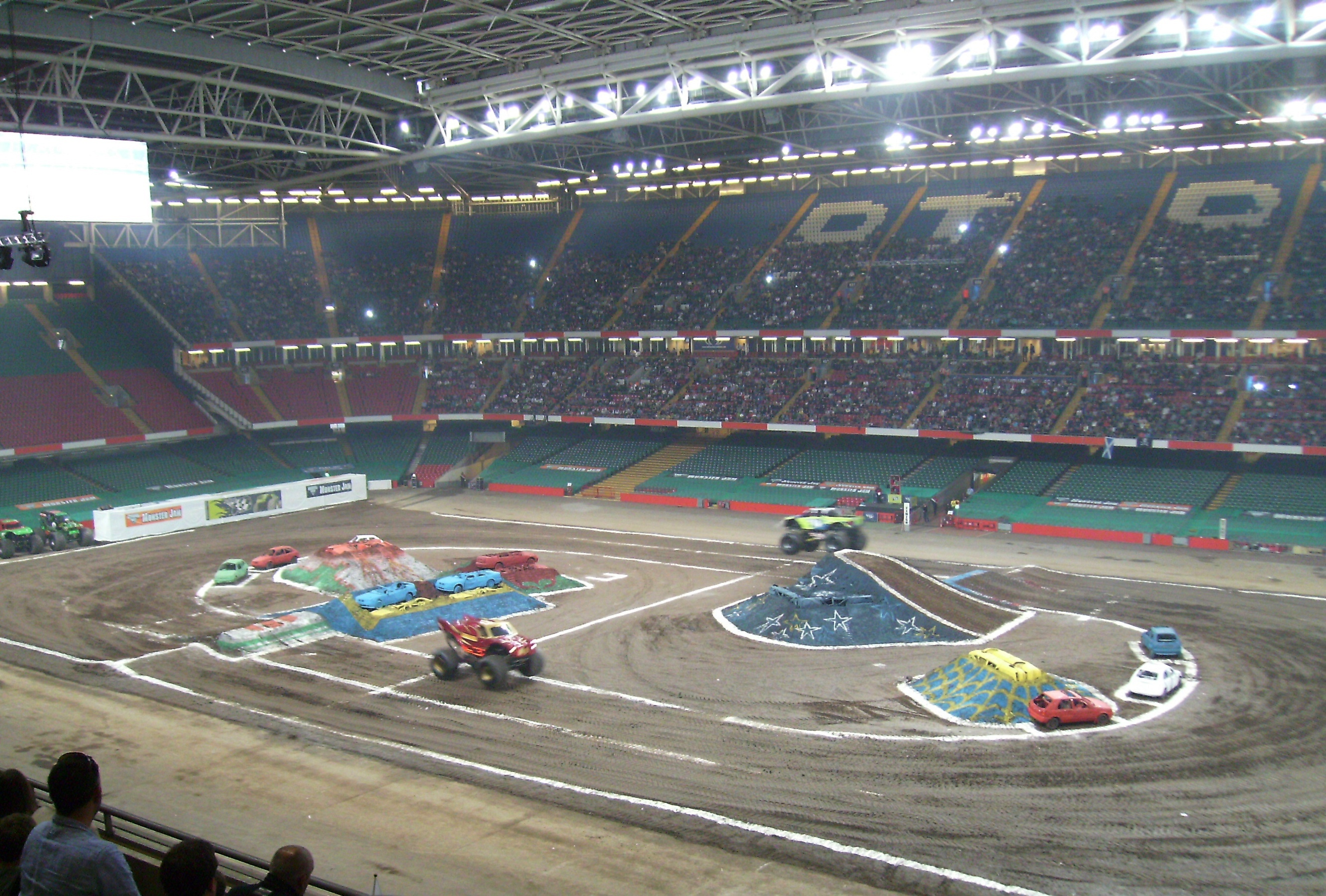
The 2010 Monster Jam

In 2001, the stadium staged its first ever motorsport event, hosting the Speedway Grand Prix of Great Britain, which continued annually, attracting a record crowd of 44,150 in 2010. The temporary motorcycle speedway track was 278 metres (304 yards) in length and with sections of the stadiums lower seating bowl covered, the capacity of the stadium for the Grand Prix was set at 62,500. The 2025 event was cancelled for commercial reasons.

In September 2005, the stadium was host to the first ever indoor stage of the World Rally Championship during the Wales Rally Great Britain. The lower tier of the stadium was removed to create a figure-of-eight course. In addition to this, the stadium has also hosted Supercross events. In October 2007, the stadium first hosted the UK leg of the Monster Jam trucks Europe tour, and returned in June 2008, again in 2009, 2010, 2016, 2018 and 2019.

=== Film ===
The stadium has been used on numerous occasions as a venue for shooting film and television productions. Scenes from the 2001 Hindi film Kabhi Khushi Kabhie Gham were filmed there.

Between 2004 and 2011, the stadium was used several times as a filming location for episodes of the BBC science fiction television series Doctor Who. The 2005 episode "Dalek" was shot primarily on location at the stadium, using its underground areas to represent a bunker in Utah, US, in the year 2012. The location shooting for the episode took place during October and November 2004. The underground areas of the stadium were used again in August 2005 to film Mission Control scenes for the Doctor Who Christmas special, "The Christmas Invasion", and again the following year to film scenes in the underground corridors of Torchwood in "The Runaway Bride" episode, broadcast on Christmas Day 2006. Shots of the Stormcage Facility in which River Song is incarcerated in series 5 and 6 of Doctor Who are also in the stadium, filmed between October 2010 and January 2011.

The stadium has also been used as a location for the filming of Doctor Who spin-off The Sarah Jane Adventures. The 2010 story, "Death of the Doctor", included corridor scenes for the UNIT headquarters that were filmed underground at the Millennium Stadium.

The Wembley Stadium scene in the film 28 Weeks Later was actually filmed at the Millennium Stadium. Although the outside is footage of Wembley, the inside is all filmed in Cardiff. The visual effects team on the film edited the footage to make it look more like Wembley.

Sébastien Foucan jumped over the gap of the opening of the stadium roof in the parkour documentary "Jump Britain".

=== Eventing ===
The inaugural Express Eventing International Cup took place at the stadium on 30 November 2008. The three-event competition made up of dressage, cross-country and show jumping all took place over the one day. The event was won by Oliver Townend.

=== Concerts ===
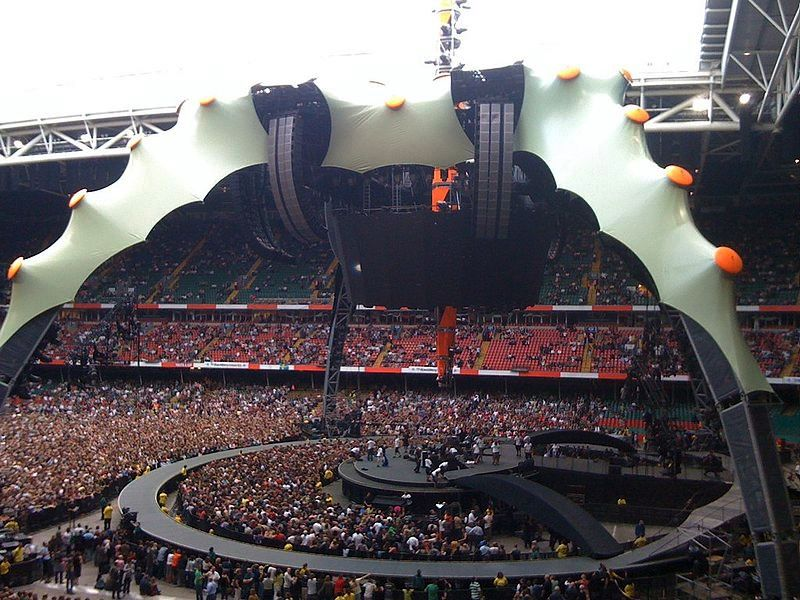
The set for the U2 360° Tour

The stadium has also been used for a variety of musical events, including the Manic Street Preachers concert held on Millennium Eve, and, on the following day, a recording of the BBC's Songs of Praise, which attracted an attendance of 60,000. Tina Turner performed a sold-out concert at the stadium during her highly successful Twenty Four Seven Tour in 2000. Welsh rockers Stereophonics have played two sold-out shows at the stadium: In July 2001 as part of their two-day "A Day at the Races" festival which would later be released to DVD and in 2003, shortly after the departure of the late Stuart Cable.

American rock band Bon Jovi played the venue during the One Wild Night Tour in 2001. At the end of January 2005, the stadium hosted a tsunami relief concert in aid of the victims of the 2004 Indian Ocean earthquake and tsunami, with Eric Clapton headlining the event. The stadium has also been host to Madonna on two occasions, the first in July 2006 when she opened the UK leg of her Confessions Tour, and most recently in August 2008 when she kicked off her Sticky & Sweet Tour at the stadium. Other performers who have played at the stadium include Robbie Williams as part of his Weddings, Barmitzvahs & Stadiums Tour, U2 as part of their Vertigo Tour, Red Hot Chili Peppers as part of their By the Way tour, The Rolling Stones as part of their A Bigger Bang Tour, R.E.M. as part of their Monster tour and again for their Around the Sun tour.

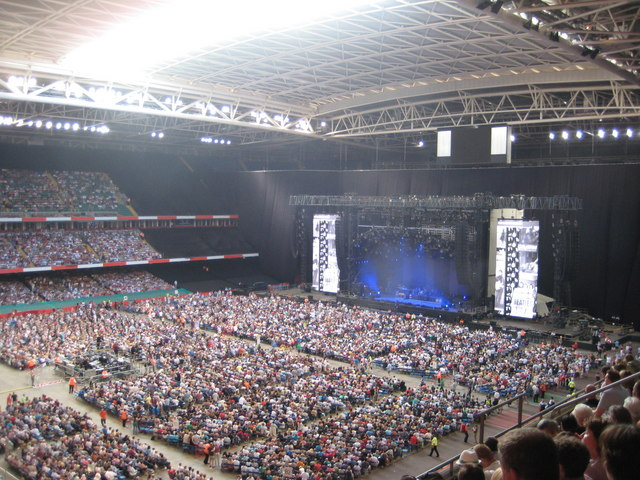
The set for Paul McCartney's Up and Coming Tour

Paul McCartney also played at the stadium as part of his Up and Coming Tour, and The Police performed there as part of their Reunion Tour. In late 2005, Oasis played at the stadium during their Don't Believe the Truth Tour and again on their Dig Out Your Soul Tour in 2009. In 2008, the stadium hosted Neil Diamond and Bruce Springsteen with the E Street Band as part of their Magic Tour. On 22 August 2009, U2 again played at the stadium, as part of their European leg of their U2 360° Tour, playing to a record-breaking concert attendance of 73,354. On May 17, 2023, Beyoncé performed at the stadium as part of her Renaissance World Tour. Taylor Swift played at the stadium on June 18, 2024 as part of The Eras Tour. In 2024, it was announced Oasis would play at the stadium in July 2025 for the opening two nights of their Live '25 Tour. Lana Del Rey took the stage on June 23, 2025 as part of her UK and Ireland stadium tour.

=== Conferences ===
The stadium offers conferencing facilities via the foodservice organisation Compass Group. The facilities consist of six individually designed lounges and 124 pitch-facing executive box suites.

In addition to business events, the facilities are also available for dinners, banquets, balls, parties and weddings receptions.

=== Temporary hospital ===
On 28 March 2020, it was announced that the stadium was to be converted at a cost of £8 million into a temporary field hospital to accommodate up to 2000 patients of the COVID-19 pandemic, at the same time as the Excel Centre, London, NEC, Birmingham, and the Manchester Central Convention Complex. By the weekend of 11–12 April 2020, it had a capacity of 330 beds.

=== Professional wrestling ===
On 12 April 2022, American professional wrestling company WWE announced that it would hold a major event at Millennium Stadium on 3 September, and opened pre-registration for tickets. The event was announced as being WWE's largest show in the UK since SummerSlam at the original Wembley Stadium in 1992. On 29 April 2022, it was announced that the event would be titled Clash at the Castle, in reference to nearby Cardiff Castle. The event attracted over 59,000 ticket pre-sale registrations, a company record.

== See also ==
- Sport in Cardiff
- Millennium Stadium Charitable Trust
- List of stadiums by capacity
- List of covered stadiums by capacity
- List of stadiums in Wales by capacity
- List of European stadiums by capacity
- List of association football stadiums by capacity
- List of tallest buildings in Cardiff
- Lists of stadiums

== Notes ==
Events and tenants
| Preceded by Ellis Park Stadium; Johannesburg | Rugby World Cup; Final venue 1999 | Succeeded by Stadium Australia; Sydney |
| Preceded by Wembley Stadium; London | FA Cup; Final venue 2001–2006 | Succeeded by Wembley Stadium; London |
| Preceded by Wembley Stadium; London | League Cup; Final venue 2001–2007 | Succeeded by Wembley Stadium; London |
| Preceded by Brandon Stadium; Coventry | Speedway Grand Prix; Speedway Grand Prix of Great Britain; 2001–2024 | Succeeded by National Speedway Stadium; Manchester |
| Preceded by Parc des Princes; Paris | Heineken Cup; Final venue 2002 | Succeeded by Lansdowne Road; Dublin |
| Preceded by Murrayfield Stadium; Edinburgh | Heineken Cup; Final venue 2006 | Succeeded by Twickenham Stadium; London |
| Preceded by Twickenham Stadium; London | Heineken Cup; Final venue 2008 | Succeeded by Murrayfield Stadium; Edinburgh |
| Preceded by Stade de France; Saint-Denis | Heineken Cup; Final venue 2011 | Succeeded by Twickenham Stadium; London |
| Preceded by Aviva Stadium; Dublin | Heineken Cup; Final venue 2014 | Succeeded by Twickenham Stadium; London |
| Preceded by San Siro; Milan | UEFA Champions League; Final venue 2017 | Succeeded by NSC Olimpiyskiy Stadium; Kyiv |
