= 2001 Speedway Grand Prix of Great Britain =

Speedway race in Cardiff, Wales

(United Kingdom) 2001 Speedway Grand Prix of Great Britain

Information
- Date: 9 June 2001
- City: (United Kingdom) Cardiff
- Event: 2 of 6 (38)
- Referee: Anthony Steele

Stadium details
- Stadium: Millennium Stadium
- Length: 3,877 m (4,240 yd)

SGP Results
- Best Time: (Sweden) Jimmy Nilsen; 58,33 secs
- (gold) Winner: (Sweden) Tony Rickardsson
- (silver) Runner-up: (Australia) Jason Crump
- (bronze) 3rd place: (Poland) Tomasz Gollob

The 2001 Speedway Grand Prix of Great Britain was the second race of the 2001 Speedway Grand Prix season. It took place on 9 June in the Millennium Stadium in Cardiff, Wales

The Grand Prix was won by the Swedish rider Tony Rickardsson (his 7th career Grand Prix win).

== Starting positions draw ==
The Speedway Grand Prix Commission nominated Martin Dugard and Scott Nicholls as Wild Card. Injured Joe Screen and Peter Karlsson were replaced by Henrik Gustafsson and Grzegorz Walasek.

1.	POL (7) Tomasz Gollob
2.	DEN (13) Nicki Pedersen
3.	SWE (3) Tony Rickardsson
4.	SWE (11) Peter Karlsson → POL (26) Grzegorz Walasek
5.	AUS (8) Todd Wiltshire
6.	AUS (6) Leigh Adams
7.	AUS (9) Ryan Sullivan
8.	USA (5) Greg Hancock
9.	DEN (19) Brian Andersen
10.	GBR (12) Carl Stonehewer
11.	SVN (22) Matej Ferjan
12.	GBR (1) Mark Loram
13.	USA (2) Billy Hamill
14.	AUS (4) Jason Crump
15.	POL (16) Piotr Protasiewicz
16.	SWE (21) Niklas Klingberg
17.	GBR (10) Chris Louis
18.	GBR (20) Andy Smith
19.	SWE (15) Mikael Karlsson
20.	NOR (14) Rune Holta
21.	SWE (17) Jimmy Nilsen
22.	GBR (18) Joe Screen → SWE (25) Henrik Gustafsson
23.	GBR (23) Martin Dugard
24.	GBR (24) Scott Nicholls

== Heat details ==
Placing	Draw	Rider	Total	Pre-Main Event										Main Event										Final Event
Placing	Draw	Rider	Total	Round 1						Round 2				Round 1						Round 2				1/2		CF	F
Placing	Draw	Rider	Total	1	2	3	4	5	6	7	8	9	10	11	12	13	14	15	16	17	18	19	20	21	22	23	24
1	3	(Sweden) (3) Tony Rickardsson	25													1				2					2		1
2	14	(Australia) (4) Jason Crump	20			1				1				2							4R	2			1		2
3	1	(Poland) (7) Tomasz Gollob	18											1						1				1			3
4	16	(Sweden) (21) Niklas Klingberg	16	3				2					2	4					2			1		2			4
5	7	(Australia) (9) Ryan Sullivan	15												4			2					1		3	1
6	5	(Australia) (8) Todd Wiltshire	14														1				2			4X		2
7	21	(Sweden) (17) Jimmy Nilsen	12				1				1				1						1				4	3
8	4	(Poland) (26) Grzegorz Walasek	10														2			4F			2	3		4
9	12	(United Kingdom) (1) Mark Loram	8				2			2						2					3Fx		3
10	6	(Australia) (6) Leigh Adams	8													3		1				3
11	2	(Denmark) (13) Nicki Pedersen	7												2					3		4
12	11	(Slovenia) (22) Matej Ferjan	7			4			1				1			4			1				4
13	8	(United States) (5) Greg Hancock	6											3				3
14	15	(Poland) (16) Piotr Protasiewicz	6		3				2			2			3				3
15	10	(United Kingdom) (12) Carl Stonehewer	5		1						4X	1					3		4
16	9	(Denmark) (19) Brian Andersen	5	2							2						4	4
Placing	Draw	Rider	Total	1	2	3	4	5	6	7	8	9	10	11	12	13	14	15	16	17	18	19	20	21	22	23	24
17	23	(United Kingdom) (23) Martin Dugard	4		2					4R			3
18	24	(United Kingdom) (24) Scott Nicholls	4	1						3		3R
19	13	(United States) (2) Billy Hamill	3				4X	1				4X
20	22	(Sweden) (25) Henrik Gustafsson	3			2					3		4
21	20	(Norway) (14) Rune Holta	2				3		3
22	19	(Sweden) (15) Mikael Karlsson	2			3		3
23	17	(United Kingdom) (10) Chris Louis	1	4					4
24	18	(United Kingdom) (20) Andy Smith	1		4			4

Heats 1-10: Pre-Main Event 1-4: First round 5-6: Last chance for second round 7-8: Second round 9-10: Last chance Main Event	Heats 11-20: Main Event 11-14: First round 15-16: Last chance for second round 17-18: Second round 19-20: Last chance for Semi-Finals	Heats 21-24: Final Event 21-22: Semi-Finals 23: Consolation Final 24: The Big Final

gate A – inside	gate B	gate C	gate D – outside

== Standings ==
Qualifies for next season's Grand Prix series
Full-time Grand Prix rider
Wild card, track reserve or qualified reserve

Pos.	Rider	Points	GER (Germany)	GBR (United Kingdom)	DEN (Denmark)	CZE (Czech Republic)	POL (Poland)	SWE (Sweden)
1	(Poland) (7) Tomasz Gollob	43	25	18				
2	(Sweden) (3) Tony Rickardsson	41	16	25				
3	(Australia) (8) Todd Wiltshire	28	14	14				
4	(Australia) (4) Jason Crump	25	5	20				
5	(Australia) (9) Ryan Sullivan	25	10	15				
6	(Denmark) (13) Nicki Pedersen	25	18	7				
7	(Sweden) (25) Henrik Gustafsson	23	20	3				
8	(Australia) (6) Leigh Adams	20	12	8				
9	(Sweden) (21) Niklas Klingberg	20	4	16				
10	(Sweden) (11) Peter Karlsson	15	15	–				
11	(United Kingdom) (1) Mark Loram	14	6	8				
12	(United States) (5) Greg Hancock	14	8	6				
13	(Slovenia) (22) Matej Ferjan	14	7	7				
14	(Sweden) (17) Jimmy Nilsen	13	1	12				
15	(Denmark) (19) Brian Andersen	13	8	5				
16	(United Kingdom) (12) Carl Stonehewer	12	7	5				
17	(Poland) (16) Piotr Protasiewicz	10	4	6				
18	(Poland) (26) Grzegorz Walasek	10	–	10				
19	(United States) (2) Billy Hamill	8	5	3				
20	(Germany) (23) Robert Barth	6	6					
21	(United Kingdom) (10) Chris Louis	4	3	1				
22	(Sweden) (15) Mikael Karlsson	4	2	2				
23	(United Kingdom) (20) Andy Smith	4	3	1				
24	(United Kingdom) (23) Martin Dugard	4	–	4				
25	(United Kingdom) (24) Scott Nicholls	4	–	4				
27	(Norway) (14) Rune Holta	3	1	2				
26	(Germany) (24) Mirko Wolter	2	2					
Rider(s) not classified
	(United Kingdom) (18) Joe Screen	—	–	–				
Pos.	Rider	Points	GER (Germany)	GBR (United Kingdom)	DEN (Denmark)	CZE (Czech Republic)	POL (Poland)	SWE (Sweden)

== See also ==
- Speedway Grand Prix
- List of Speedway Grand Prix riders
