= 2001 Speedway Grand Prix of Germany =

World championship speedway event

Information
- Date: 5 May 2001
- City: (Germany) Berlin
- Event: 1 of 6 (37)
- Referee: Anthony Steele

Stadium details
- Stadium: Friedrich-Ludwig-Jahn-Sportpark

SGP Results
- Best Time
- (gold) Winner: (Poland) Tomasz Gollob
- (silver) Runner-up: (Sweden) Henrik Gustafsson
- (bronze) 3rd place: (Denmark) Nicki Pedersen

The 2001 Speedway Grand Prix of Germany was the first race of the 2001 Speedway Grand Prix season. It took place on 5 May 2001 in the Friedrich-Ludwig-Jahn-Sportpark in Berlin, Germany.

== Starting positions draw ==
The Speedway Grand Prix Commission nominated Robert Barth and Mirko Wolter as Wild Card. Injured Joe Screen was replaced by Henrik Gustafsson.

1.	GBR (1) Mark Loram
2.	USA (2) Billy Hamill
3.	SWE (3) Tony Rickardsson
4.	AUS (4) Jason Crump
5.	USA (5) Greg Hancock
6.	AUS (6) Leigh Adams
7.	POL (7) Tomasz Gollob
8.	AUS (8) Todd Wiltshire
9.	AUS (9) Ryan Sullivan
10.	GBR (10) Chris Louis
11.	SWE (11) Peter Karlsson
12.	GBR (12) Carl Stonehewer
13.	DEN (13) Nicki Pedersen
14.	NOR (14) Rune Holta
15.	SWE (15) Mikael Karlsson
16.	POL (16) Piotr Protasiewicz
17.	SWE (17) Jimmy Nilsen
18.	GBR (18) Joe Screen → SWE (25) Henrik Gustafsson
19.	DEN (19) Brian Andersen
20.	GBR (20) Andy Smith
21.	SWE (21) Niklas Klingberg
22.	SVN (22) Matej Ferjan
23.	GER (23) Robert Barth
24.	GER (24) Mirko Wolter

== Heat details ==
Placing	Draw	Rider	Total	Pre-Main Event										Main Event										Final Event
Placing	Draw	Rider	Total	Round 1						Round 2				Round 1						Round 2				1/2		CF	F
Placing	Draw	Rider	Total	1	2	3	4	5	6	7	8	9	10	11	12	13	14	15	16	17	18	19	20	21	22	23	24
1	7	(Poland) (7) Tomasz Gollob	25												4R			1				1		2			1
2	18	(Sweden) (25) Henrik Gustafsson	20		1						1				1						1				2		2
3	13	(Denmark) (13) Nicki Pedersen	18				2			1				1						2					1		3
4	3	(Sweden) (3) Tony Rickardsson	16													4X			1				2	1			4
5	11	(Sweden) (11) Peter Karlsson	15			2					2						2			1				3		1
6	8	(Australia) (8) Todd Wiltshire	14											2							2			4		2
7	6	(Australia) (6) Leigh Adams	12													1				3		2			3	3
8	9	(Australia) (9) Ryan Sullivan	10	1						2						3		2					1		4	4
9	5	(United States) (5) Greg Hancock	8														3		2			3
10	19	(Denmark) (19) Brian Andersen	8			1				3		1					1				3		3
11	12	(United Kingdom) (12) Carl Stonehewer	7				3		2			2			2					4			4F
12	22	(Slovenia) (22) Matej Ferjan	7			4			1				1			2					4	4
13	1	(United Kingdom) (1) Mark Loram	6											3				3
14	23	(Germany) (23) Robert Barth	6		4			2					2	4					3
15	2	(United States) (2) Billy Hamill	5												3				4F
16	4	(Australia) (4) Jason Crump	5														4	4
Placing	Draw	Rider	Total	1	2	3	4	5	6	7	8	9	10	11	12	13	14	15	16	17	18	19	20	21	22	23	24
17	16	(Poland) (16) Piotr Protasiewicz	4	2							4	3
18	21	(Sweden) (21) Niklas Klingberg	4				1				3		3
19	10	(United Kingdom) (10) Chris Louis	3		2					4			4
20	20	(United Kingdom) (20) Andy Smith	3				4	1				4
21	15	(Sweden) (15) Mikael Karlsson	2		3				3
22	24	(Germany) (24) Mirko Wolter	2	3				3
23	14	(Norway) (14) Rune Holta	1			3		4R
24	17	(Sweden) (17) Jimmy Nilsen	1	4					4

Heats 1-10: Pre-Main Event 1-4: First round 5-6: Last chance for second round 7-8: Second round 9-10: Last chance Main Event	Heats 11-20: Main Event 11-14: First round 15-16: Last chance for second round 17-18: Second round 19-20: Last chance for Semi-Finals	Heats 21-24: Final Event 21-22: Semi-Finals 23: Consolation Final 24: The Big Final

gate A – inside	gate B	gate C	gate D – outside

== Standings ==
Qualifies for next season's Grand Prix series
Full-time Grand Prix rider
Wild card, track reserve or qualified reserve

Pos.	Rider	Points	GER (Germany)	GBR (United Kingdom)	DEN (Denmark)	CZE (Czech Republic)	POL (Poland)	SWE (Sweden)
1	(Poland) (7) Tomasz Gollob	25	25					
2	(Sweden) (25) Henrik Gustafsson	20	20					
3	(Denmark) (13) Nicki Pedersen	18	18					
4	(Sweden) (3) Tony Rickardsson	16	16					
5	(Sweden) (11) Peter Karlsson	15	15					
6	(Australia) (8) Todd Wiltshire	14	14					
7	(Australia) (6) Leigh Adams	12	12					
8	(Australia) (9) Ryan Sullivan	10	10					
9	(United States) (5) Greg Hancock	8	8					
10	(Denmark) (19) Brian Andersen	8	8					
11	(United Kingdom) (12) Carl Stonehewer	7	7					
12	(Slovenia) (22) Matej Ferjan	7	7					
13	(United Kingdom) (1) Mark Loram	6	6					
14	(Germany) (23) Robert Barth	6	6					
15	(United States) (2) Billy Hamill	5	5					
16	(Australia) (4) Jason Crump	5	5					
17	(Poland) (16) Piotr Protasiewicz	4	4					
18	(Sweden) (21) Niklas Klingberg	4	4					
19	(United Kingdom) (10) Chris Louis	3	3					
20	(United Kingdom) (20) Andy Smith	3	3					
21	(Sweden) (15) Mikael Karlsson	2	2					
22	(Germany) (24) Mirko Wolter	2	2					
23	(Norway) (14) Rune Holta	1	1					
24	(Sweden) (17) Jimmy Nilsen	1	1					
Rider(s) not classified
	(United Kingdom) (18) Joe Screen	—	–					
Pos.	Rider	Points	GER (Germany)	GBR (United Kingdom)	DEN (Denmark)	CZE (Czech Republic)	POL (Poland)	SWE (Sweden)

== See also ==
- Speedway Grand Prix
- List of Speedway Grand Prix riders
