= 2005 Speedway Grand Prix of Denmark =

Speedway Grand Prix event

- Venue: Parken Stadium
- Location: Copenhagen, (Denmark)
- Start date: 25 June 2005
- Competitors: 16 (2 reserves)

The 2005 Speedway Grand Prix of Denmark was the fifth round of the 2005 Speedway Grand Prix season (the world championship). It took place on 25 June 2005 at the Parken Stadium in Copenhagen, Denmark.

It was the 11th time that the Speedway Grand Prix of Denmark had been held.

The Grand Prix was by the Swedish rider Tony Rickardsson (his 18th career Grand Prix win and fourth of the 2005 campaign).

== Grand Prix result ==
| Placing | Rider | 1 | 2 | 3 | 4 | 5 | 6 | 7 | 8 | 9 | 10 | 11 | 12 | 13 | 14 | 15 | 16 | 17 | 18 | 19 | 20 | Pts | SF1 | SF2 | Final | GP Pts |
|---|---|---|---|---|---|---|---|---|---|---|---|---|---|---|---|---|---|---|---|---|---|---|---|---|---|---|
| 1 | (Sweden) (6) Tony Rickardsson | | 3 | | | | 2 | | | 0 | | | | | | | 3 | | | 3 | | 11 | | 2 | 3 | 25 |
| 2 | (United States) (11) Greg Hancock | | | 0 | | | | 3 | | 3 | | | | | 3 | | | | | | 3 | 12 | 2 | | 2 | 20 |
| 3 | (Sweden) (5) Antonio Lindbäck | | 1 | | | 3 | | | | | 2 | | | | | 2 | | | | | 2 | 10 | | 3 | 1 | 18 |
| 4 | (Denmark) (15) Nicki Pedersen | | | | 3 | | | 2 | | | 3 | | | | | | 0 | 3 | | | | 11 | 3 | | 0 | 16 |
| 5 | (Australia) (10) Jason Crump | | | 3 | | | 1 | | | | | | 3 | | | 3 | | 2 | | | | 12 | | 0 | | 12 |
| 6 | (Sweden) (14) Andreas Jonsson | | | | f | | 3 | | | | | 1 | | 3 | | | | | | | 1 | 8 | 1 | | | 8 |
| 7 | (Denmark) (9) Hans Andersen | | | 2 | | 1 | | | | | | 0 | | | | | 2 | | 3 | | | 8 | 0 | | | 8 |
| 8 | (Poland) (16) Jarosław Hampel | | | | 1 | | | | 3 | 2 | | | | | | 1 | | | 1 | | | 8 | | 1 | | 8 |
| 9 | (Australia) (3) Leigh Adams | 2 | | | | | | 0 | | | | 3 | | | | 0 | | | | 2 | | 7 | | | | 7 |
| 10 | (Denmark) (7) Niels Kristian Iversen | | 2 | | | | | 1 | | | | | x | 2 | | | | | 2 | | | 7 | | | | 7 |
| 11 | (Poland) (13) Tomasz Gollob | | | | 2 | 0 | | | | | | | 2 | | 1 | | | | | 1 | | 6 | | | | 6 |
| 12 | (England) (2) Lee Richardson | 3 | | | | | 0 | | | | 1 | | | | 2 | | | | 0 | | | 6 | | | | 6 |
| 13 | (Australia) (1) Ryan Sullivan | 0 | | | | 2 | | | | 1 | | | | 1 | | | | 1 | | | | 5 | | | | 5 |
| 14 | (England) (8) Scott Nicholls | | 0 | | | | | | 2 | | | 2 | | | 0 | | | f | | | | 4 | | | | 4 |
| 15 | (Denmark) (4) Bjarne Pedersen | 1 | | | | | | | 0 | | | | 1 | | | | 1 | | | | 0 | 3 | | | | 3 |
| 16 | (Poland) (12) Tomasz Chrzanowski | | | 1 | | | | | 1 | | 0 | | | 0 | | | | | | 0 | | 2 | | | | 2 |
| R1 | (Denmark) (R1) Charlie Gjedde | | | | | | | | | | | | | | | | | | | | | 0 | R1 | | | |
| R2 | (Denmark) (R2) Mads Korneliussen | | | | | | | | | | | | | | | | | | | | | 0 | R2 | | | |

m - exclusion for exceeding two minute time allowance • t - exclusion for touching the tapes • x - other exclusion • e - retired or mechanical failure • f - fell • ns - non-starter • nc - non-classify

| gate A - inside | gate B | gate C | gate D - outside |
