= 2001 Speedway Grand Prix =

World championship speedway season

Season details
- Dates: 5 May – 29 September
- Events: 6
- Cities: 6
- Countries: 6
- Riders: 22 permanents 2 wild card(s)
- Heats: 144 (in 6 events)

Winners
- Champion: SWE Tony Rickardsson
- Runner-up: AUS Jason Crump
- 3rd place: POL Tomasz Gollob

The 2001 Speedway Grand Prix was the 56th edition of the official World Championship and the seventh season in the Speedway Grand Prix era and is used to determine the Speedway World Champion.

== Event format ==
The system first used in 1998 continued to be adopted with 24 riders, divided into two classes. The eight best would be directly qualified for the "Main Event", while the sixteen others would be knocked out if they finished out of the top two in 4-man heats on two occasions – while they would go through if they finished inside the top two on two occasions. This resulted in 10 heats, where eight proceeded to the Main Event, where exactly the same system was applied to give eight riders to a semi-final.

The semi-finals were then two heats of four, where the top two qualified for a final and the last two going towards the consolation final. The 4 finalists scored 25, 20, 18 and 16 points, with 5th to 8th scoring 15, 14, 12 and 10-point, and after that 8, 8, 7, 7, etc. Places after 8th place were awarded according to the time a rider was knocked out and, secondly, according to position in the last heat he rode in.

== Qualification ==
The 2001 season had 22 permanent riders and two wild cards at each event. The permanent riders are highlighted in the results table below.

Joe Screen had also qualified as a permanent rider for the 2001 season however as a result of injury he did not take part in any Grand Prix. He was replaced by first reserve, Henrik Gustafsson.

== Calendar ==
Round	Date	City and venue	Winner	Runner-up	3rd placed	4th placed	Results
1	5 May	(Germany) Berlin , Germany; F. L. Jahn Stadium	(Poland) Tomasz Gollob	(Sweden) Henrik Gustafsson	(Denmark) Nicki Pedersen	(Sweden) Tony Rickardsson	results
2	9 June	(United Kingdom) Cardiff , Great Britain; Millennium Stadium	(Sweden) Tony Rickardsson	(Australia) Jason Crump	(Poland) Tomasz Gollob	(Sweden) Niklas Klingberg	results
3	28 July	(Denmark) Vojens , Denmark; Speedway Center	(Sweden) Tony Rickardsson	(Australia) Jason Crump	(Australia) Leigh Adams	(Poland) Tomasz Gollob	results
4	18 August	(Czech Republic) Prague , Czech Republic; Markéta Stadium	(United States) Billy Hamill	(Sweden) Tony Rickardsson	(Australia) Jason Crump	(Poland) Tomasz Gollob	results
5	8 September	(Poland) Bydgoszcz , Poland; Polonia Stadium	(Australia) Jason Crump	(Sweden) Tony Rickardsson	(Sweden) Mikael Karlsson	(United States) Billy Hamill	results
6	29 September	(Sweden) Stockholm , Sweden; Stockholms Stadion	(Australia) Jason Crump	(Sweden) Mikael Karlsson	(Australia) Ryan Sullivan	(United Kingdom) Mark Loram	results

== Final standings ==
Qualifies for next season's Grand Prix series
Full-time Grand Prix rider
Wild card, track reserve or qualified reserve

Pos.	Rider	Points	GER (Germany)	GBR (United Kingdom)	DEN (Denmark)	CZE (Czech Republic)	POL (Poland)	SWE (Sweden)
Gold	(Sweden) (3) Tony Rickardsson	121	16	25	25	20	20	15
Silver	(Australia) (4) Jason Crump	113	5	20	20	18	25	25
Bronze	(Poland) (7) Tomasz Gollob	89	25	18	16	16	8	6
4	(Australia) (9) Ryan Sullivan	80	10	15	8	15	14	18
5	(Australia) (6) Leigh Adams	69	12	8	18	10	7	14
6	(United States) (2) Billy Hamill	61	5	3	4	25	16	8
7	(Sweden) (15) Mikael Karlsson	59	2	2	12	5	18	20
8	(Australia) (8) Todd Wiltshire	56	14	14	14	6	3	5
9	(United Kingdom) (1) Mark Loram	54	6	8	5	7	12	16
10	(Sweden) (21) Niklas Klingberg	54	4	16	15	8	4	7
11	(Denmark) (13) Nicki Pedersen	52	18	7	7	6	8	6
12	(United Kingdom) (12) Carl Stonehewer	46	7	5	4	12	6	12
13	(United States) (5) Greg Hancock	43	8	6	5	4	10	10
14	(Norway) (14) Rune Holta	41	1	2	10	8	15	5
15	(Sweden) (11) Peter Karlsson	39	15	–	8	2	6	8
16	(Poland) (26) Grzegorz Walasek	34	–	10	6	14	4	–
17	(Sweden) (25) Henrik Gustafsson	33	20	3	2	3	2	3
18	(Denmark) (19) Brian Andersen	23	8	5	3	4	1	2
19	(Slovenia) (22) Matej Ferjan	21	7	7	1	2	3	1
20	(Poland) (16) Piotr Protasiewicz	20	4	6	1	5	2	2
21	(Sweden) (17) Jimmy Nilsen	20	1	12	7	–	–	–
22	(United Kingdom) (20) Andy Smith	12	3	1	2	1	1	4
23	(Czech Republic) (23) (27) Antonín Kasper Jr.	11	–	–	–	3	5	3
24	(Czech Republic) (24) Bohumil Brhel	7	–	–	–	7	–	–
25	(Poland) (24) Jarosław Hampel	7	–	–	–	–	7	–
26	(Sweden) (24) Andreas Jonsson	7	–	–	–	–	–	7
27	(United Kingdom) (10) Chris Louis	6	3	1	–	1	–	1
28	(Germany) (23) Robert Barth	6	6	–	–	–	–	–
29	(Denmark) (23) Hans Clausen	6	–	–	6	–	–	–
30	(Poland) (23) Krzysztof Cegielski	5	–	–	–	–	5	–
31	(United Kingdom) (23) Martin Dugard	4	–	4	–	–	–	–
32	(Sweden) (23) Stefan Andersson	4	–	–	–	–	–	4
33	(United Kingdom) (24) Scott Nicholls	4	–	4	–	–	–	–
34	(Denmark) (24) Jesper B. Jensen	3	–	–	3	–	–	–
35	(Germany) (24) Mirko Wolter	2	2	–	–	–	–	–
Rider(s) not classified
	(United Kingdom) (18) Joe Screen	—	–	–	–	–	–	–
Pos.	Rider	Points	GER (Germany)	GBR (United Kingdom)	DEN (Denmark)	CZE (Czech Republic)	POL (Poland)	SWE (Sweden)
