= 2005 Speedway Grand Prix of Scandinavia =

Speedway Grand Prix event

- Venue: G&B Stadium
- Location: Målilla, (Sweden)
- Start date: 13 August 2005
- Competitors: 16 (2 reserves)

The 2005 Speedway Grand Prix of Scandinavia was the seventh round of the 2005 Speedway Grand Prix season (the world championship). It took place on 13 August 2005 at the G&B Stadium in Målilla, Sweden.

It was the fourth time that the Speedway Grand Prix of Scandinavia was held, and it was won by Australian rider Jason Crump marking his 12th career Grand Prix win.

== Grand Prix result ==
Placing	Rider	1	2	3	4	5	6	7	8	9	10	11	12	13	14	15	16	17	18	19	20	Pts	SF1	SF2	Final	GP Pts
1	(Australia) (7) Jason Crump		3					3					3	2					2			13		3	3	25
2	(Sweden) (12) Andreas Jonsson			1					3		3			3						3		13	3		2	20
3	(Sweden) (16) Tony Rickardsson				2				2	1						3			3			11		2	1	18
4	(Australia) (8) Leigh Adams		0						1			3			3			2				9	2		0	16
5	(Denmark) (11) Nicki Pedersen			3				2		3					x						2	10	0			10
6	(England) (6) Scott Nicholls		1				3			2							3			1		10		1		10
7	(Poland) (2) Tomasz Gollob	2					2				2				2				1			9	1			9
8	(United States) (5) Greg Hancock		2			2					1					0					3	8		0		8
9	(Denmark) (15) Bjarne Pedersen				3			1			0						0	3				7				7
10	(Sweden) (10) Antonio Lindbäck			2			1						1			2		1				7				7
11	(Australia) (14) Ryan Sullivan				1		0					2		1							1	5				5
12	(Denmark) (3) Hans Andersen	1						0				1				1				2		5				5
13	(Poland) (9) Jarosław Hampel			0		3						0					2		0			5				5
14	(Sweden) (13) Jonas Davidsson				0	1							2		1					0		4				4
15	(England) (1) Lee Richardson	3				0				0				0				0				3				3
16	(Poland) (4) Tomasz Chrzanowski	0							0				0				1				0	1				1
R1	(Sweden) (R1) Peter Ljung																					0	R1			
R2	(Sweden) (R2) Freddie Lindgren																					0	R2			

m - exclusion for exceeding two minute time allowance • t - exclusion for touching the tapes • x - other exclusion • e - retired or mechanical failure • f - fell • ns - non-starter • nc - non-classify

gate A - inside	gate B	gate C	gate D - outside
