= 2005 Speedway Grand Prix of Poland =

Speedway Grand Prix event

- Venue: Polonia Stadium
- Location: Bydgoszcz, (Poland)
- Start date: 27 August 2005
- Competitors: 16 (2 reserves)

The 2005 Speedway Grand Prix of Poland was the eighth round of the 2005 Speedway Grand Prix season (the world championship). It took place on 27 August 2005 at the Polonia Stadium in Bydgoszcz, Poland.

It was the 12th time that the Speedway Grand Prix of Poland had been held.

The Grand Prix was by the Polish rider Tomasz Gollob (his 10th career Grand Prix win and the 7th time that Gollob had won the Polish Grand Prix).

== Grand Prix result ==
Placing	Rider	1	2	3	4	5	6	7	8	9	10	11	12	13	14	15	16	17	18	19	20	Pts	SF1	SF2	Final	GP Pts
1	(Poland) (14) Tomasz Gollob				3		3					2		3							2	13	3		3	25
2	(England) (5) Lee Richardson		0			0					3					2					3	8		3	2	20
3	(Australia) (1) Jason Crump	3				2				2				0				2				9	2		1	18
4	(United States) (13) Greg Hancock				2	3							3		3					1		12		2	0	16
5	(Australia) (8) Leigh Adams		3						0			3			2			3				11		1		11
6	(Poland) (7) Piotr Protasiewicz		2					2					2	2					3			11	0			11
7	(Sweden) (12) Andreas Jonsson			2					3		2			1						2		10		0		10
8	(Denmark) (6) Nicki Pedersen		1				2			0							3			3		9	1			9
9	(England) (16) Scott Nicholls				1				2	3						1			1			8				8
10	(Sweden) (10) Tony Rickardsson			3			1						0			3		1				8				8
11	(Denmark) (4) Bjarne Pedersen	2							1				1				2				1	7				7
12	(Poland) (9) Jarosław Hampel			1		1						1					1		2			6				6
13	(Denmark) (11) Hans Andersen			0				3		1					1						0	5				5
14	(Australia) (2) Ryan Sullivan	1					0				1				0				0			2				2
15	(Poland) (15) Tomasz Chrzanowski				0			1			0						0	0				1				1
16	(Sweden) (3) Antonio Lindbäck	0						0				0				0				0		0				0
R1	(Poland) (R1) Krzysztof Kasprzak																					0	R1			
R2	(Poland) (R2) Karol Ząbik																					0	R2			

m - exclusion for exceeding two minute time allowance • t - exclusion for touching the tapes • x - other exclusion • e - retired or mechanical failure • f - fell • ns - non-starter • nc - non-classify

gate A - inside	gate B	gate C	gate D - outside
