= 2001 Danish speedway season =

Season of speedway in Denmark

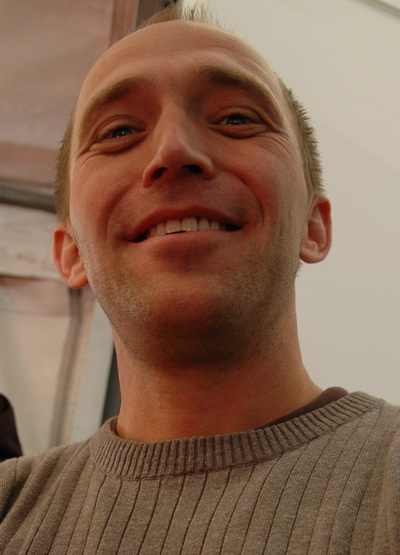
- Hans Clausen won the Danish title.

The 2001 Danish speedway season was the 2001 season of motorcycle speedway in Denmark.

== Individual ==
=== Individual Championship ===
The 2001 Danish Individual Speedway Championship was the 2001 edition of the Danish Individual Speedway Championship. The final was at Outrup on 18 May. The title was won by Hans Clausen. The Championship formed part of the 2002 Speedway Grand Prix Qualification with 5 riders qualifying for the Scandinavian Final.

Final

Pos.	Rider	Team	Total	Race off
1	Hans Clausen	Outrup	14	
2	Bjarne Pedersen	Kaparna	12	
3	Jesper B. Jensen	Holsted	11	3
4	Claus Kristensen	Herning	11	2
5	Nicki Pedersen	Brovst	10	
6	Charlie Gjedde	Holsted	9	3
7	Kenneth Bjerre	Herning	9	2
8	Brian Andersen	Herning	8	
9	Ronni Pedersen	Slangerup	7	
10	Gert Handberg	Brovst	7	
11	Brian Karger	Slangerup	7	
12	Hans Andersen	Brovst	5	
13	Tom P. Madsen	Holsted	3	
14	Ronnie Henningsen	Herning	3	
15	Henning Bager	Holsted	1	
16	Mads Korneliussen	Slangerup	1	

Key - Each heat has four riders, 3 points for a heat win, 2 for 2nd, 1 for third and 0 for last

=== Junior Championship ===
The 2001 Junior Championship was the last in regard to the age limit and name of the event, as from 2002 it would be known as the Under 21 Championship. The final was held at Holsted on 19 August. Sabrina Bogh won the Junior Championship.

== Team ==
=== Danish Open Speedway League ===
The 2001 season was won by Outrup for the third time.

The league was called the Danish Open league for the season because of the involvement of teams from outside Denmark. The change had come about because Holstebro and Odense had resigned from the Danish Superliga for financial reasons.

The league contained two teams from outside Denmark, Kaparna from Sweden and MC Güstrow from Germany.

Pos	Team	P	W	2nd	3rd	Pts
1	Holsted	9	5	2	2	21
2	Outrup	9	4	4	1	21
3	Brovst	9	3	4	2	19
4	Herning	9	3	4	2	17
5	Slangerup	9	3	2	4	17
6	(Sweden) Kaparna	9	3	2	4	17
7	(Germany) MC Güstrow	9	0	3	6	12

Play offs

- 1 Outrup 38, Holsted 38, Brovst 32
- 2 Outrup 39, Brovst 35, Holsted 34
- 3 Outrup 43, Holsted 35, Brovst 30

Pos	Team	P	W	2nd	3rd	Pts
1	Outrup	3	3	0	0	9
2	Holsted	3	0	2	1	6
3	Brovst	3	0	1	2	4

=== Teams ===
Brovst

- Nicki Pedersen
- Hans Andersen
- Gert Handberg
- Ulrich Ostergaard
- Antonín Kasper Jr.
- Tomasz Chrzanowski
- Martin Greve
- Steen Jensen
- Karol Melecha
- Tomasz Bajerski

Güstrow

- Piotr Świst
- Sławomir Drabik
- Roman Chromik
- Robert Flis
- Paw Mauski
- Ralf Baumann
- Marco Müller

Herning

- Brian Andersen
- Anders Martini
- Sebastian Ulamek
- Kristian Andersen
- Kenneth Bjerre
- Mariusz Staszewski
- Grzegorz Rempała
- Robert Dados
- Rune Knudsen
- Claus Kristensen
- Ronnie Rene Henningsen

Holsted

- Jesper B. Jensen
- Henning Bager
- Matthias Kröger
- Niels Kristian Iversen
- Flemming Jacobsen
- John Jørgensen
- Charlie Gjedde
- Adam Skórnicki
- Tom P. Madsen
- Mariusz Frankow

Outrup

- Hans Clausen
- Frede Schött
- Rune Holta
- Jesper Steentoft
- Kai Laukkanen
- Kristian Lund
- Steven R. Andersen
- Róbert Nagy

Slangerup

- Brian Karger
- Ronni Pedersen
- Jesper Olsen
- Peder Fredriksen
- Mads Korneliussen
- Mads B. Pedersen
- Bo Christian Nielsen
- Peder Pedersen
- Jan Stæchmann
- Matej Ferjan
- Marek Hućko
- Carsten Hansen
- Jan Andersen
