= 2005 Speedway Grand Prix of Sweden =

Speedway Grand Prix event

- Venue: Smedstadion
- Location: Eskilstuna, (Sweden)
- Start date: 11 May 2005
- Competitors: 16 (2 reserves)

The 2005 Speedway Grand Prix of Sweden was the second round of the 2005 Speedway Grand Prix season (the world championship). It took place on 11 May 2005 at the Smedstadion in Eskilstuna, Sweden.

It was the 11th time that the Speedway Grand Prix of Sweden had been held.

The Grand Prix was by the Australian rider Jason Crump (his 11th career Grand Prix win).

== Grand Prix result ==
Placing	Rider	1	2	3	4	5	6	7	8	9	10	11	12	13	14	15	16	17	18	19	20	Pts	SF1	SF2	Final	GP Pts
1	(Australia) (4) Jason Crump	2							3				3				0				2	10		2	3	25
2	(Sweden) (6) Tony Rickardsson		0				3			3							3			2		11	3		2	20
3	(Denmark) (13) Bjarne Pedersen				2	3							2		3					3		13	2		1	18
4	(Denmark) (5) Nicki Pedersen		3			2					2					3					3	13		3	f	16
5	(Australia) (2) Leigh Adams	3					2				3				2				3			13		0		13
6	(Sweden) (8) Antonio Lindbäck		2						1			2			0			3				8	1			8
7	(Denmark) (11) Hans Andersen			2				3		2					1						0	8		1		8
8	(Denmark) (15) Kenneth Bjerre				3			2			0						2	1				8	0			8
9	(England) (16) Scott Nicholls				t				2	1						2			2			7				7
10	(United States) (14) Greg Hancock				1		1					3		0							1	6				6
11	(Poland) (7) Tomasz Gollob		1					0					1	3					1			6				6
12	(Norway) (1) Rune Holta	1				1				0				2				2				6				6
13	(Poland) (10) Tomasz Chrzanowski			3			0						0			1		0				4				4
14	(England) (3) Lee Richardson	0						1				1				0				1		3				3
15	(Australia) (12) Ryan Sullivan			1					0		1			1						0		3				3
16	(Sweden) (9) Andreas Jonsson			0		0						t					1		0			1				1
R1	(Sweden) (R1) Mikael Max				0																	0	R1			
R2	(Sweden) (R2) Peter Nahlin											0										0	R2			

m - exclusion for exceeding two minute time allowance • t - exclusion for touching the tapes • x - other exclusion • e - retired or mechanical failure • f - fell • ns - non-starter • nc - non-classify

gate A - inside	gate B	gate C	gate D - outside
