= 2005 Speedway Grand Prix of Italy =

Speedway Grand Prix event

- Venue: Santa Marina Stadium
- Location: Lonigo, (Italy)
- Start date: 9 September 2005
- Competitors: 16 (2 reserves)

The 2005 Speedway Grand Prix of Italy (sponsored by Fiat vans) was the ninth and final round of the 2005 Speedway Grand Prix season (the world championship). It took place on 9 September 2005 at the Santa Marina Stadium in Lonigo, (Italy).

It was the second time that the Speedway Grand Prix of Italy had been held but the first since 1996.

The Grand Prix was by the Swedish rider Tony Rickardsson (his 20th and last career Grand Prix win) and sixth of the 2005 season.

== Grand Prix result ==
Placing	Rider	1	2	3	4	5	6	7	8	9	10	11	12	13	14	15	16	17	18	19	20	Pts	SF1	SF2	Final	GP Pts
1	(Sweden) (14) Tony Rickardsson				3		3					3		3							3	15	3		3	25
2	(Australia) (15) Jason Crump				2			3			3						1	3				12		3	2	20
3	(United States) (10) Greg Hancock			3			1						1			2		1				8	2		1	18
4	(Australia) (9) Leigh Adams			1		2						2					3		3			11		2	0	16
5	(Sweden) (1) Andreas Jonsson	1				3				2				2				2				10		f		10
6	(Denmark) (6) Bjarne Pedersen		1				2			3							2			2		10	0			10
7	(Denmark) (7) Hans Andersen		2					2					2	1					1			8	1			8
8	(England) (13) Scott Nicholls				e	x							3		3					0		6		1		6
9	(England) (5) Lee Richardson		0			1					2					1					2	6				6
10	(Poland) (8) Tomasz Chrzanowski		3						2			1			0			0				6				6
11	(Denmark) (4) Nicki Pedersen	2							3				0				0				x	5				5
12	(Sweden) (16) Antonio Lindbäck				1				0	1						3			t			5				5
13	(Sweden) (3) Stefan Andersson	3						1				0				0				1		5				5
14	(Slovenia) (11) Matej Žagar			2				f		0					2						1	5				5
15	(Poland) (2) Tomasz Gollob	0					0				1				1				2			4				4
16	(Russia) (12) Roman Povazhny			0					1		0			0						3		4				4
R1	(Italy) (R1) Daniele Tessari																		0			0	R1			
R2	(Italy) (R2) Simone Terenzani																					0	R2			

m - exclusion for exceeding two minute time allowance • t - exclusion for touching the tapes • x - other exclusion • e - retired or mechanical failure • f - fell • ns - non-starter • nc - non-classify

gate A - inside	gate B	gate C	gate D - outside
