= Hans Clausen =

Danish speedway rider (born 1971)

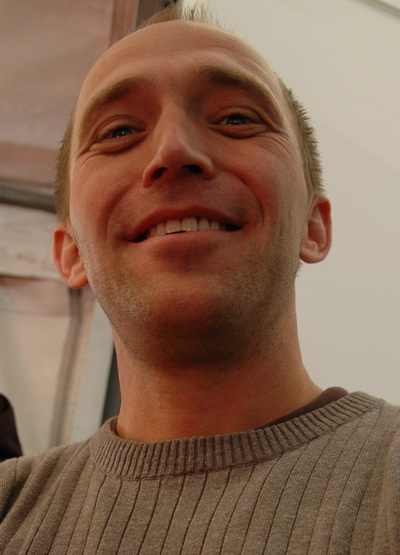
- Born: 2 July 1971 (age 55); Denmark
- Nationality: Danish

Career history

Denmark
- 2000–2001: Outrup

Great Britain
- 1993–1997, 2002: Peterborough Panthers

Poland
- 1999: Opole
- 2000–2001: Ostrów
- 2002: Grudziądz

Sweden
- 2001: Nässjö

Individual honours
- 2001: Danish Champion

Hans Clausen (born 2 July 1971) is a former international motorcycle speedway rider from Denmark. He earned eight caps for the Denmark national speedway team.

== Career ==
Clausen rode in the British leagues for Peterborough Panthers, from 1993 to 1997 and again in 2002.

Clausen rode in 2001 Speedway Grand Prix of Denmark and 2001 Speedway World Cup. He won Individual Speedway Danish Championship in 2001.

Since 2006, Clausen is the team manager and chief mechanic of Danish Renault Clio Cup team, DanAgro Racing.

== Speedway Grand Prix results ==
2001 Speedway Grand Prix Final Championship standings (Riding No 23)
Race no.	Grand Prix	Pos.	Pts.	Heats	Draw No
3 /6	(Denmark) Danish SGP	13	6	(1,2,3) (0,1)	23

permanent speedway rider
wild card, track reserve or qualified reserve
rider not classified (track reserve who did not start)

== See also ==
- Denmark national speedway team
- List of Speedway Grand Prix riders
