= 2005 Speedway Grand Prix of Slovenia =

Speedway Grand Prix event

- Venue: Matija Gubec Stadium
- Location: Krško, (Slovenia)
- Start date: 28 May 2005
- Competitors: 16 (2 reserves)

The 2005 Speedway Grand Prix of Slovenia was the third round of the 2005 Speedway Grand Prix season (the world championship). It took place on 28 May 2005 at the Matija Gubec Stadium in Krško, (Slovenia).

It was the fourth time that the Speedway Grand Prix of Slovenia had been held.

The Grand Prix was by the Swedish rider Tony Rickardsson (his 16th career Grand Prix win).

== Grand Prix result ==
Placing	Rider	1	2	3	4	5	6	7	8	9	10	11	12	13	14	15	16	17	18	19	20	Pts	SF1	SF2	Final	GP Pts
1	(Sweden) (12) Tony Rickardsson			2					3		3			3						2		13		2	3	25
2	(Denmark) (15) Nicki Pedersen				3			3			2						3	0				11	2		2	20
3	(Slovenia) (6) Matej Žagar		2				2			3							2			0		9	3		1	18
4	(Australia) (7) Jason Crump		3					2					3	1					3			12		3	0	16
5	(Australia) (13) Ryan Sullivan				2	3							2		3					3		13	0			13
6	(Poland) (8) Tomasz Gollob		1						2			2			2			3				10		0		10
7	(Denmark) (1) Hans Andersen	2				1				2				2				2				9		1		9
8	(Australia) (11) Leigh Adams			2				1		1					1						3	8	1			8
9	(England) (3) Scott Nicholls	1						0				3				3				1		8				8
10	(United States) (10) Greg Hancock			1			3						1			2		1				8				8
11	(Denmark) (2) Kenneth Bjerre	3					1				0				0				0			4				4
12	(Sweden) (14) Antonio Lindbäck				1		0					0		0							2	3				3
13	(Denmark) (4) Bjarne Pedersen	0							1				0				1				1	3				3
14	(Sweden) (16) Andreas Jonsson				0				0	0						1			2			3				3
15	(England) (5) Lee Richardson		0			2					1					0					0	3				3
16	(Poland) (9) Tomasz Chrzanowski			0		0						1					0		1			2				2
R1	(Slovenia) (R1) Izak Šantej																					0	R1			
R2	(Slovenia) (R2) Denis Štojs																					0	R2			

m - exclusion for exceeding two minute time allowance • t - exclusion for touching the tapes • x - other exclusion • e - retired or mechanical failure • f - fell • ns - non-starter • nc - non-classify

gate A - inside	gate B	gate C	gate D - outside
