= 2005 Speedway Grand Prix =

World speedway championship season

Season details
- Dates: April 30 - September 9
- Events: 9
- Cities: 9
- Countries: 7
- Riders: 15 permanents 1 wild card(s); 2 track reserves
- Heats: 207 (in 9 events)

Winners
- Champion: SWE Tony Rickardsson
- Runner-up: AUS Jason Crump
- 3rd place: AUS Leigh Adams

The 2005 Speedway Grand Prix was the 60th edition of the official World Championship and the 11th season in the Speedway Grand Prix era used to determine the Speedway World Champion.

== Event format ==
The format was changed for GP 2005 with 16 riders (instead of 24) taking part in each Grand Prix event, and over the course of 20 heats each rider started in 5 heats and raced against every other rider once (which is the classical round-robin formula of the individual tournament). The top eight scorers advanced to two semi-final heats, and the first and second riders from each semi-final advanced to the GP final heat. All riders apart from the qualifiers for the final carried forward the points earned in the round-robin round over the course of the season. The riders in the final received points (for the whole tournament, irrespective of how many points they had earned) as follows:

- 1st place = 25 points
- 2nd place = 20 points
- 3rd place = 18 points
- 4th place = 16 points

This formula was very similar to that in effect during the 1995-1997 GP editions, the difference being such that then all the 16 riders after the 20 heat round-robin round started in one additional heat (those from places 13–16 after round-robin in 21st, 9–12 in 22nd, 5–8 in 23rd, 1–4 in 24th being the Great Final), and all 16 received a constant number of points for a given place in a tournament (irrespective of how many points they had earned).

== Qualification for Grand Prix ==
For the 2005 season, there were 15 permanent riders, joined at each Grand Prix by one wild card. They were, in rider number order:

- (1) Jason Crump (Australia)
- (2) Tony Rickardsson (Sweden)
- (3) Greg Hancock (United States)
- (4) Leigh Adams (Australia)
- (5) Nicki Pedersen (Denmark)
- (6) Tomasz Gollob (Poland)
- (7) Andreas Jonsson (Sweden)
- (8) Jarosław Hampel (Poland)
- (9) Hans Andersen (Denmark)
- (10) Bjarne Pedersen (Denmark)
- (11) Lee Richardson (United Kingdom)
- (12) Scott Nicholls (United Kingdom)
- (13) Ryan Sullivan (Australia)
- (14) Antonio Lindback (Sweden)
- (15) Tomasz Chrzanowski (Poland)

== Calendar ==
Round	Date	City and venue	Winner	Runner-up	3rd placed	4th placed	Results
1	30 April	Wrocław, Poland; Olympic Stadium	(Sweden) Tony Rickardsson	(Australia) Leigh Adams	(Australia) Jason Crump	(Sweden) Antonio Lindbäck	results
2	11 May	(Sweden) Eskilstuna, Sweden; Smedstadion	(Australia) Jason Crump	(Sweden) Tony Rickardsson	(Denmark) Bjarne Pedersen	(Denmark) Nicki Pedersen	results
3	28 May	(Slovenia) Krško, Slovenia; Matija Gubec Stadium	(Sweden) Tony Rickardsson	(Denmark) Nicki Pedersen	(Slovenia) Matej Žagar	(Australia) Jason Crump	results
4	11 June	(United Kingdom) Cardiff, Great Britain; Millennium Stadium	(Sweden) Tony Rickardsson	(Poland) Jarosław Hampel	(Denmark) Bjarne Pedersen	(Denmark) Hans N. Andersen	results
5	25 June	(Denmark) Copenhagen, Denmark; Parken Stadium	(Sweden) Tony Rickardsson	(United States) Greg Hancock	(Sweden) Antonio Lindbäck	(Denmark) Nicki Pedersen	results
6	29 July	(Czech Republic) Prague, Czech Republic; Markéta Stadium	(Sweden) Tony Rickardsson	(Denmark) Bjarne Pedersen	(Poland) Jarosław Hampel	(Australia) Jason Crump	results
7	13 August	Målilla , Sweden; G&B Stadium	(Australia) Jason Crump	(Sweden) Andreas Jonsson	(Sweden) Tony Rickardsson	(Australia) Leigh Adams	results
8	27 August	(Poland) Bydgoszcz, Poland; Polonia Stadium	(Poland) Tomasz Gollob	(United Kingdom) Lee Richardson	(Australia) Jason Crump	(United States) Greg Hancock	results
9	9 September	(Italy) Lonigo, Italy; Santa Marina Stadium	(Sweden) Tony Rickardsson	(Australia) Jason Crump	(United States) Greg Hancock	(Australia) Leigh Adams	results

Result: Europe • Sweden • Slovenia • Great Britain • Copenhagen • Denmark • Scandinavia • Poland • Italy

== Final classification ==
Qualifies for next season's Grand Prix series
Full-time Grand Prix rider
Wild card, track reserve or qualified reserve

Pos.	Rider	Points	EUR (Poland)	SWE (Sweden)	SVN (Slovenia)	GBR (United Kingdom)	DEN (Denmark)	CZE (Czech Republic)	SCA (Sweden)	POL (Poland)	ITA (Italy)
Gold	(Sweden) (2) Tony Rickardsson	196	25	20	25	25	25	25	18	8	25
Silver	(Australia) (1) Jason Crump	154	18	25	16	4	12	16	25	18	20
Bronze	(Australia) (4) Leigh Adams	106	20	13	8	7	7	8	16	11	16
4	(Denmark) (5) Nicki Pedersen	102	10	16	20	6	16	10	10	9	5
5	(United States) (3) Greg Hancock	100	11	6	8	6	20	7	8	16	18
6	(Denmark) (10) Bjarne Pedersen	90	4	18	3	18	3	20	7	7	10
7	(Poland) (6) Tomasz Gollob	83	6	6	10	8	6	9	9	25	4
8	(Sweden) (7) Andreas Jonsson	80	8	1	3	12	8	8	20	10	10
9	(United Kingdom) (12) Scott Nicholls	72	6	7	8	9	4	14	10	8	6
10	(Sweden) (14) Antonio Lindbäck	71	16	8	3	8	18	6	7	0	5
11	(Poland) (8) Jarosław Hampel	67	10	–	–	20	8	18	5	6	–
12	(Denmark) (9) Hans N. Andersen	64	2	8	9	16	8	3	5	5	8
13	(United Kingdom) (11) Lee Richardson	55	5	3	3	5	6	4	3	20	6
14	(Australia) (13) Ryan Sullivan	45	7	3	13	1	5	9	5	2	–
15	(Poland) (15) Tomasz Chrzanowski	28	4	4	2	7	2	1	1	1	6
16	(Slovenia) (16) Matej Žagar	23	–	–	18	–	–	–	–	–	5
17	(Denmark) (19) Kenneth Bjerre	12	–	8	4	–	–	–	–	–	–
18	(Poland) (16) Piotr Protasiewicz	11	–	–	–	–	–	–	–	11	–
19	(Denmark) (16) Niels Kristian Iversen	7	–	–	–	–	7	–	–	–	–
20	(Norway) (16) Rune Holta	6	–	6	–	–	–	–	–	–	–
21	(Sweden) (21) Stefan Andersson	5	–	–	–	–	–	–	–	–	5
22	(Poland) (16) (17) Krzysztof Kasprzak	4	4	–	–	–	–	–	–	ns	–
23	(United Kingdom) (16) David Norris	4	–	–	–	4	–	–	–	–	–
24	(Sweden) (16) Jonas Davidsson	4	–	–	–	–	–	–	4	–	–
25	(Russia) (23) Roman Povazhny	4	–	–	–	–	–	–	–	–	4
26	(Czech Republic) (16) Aleš Dryml, Jr.	3	–	–	–	–	–	3	–	–	–
27	(United Kingdom) (18) Edward Kennett	1	–	–	–	1	–	–	–	–	–
28	(Sweden) (17) Mikael Max	0	–	0	–	–	–	–	–	–	–
29	(United Kingdom) (17) Simon Stead	0	–	–	–	0	–	–	–	–	–
30	(Sweden) (18) Peter Nahlin	0	–	0	–	–	–	–	–	–	–
31	(Italy) (18) Daniele Tessari	0	–	–	–	–	–	–	–	–	0
Rider(s) not classified
	(Poland) (17) Janusz Kołodziej	ns	ns	-	-	-	-	-	-	-	-
	(Slovenia) (17) Izak Šantej	ns	-	-	ns	-	-	-	-	-	-
	(Denmark) (17) Charlie Gjedde	ns	-	-	-	-	ns	-	-	-	-
	(Czech Republic) (17) Bohumil Brhel	ns	-	-	-	-	-	ns	-	-	-
	(Sweden) (17) Peter Ljung	ns	-	-	-	-	-	-	ns	-	-
	(Italy) (17) Simone Terenzani	ns	-	-	-	-	-	-	-	-	ns
	(Poland) (18) Adrian Miedziński	ns	ns	-	-	-	-	-	-	-	-
	(Slovenia) (18) Denis Štojs	ns	-	-	ns	-	-	-	-	-	-
	(Denmark) (18) Mads Korneliussen	ns	-	-	-	-	ns	-	-	-	-
	(Czech Republic) (18) Lukáš Dryml	ns	-	-	-	-	-	ns	-	-	-
	(Sweden) (18) Fredrik Lindgren	ns	-	-	-	-	-	-	ns	-	-
	(Poland) (18) Karol Ząbik	ns	-	-	-	-	-	-	-	ns	-
Pos.	Rider	Points	EUR (Poland)	SWE (Sweden)	SVN (Slovenia)	GBR (United Kingdom)	DEN (Denmark)	CZE (Czech Republic)	SCA (Sweden)	POL (Poland)	ITA (Italy)
