= 2003 Speedway World Cup Event 1 =

Information
- Date: 3 August 2003
- City: Holsted
- Event: 1 of 5 (11)

SWC Results
Winner		Denmark - 62 pts
Runner-up		Czech Republic - 50 pts
3rd place		Finland - 32 pts
4th place		Germany - 10 pts

The 2003 Speedway World Cup Event 1 was the first race of the 2003 Speedway World Cup season. It took place on August 3, 2003 in Holsted, Denmark.

== Results ==
Pos.	National team	Pts.
1	Denmark	62
2	Czech Republic	50
3	Finland	32
4	Germany	10

== Heat details ==
Placing	Team / Rider Name	Total	1	2	3	4	5	6	7	8	9	10	11	12	13	14	15	16	17	18	19	20	21	22	23	24	25
1	Denmark	62	3	6	9	10	13	16	18	21	24	27	30	30	32	35	38	41	44	45	47	48	51	53	56	59	62
1	(1) Nicki Pedersen	15	3					3					3					3					3
1	(2) Niels Kristian Iversen	10		3					2					E					3					2
1	(3) Bjarne Pedersen	12			3					3					2					1					3
1	(4) Kenneth Bjerre	12				1					3					3					2					3
1	(5) Hans N. Andersen	13					3					3					3					1					3
2	Czech Republic	50	2	4	6	8	10	10	10	12	13	15	17	20	23	25	27	29	30	32	35	38	40	43	47	49	50
2	(1) Aleš Dryml, Jr.	8	2							2						2			1								1
2	(2) Lukáš Dryml	11		2							1						2	2		2			2
2	(3) Bohumil Brhel	15			2							2	2		3						3			3
2	(4) Tomáš Topinka	12				2		E						3								3			4J
2	(5) Josef Franc	4					2		0						-			-								2
Placing	Team / Rider Name	Total	1	2	3	4	5	6	7	8	9	10	11	12	13	14	15	16	17	18	19	20	21	22	23	24	25
3	Finland	32	1	1	1	4	4	8	11	12	14	15	16	18	19	20	20	21	23	26	26	28	28	29	29	30	32
3	(1) Kaj Laukkanen	9	1								2				1				2			2		1
3	(2) Kauko Nieminen	3		0								1				1		1							0
3	(3) Tomi Reima	1			0			-									0		-							1
3	(4) Joonas Kylmäkorpi	16				3		4J	3				1							3							2
3	(5) Juha Hautamäki	3					0			1				2							0		0
4	Germany	10	0	1	2	2	3	4	5	5	5	5	5	6	6	6	7	7	7	7	8	8	8	8	10	10	10
4	(1) Mirko Wolter	5	0						1								1				1				2J
4	(2) Martin Smolinski	1		1						E			0									0				0
4	(3) Ronny Weiss	2			1						0			1				0									0
4	(4) Matthias Schultz	0				0						0			0				0				0
4	(5) Christian Hefenbrock	2					1	1								0				0				0
Placing	Team / Rider Name	Total	1	2	3	4	5	6	7	8	9	10	11	12	13	14	15	16	17	18	19	20	21	22	23	24	25

M - exclusion for exceeding two minute time allowance • T - exclusion for touching the tapes • X - other exclusion • E - retired or mechanical failure • F - fell

Helmet colours was permanent for each teams (Red, Blue, White and Yellow/Black). Colours in diagrams means gate positions:
gate A – inside	gate B	gate C	gate D – outside

== See also ==
- 2003 Speedway World Cup
- motorcycle speedway
