= 2005 Speedway Grand Prix of Europe =

Speedway Grand Prix event

- Venue: Olympic Stadium
- Location: Wrocław, (Poland)
- Start date: 30 April 2005
- Competitors: 16 (2 reserves)

The 2005 Speedway Grand Prix of Europe was the first round of the 2005 Speedway Grand Prix season (the world championship). It took place on 30 April 2005 at the Olympic Stadium in Wrocław, Poland.

It was the fifth time that the Speedway Grand Prix of Europe had been held.

The Grand Prix was by the Swedish rider Tony Rickardsson (his 15th career Grand Prix win).

== Grand Prix result ==
Placing	Rider	1	2	3	4	5	6	7	8	9	10	11	12	13	14	15	16	17	18	19	20	Pts	SF1	SF2	Final	GP Pts
1	(Sweden) (15) Tony Rickardsson				3			3			3						3	3				15	3		3	25
2	(Australia) (2) Leigh Adams	1					3				2				2				1			9	2		2	20
3	(Australia) (9) Jason Crump			3		3						0					2		3			11		3	1	18
4	(Sweden) (13) Antonio Lindbäck				2	2							3		0					1		8		2	0	16
5	(United States) (11) Greg Hancock			2				2		3					1						3	11		0		11
6	(Denmark) (8) Nicki Pedersen		3						2			2			3			0				10		1		10
7	(Poland) (4) Jarosław Hampel	3							3				2				0				2	10	1			10
8	(Sweden) (12) Andreas Jonsson			0					1		1			3						3		8	0			8
9	(Australia) (1) Ryan Sullivan	2				1				1				1				2				7				7
10	(England) (5) Scott Nicholls		2			0					0					3					1	6				6
11	(Poland) (3) Tomasz Gollob	0						0				3				1				2		6				6
12	(England) (14) Lee Richardson				1		1					1		2							0	5				5
13	(Poland) (10) Tomasz Chrzanowski			1			2						0			0		1				4				4
14	(Poland) (7) Krzysztof Kasprzak		0					1					1	0					2			4				4
15	(Denmark) (6) Bjarne Pedersen		1				0			2							1			0		4				4
16	(Denmark) (16) Hans Andersen				0				0	0						2			0			2				2
R1	(Poland) (R1) Janusz Kołodziej																					0	R1			
R2	(Poland) (R2) Adrian Miedziński																					0	R2			

m - exclusion for exceeding two minute time allowance • t - exclusion for touching the tapes • x - other exclusion • e - retired or mechanical failure • f - fell • ns - non-starter • nc - non-classify

gate A - inside	gate B	gate C	gate D - outside
