= 2005 Speedway Grand Prix of Great Britain =

Speedway Grand Prix event

- Venue: Millennium Stadium
- Location: Cardiff, (Wales)
- Start date: 11 June 2005
- Competitors: 16 (2 reserves)

The 2005 Speedway Grand Prix of Great Britain was the fourth round of the 2005 Speedway Grand Prix season (the world championship). It took place on 11 June 2005 at the Millennium Stadium in Cardiff, Wales.

It was the 11th time that the Speedway Grand Prix of Great Britain had been held.

The Grand Prix was by the Swedish rider Tony Rickardsson (his 17th career Grand Prix win and third of the 2005 campaign).

== Grand Prix result ==
Placing	Rider	1	2	3	4	5	6	7	8	9	10	11	12	13	14	15	16	17	18	19	20	Pts	SF1	SF2	Final	GP Pts
1	(Sweden) (12) Tony Rickardsson			3					3		2			2						2		12		2	3	25
2	(Poland) (1) Jarosław Hampel	3				1				3				3				2				12		3	2	20
3	(Denmark) (3) Bjarne Pedersen	1						2				3				2				0		8	3		1	18
4	(Denmark) (6) Hans Andersen		2				3			1							3			1		10	2		0	16
5	(Sweden) (13) Andreas Jonsson				3	2							3		1					3		12	0			12
6	(England) (5) Scott Nicholls		3			f					1					3					2	9		f		9
7	(Poland) (10) Tomasz Gollob			2			1						2			0		3				8		1		8
8	(Sweden) (7) Antonio Lindbäck		t					3					1	1					3			8	1			8
9	(Australia) (16) Leigh Adams				1				1	2						1			2			7				7
10	(Poland) (4) Tomasz Chrzanowski	0							2				0				2				3	7				7
11	(Denmark) (9) Nicki Pedersen			1		3						1					x		1			6				6
12	(United States) (15) Greg Hancock				2			t			3						1	0				6				6
13	(England) (14) Lee Richardson				0		2					2		0							1	5				5
14	(Australia) (2) Jason Crump	2					0				f				2				0			4				4
15	(England) (11) David Norris			0				1		0					3						0	4				4
16	(Australia) (8) Ryan Sullivan		1						0			0			ns			ns				1				1
R1	(England) (R1) Edward Kennett							0										1				1	R1			
R2	(England) (R2) Simon Stead		0												0							0	R2			

m - exclusion for exceeding two minute time allowance • t - exclusion for touching the tapes • x - other exclusion • e - retired or mechanical failure • f - fell • ns - non-starter • nc - non-classify

gate A - inside	gate B	gate C	gate D - outside
