= Lulkowo =

- Village
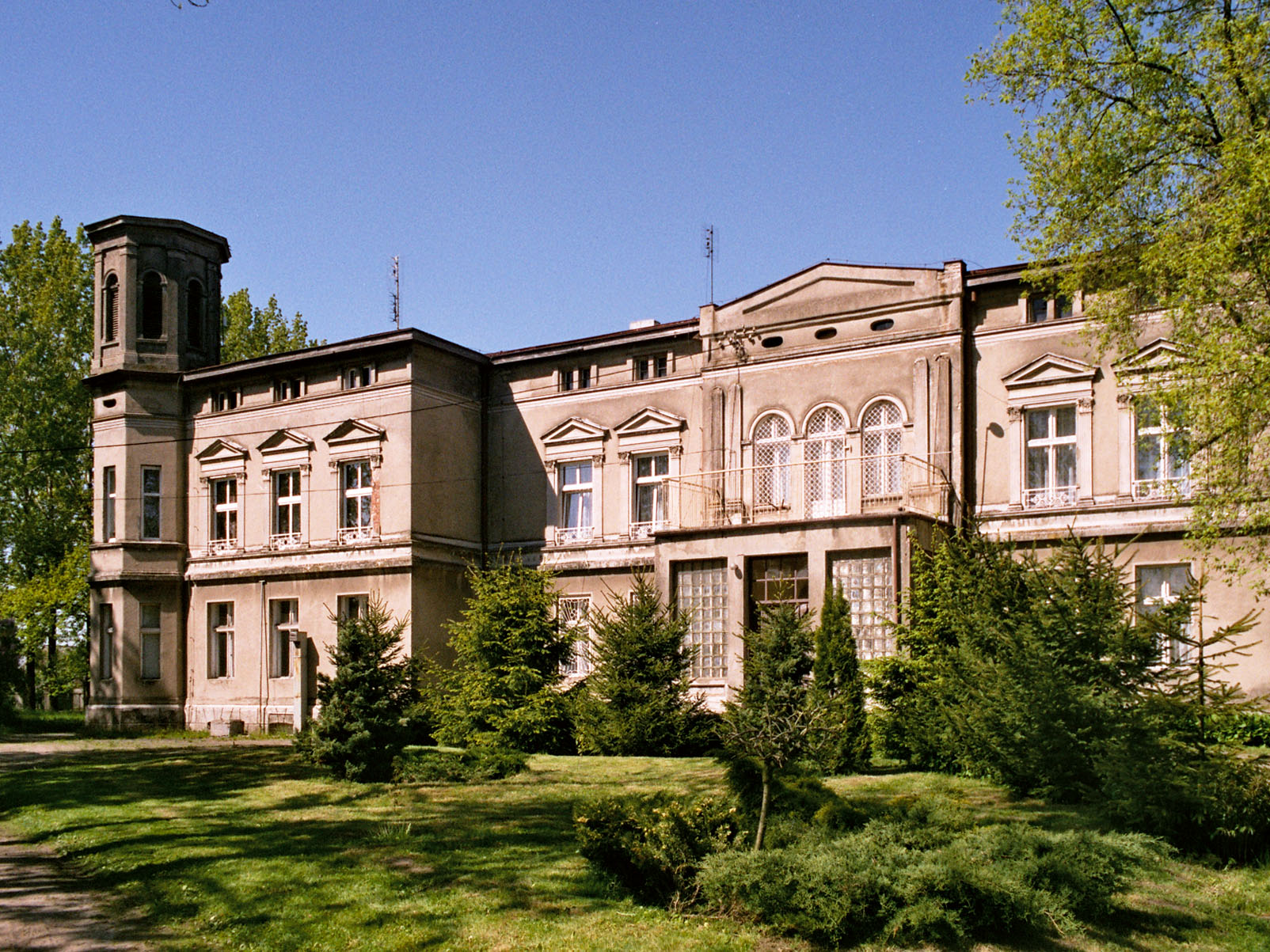
- Old palace

- Location within Poland
- Coordinates: 53°5′N 18°35′E
- Country: Poland
- Voivodeship: Kuyavian-Pomeranian
- County: Toruń
- Gmina: Łysomice
- Time zone: UTC+1 (CET)
  - Summer (DST): UTC+2 (CEST)
- Vehicle registration: CTR

Lulkowo [lulˈkɔvɔ] is a village in the administrative district of Gmina Łysomice, within Toruń County, Kuyavian-Pomeranian Voivodeship, in north-central Poland. It is about 10 kilometres (6.2 mi) north of Toruń. It is located in the Chełmno Land in the historic region of Pomerania.

During the German occupation (World War II), in November 1939, the German Selbstschutz murdered several Poles in the village as part of the Intelligenzaktion.

Polish motorcycle speedway rider Tomasz Chrzanowski was born in Lulkowo.
