= 2005 Speedway Grand Prix of Czech Republic =

- Venue: Markéta Stadium
- Location: Prague, (Czech Republic)
- Start date: 29 July 2005
- Competitors: 16 (2 reserves)

The 2005 Speedway Grand Prix of Czech Republic was the sixth round of the 2005 Speedway Grand Prix season (the world championship). It took place on 29 July 2005 at the Markéta Stadium in Prague, Czech Republic.

It was the ninth time that the Speedway Grand Prix of Czech Republic had been held.

The Grand Prix was by Swedish rider Tony Rickardsson (his 19th career Grand Prix win and fifth of the 2005 campaign).

== Grand Prix result ==
Placing	Rider	1	2	3	4	5	6	7	8	9	10	11	12	13	14	15	16	17	18	19	20	Pts	SF1	SF2	Final	GP Pts
1	(Sweden) (1) Tony Rickardsson	3				2				3				1				3				12		2	3	25
2	(Denmark) (11) Bjarne Pedersen			3				3		1					0						2	9	2		2	20
3	(Poland) (9) Jarosław Hampel			0		3						2					1		3			9	3		1	18
4	(Australia) (5) Jason Crump		2			0					1					2					3	8		3	0	16
5	(England) (12) Scott Nicholls			2					3		3			3						3		14	1			14
6	(Denmark) (13) Nicki Pedersen				3	1							2		2					2		10		0		10
7	(Poland) (7) Tomasz Gollob		3					0					3	2					1			9		1		9
8	(Australia) (14) Ryan Sullivan				2		3					3		0							1	9	0			9
9	(Australia) (2) Leigh Adams	1					2				0				3				2			8				8
10	(Sweden) (15) Andreas Jonsson				1			2			2						2	1				8				8
11	(United States) (10) Greg Hancock			1			1						0			3		2				7				7
12	(Sweden) (4) Antonio Lindbäck	2							0				1				3				x	6				6
13	(England) (8) Lee Richardson		0						2			1			1			0				4				4
14	(Denmark) (6) Hans Andersen		1				0			2							0			0		3				3
15	(Czech Republic) (3) Aleš Dryml, Jr.	0						1				f				1				1		3				3
16	(Poland) (16) Tomasz Chrzanowski				0				1	0						0			0			1				1
R1	(Czech Republic) (R1) Bohumil Brhel																					0	R1			
R2	(Czech Republic) (R2) Lukáš Dryml																					0	R2			

m - exclusion for exceeding two minute time allowance • t - exclusion for touching the tapes • x - other exclusion • e - retired or mechanical failure • f - fell • ns - non-starter • nc - non-classify

gate A - inside	gate B	gate C	gate D - outside
