= 2001 Speedway Grand Prix of Czech Republic =

Speedway Grand Prix event

- Venue: Markéta Stadium
- Location: Prague, (Czech Republic)
- Start date: 18 August 2001
- Competitors: 24

The 2001 Speedway Grand Prix of Czech Republic was the fourth round of the 2001 Speedway Grand Prix season (the world championship). It took place on 18 August 2001 at the Markéta Stadium in Prague, Czech Republic.

It was the fifth time that the Speedway Grand Prix of Czech Republic had been held.

The Grand Prix was won by American rider Billy Hamill (his 6th career Grand Prix win).

== Grand Prix result ==
Pos.	Rider	1	2	3	4	5	6	SF1	SF2	CF	Final	GP Points
1	(United States) Billy Hamill	2	2	3	2				2		3	25
2	(Sweden) Tony Rickardsson	3	3					3			2	20
3	(Australia) Jason Crump	2	1	2					3		1	18
4	(Poland) Tomasz Gollob	3	2					2			0	16
5	(Australia) Ryan Sullivan	2	3	3	1	3			0	3		15
6	(Poland) Grzegorz Walasek	3	2	2	0	2		1		2		14
7	(England) Carl Stonehewer	1	2	2	0	2	3	ef		1		12
8	(Australia) Leigh Adams	2	3						1	0		10
9	(Norway) Rune Holta	1	2	1								8
10	(Sweden) Niklas Klingberg	0	3	1								8
11	(England) Mark Loram	2	1	3	0	1						7
12	(Czech Republic) Bohumil Brhel	3	3	2	0	0						7
13	(Denmark) Nicki Pedersen	2	1	3	0	1						6
14	(Australia) Todd Wiltshire	1	1									6
15	(Sweden) Mikael Karlsson	1	0									5
16	(Poland) Piotr Protasiewicz	0	2	2	0	0						5
17	(United States) Greg Hancock	1	3	1								4
18	(Denmark) Brian Andersen	0	3	1								4
19	(Sweden) Henka Gustafsson	3	0	0								3
20	(Czech Republic) Antonín Kasper Jr.	3	0	0								3
21	(Slovenia) Matej Ferjan	1	1									2
22	(Sweden) Peter Karlsson	0	1									2
23	(England) Andy Smith	0	0									1
24	(England) Chris Louis	0	0									1

== Heat by heat ==
- Heat 01 Brhel, Sullivan, Stonehewer, Andersen
- Heat 02 Kasper, Hamill, Smith, P Karlsson (ef)
- Heat 03 Gustafsson, Pedersen, Hancock, Protasiewicz
- Heat 04 Walasek, Loram, Ferjan, Louis
- Heat 05 Hancock, Stonehewer, P Karlsson, Louis
- Heat 06 Andersen, Protasiewicz, Ferjan, Smith
- Heat 07 Brhel, Hamill, Loram, Gustafsson
- Heat 08 Sullivan, Walasek, Pedersen, Kasper
- Heat 09 Loram, Protasiewicz, Hancock, Kasper
- Heat 10 Pedersen, Stonehewer, Andersen, Gustafsson
- Heat 11 Rickardsson, Brhel, Holta, Stonehewer
- Heat 12 Sullivan, Crump, M Karlsson, Protasiewicz (ex)
- Heat 13 Hamill, Adams, Wiltshire, Pedersen
- Heat 14 Gollob, Walasek, Loram, Klingberg
- Heat 15 Klingberg, Holta, Wiltshire, Protasiewicz
- Heat 16 Loram, Stonehewer, Pedersen, M Karlsson
- Heat 17 Rickardsson, Hamill, Crump, Walasek
- Heat 18 Adams, Gollob, Sullivan, Brhel
- Heat 19 Stonehewer, Crump, Klingberg, Brhel (ef)
- Heat 20 Sullivan, Walasek, Holta, Loram
- Semi-finals
- Heat 21 Rickardsson, Gollob, Walasek, Stonehewer (ef)
- Heat 22 Crump, Hamill, Adams, Sullivan
- Consolation final
- Heat 23 Sullivan, Walasek, Stonehewer, Adams
- Final
- Heat 24 Hamill, Rickardsson, Crump, Gollob
