= 2001 Speedway Grand Prix of Poland =

Speedway Grand Prix event

- Venue: Polonia Stadium
- Location: Bydgoszcz, (Poland)
- Start date: 8 September 2001
- Competitors: 24

The 2001 Speedway Grand Prix of Poland was the fifth round of the 2001 Speedway Grand Prix season (the world championship). It took place on 8 September 2001 at the Polonia Stadium in Bydgoszcz, Poland.

It was the 8th time that a Speedway Grand Prix of Poland had been held.

The Grand Prix was won by the Australian rider Jason Crump (his 4th career Grand Prix win).

== Grand Prix result ==
| Pos. | Rider | 1 | 2 | 3 | 4 | 5 | 6 | SF1 | SF2 | CF | Final | GP Points |
|---|---|---|---|---|---|---|---|---|---|---|---|---|
| 1 | (Australia) Jason Crump | 3 | 3 | | | | | 3 | | | 3 | 25 |
| 2 | (Sweden) Tony Rickardsson | 2 | 2 | | | | | | 3 | | 2 | 20 |
| 3 | (Sweden) Mikael Karlsson | 3 | 3 | 1 | 2 | 3 | 2 | 2 | | | 1 | 18 |
| 4 | (United States) Billy Hamill | 2 | 3 | | | | | | 2 | | 0 | 16 |
| 5 | (Norway) Rune Holta | 1 | 3 | 2 | | | | | 1 | 3 | | 15 |
| 6 | (Australia) Ryan Sullivan | 1 | 3 | 3 | | | | | 0 | 2 | | 14 |
| 7 | (England) Mark Loram | 3 | 2 | 2 | 2 | 2 | | 1 | | 1 | | 12 |
| 8 | (United States) Greg Hancock | 1 | 3 | 3 | 2 | 2 | | 0 | | 0 | | 10 |
| 9 | (Denmark) Nicki Pedersen | 2 | 1 | 3 | 2 | 0 | 1 | | | | | 8 |
| 10 | (Poland) Tomasz Gollob | 3 | 0 | 1 | | | | | | | | 8 |
| 11 | (Australia) Leigh Adams | 3 | 1 | 0 | | | | | | | | 7 |
| 12 | (Poland) Jarosław Hampel | 1 | 2 | 2 | 3 | 1 | 0 | | | | | 7 |
| 13 | (Sweden) Peter Karlsson | 3 | 3 | 0 | 1 | | | | | | | 6 |
| 14 | (England) Carl Stonehewer | 1 | 1 | | | | | | | | | 6 |
| 15 | (Czech Republic) Antonín Kasper Jr. | 1 | 2 | 2 | 0 | 0 | | | | | | 5 |
| 16 | (Poland) Krzysztof Cegielski | 2 | 2 | 0 | 0 | | | | | | | 5 |
| 17 | (Poland) Grzegorz Walasek | 0 | 3 | 1 | | | | | | | | 4 |
| 18 | (Sweden) Niklas Klingberg | 2 | 1 | 1 | | | | | | | | 4 |
| 19 | (Australia) Todd Wiltshire | 3 | 0 | 0 | | | | | | | | 3 |
| 20 | (Slovenia) Matej Ferjan | 2 | 0 | 0 | | | | | | | | 3 |
| 21 | (Sweden) Henka Gustafsson | 0 | 1 | | | | | | | | | 2 |
| 22 | (Poland) Piotr Protasiewicz | 1 | 1 | | | | | | | | | 2 |
| 23 | (England) Andy Smith | 0 | 0 | | | | | | | | | 1 |
| 24 | (Denmark) Brian Andersen | 0 | 0 | | | | | | | | | 1 |

== Heat by heat ==
- 1 Karlsson P, Klingberg, Hampel, Andersen
- 2 Loram, Cegielski, Hancock, Walasek
- 3 Wiltshire, Ferjan, Protzsiewicz, Gustafsson
- 4 Karlsson M, Pedersen, Kasper, Smith
- 5 Walasek, Hampel, Protasiewicz, Smith
- 6 Hancock, Kasper, Gustafsson, Andersen
- 7 Karlsson P, Cegielski, Pedersen, Wiltshire
- 8 Karlsson M, Loram, Klingberg, Ferjan
- 9 Pedersen, Kasper, Walasek, Ferjan
- 10 Hancock, Hampel, Klingberg, Witshire
- 11 Hampel, Hamill, Holta, Karlsson P
- 12 Adams. Rickardsson, Karlsson M, Kasper
- 13 Crump, Hancock, Stonehewer, Cegielski
- 14 Gollob, Pedersen, Sullivan, Loram
- 15 Holta, Loram, Stonehewer, Kasper
- 16 Sullivan, Karlsson M, Karlsson P, Cegielski
- 17 Crump, Rickardsson, Hampel, Pedersen
- 18 Hamill, Hancock, Adams, Gollob
- 19 Karlsson M, Holta, Gollob, Hampel
- 20 Sullivan, Loram, Pedersen, Adams
- Semi-finals
- 21 Crump, Karlsson M, Loram, Hancock
- 22 Rickardsson, Hamill, Holta, Sullivan
- Consolation final
- 23 Holta, Sullivan, Loram, Hancock
- Final
- 24 Crump Rickardsson, Karlsson M, Hamill
