= Mirko Wolter =

German speedway rider

- Born: 6 September 1976 (age 50); Güstrow, Germany
- Nationality: German

Career history

Germany
- 1995: Brokstedt

Great Britain
- 1996-1997: Sheffield
- 2003: Trewlany

Denmark
- 2002–2004: Kronjylland

Individual honours
- 1999, 2002, 2004: German Champion
- 1992, 1993: German Under-21 Champion

Mirko Wolter (born 6 September 1976 in Güstrow, Germany) is a former motorcycle speedway rider from Germany. He earned four international caps for the German national speedway team.

== Career ==
Wolter first rode in the United Kingdom, riding with the Sheffield Tigers in the Premier League in 1996 and 1997. He did however suffer a bad crash to end his 1996 season. After a six-year absence, he was signed by the Trelawny Tigers in 2003.

Wolter appeared as a wildcard in 2001 German Speedway Grand Prix.

Wolter was a three -time German champion, winning the German Individual Speedway Championship in 1999, 2002 and 2004.

== Result ==
=== Speedway Grand Prix ===
2001 SGP
	Grand Prix	Pos.	Pts.	Heats	Draw
1 (1)	(Germany) Berlin	22	2	(1,1)	24

permanent speedway rider
wild card, track reserve or qualified reserve
rider not classified (track reserve who did not start)

=== World Championships ===
- Individual Speedway World Championship (Speedway Grand Prix)
  - 2001 - 35th place (2 pts in one event)
- Team World Championship (Speedway World Team Cup and Speedway World Cup)
  - 2002 - 3rd placed in the Semi Final Two
  - 2002 - started in the Qualifying round only
  - 2003 - 10th place (5 points in the Event 1)
- Individual U-21 World Championship
  - 1994 - (Norway) Elgane - 13th place (2 pts)
  - 1995 - (Finland) Tampere - 13th place (2 pts)

=== European Championships ===
- European Pairs Championship
  - 2004 - (Hungary) Debrecen - 5th place (7 pts)

== See also ==
- Germany national speedway team
