= Stefan Andersson (speedway rider) =

Swedish motorcycle speedway rider

- Born: 13 September 1971 (age 55)
- Nationality: Swedish

Career history

Sweden
- 1987–1993: Dackarna
- 1994–1996: Indianerna
- 1997, 2000–2003: Team Svelux/Luxo Stars
- 1998–1999: Västervik

Great Britain
- 1994-1998, 2001-2002, 2007: Eastbourne Eagles
- 1999: King's Lynn Stars
- 1999: Peterborough Panthers
- 1999: Oxford Cheetahs

Poland
- 1998: Piła
- 1999-2000: Toruń
- 2001: Rzeszów
- 2002: Gdańsk
- 2003-2006: Gniezno

Denmark
- 2000: Herning

Individual honours
- 1995: Nordic Champion

Team honours
- 1991: Allsvenskan Winner
- 1995: Premier League winner

Stefan Frederik Andersson (born 13 September 1971) is a former motorcycle speedway rider from Sweden. He earned 6 caps for the Sweden national speedway team.

== Career ==
Andersson started his British leagues career after signing for Eastbourne Eagles, shortly after Jon Cook took sole charge of the club.

Andersson rode in Speedway Grand Prix twice and was the 1995 Nordic Champion. After being surplus to requirements with Eastbourne in 1999, he joined King's Lynn Stars on loan for the season.

== Speedway Grand Prix results ==
2001 Speedway Grand Prix Final Championship standings (Riding No 23)
Race no.	Grand Prix	Pos.	Pts.	Heats	Draw No
6 /6	(Sweden) Swedish SGP	18	4	(1,3,1)	23

2005 Speedway Grand Prix Final Championship standings (Riding No 21)
Race no.	Grand Prix	Pos.	Pts.	Heats	Draw No
3 /9	(Italy) Italian SGP	12	5	(3,1,0,0,1)	3

permanent speedway rider
wild card, track reserve or qualified reserve
rider not classified (track reserve who did not start)

== Career details ==
=== World Championships ===
- Individual World Championship (Speedway Grand Prix)
  - 2001 - 32nd place (4 points in one event)
  - 2005 - 21st place (5 points in one event)
- Team World Championship (Speedway World Cup)
  - 2002 - Bronze medal (5 points)

== See also ==
- Sweden national speedway team
- List of Speedway Grand Prix riders
- Speedway in Sweden
