= 2001 Speedway Grand Prix of Sweden =

Speedway Grand Prix event

- Venue: Stockholm Olympic Stadium
- Location: Stockholm, (Sweden)
- Start date: 29 September 2001
- Competitors: 24

The 2001 Speedway Grand Prix of Sweden was the fifth round of the 2002 Speedway Grand Prix season (the world championship). It took place on 29 September 2001 at the Stockholm Olympic Stadium in Stockholm, Sweden.

It was the 7th time that the Speedway Grand Prix of Sweden had been held.

The Grand Prix was won by the Australian rider Jason Crump (his 5th career Grand Prix win).

== Grand Prix result ==
Pos.	Rider	1	2	3	4	5	6	SF1	SF2	CF	Final	GP Points
1	(Australia) Jason Crump	3	3					3			3	25
2	(Sweden) Mikael Karlsson	3	2						3		2	20
3	(Australia) Ryan Sullivan	1	2	3					2		1	18
4	(England) Mark Loram	1	3	2				2			0	16
5	(Sweden) Tony Rickardsson	3	2					1		3		15
6	(Australia) Leigh Adams	3	2	2	3				1	2		14
7	(England) Carl Stonehewer	2	3	1	3	2			0	1		12
8	(United States) Greg Hancock	0	2	3				0		0		10
9	(United States) Billy Hamill	3	1	1								8
10	(Sweden) Peter Karlsson	3	1	2	2	0	1					8
11	(Sweden) Andreas Jonsson	3	1	2	2	0	0					7
12	(Sweden) Niklas Klingberg	2	2	2	1	0						7
13	(Poland) Tomasz Gollob	2	0	3	0	1						6
14	(Denmark) Nicki Pedersen	3	3	0	1							6
15	(Australia) Todd Wiltshire	2	0	3	0	0						5
16	(Norway) Rune Holta	0	0									5
17	(England) Andy Smith	1	2	1								4
18	(Sweden) Stefan Andersson	1	3	1								4
19	(Sweden) Henka Gustafsson	1	2	0								3
20	(Czech Republic) Antonín Kasper Jr.	1	3	0								3
21	(Denmark) Brian Andersen	0	1									2
22	(Poland) Piotr Protasiewicz	0	1									2
23	(England) Chris Louis	0	0									1
24	(Slovenia) Matej Ferjan	0	0									1

== Heat by heat ==
- 1 Jonsson, Gollob, Kasper, Ferjan
- 2 Pedersen, Wiltshire, Andersson, Protasiewicz
- 3 Adams, Klingberg, Gustafsson, Andersen
- 4 Karlsson P, Stonehewer, Smith Louis
- 5 Kasper, Gustafsson, Protasiewicz, Louis
- 6 Andersson, Smith, Andersen, Ferjan
- 7 Stonehewer, Adams, Jonsson, Wiltshire
- 8 Pedersen, Klingberg, Karlsson P, Gollob
- 9 Gollob, Jonsson, Smith, Kasper
- 10 Wiltshire, Karlsson P, Smith, Kasper
- 11 Crump, Karlsson P, Stonehewer, Hancock
- 12 Rickardsson, Jonsson, Loram, Pedersen
- 13 Karlsson M, Adams, Sullivan, Wiltshire
- 14 Hamill, Klingberg, Gollob, Holta
- 15 Stonehewer, Sullivan, Pedersen, Holta
- 16 Loram, Hancock, Gollob, Wiltshire
- 17 Crump, Karlsson M, Klingberg, Jonsson
- 18 Adams, Rickardsson, Hamill, Karlsson P
- 19 Hancock, Stonehewer Karlsson P, Klingberg
- 20 Sullivan, Loram, Hamill, Jonsson
- Semi-finals
- 21 Crump, Loram, Rickardsson, Hancock
- 22 Karlsson M< Sullivan, Adams, Stonehewer
- Consolation final
- 23 Rickardsson, Adams, Stonehewer, Hancock
- Final
- 24 Crump Karlsson M, Sullivan, Loram
