= 2001 Speedway Grand Prix of Denmark =

Speedway Grand Prix event

- Venue: Vojens Speedway Center
- Location: Vojens, (Denmark)
- Start date: 28 July 2001
- Competitors: 24

The 2001 Speedway Grand Prix of Denmark was the third round of the 2001 Speedway Grand Prix season (the world championship). It took place on 25 July 2001 at the Vojens Speedway Center in Vojens, Denmark.

It was the 7th time that the Speedway Grand Prix of Denmark had been held.

The Grand Prix was won by the Swedish rider Tony Rickardsson (his 8th career Grand Prix win).

== Starting positions draw ==
The Speedway Grand Prix Commission nominated Hans Clausen and Jesper B.Jensen as Wild Card. Injured Chris Louis and Joe Screen were replaced by Henrik Gustafsson and Grzegorz Walasek.

1.	SWE (3) Tony Rickardsson
2.	AUS (13) Jason Crump
3.	POL (7) Tomasz Gollob
4.	SWE (21) Niklas Klingberg
5.	AUS (9) Ryan Sullivan
6.	AUS (8) Todd Wiltshire
7.	SWE (17) Jimmy Nilsen
8.	GBR (1) Mark Loram
9.	SWE (11) Peter Karlsson
10.	AUS (6) Leigh Adams
11.	DEN (13) Nicki Pedersen
12.	SLO (22) Matej Ferjan
13.	USA (5) Greg Hancock
14.	POL (16) Piotr Protasiewicz
15.	GBR (12) Carl Stonehewer
16.	DEN (19) Brian Andersen
17.	USA (2) Billy Hamill
18.	NOR (14) Rune Holta
19.	SWE (15) Mikael Karlsson
20.	GBR (10) Chris Louis → POL (26) Grzegorz Walasek
21.	GBR (20) Andy Smith
22.	GBR (18) Joe Screen → SWE (25) Henrik Gustafsson
23.	DEN (23) Hans Clausen
24.	DEN (24) Jesper B. Jensen

== Grand Prix result ==
Pos.	Rider	1	2	3	4	5	6	SF1	SF2	CF	Final	GP Points
1	(Sweden) Tony Rickardsson	3	3					3			3	25
2	(Australia) Jason Crump	3	3						2		2	20
3	(Australia) Leigh Adams	2	2	3	2				3		1	18
4	(Poland) Tomasz Gollob	2	2					2			0	16
5	(Sweden) Niklas Klingberg	1	3	3					0	3		15
6	(Australia) Todd Wiltshire	1	3	2					1	2		14
7	(Sweden) Mikael Karlsson	2	2	2	1	3		0		1		12
8	(Norway) Rune Holta	0	2	2	1	2	2	1		0		10
9	(Australia) Ryan Sullivan	3	1	1								8
10	(Sweden) Peter Karlsson	0	3	3	0	2	1					8
11	(Denmark) Nicki Pedersen	3	3	2	0	0						7
12	(Sweden) Jimmy Nilsen	2	0	0								7
13	(Poland) Grzegorz Walasek	3	3	0	1							6
14	(Denmark) Hans Clausen	1	2	3	1	1						6
15	(United States) Greg Hancock	2	1	2	0	0						5
16	(England) Mark Loram	0	0									5
17	(United States) Billy Hamill	1	3	1								4
18	(England) Carl Stonehewer	3	1	1								4
19	(Denmark) Brian Andersen	3	0	0								3
20	(Denmark) Jesper B. Jensen	2	0	0								3
21	(Sweden) Henka Gustafsson	1	1									2
22	(England) Andy Smith	1	1									2
23	(Poland) Piotr Protasiewicz	0	0									1
24	(Slovenia) Matej Ferjan	0	0									1

== Heat by heat ==
- Heat 01 Andersen, Jensen, Hamill, P Karlsson (ef)
- Heat 02 Stonehewer, Adams, Clausen, Holta (ex)
- Heat 03 Pedersen, M Karlsson, Gustafsson, Protasiewicz (t)
- Heat 04 Walasek, Hancock, Smith, Ferjan
- Heat 05 Hamill, Holta, Gustafsson, Ferjan
- Heat 06 P Karlsson, Clausen, Smith, Protasiewicz
- Heat 07 Pedersen, Adams, Hancock, Andersen
- Heat 08 Walasek, M Karlsson, Stonehewer, Jensen
- Heat 09 Clausen, Hancock, Hamill, Jensen
- Heat 10 P Karlsson, Holta, Stonehewer, Andersen
- Heat 11 Rickardsson, Pedersen, Holta, Loram (ex2)
- Heat 12 Crump, Nilsen, Walasek [Ex], Hancock (ex)
- Heat 13 Adams, Gollob, Wiltshire, P Karlsson
- Heat 14 Sullivan, M Karlsson, Klingberg, Clausen
- Heat 15 Wiltshire, Holta, Clausen, Hancock (ex)
- Heat 16 Klingberg, P Karlsson, Walasek, Loram
- Heat 17 Rickardsson, Adams, M Karlsson, Nilsen
- Heat 18 Crump, Gollob, Sullivan, Pedersen
- Heat 19 M Karlsson, Wiltshire, P Karlsson, Pedersen
- Heat 20 Klingberg, Holta, Sullivan, Nilsen
- semi-finals
- Heat 21 Rickardsson, Gollob, Holta, M Karlsson
- Heat 22 Adams, Crump, Wiltshire, Klingberg (ex)
- Consolation final
- Heat 23 Klingberg, Wiltshire, M Karlsson, Holta
- Final
- Heat 24 Rickardsson, Crump, Adams, Gollob
