= Tomasz Chrzanowski =

Polish speedway rider

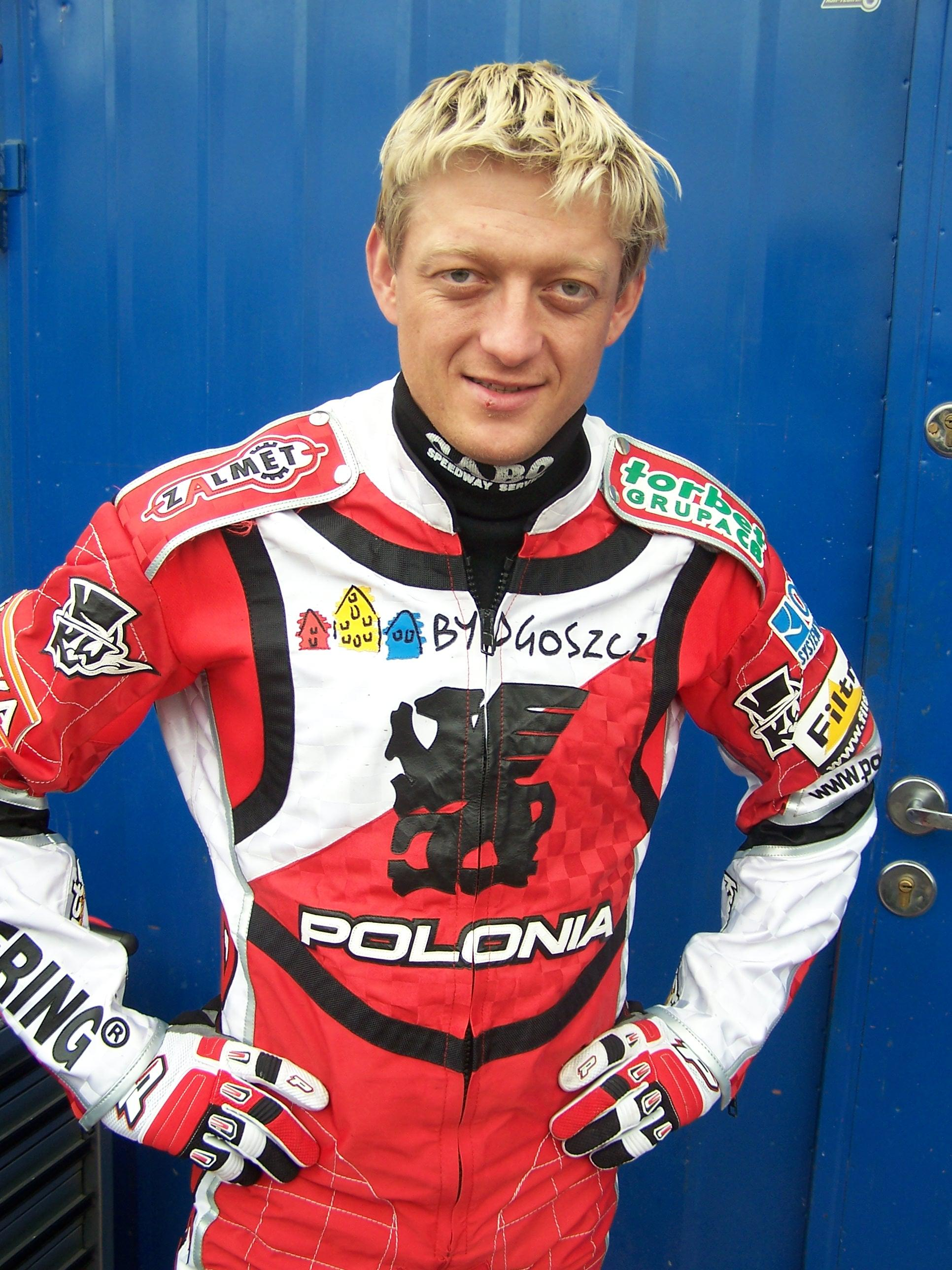
- Born: 4 February 1980 (age 46); Lulkowo, Toruń County, Poland
- Nationality: Polish

Career history

Poland
- 1997-2002: Toruń
- 2003-2005, 2007-2008, 2012: Gdańsk
- 2006: Rzeszów
- 2009: Bydgoszcz
- 2010-2011, 2013: Grudziądz
- 2014: Łódź
- 2015-2016: Krosno

Sweden
- 2007: Västervik

Great Britain
- 2002: Poole
- 2006-2007, 2011: Swindon

Denmark
- 2001: Brovst
- 2010: Fjelsted
- 2011: Outrup

Team honours
- 2001: Polish Pairs Champion

Tomasz Chrzanowski (born 4 February 1980 in Lulkowo, Toruń County, Poland) is a former motorcycle speedway rider from Poland.

== Career ==
Chrzanowski has represented the Poland national speedway team.

In the British leagues, Chrzanowski rode for Poole Pirates in 2002 and Swindon Robins from 2006 to 2007 and again in 2011.

== Speedway Grand Prix results ==
2004 Speedway Grand Prix Final Championship standings (Riding No 23)
Race no.	Grand Prix	Pos.	Pts.	Heats	Draw No
8 /9	(Poland) Polish SGP	22nd	2	(0,1)	23

2005 Speedway Grand Prix Final Championship standings (Riding No 15)
Race no.	Grand Prix	Pos.	Pts.	Heats	Draw No
1 /9	(Europe) European SGP	14th	4	(1,2,0,0,1)	10
2 /9	(Sweden) Swedish SGP	13th	4	(3,0,0,1,0)	10
3 /9	(Slovenia) Slovenian SGP	16th	2	(0,0,1,0,1)	9
4 /9	(United Kingdom) British SGP	9th	7	(0,2,0,2,3)	4
5 /9	(Denmark) SGP	16th	2	(1,1,0,0,0)	12
6 /9	(Czech Republic) Czech Rep. SGP	16th	1	(0,1,0,0,0)	16
7 /9	(Sweden) Scandinavian SGP	16th	1	(0,0,0,1,0)	4
8 /9	(Poland) Polish SGP	15th	1	(0,1,0,0,0)	15
9 /9	(Italy) Italian SGP	9th	6	(3,2,1,0,0)	8

permanent speedway rider
wild card, track reserve or qualified reserve
rider not classified (track reserve who did not start)

== Results ==
=== World Championships ===
- Individual World Championship (Speedway Grand Prix)
  - 2004 - 39th place (2 point as wild card)
  - 2005 - 15th place (28 point)
- Individual U-21 World Championship
  - 1998 - 9th place (7 points)
  - 1999 - 13th place (5 points)
  - 2001 - 15th place (4 points)

=== European Championships ===
- European Under-19 Championship
  - 1998 - 12th place (4 points)
  - 1999 - 4th place (12+2 points)
- European Speedway Club Champions' Cup
  - 2002 - Bronze medal (4 points)

=== Domestic competitions ===
- Individual Polish Championship
  - 2003 - finalist
  - 2004 - finalist
- Individual U-21 Polish Championship
  - 1999 - Bronze medal
  - 2000 - Silver medal
- Polish Pairs Championship
  - 2004 - Bronze medal
- Polish Under-21 Pairs Championship
  - 2000 - Bronze medal
- Team Polish Championship (Speedway Ekstraliga)
  - 2001 - Polish Champion with Apator Toruń
- Team U-21 Polish Championship
  - 1999 - Bronze medal

== See also ==
- Polish national speedway team
- List of Speedway Grand Prix riders
