= Tony Rickardsson =

Swedish motorcycle speedway rider

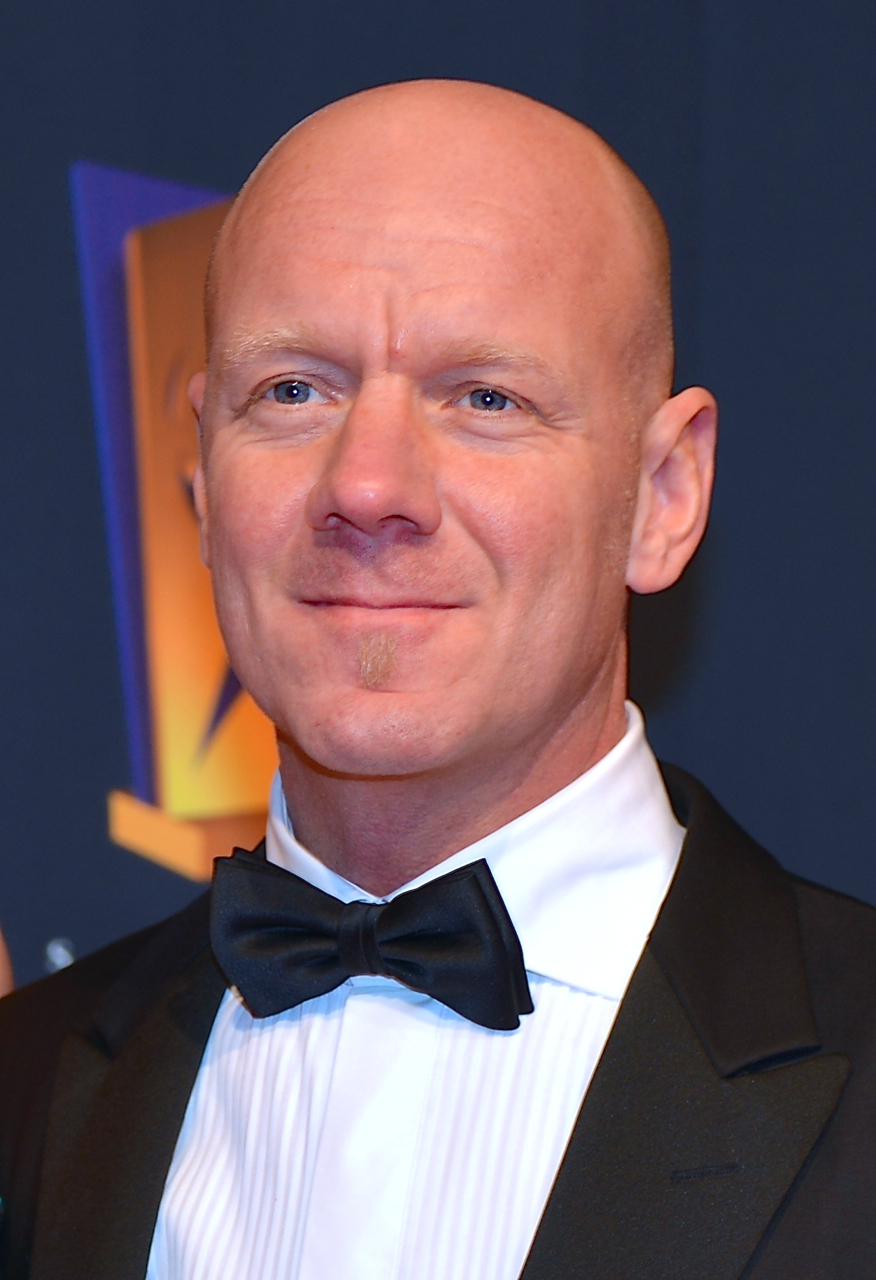
- At the Swedish Sports Gala in 2014
- Born: 17 August 1970 (age 56); Avesta, Sweden
- Nationality: Swedish

Career history

Sweden
- 1987: Gamarna
- 1988–1990: Stockholm United
- 1991: Getingarna
- 1992–1993: Rospiggarna
- 1994–1998: Valsarna
- 1999–2005: Masarna

Great Britain
- 1991–1994, 1997–1998: Ipswich Witches
- 1999: King's Lynn Stars
- 2001–2004: Poole Pirates
- 2005: Arena Essex Hammers
- 2006: Oxford Cheetahs

Poland
- 1991: Polonia Bydgoszcz
- 1992: Ostrów Wielkopolski
- 1993: Zielona Góra
- 1994–1996, 2004–2006: Unia Tarnów
- 1997–1998: Stal Gorzów Wielkopolski
- 1999–2000: Wybrzeże Gdańsk
- 2001–2003: KS Toruń

Speedway Grand Prix statistics
- Starts: 84
- Finalist: 52 times
- Winner: 20 times

Individual honours
- 1990, 1994, 1997, 1998, 1999, 2001, 2004: Swedish Champion

Team honours
- 1989, 1998, 2000: Elitserien Champion
- 1987: Allsvenskan Div 1 Champion

Tony Rickardsson
Medal record
Representing Sweden
Speedway World Championship
Gold medal – first place	1994
Gold medal – first place	1998
Gold medal – first place	1999
Gold medal – first place	2001
Gold medal – first place	2002
Gold medal – first place	2005
Silver medal – second place	1991
Silver medal – second place	1995
Silver medal – second place	2004
Bronze medal – third place	2000
Bronze medal – third place	2003
Speedway World Team Cup
Gold medal – first place	1994
Gold medal – first place	2000
Gold medal – first place	2004
Silver medal – second place	1991
Silver medal – second place	1992
Silver medal – second place	1998
Silver medal – second place	2005
Bronze medal – third place	1993
Bronze medal – third place	1997
Bronze medal – third place	2001
Bronze medal – third place	2002
Speedway World Pairs Championship
Gold medal – first place	1993
Silver medal – second place	1992
Golden Helmet
Gold medal – first place	1992
Gold medal – first place	1993
Gold medal – first place	1995
Silver medal – second place	1997
Silver medal – second place	1998
Silver medal – second place	1999
Bronze medal – third place	1994

Jan Tony Sören Rickardsson (born on 17 August 1970) is a Swedish former professional motorcycle speedway rider. He competed in the Speedway World Championships from 1989 to 2006 and won six Speedway World Championship titles in 15 attempts. He earned 43 caps for the Sweden national speedway team. In 2011, Rickardsson was named an FIM Legend for his motorcycling achievements.

== Career summary ==
=== Promising talent ===
Rickardsson was born in Avesta, Dalarna County, Sweden. In 1989, he became Swedish team champion with the now defunct Stockholm U team. The next year, he won the Swedish Championship, a title he's won six times since, including three times in a row from 1997 to 1999. That year, he also won a bronze medal at the Junior World Championships in Lviv. In 1991, he made his debut at the World Championship in Gothenburg, and surprised many by winning silver behind diminutive Dane Jan O. Pedersen. Rickardsson was lucky to actually make the 1991 World Final after having missed qualifying when he finished tenth in the Nordic Final in Denmark, but got his chance when as first reserve he replaced injured English rider Andy Smith for the World Semi-final in Germany and ended up finishing a strong fifth to qualify for the Final.

This promising performance was followed up by two fourteenth-places at the next World Championship, before he won the last single-event World Championships in an extra play-off race against Danish triple World Champion Hans Nielsen and Australian Craig Boyce. In 1993 he won the Speedway World Pairs Championship with Per Jonsson and Henrik Gustafsson. He also won the 1992 and 1994 World Team Cup Championships as a member of the powerful Swedish teams which included 1990 World Champion Per Jonsson, Henrik Gustafsson, 1988 World Under-21 champ Peter Nahlin, Jimmy Nilsen and Mikael Karlsson.

=== World dominance ===
Rickardsson won the Elite League Riders' Championship, held at the Abbey Stadium on 11 October 1998.

Despite being on or near the top of the tables in the new Speedway Grand Prix series, organised as six events where points were tallied at the end, Rickardsson failed to win a single individual Grand Prix event in the next three years, and only won a World Championship silver and a Swedish Championship in that time. However, from 1998 onwards, he was dominant. He won three of six events in 1998, including a home win in Linköping, and ended up beating fellow Swede Jimmy Nilsen by 12 points. Joining Hans Nielsen as the only two riders to have won world titles in both the single meeting and grand prix formats. This year, he also won the Elitserien with Valsarna of Hagfors, being the highest averaging rider that season, and he won the British Elite League with Ipswich, averaging the highest for them as well. 1999 was an almost equally stunning season, although it started badly when he got disqualified in the first race at Prague, finishing eleventh. After three races, he was third, 24 points behind Tomasz Gollob, who looked to be cruising to victory. However, Gollob ran into trouble in the fourth race at Coventry, being forced to retire after the introductory stages and finishing eighth, meaning that Rickardsson caught up 15 points in one race. With one event left at Vojens, Gollob still led by four points, but in a quarter-final heat where Ryan Sullivan had been excluded and he only had to finish in the top two to qualify for the semi-final, Gollob finished third, and the pressure was off Rickardsson - who would now win if he finished in the top six. This recovery gave him Swedish sport's arguably greatest award, Svenska Dagbladet Gold Medal (lit.: The Achievement Medal), for the best achievement of the year.

=== 21st century ===
Rickardsson continued to win titles throughout the new century, although Mark Loram won the 2000 World Championship despite not winning a single event. Rickardsson won one - at Wrocław, but was too inconsistent to win the overall title. However, he again won the Elitserien, this time with his local team Masarna from Avesta, as he and team-mate Leigh Adams were the two highest averaging riders in the entire league. In 2001, he was back on the World stage, winning the World title with a record 121 points from six Grand Prix events, only missing one final - the last, at home on Stockholms Stadion, which was really academic as only a thirteenth place could possibly have robbed him of the title. He managed to win at home in the next Grand Prix series in 2002, which gave him three individual wins as he won his fifth World Championship.

In 2003, Rickardsson finished third overall. Thirteenth place finishes in Gothenburg, Bydgoszcz and Hamar ruining his bid for the title, and a concussion kept him out of the Swedish team that won the World Cup at Vojens (though he was part of a qualifier race and hence stands with a World Cup medal - his only title that year). The following year, he managed to win the Swedish Championship at Målilla, but consistency eluded him as Jason Crump pipped him to the World title by three points (although the lead was 17 points before the final race).

Rickardsson followed this up with another extremely strong season in 2005. With six first positions at Wrocław (first event), Krško (third), Cardiff (fourth), Copenhagen (fifth), Prague (sixth) and Lonigo (ninth); a second in the Swedish event at Eskilstuna (second); third in the Scandinavian held in Målilla (seventh) and a lowly ninth in the Polish Grand Prix held at Bydgoszcz (eighth event). Even with such a poor finish in Poland, however, he had already virtually sown up the Championship in the seventh Grand Prix in Målilla, ahead of Jason Crump. After the sixth event held in the Czech Republic, he was first in the points per event table of the Elitserien (the Swedish Domestic Elite League). Though Tony stated that he would give up racing after the 2006 season, he announced his early retirement from both World Championship and Domestic Speedway on 1 August 2006 at a press conference in Stockholm, in order to pursue his interest in racing cars instead. Rickardsson was a contestant on the TV4 television show Let's Dance 2008 in which he finished second.

== Summary of titles ==
- Speedway World Champion 6 times (1994, 1998, 1999, 2001, 2002, 2005) - Record, jointly held with Ivan Mauger of New Zealand and Bartosz Zmarzlik of Poland.
- World Pairs Champion 1993
- World Team Cup winner 2 times (1994, 2000)
- World Cup winner 2 times (2003, 2004)
- Swedish Champion 7 times (1990, 1994, 1997, 1998, 1999, 2001, 2004)
- Swedish Elite League Champion 3 times (1989 with Stockholm, 1998 with Valsarna, 2000 with Masarna)
- Swedish National League Champion (1987 with Gamarna)
- Polish League Champion 3 times (2001 with Torun, 2004, 2005 with Tarnow)
- Peter Craven Shield (British team competition) Champion 2 times (1998 with Ipswich, 2001 with Poole)
- British Elite League Champion 3 Times (1998 with Ipswich, 2003 & 2004 with Poole)
- Series 500 Champion (Australian Masters Series) 1 time (1995)
- Golden Helmet of Pardubice 3 times (1992, 1993, 1995)

== Other honours ==
- Jerring Award: 2005

In 2024, Rickardsson was honoured by Carl XVI Gustaf for merits in Swedish sport.

== World Final Appearances ==
=== Individual World Championship ===
- 1991 - (Sweden) Gothenburg, Ullevi - 2nd - 12pts
- 1992 - (Poland) Wrocław, Olympic Stadium - 14th - 5pts
- 1993 - (Germany) Pocking, Rottalstadion - 14th - 4pts
- 1994 - (Denmark) Vojens, Speedway Center Winner - 12pts + 3pts

=== World Pairs Championship ===
- 1992 - (Italy) Lonigo Santa Marina Stadium (with Per Jonsson / Henrik Gustafsson) - 2nd - 22pts (0)
- 1993 - (Denmark) Vojens, Speedway Center (with Per Jonsson / Henrik Gustafsson) - Winner - 26pts (15)

=== World Team Cup/World Cup ===
- 1991 - (Denmark) Vojens, Speedway Center (with Per Jonsson / Henrik Gustafsson / Jimmy Nilsen / Peter Nahlin) - 2nd - 30pts (7)
- 1992 - (Sweden) Kumla, Kumla Motorstadion (with Per Jonsson / Henrik Gustafsson / Jimmy Nilsen / Peter Nahlin) - second - 33pts (7)
- 1993 - (England) Coventry, Brandon Stadium (with Per Jonsson / Henrik Gustafsson / Peter Karlsson / Peter Nahlin) - 3rd - 28pts (9)
- 1994 - (Germany) Brokstedt, Holsteinring Brokstedt (with Henrik Gustafsson / Mikael Karlsson) - Winner - 23pts (12)
- 1995 - (Poland) Bydgoszcz, Polonia Bydgoszcz Stadium (with Henrik Gustafsson / Peter Karlsson) - 4th - 19pts (15+2)
- 1997 - (Poland) Piła, Stadion Polonii Piła (with Jimmy Nilsen / Peter Karlsson) - 3rd - 21pts (17)
- 1998 - (Denmark) Vojens, Speedway Center (with Jimmy Nilsen / Peter Karlsson) - 2nd - 24pts (5)
- 2000 - (England) Coventry, Brandon Stadium (with Mikael Karlsson / Henrik Gustafsson / Peter Karlsson / Niklas Klingberg) - Winner - 40pts (16+3)
- 2001 - (Poland) Wrocław, Olympic Stadium (with Jimmy Nilsen / Mikael Karlsson / Niklas Klingberg / Andreas Jonsson) - 3rd - 51pts (17)
- 2002 - Peterborough, East of England Showground (with Niklas Klingberg / Peter Karlsson / Mikael Karlsson / Stefan Andersson) - 3rd - 54pts (15)
- 2004 - (England) Poole, Poole Stadium (with Mikael Karlsson / Antonio Lindbäck / Andreas Jonsson / Peter Karlsson) - Winner - 49pts (12)
- 2005 - (Poland) Wrocław, Olympic Stadium (with Peter Karlsson / Andreas Jonsson / Antonio Lindbäck / Fredrik Lindgren) - 2nd - 34pts (7)

=== Individual Under-21 World Championship ===
- 1990 - (Soviet Union) Lviv, Stadium Ska - 3rd - 10pts

== Major results ==
=== Speedway Grand Prix ===
Year	Position	Points	Best Finish	Notes
1995	2nd	88	2nd	Second in Austrian and Swedish Grand Prix
1996	4th	86	2nd	Second in Polish Grand Prix
1997	4th	90	2nd	Second in Danish Grand Prix
1998	1st	111	Winner	Won Czech Republic, German and Swedish Grand Prix
1999	1st	111	Winner	Won British and Danish Grand Prix
2000	3rd	94	Winner	Won Polish Grand Prix
2001	1st	121	Winner	Won British and Danish Grand Prix
2002	1st	181	Winner	Won Norwegian, Swedish and Danish Grand Prix
2003	3rd	127	Winner	Won European Grand Prix
2004	2nd	155	Winner	Won Slovenian and Norwegian Grand Prix
2005	1st	196	Winner	Won European, Slovenian, British, Danish, Czech Republic and Italian Grand Prix
2006	14th	41	4th	Retired from all speedway following 5 rounds of the series

=== Grand Prix wins ===
- 1: 1998 Speedway Grand Prix of Czech Republic
- 2: 1998 Speedway Grand Prix of Germany
- 3: 1998 Speedway Grand Prix of Sweden
- 4: 1999 Speedway Grand Prix of Great Britain
- 5: 1999 Speedway Grand Prix of Denmark
- 6: 2000 Speedway Grand Prix of Poland
- 7: 2001 Speedway Grand Prix of Great Britain
- 8: 2001 Speedway Grand Prix of Denmark
- 9: 2002 Speedway Grand Prix of Norway
- 10: 2002 Speedway Grand Prix of Sweden
- 11: 2002 Speedway Grand Prix of Denmark
- 12: 2003 Speedway Grand Prix of Europe
- 13: 2004 Speedway Grand Prix of Slovenia
- 14: 2004 Speedway Grand Prix of Norway
- 15: 2005 Speedway Grand Prix of Europe
- 16: 2005 Speedway Grand Prix of Slovenia
- 17: 2005 Speedway Grand Prix of Great Britain
- 18: 2005 Speedway Grand Prix of Denmark
- 19: 2005 Speedway Grand Prix of Czech Republic
- 20: 2005 Speedway Grand Prix of Italy

== Trivia ==
- Rickardsson was nominated for the most prestigious Swedish sports awards for many years before finally winning in 2006 . For the last four years, the Swedish comedian Robert Gustafsson often appeared as him, talking sarcastically about how the winners deserved the prize while he was annoyed about never winning.

Awards
Preceded by Sweden men's national handball team	Svenska Dagbladet Gold Medal; 1999	Succeeded by Lars Frölander
